= Sixth National Government of New Zealand =

Government of New Zealand since 2023

Sixth National Government
- Ministries of New Zealand
- 2023–present
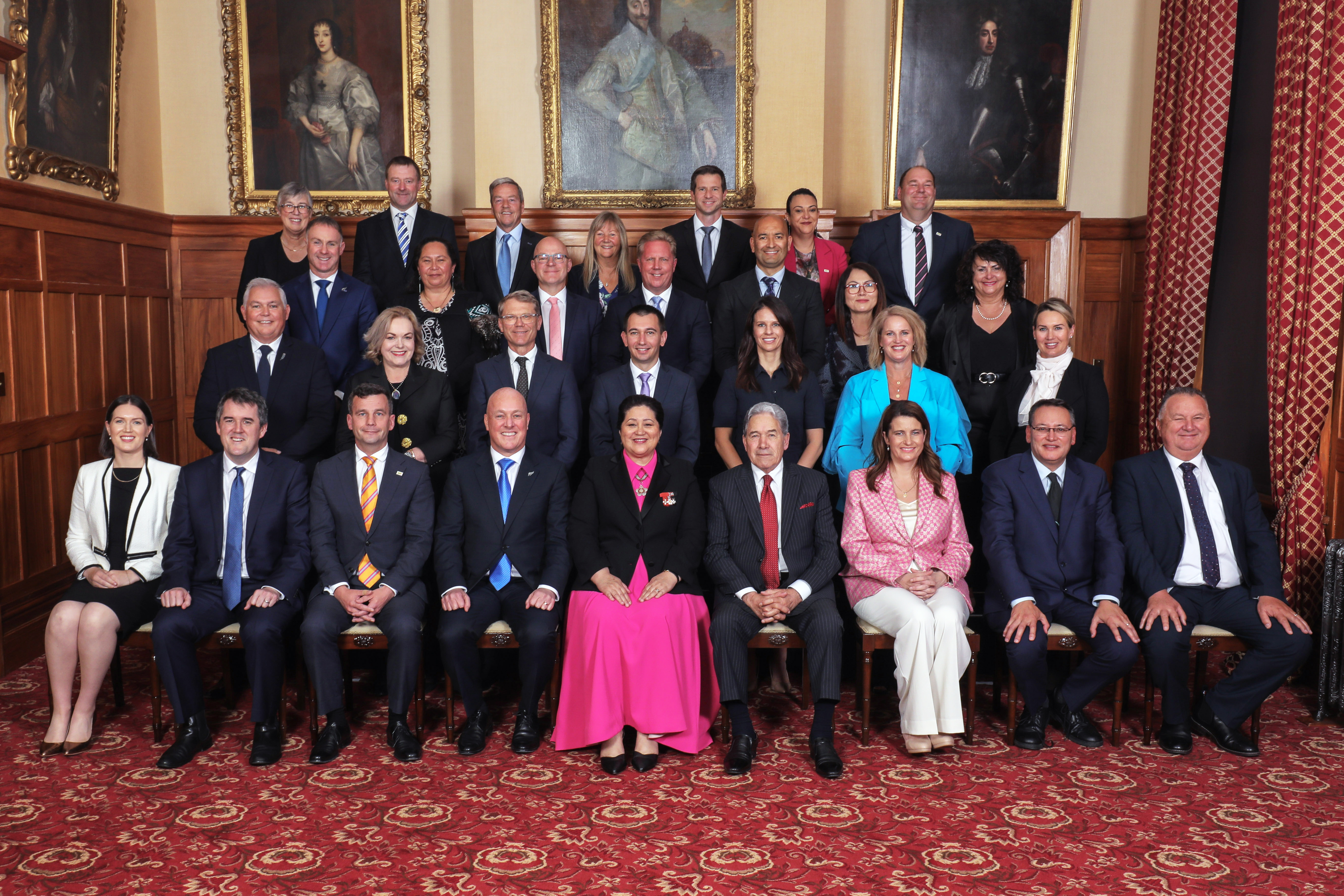
- Ministers pictured with the Governor-General after their swearing-in, 27 November 2023 (Note: Back row from left: Rachel Hayward (Clerk of the Executive Council), Mark Patterson, Andrew Bayly, Penny Simmonds, Chris Penk, Karen Chhour, Andrew Hoggard. Third row: Simon Watts, Nicole McKee, Matt Doocey, Todd McClay, Tama Potaka, Melissa Lee, Casey Costello. Second row: Mark Mitchell, Judith Collins, Paul Goldsmith, Simeon Brown, Erica Stanford, Louise Upston, Nicola Grigg. Front row: Brooke van Velden, Chris Bishop, David Seymour, Christopher Luxon, Cindy Kiro (Governor-General), Winston Peters, Nicola Willis, Shane Reti, Shane Jones.)
- Date formed: 27 November 2023

People and organisations
- Monarch: Charles III
- Governor-General: Cindy Kiro
- Prime Minister: Christopher Luxon
- Deputy Prime Minister: Winston Peters (until 31 May 2025); David Seymour (from 31 May 2025)
- Member parties: New Zealand National Party; ACT New Zealand; New Zealand First
- Status in legislature: Majority (coalition)
- Opposition parties: New Zealand Labour Party; Green Party of Aotearoa New Zealand; Te Pāti Māori
- Opposition leader: Chris Hipkins

History
- Election: 2023
- Legislature term: 54th Parliament
- Budgets: 2024 budget; 2025 budget; 2026 budget
- Predecessor: Sixth Labour Government

The Sixth National Government is a coalition government comprising the National Party, ACT New Zealand and New Zealand First that has governed New Zealand since November 2023.

Since the 7 November 2026 general election, it has acted as a caretaker government until a new government reflecting the election result is agreed and sworn in.

The government is headed by Christopher Luxon, the National Party leader and prime minister, along with coalition party leaders David Seymour and Winston Peters.

Following the 2023 general election on 14 October 2023, coalition negotiations between the three parties ended on 24 November, and ministers of the new government were sworn in by the Governor-General on 27 November.

The coalition government agreed to a select committee with the possibility of amending the Treaty of Waitangi legislation; to require councils with Māori wards to hold local referendums on their status or abolish them, and to prioritise English over the Māori language in Government departments. National and New Zealand First did not support the Treaty Principles Bill beyond its first reading. On broader issues, the government's plan included restoring interest deductibility for rental properties, changes in housing policies, infrastructure investment, conservative law and justice reforms, and tax cuts. Social policies included the removal of access to puberty blockers for transgender children, changes to the sex education curriculum, and the repeal of the Smokefree Legislation.

== Background ==
=== 2023 general election ===
In the 2023 general election held on 14 October, the National Party defeated the incumbent Labour Party, winning 48 seats and 38.1% of the popular vote. Labour won 27% of the popular with its share of parliamentary seats dropping from 64 to 34. Prime Minister and Labour leader Chris Hipkins conceded the election and congratulated National Party leader Christopher Luxon.

=== Coalition negotiations ===
Following the 2023 general election, National entered into coalition negotiations with both the libertarian ACT New Zealand and populist New Zealand First parties. Luxon said that he would be conducting the negotiations privately "and would not confirm [...] his stance on policies such as ACT's referendum on co-governance". University of Otago law professor Andrew Geddis speculated that National's coalition talks with ACT would be influenced by NZ First leader Winston Peters' demands and history of playing a "kingmaker" role in previous elections. Peters had publicly criticised several National and ACT policies during the 2023 election campaign including National's proposal to ease the ban on foreign home purchases, tax cuts, agricultural emissions pricing, proposal to raise the retirement age from 65 to 67, and ACT's proposal to slash government expenditure and public service jobs.

Coalition talks between the three parties was influenced by close results in several marginal seats including Te Atatū, Banks Peninsula, Nelson, Tāmaki Makaurau, and Te Tai Tokerau. Nicola Willis was expected to be Finance Minister. Following the release of final results on 3 November, National's parliamentary representation dropped from 50 to 48 seats. As National and ACT did not reach the 62-seat threshold for forming a government, a prospective National-led government needed to include New Zealand First.

On 8 November, ACT and NZ First made first contact in their coalition talks with National during a meeting between ACT's chief of staff Andrew Ketels and NZ First's chief of staff Darroch Ball. This introductory meeting was meant "to establish a line of communication" between the two parties. Luxon and Peters, along with senior colleagues and chiefs of staff from National and NZ First, held talks in Wellington that same week. Peters' negotiation team included Ball and fellow NZ First MP Shane Jones while National's negotiation team included Chris Bishop. Following the release of final results, Seymour had attempted to contact Peters via text message but the NZ First leader had dismissed it as a scam. On 9 November, Seymour expressed a hope that coalition negotiations and government formation would be completed before an upcoming APEC meeting in mid-November 2023. That same day, Peters criticised the law change by the previous Labour Government that had allowed voters to register on election day, thus delaying the Electoral Commission's publication of final results by one week. Peters had supported the law change in 2020.

The ACT party had proposed a referendum on the principles of the Treaty of Waitangi, something that gained media attention during the election campaign. The referendum was a negotiation issue for the incoming government. The referendum idea drew criticism from Green Party co-leader James Shaw, Labour MP Willie Jackson, and former Prime Minister and National MP Jim Bolger, who expressed concerns that it would antagonise Māori people and provoke violence.

NZ First and ACT both expressed disagreement with National's proposed 15% tax on foreign house buyers, a key component of its tax policy which was estimated to raise NZ$740 million a year.

On 13 November, Luxon said he was unlikely to go to the 2023 APEC summit in the United States due to prioritising a government coalition. Instead, the outgoing Trade Minister Damien O'Connor represented New Zealand at the summit.

On 15 November, Luxon, Seymour and Peters met at Pullman Hotel's boardroom in Auckland. It was the first time the three of them had met together in person since the election.

On 20 November, Luxon said that National had reached an agreement on policy positions with ACT and New Zealand First, but Peters said that it was an "assumption" to say that a policy agreement had been reached, and Seymour said "that Luxon had maybe had too many Weet-Bix that day". Seymour also opined that ACT as the second largest party in the coalition should hold the position of Deputy Prime Minister and have more ministerial portfolios than NZ First. That same day, the three parties entered into talks about allocating cabinet ministerial positions. On 21 November, Luxon met with Seymour to discuss ministerial portfolios.

=== Coalition agreements ===
Luxon, Seymour and Peters met in Wellington on the afternoon of 23 November to conclude the negotiations between National, ACT and NZ First. That night, Luxon informed Governor-General Cindy Kiro that he had the numbers to form a government. On the morning of 24 November, the three party leaders signed coalition agreements. Seymour welcomed the coalition deal and said that the government would announce a 100-day plan that could include repealing some legislation passed by the preceding Labour Government.

The terms of National's two coalition agreements with NZ First and ACT were publicly revealed on 24 November 2023. As part of National's agreement with NZ First, National would not proceed with its proposed foreign buyer tax, but would instead fund tax cuts via reprioritisation and other forms of revenue gathering. The new government would adopt ACT's policies of restoring interest deductibility for rental properties and pet bonds. In addition to adopting National's youth crime and gang policies, the government would adopt ACT's policies of rewriting firearms legislation and NZ First's policy of training 500 new police officers. It would scrap the previous Labour Government's Fair Pay Agreements Act 2022, proposed hate speech legislation, co-governance policies, Auckland light rail, Three Waters reform programme, and Māori Health Authority. The government would establish a new regulatory agency answerable to Minister for Regulation Seymour that would review the quality of new and existing legislation. It would adopt NZ First's policy of establishing $1.2 billion Regional Infrastructure Fund. Fees-free tertiary education would be shifted from the first to last year of tertiary study.

While the government would not support Act's proposed referendum on the principles of the Treaty of Waitangi, it would introduce a Treaty Principles Bill and amend existing Treaty of Waitangi legislation to focus on the "original intent of the legislation." The government adopted NZ First's policy of legislating the English language as an official language of New Zealand and requiring all government departments to use English in their communications and keep their primary name in English, except for those dealing with Māori people. It adopted NZ First's policy of halting all work related to the He Puapua report and confirming that the United Nations Declaration on the Rights of Indigenous Peoples has no legal basis in New Zealand law. The government would restore the right to local referendums on the establishment or ongoing use of Māori wards. It would also adopt most of National's fiscal, taxation, 100-day and 100-point economic plans, with exceptions specified in the agreements with ACT and NZ First.

As part of National's agreement with New Zealand First, the government agreed to end all remaining COVID-19 vaccine mandates and to hold an independent inquiry into how the COVID-19 pandemic was handled in New Zealand. This independent inquiry would be conducted publicly by local and international experts and was expected to examine the use of multiple lockdowns, vaccine procurement and efficacy, social and economic impacts on both national and regional levels, and whether decisions and actions taken by the government were justified. While the outgoing Labour Government had commissioned a Royal Commission of Inquiry into COVID-19 Lessons Learned, Peters claimed during election campaigning that the inquiry's terms of reference were "too limited". Luxon also stated that the government supported broadening the inquiry's terms of reference.

== History ==
=== 2023 ===
The new government was formally sworn into office on 27 November 2023. On 29 November, the Government announced its 100-day plan which would focus on implementing 49 economic, law and order, and public service policies. Notable economic policies have included introducing legislation to limit the Reserve Bank of New Zealand's mandate to combating inflation, cancelling various fuel taxes including the Auckland Regional Fuel Tax, repealing the Clean Car discount programme, reintroducing 90-day trials periods for all businesses, halting the Lake Onslow hydro scheme, and repealing the previous Labour Government's Water Services Entities Act 2022, Spatial Planning Act 2023 and Natural and Built Environment Act 2023. Notable law and order policies have included banning gang patches, preventing gang members from gathering in public and communicating with each other, ending taxpayer funding for Section 27 cultural reports, and extending rehabilitation programmes to remand prisoners. Notable public service policies have included beginning work on establishing a third medical school at the University of Waikato, banning cellphones in schools, testing new World Health Organization (WHO) regulations against a "national interest" test, and disestablishing Te Pukenga and the Māori Health Authority. The government has been described by various observers as a very conservative government for New Zealand standards.

On 7 December, Foreign Minister Winston Peters successfully moved a motion calling for a ceasefire in the Gaza war. The motion also condemned Hamas' terror attack on 7 October 2023, called for the release of all hostages, recognised Israel's right to defend itself in accordance with international law, and called for civilians to be protected from armed conflict. The government's motion also incorporated an amendment by Labour MP Phil Twyford calling for the establishment of a State of Palestine in accordance with a two-state solution. Peter's motion was criticised as being insufficient by Labour MP Damien O'Connor and Green Party MP Golriz Ghahraman.

On 8 December, Minister of Transport Simeon Brown ordered Waka Kotahi (the New Zealand Transport Agency) to give primacy to its English name over its Māori name. That same day, Tertiary Education Minister Penny Simmonds confirmed that the mega polytechnic Te Pūkenga (New Zealand Institute of Skills and Technology) would be dissolved and replaced by eight to ten institutions. Also on the same day, Luxon announced during an official visit to Hawke's Bay that the Government would pause work on restoring the Napier-Wairoa railway line and focus on repairing State Highway 2.

On 11 December, Education Minister Erica Stanford announced that the Government would be delaying the previous Labour Government's plans to make online mathematics and literacy tests a prerequisite for National Certificate of Educational Achievement (NCEA) qualifications in 2026. Trial runs of the tests had recorded failure rates of more than 40% particularly among Māori, Pasifika students, and schools in poorer communities. Stanford said that the students had been let down by the education curriculum and that it would be unfair to make the tests the only way to achieve NCEA qualifications.

On 13 December, the Government passed its first new law reversing the previous Labour Government's law change in 2018 giving the Reserve Bank of New Zealand the dual mandate of managing inflation and supporting maximum sustainable employment. The Government's law change ordered the Reserve Bank to focus solely on managing inflation. The Bill was introduced by Finance Minister Nicola Willis. Labour's finance spokesperson Grant Robertson criticised the National coalition government for reversing his party's financial reforms. That same day, Willis declined KiwiRail's request for an additional NZ$1.47 billion to replace its ageing Interislander ferry fleet. The Government also cancelled the previous Labour Government's plans to buy new replacement ferries, with Willis stating that the Government would be looking at cheaper alternatives.

On 14 December, the Government passed legislation repealing the previous Labour Government's Fair Pay Agreements Act 2022 under urgency. While National, ACT and NZ First supported the bill, it was opposed by the Labour, Green, and Māori parties. Several unions including Stand Up, the New Zealand Nurses Organisation, Post Primary Teachers' Association and Unite Union had also opposed the National-led government's plans to repeal fair pay agreements, staging protests outside the electorate office of ACT leader Seymour on 12 December. By contrast, Retail NZ chief executive Carolyn Young welcomed the repeal of Fair Pay Agreements, claiming they were unnecessary and complicated employment laws.

On 14 December, the Government passed the Land Transport (Clean Vehicle Discount Scheme Repeal) Amendment Act 2023 under urgency. This bill repealed the previous Labour Government's Clean Car Discount, which encouraged consumers to buy electrical and hybrid vehicles by imposing a tax on high-emissions vehicles such as utes. While the governing National, ACT and NZ First parties supported the Bill, it was opposed by the opposition Labour, Green and Māori parties.

On 16 December Transport Minister Brown instructed the New Zealand Transport Agency to halt the Transport Choices Programme, which involved funding various local council projects to promote cycling, walking and public transportation. The Government's transport policy changes were criticised by Cycling Action Network spokesperson Patrick Morgan and Mayor of New Plymouth Neil Holdom but were supported welcomed by New Plymouth councillor Murray Cheong. Notable projects affected by the Government's transportation policy change included the "Let's Get Wellington Moving" programme. Following negotiations with the Wellington City Council (WCC) and the Greater Wellington Regional Council, the three parties reached an agreement in which the Government would fund the Basin Reserve upgrade while the WCC would take over the Golden Mile project.

On 20 December, the Government passed legislation repealing the Natural and Built Environment Act and the Spatial Planning Act as part of its plans to reform the Resource Management Act framework. That same day, Finance Minister Willis released the Government's mini-budget, which delivered NZ$7.47 billion in operational savings.

On 21 December, the Government passed legislation reinstating 90-day trials for all employers, a key campaign promise by National and Act. While the bill was supported by National, ACT, and NZ First, it was opposed by Labour, the Greens and Te Pāti Māori. Workplace Relations and Safety Minister Brooke van Velden argued the legislation would provide employers and employees with certainty and allow the removal of difficult employees. By contrast, Labour's Workplace Relations and Safety spokesperson Camilla Belich criticised the repeal as an attack on working people. By further contrast, The Treasury published a review of the prior 90-day trial which started in 2009. The authors concluded that the main benefit of the policy was a decrease in dismissal costs for firms, while many employees faced increased uncertainty about their job security for three months after being hired. That same day, Reti announced that the Government would invest NZ$50 million over the two next years to help Māori health providers boost immunisation rates within the Māori community.

=== 2024 ===
On 12 January, Foreign Minister Peters and Defence Minister Judith Collins expressed New Zealand's support for Anglo-American airstrikes against Iranian-backed Houthi forces in Yemen, which had been disrupting international shipping in response to the Gaza war.

On 14 January, Transport Minister Brown confirmed the cancellation of Auckland light rail, stating the projected NZ$29.2 billion cost of the project. He also criticised the previous Labour Government for spending NZ$228 million on the project over the past six years with little to show for it.

On 23 January, the Government dispatched six New Zealand Defence Force (NZDF) personnel to the Middle East in response to the 2024 missile strikes in Yemen to help provide maritime security including "precision targeting." The opposition Labour and Green parties criticised the deployment, citing the lack of a United Nations mandate and claiming it would inflame tensions respectively. Though Foreign Minister Peters rejected any connection between New Zealand's Yemen military contribution and the Gaza war, University of Otago geopolitical analyst Geoffrey Miller opined that this development could mark the end of New Zealand's "independent" foreign policy due to the Government's support for the Anglo-American military actions in Yemen.

On 26 January, Local Government Minister Simeon Brown confirmed that the Government would halt plans by the previous Labour Government to introduce legislation to lower the voting age to 16 years for local council elections. Also on this day, Finance Minister Nicola Willis asked "all departments" to identify savings to cut annual public service spending by $1.5 billion. Agencies have been asked to identify savings options of either 6.5 or 7.5 percent. As at 6 April, at least 845 job losses have been signalled, according to figures made public by ministries and the Public Service Association. Some confusion was evident over whether the Suicide Prevention Office would close or not.

On 30 January, Luxon announced that New Zealand would be suspending its annual NZ$1 million aid to UNRWA (the United Nations Relief and Works Agency for Palestinian Refugees in the Near East) in light of allegations that at least 12 UNRWA workers had participated in the 7 October Hamas-led attack on Israel.

On 1 February 2024, Peters and Collins met with Australian Foreign Minister Penny Wong and Defence Minister Richard Marles in Melbourne to discuss New Zealand's involvement in the AUKUS Pillar Two developments. Marles confirmed that Australia would send officials to brief their New Zealand counterparts about Pillar Two, which would focus on advanced military technology including quantum computing and artificial intelligence. New Zealand is not expected to join AUKUS Pillar One due to its nuclear-free policy. The two governments also committed to reinforced security cooperation in the Indo-Pacific and increased military integration between the Australian and New Zealand militaries.

That same day, Workplace Relations and Safety Minister Brooke van Velden confirmed that the Government would raise the minimum wage by two percent to NZ$23.15 an hour from 1 April 2024. On 2 February, the Government confirmed that it would expand the scope of the Royal Commission of Inquiry into COVID-19 Lessons Learned to include lockdowns, vaccine procurement, the socio-economic impact of the COVID-19 pandemic, the cost-effectiveness of the Government's policies, social disruptions caused by the Government's policies, and whether the Government response was consistent with the rule of law.

On 11 February 2024, Luxon and Emergency Management and Recovery Minister Mark Mitchell announced that the Government would contribute NZ$63 million to aid the removal of sediment and debris caused by Cyclone Gabrielle in the Hawke's Bay and Gisborne District. That same day, Social Development Minister Louise Upston confirmed that the Government would introduce a "traffic light system" to combat "entrenched welfare dependency" including the use of sanctions and mandatory community work experience, a 2023 election campaign promise. In response, Green Party social development spokesperson Ricardo Menéndez March claimed the Government's welfare policies were cruel and would reinforce the cycle of poverty.

On 14 February, the Government passed legislation repealing the previous Labour Government's Three Waters reform programme under urgency. While National, ACT and NZ First supported the bill, it was opposed by the Labour, Green, and Māori parties. Local Government Minister Brown also announced that the Government would introduce two new laws in 2024 and 2025 rolling its own "Local Water Done Well" programme, which would emphasise local control over water infrastructure and services. The Government also announced that the replacement legislation would allow local councils to voluntarily form their own water services groupings and council-controlled organisations similar to Wellington Water and Auckland's Watercare Services.

On 19 February, Social Development Minister Louise Upston announced a ramping up of benefit sanctions from June 2024 including "work check-ins" for jobseekers who have been on a benefit for at least six months. Luxon confirmed the check-ins would not apply to those on a sole parent or supported living benefits.

On 22 February, the Government extended the New Zealand Defence Force's Ukrainian training deployment to June 2025. Foreign Minister Peters also confirmed that New Zealand would contribute a NZ$25.9 million military, humanitarian and reconstruction aid package to Ukraine, bringing NZ's total aid contribution since the Russian invasion of Ukraine to over NZ$100 million.

On 25 February, Justice Minister Paul Goldsmith and Police Minister Mark Mitchell announced that the Government would introduce legislation to ban gang insignia in public places, empower Police to stop criminal gangs from gathering and gang members from communicating, and giving greater weight to gang membership during sentencing.

On 28 February 2024, the Government passed urgent legislation disestablishing Te Aka Whai Ora (the Māori Health Authority) and repealing the Smokefree Environments and Regulated Products (Smoked Tobacco) Amendment Act 2022. That same day, the Government designated the entire Hamas organisation as a terrorist entity. Previous governments had only designated the military wing of Hamas as a terrorist organisation. In addition, the Government barred entry to several extremist Israeli settlers who had attacked Palestinians in the West Bank. The Government also extended sanctions against Russia.

On 5 March, Minister for Children Karen Chhour announced that the Government would be launching a pilot boot camp for youth offenders run by Oranga Tamariki (the Ministry for Children) in mid 2024. On 6 March, the Government passed urgent legislation ending taxpayer funding for cultural reports.

On 7 March, the Government introduced legislation to fast-track the resource consent process for significant projects and allow overseas investors to invest in rental housing developments. On 8 March, Reti announced that the Government would focus on meeting five health targets in the areas of cancer treatment, child immunisation, shorter stays in emergency departments, and shorter wait times for special assessments and treatments.

On 10 March, Associate Finance Minister David Seymour announced that the Government would restore interest deductions on residential investment properties. The government has increased allocations for the landlord tax deductions by $800 million, from $2.1 billion to $2.9 billion. From 1 April 2024, landlords will be able to write off 80 percent of their mortgage interest on residential investment properties, and 100 percent from 1 April 2025.

On 13 March, Workplace Relations Minister Brooke Van Velden confirmed that the Government was planning to overhaul health and safety regulations and amend the Holiday Act 2003. While Business NZ welcomed the proposed changes, First Union New Zealand denounced the proposed changes as an attack on workers. That same day, the Government confirmed plans to upgrade Linton Military Camp's dilapidated barracks as the first project of its new flagship public-private infrastructure financing programme.

On 14 March, Associate Environment Minister Andrew Hoggard announced that the government would suspend the obligation for councils to impose Significant Natural Areas (SNAs) under the previous Labour Government's National Policy Statement for Indigenous Biodiversity for three years, while the Resource Management Act 1991 is being replaced. Their protection was previously required under the Resource Management Act 1991. On 15 March he released a statement saying his 14 March comment had been misunderstood and that there had been no changes to statutory and regulatory obligations for local council. University of Otago law Professor Andrew Geddis said the statement was "misleading at best, and borderline unlawful at worst. No minister can by mere announcement remove an existing legal obligation imposed by a parliamentary enactment."

Between 10 and 16 March 2024, Peters undertook a tour of India, Indonesia and Singapore where he met with several foreign political and business leaders. Peters stated that the coalition government regarded South and Southeast Asia as a priority in "maintaining and building New Zealand's security and prosperity." On 14 March, Peters attracted media attention after making remarks during an interview with the Indian media outlet The Indian Express that appeared to cast doubt on Canadian assertions that the Indian Government was responsible for assassinating Canadian Sikh independence activist Hardeep Singh Nijjar. MFAT and Peters clarified that New Zealand's position on the matter remained unchanged during the course of the investigation. On 18 March, Peters hosted Chinese Foreign Minister Wang Yi during his state visit to Wellington. The two leaders discussed a range of issues important to China-New Zealand relations including economic relations, people-to-people relations links, bilateral cooperation as well as differences on human rights issues and China's territorial claims to the South China Sea and Taiwan Strait.

On 18 March, Housing Minister Chris Bishop and Finance Minister Nicola Willis ordered state housing provider Kāinga Ora to end the previous Government's "Sustainable Tenancies Framework" and take disciplinary action against unruly tenants and those with overdue rent including evictions and relocations.

On 19 March Disabilities Minister Penny Simmonds announced the Government would eliminate respite care funding for families with disabled children due to budgetary reasons. On 20 March, Simmonds said Ministry for Disabled People had done an inadequate job in conveying changes to disabled people's funding and suggested some families were wasting their funding on "massages, overseas travel and pedicures". The changes have caused widespread anguish within the disabled community with a petition opposing the changes attracting more than 10,000 signatures in 24 hours. In response to criticism, Finance Minister Willis called officials and Simmonds for an urgent briefing, after families were blindsided by news of cuts to respite care.

On 19 March, Transport Minister Simeon Brown confirmed that the Government would reduce the proposed road user charge on hybrid vehicles from NZ$53 per 1,000 km to NZ$38. Earlier, the Parliamentary transport select committee had adopted a Labour and Green proposal to reduce the road user charge for hybrid vehicles to NZ$38 against the wishes of committee chair and NZ First MP Andy Foster. In mid January 2024, the Government had announced that it would implement road user charges on both electric vehicles and plug-in hybrids from 1 April 2024.

On 20 March, Associate Health Minister Casey Costello announced that the Government would introduce legislation to ban disposable vapes, and increase the maximum fine from selling to under-18s from $10,000 to $100,000. On 11 July, Chief Ombudsman Judge Peter Boshier took the rare step of forcing Costello to apologise to public broadcaster RNZ and to University of Otago Professor of Public Health Janet Hoek for her handling of OIA requests, and for trying to keep information about tobacco and vaping policy secret. In an interview on Newstalk ZB, Costello said the information was an "extraction of a whole lot of historical documents. She said. "I'm not sure who put it on my desk." On 18 July, Casey Costello cut the excise rate on Heated tobacco products (HTPs) by 50 percent effective from 1 July. Costello said she aims to make them more attractive as an alternative to smoking. The Ministry of Health disagreed with the change saying "there is no evidence to support HTPs use as a quit smoking tool". On 19 September, Casey Costello was again reprimanded by the Chief Ombudsman for her handling of a mystery document containing tobacco-industry friendly ideas. He said he is "concerned the associate minister was unable to produce any records about the provenance of the notes". Costello also told the Chief Ombudsman "the likely source was a political party staffer or volunteer". When Costello released the mystery document to RNZ under the Official Information Act she made redactions under a clause of the OIA which protects the "confidentiality of advice tendered by ministers of the Crown and officials". Costello initially denied the document existed at all.

On 27 March, the Government passed major tax legislation restoring interest deductibility for residential investment property, reducing the bright-line test for residential property to two years, and eliminating depreciation deductions for commercial and industrial buildings that were reinstated by the previous Labour government as part of its economic response to the COVID-19 pandemic. On 28 March, the Government passed legislation requiring electric cars and plug-in hybrids to pay road user charges. That same day, Fisheries Minister Shane Jones announced the Government had halted work on legislation to create a 620,000sqkm ocean sanctuary around the Kermadec Islands.

On 2 April, Luxon announced a 36-point full second quarter action plan for the next three months, focusing on the economy and cost of living, law and order, and public services. Notable policies and priorities have included reducing wasteful spending while investing in "frontline" services, legislating on income tax relief, childcare tax credit, improving the rental marketing, and reintroducing charter schools, keeping agriculture out of the Emissions Trading Scheme, reversing the ban on offshore gas and oil exploration, restoring three strikes legislation, reviewing the firearms registry, establishing a Youth Serious Offender Category, improving teacher training and school attendance, and taking steps to replace mega polytechnic Te Pūkenga.

On 3 April, Associate Education Minister David Seymour announced the creation of an establishment board to introduce a new charter school model, that would be expected to launch by the start of the 2025 school year. On 4 April, Local Government Minister Simeon Brown announced that local and regional councils that introduced Māori wards and constituencies without polling residents would have to hold referendums or dissolve the wards they had established. On 7 April, Immigration Minister Erica Stanford announced that the Government would be revising the Accredited Employer Worker Visa program to address migrant exploitation and "unsustainable" net migration. A new immigration rule requiring low-skilled immigrants to leave the country and apply for a new visa was criticised by Jagjeet Singh Sidhu, who said it would impact not only businesses but workers and their families. He organised a petition opposing the change.

On 9 April, the Government passed a new law allowing 11 pseudoephedrine cold and flu medicines to be sold without prescriptions from June 2024; reversing a 2011 law change meant to combat their use in the production of methamphetamine.

On 14 April, a plethora of "sensible, pro-tenant" changes were announced to help increase the supply of rental properties. The changes include re-introducing 90-day "no-cause" terminations for periodic tenancies, meaning landlords can end a periodic tenancy without giving any reason. For fixed-term tenancies, the ability for landlords to end a tenancy, without giving a specific reason will also be re-introduced. For periodic tenancies, landlords will now only need to give 42 days' notice for ending a tenancy. Back in May 2023, Chris Bishop said a charity group working with homeless people told him to bring back "no-cause" evictions. Bishop didn't respond to a request for a hint as to the identity of the charities he talked to.

On 15 April, the Government released its pet bond policy for tenants. The pet bond would be worth two weeks' rent and could be added to existing bonds. Tenants would be responsible for any damage caused by their pets and would have to seek their landlords' consent. That same day, Luxon and Peters condemned Iranian airstrikes against Israel.

Between 14 and 21 April, Luxon undertook a tour of Singapore, Thailand and the Philippines as part of a "very deliberate" foreign policy reset meant to shore up Southeast Asia's strategic and commercial importance to New Zealand. He met with foreign leaders including Singaporean Prime Minister Lee Hsien Loong, Thai Prime Minister Srettha Thavisin and Philippines President Bongbong Marcos to strengthen bilateral relations in the areas of trade, tourism, defence and climate change.

On 16 April, Associate Education Minister Seymour announced several changes to the early childhood sector including easing qualification requirements for teachers, allowing the government to decide the location of early childhood centres, and introducing mandatory reporting of child abuse. On 21 April, Commerce and Consumer Affairs Minister Andrew Bayly and Housing Minister Chris Bishop announced that the Government would ease lending policies to make it easier for people to obtain housing loans, revoke the previous Government's affordability regulations and revise dispute resolution rules.

On 22 April, Luxon and Associate Justice Minister Nicole McKee confirmed that the Government would proceed with plans to reintroduce three strikes legislation, which had been repealed by the previous Labour Government. On 23 April, RMA Reform Minister Chris Bishop announced that the Government would scrap or amend farming, mining and other industrial regulations as part of its planned overhaul of the Resource Management Act 1991.

On 29 April, Education Minister Erica Stanford announced the Government's top six educational priorities to mark the start of the second term. These included a clearer curriculum, a focus on literacy and numeracy, more consistent assessment and achievement reporting, better teacher training, targeted support for students with special needs and an evidence-based approach to improvement. That same day, the Government's school cellphone ban came into force. On 30 April, Energy Minister Simeon Brown confirmed that the Government would invest in 25 new high speed electric vehicle charging facilities along key routes between major urban centres.

On 1 May, Seymour confirmed that the Government would continue to fund the free school lunches programme for a few years until the completion of a review into the programme. In April 2024, Health Coalition Aotearoa organised a petition calling for the continuation of the free school lunch programme, which was received by Labour MP Jan Tinetti. On 2 May, Education Minister Stanford confirmed that the Government would be instituted a structured literacy reading approach in all state schools from the first term of the 2025 school year. Due to the planned shift towards a structured literacy approach, the Government also announced the termination of the existing Reading Recovery programme, which uses a "whole language" approach based on using pictures to help children guess words.

On 2 May, in an interview on RNZ's Morning Report programme, Winston Peters criticised the former Australian senator Bob Carr's views on the security partnership between Australia, the United Kingdom and the United States. RNZ has removed the comments from the interview online after Carr, who was Australia's foreign minister from 2012 to 2013, told RNZ he considered the remarks to be "entirely defamatory" and would commence legal action. Lawyers for Bob Carr have confirmed they are looking to commence defamation proceedings against Foreign Minister Winston Peters. In a letter, Carr's lawyers said Peters' statements in an interview on RNZ this morning are "indefensibly defamatory" and have "no basis in fact". In the interview Peters criticised the former Australian senator's views on the AUKUS security partnership. He also made allegations concerning Carr's relationship with China.

On 5 May Luxon, Brown and Mayor of Auckland Wayne Brown jointly announced that Auckland would avoid a 25.8 percent rates increase as part of the Government's Local Water Done Well plan. On 6 May Luxon and Police and Corrections Minister Mitchell announced that the Government would allocate NZ$1.9 billion from the upcoming 2024 New Zealand budget to training 470 new corrections officers and adding 810 beds to Waikeria Prison.

On 8 May, Seymour announced the Government's modified school lunch programme. Under the revised scheme, 10,000 pre-schoolers in low-equity, non-profit early childhood centres would be eligible for free morning tea and lunch five days a week at a cost of NZ$4 million. While the school lunch programme would remained unchanged for primary school students in 2025, the school lunch programme for intermediate and high school students would be bulk-purchased by the Government and delivered to schools. During the press announcement, Seymour also said that the bulk-purchased food would consist of sandwiches and fruit rather than sushi, quinoa, couscous, and hummus.

Between 11 and 18 May, Foreign Minister Peters led a delegation of New Zealand MPs including Health Minister Dr Reti, Climate Change Minister Simon Watts, the NZ Parliament's Foreign Affairs, Defence and Trade Committee chairperson Tim van de Molen, and Labour's foreign affairs spokesperson David Parker on a tour of Solomon Islands, Papua New Guinea, Vanuatu, New Caledonia and Tuvalu. Besides strengthening bilateral relations, the tour covered various issues including climate change, development policies and stability. On 12 May, Peters met with Solomon Islands Prime Minister Jeremiah Manele, who had succeeded Manasseh Sogavare following the 2024 Solomon Islands general election. The New Caledonia visit was cancelled due to the 2024 New Caledonia unrest. Between 21 and 28 May, the Government sent the Royal New Zealand Air Force to evacuate stranded New Zealanders and other foreign nationals from New Caledonia.

On 14 May, Police Commissioner Andrew Coster and Police Minister Mitchell confirmed that the Police would establish a national gang unit, with district units nationwide. That same day, Seymour announced that the Government would allocate NZ$153 million from the 2024 Budget to convert 35 state schools into charter schools and create 15 new charter schools between 2025 and 2026.

Following a critical review by Sir Bill English into housing provider Kāinga Ora's borrowing and spending practices, Luxon and Housing Minister Chris Bishop announced on 20 May a multi-year revamp of the agency including replacing the leadership board, realigning contractual arrangements across Kāinga Ora and community housing providers, simplifying the agency's directive and requiring the new leadership board to develop a plan to improve financial performance and reduce losses. On 21 May, Newshub reported that the Government would scrap Kāinga Ora's NZ$60 million first-home grant programme and redirect the money towards social housing as part of the 2024 Budget. On 22 May, the Government confirmed that it would provide NZ$24 million over four years to the I Am Hope Foundation for its Gumboot Friday youth counselling programme.

On 26 May, Education Minister Stanford announced that the Government would invest NZ$53 million in education including in-school training for new teachers and recruiting, retaining and training 1,500 new teachers over the next four years. On 30 May, Finance Minister Willis released the 2024 New Zealand budget, which delivered NZ$14 billion worth of tax cuts ranging from NZ$4 and NZ$40 a fortnight for all workers earning more than NZ$14,000. While the incumbent National, ACT and New Zealand First parties supported the budget as "fiscally responsible," the opposition Labour, Green parties and Te Pāti Māori criticised the budget's tax cuts for hurting the poor and public service. Te Pāti Māori and Toitū Te Tiriti (Honour the Treaty) movement also staged nationwide protests against the Government's policies towards Māori to coincide with the budget's release.

In early June 2024, Luxon visited Niuean Premier Dalton Tagelagi. On 5 June, Luxon announced an agreement to enhance the free association relationship between the two countries and that New Zealand would invest NZ$20.5 million into a new large-scale renewable energy project on Niue. On 7 June, Foreign Minister Peters announced that New Zealand would resume its annual NZ$1 million funding to UNRWA (the United Nations Relief and Works Agency) that month. That same day, the Government discontinued funding for the Mongrel Mob's controversial drug rehabilitation programme Kahukura, which had been supported by the previous Labour Government. On 9 June, Minister for Resources Shane Jones announced that the Government would introduce legislation to reverse the previous Labour Government's ban on oil and gas exploration in the second half of 2024.

On 11 June, Housing Minister Chris Bishop confirmed that the Government would introduce legislation to amend the Overseas Investment Amendment Act 2005 to better support the Government's "Build to Rent" housing development programme. That same day, Agricultural Minister Todd McClay confirmed that the Government would exclude agriculture from the NZ emissions trading scheme (ETS). On 14 June, Associate Justice Minister Nicole McKee confirmed that the Government would introduce new firearms legislation by 2026 to replace the Arms Act 1983. That same day, the Government cancelled the annual service charges for forestry under the ETS, which amounts to NZ$30.25 per hectare.

On 17 June, Acting Prime Minister Winston Peters and Housing Minister Chris Bishop announced that the Government would begin consultation on policy changes that would allow "granny flats" (or dwellings of 60 meters or less) to be built without undergoing the resource consent process. On 20 June, Luxon signed a bilateral intelligence sharing agreement with Japanese Prime Minister Fumio Kishida during a state visit to Japan. The visit was complicated by a breakdown on the RNZAF's Boeing 757 jet carrying Luxon and a business delegation during a refuelling stop in Papua New Guinea.

On 23 June Luxon, Mitchell and Chhour announced that the Government would be introducing legislation to create a new Youth Serious Offender sentencing category, that would allow 14–17 year olds to be sent to military-style boot camps. A pilot military-style training programme is expected to launch in late July 2024. Mitchell and Police Commissioner Andrew Coster also announced that new community police teams would be established in major cities nationwide.

On 24 June, Health Minister Reti announced that the Government would be investing NZ$604 million over the next four years in boosting Pharmac funding for 54 new medicines including 26 cancer treatments. He reiterated that the Government would be able to fulfill its election promise of funding 13 cancer drugs. That same day, Luxon and Social Development and Employment Minister Louise Upston confirmed that job seeker beneficiaries would be required to attend a job search seminar after six months, with the exception of those receiving disability and health condition payments.

On 25 June, the Government introduced legislation to reinstate the three-strikes legislation that was repealed by the previous Labour government. That same day, Internal Affairs Minister Van Velden announced the terms of reference for the second phase of the Royal Commission of Inquiry into COVID-19 Lessons Learned, which is expected to run between November 2024 and February 2025.

On 26 June, Justice Minister Paul Goldsmith said the Government would encourage judges to hand down "cumulative" sentences for offences committed on parole, bail or in custody. Earlier, the Government had announced it would require "cumulative" sentences for such offenses but backtracked due to concerns about increasing the prison population. On 27 June, Immigration Minister Stanford announced that low-skilled Accredited Employer Work Visa (AEWV) holders would no longer be able to sponsor work, visitor or student visa applications for partners and dependent children. Changes to the AEWV scheme were prompted by the Government's desire to strike a balance between recruiting highly skilled migrants and reducing pressure on infrastructure, health and education services.

On 1 July, Luxon released the Government's 40 point "Q3 Action Plan," which included passing legislation requiring local councils to develop plans for "sustainable" water services, banning gang insignia, empowering police to confiscate firearms from criminals and launching a pilot boot camp programme for youth offenders. On 2 July, the Government announced that it would progress the Fair Digital News Bargaining Bill, which had been introduced by the previous Labour Government. The Bill was supported by all parliamentary parties except the ACT party, which invoked the "agree to disagree" provision within its coalition agreement with National. On 3 July, Luxon and Stanford confirmed that the Government would be introducing standardised testing for primary school students from 2026. On 4 July, Luxon and Mental Health Minister Matt Doocey released new mental health targets including ensuring that 80% of patients were seen within three weeks. On 6 July, the Government contributed $3 million to flood recovery efforts in Wairoa following the 2024 East Coast floods.

On 9 July, Building and Construction Minister Chris Penk announced plans to make remote virtual inspections the default for building consents across New Zealand in an effort to boost the building process. During the second week of July, Luxon attended the 2024 Washington summit where he represented New Zealand as an Indo-Pacific ally of the United States. Besides meeting both Democratic and Republican legislators, Luxon also met with United States President Joe Biden at a White House dinner. In addition, Luxon allocated NZ$16 million worth of aid to Ukraine prior to a scheduled meeting with Ukrainian President Volodymyr Zelenskyy on 12 July.

On 10 July, Climate Change Minister Simon Watts released the Government's climate change strategy on 10 July 2024 and announced that the Government would seek consultation for its 2024–2030 emissions reduction plan. On 11 July, Goldsmith and McKee announced the formation of a new retail crime advisory group to combat retail crime. On 12 July, the Government extended the NZ Defence Force's deployment to US-led efforts to combat Houthi forces in the Red Sea from 31 July 2024 to 31 January 2025.

As part of the Government's cost-cutting measures, the Ministry of Education halted 100 school building projects in late July 2024 in order to save NZ$2 billion. Several school leaders including Beach Haven School principal Stephanie Thompson, Burnside High School principal Scott Haines and Ashburton College principal Simon Coleman expressed concerns that these cutbacks would affect plans to upgrade dilapidated facilities and expand classroom space to accommodate more students.

On 30 July, the Government set aside NZ$216 million in order to pay for tax cuts it might need to fund tax cuts for heated tobacco products. That same day, Parliament passed legislation reinstating the requirement for local referendums on the establishment or "ongoing use" of Māori wards and constituencies. While National, ACT and NZ First supported the bill, it was opposed by the Labour, Green, and Māori parties.|Councils that have already established a Māori ward without a referendum are now required to hold a binding poll alongside the 2025 New Zealand local elections or to disestablish them.

On 2 August, Attorney-General Judith Collins confirmed that the Government would not progress eight of the 44 recommendations of the "Royal Commission of Inquiry into the Terrorist Attack on Christchurch Mosques" including creating a new national intelligence and security agency, establishing an advisory group on counter-terrorism, instituting mandatory reporting of firearms injuries and amending the Crimes Act 1961 to criminalise inciting religious or racial disharmony.

On 4 August, Stanford and Luxon announced a "Maths Action Plan" including a new mathematics curriculum from 2025, twice-annual maths assessments, funding for teaching professional development, and raising maths entry requirements for new teachers. In response, the New Zealand Educational Institute expressed concerns that rapid changes to the maths and literacy curriculum and the short teaching training timeframe would strain the workforce without delivering on its goals.

On 8 August, Local Government Minister Simeon Brown announced that council-controlled organisations would be able to borrow money for water infrastructure through the Local Government Funding Agency. On 9 August, Immigration New Zealand announced that they would be raising a range of visa fees from 1 October in line with the National Government's policy of shifting the visa processing system towards a "user-pay system" in order to reduce taxes. That same day, the Ministry of Social Development announced that it would tighten emergency housing eligibility criteria and obligations from 26 August as part of Government policy to reduce the usage of motels as emergency housing.

On 12 August, Social Development Minister Louise Upston announced the introduction of the traffic light system for the Jobseeker Support benefit, effective immediately, with legislation to expand the system to be introduced in November and expected to come into force in early 2025. She promised that the rule of preventing sanctions from cutting benefit pay by more than 50 per cent of job seekers who had children would remain in place. On 13 August, Crown–Māori Relations Minister Tama Potaka announced that Te Arawhiti's (the Office for Māori Crown Relations) monitoring and Treaty of Waitangi settlements compliance functions would be shifted to Te Puni Kōkiri (the Ministry for Māori Development). That same day, the Minister of Science, Innovation and Technology Judith Collins announced plans to introduce legislation to end the ban on genetic modification and genetic engineering outside laboratories. On 15 August, Upston announced that Whaikaha - Ministry of Disabled People would be restructured as a policy and advisory department and that its support service delivery functions would be assumed by the Ministry of Social Development.

On 28 August, Infrastructure Minister Chris Bishop announced that a new National Infrastructure Agency would commence operations from 1 December as part of a restructuring of the government's various infrastructure agencies. That same day, the Government passed legislation requiring local councils to develop plans for delivering drinking water, wastewater and stormwater services. Under the new legislation, water services regulator Taumata Arowai would no longer have to consider Te Mana o te Wai and National Policy Statement for Freshwater Management when setting their wastewater standards. On 29 August, Disabilities Minister Louis Upston announced that the Government would raise fines for illegally parking in disabled car parks from NZ$150 to NZ$750 effective 1 October 2024.

On 2 September, Transport Minister Simeon Brown unveiled the Government's National Land Transport Programme, which would invest NZ$32.9 billion in building 17 "Roads of National Significance" over the next three years. On 3 September, Tourism Minister Matt Doocey announced that the International Visitor Conservation and Tourism Levy (IVL) on most international tourists would be raised from NZ$35 to NZ$100 from 1 October 2024.

On 11 September, Parliament passed a private member's bill amending the Fair Trading Act 1986 to ensure that gift cards have a minimum expiry date of three years from their initial purchase. The bill was supported by all parties except ACT. On 13 September, the Cabinet Office issued a new directive that public services should be delivered based on "need" rather than "race," fulfilling a coalition agreement secured by ACT and NZ First. The Government also scrapped a Labour Government policy that government agencies should ensure that at least 8% of annual procurement contracts be awarded to Māori businesses. Earlier in the week, Health Minister Reti had instructed Hawke's Bay health services to stop prioritising young Māori and Pasifika youths for free doctor and nurse visits on the basis of ethnicity.

On 19 September, the Government passed two new laws banning Gang patches and making gang membership an aggravating sentencing factor. While National, ACT and NZ First supported the bill, it was opposed by the Labour, Green, and Māori parties. That same day, Transport Minister Brown announced that the Government would roll out new data collection vans to assess the condition of New Zealand roads and prevent potholes. On 20 September, RMA Reform Minister Bishop announced that the Government would introduce two new laws to replace the Resource Management Act 1991. One law would focus on managing the environmental effects of development activities while the second would enable urban development and infrastructure. That same day, Luxon said that the coalition government planned to propose a referendum to extend the parliamentary term from three to four years at the 2026 general election.

On 25 September, the Government passed legislation reviving charter schools. On 26 September, Associate Education Minister Seymour announce the Government would prosecute parents for persistent truancy and remove teacher-only days during school term time. In addition, Education Minister Stanford reallocated NZ$30 million from the "Te Ahu o te Reo Māori" teacher training programme to revamping the mathematics curriculum. Health Minister Reti and Infrastructure Minister Bishop also confirmed that the Government would be scaling back Dunedin Hospital rebuild significantly, citing its projected NZ$3 billion cost and renovation projects at other regional hospitals. That same day Science, Innovation and Technology Minister Judith Collins announced plans to give the National Institute of Water and Atmospheric Research (NIWA) oversight over fellow weather forecaster and MetService to improve the national weather forecasting system.

On 26 September, Trade Minister Todd McClay announced that New Zealand had signed a free trade agreement with the United Arab Emirates that would remove duties on 99% of New Zealand exports over the next three years. On 30 September, the Government released its fourth-quarter action plan with 43 targets including passing the Fast-track Approvals Bill and the first RMA reform bill, establishing the National Infrastructure Funding and Financing agency, expanding free breast cancer screening and introducing legislation to combat foreign interference. On 4 October, Education Minister Stanford and Infrastructure Minister Bishop announced that the Government would consider establishing a new government agency separate from the Education Ministry to manage school property and assets.

On 5 October, Transport Minister Brown announced a NZ$226 million roads and highways resilience package to reduce the impact of severe weather events. On 14 October Conservation Minister Tama Potaka announced 19 new marine protection areas in the Hauraki Gulf.

On 21 October, Associate Health Minister Costello announced a NZ$21 million funding boost for ambulance provider Hato Hone St John. On 22 October, Associate Education Minister Seymour released the Government's revised school meal programme, which he claimed would save $130 million. That same day, the Government appointed a Crown observer to oversee the Wellington City Council in response to the council's budgetary problems. On 23 October, the Government passed new legislation to ease the "regulatory burden" on the country's farming, mining and other primary industries. On 31 October, Trade Minister McClay confirmed that New Zealand had reached a free trade agreement with the six-member Gulf Cooperation Council (GCC). As part of the agreement, tariffs would be lifted on 51% of New Zealand exports to GCC member states while 99% of New Zealand exports to the GCC would become duty-free over a period of 10 years.

On 10 November, the Government allocated NZ$20 million from the Regional Infrastructure Fund to building upgrades and repairs at the Waitangi Treaty Grounds and Rātana Pā. On 12 November, Luxon delivered the Government's apology to survivors of abuse in state and faith-based care at Parliament. On the same day, the Government introduced legislation dealing with abuse in care including banning strip searches on children and strengthening security checks for people working with children.

On 14 November, the ACT party's contentious Treaty Principles Bill passed its first reading with the support of National and NZ First. The bill has triggered much controversy and opposition. Public submissions on the bill opened on 19 November, and are expected to close on 7 January 2025.

On 4 December 2024, Minister of Science, Innovation and Technology Judith Collins announced that the Government would end Marsden grants for humanities and social science research in order to focus on "core sciences" like physics, chemistry, mathematics, engineering and biomedical sciences that would boost economic growth, scientific and technological development.

On 12 December 2024, the Government passed legislation introducing its pet bonds for tenants and reinstating 90-day no-cause evictions. On 13 December, the Government passed legislation reinstating three-strikes laws. While the governing National, ACT and NZ First parties supported the Bill, it was opposed by the opposition Labour, Green and Māori parties. That same day, the Government abandoned plans to progress the Fair Digital News Bargaining Bill, with Goldsmith saying that it was on hold because it was "not ready." On 17 December, The Government's contentious Fast-track Approvals Bill passed into law.

Following the 2024 Port Vila earthquake on 17 December, the Government dispatched two aircraft carrying New Zealand Defence Force, Urban Search and Rescue and MFAT personnel, equipment and supplies to assist with post-disaster rescue and relief efforts. One of these aircraft, a RNZAF C-130 Hercules, was diverted to New Caledonia after an engine fire warning. Former defence minister and Labour MP Peeni Henare criticised the Government for dispatching an older Hercules aircraft rather than a newer aircraft.

On 19 December, Tertiary Education Minister Penny Simmonds and Associate Education Minister David Seymour announced that the Government planned to amend the Education and Training Act 2020 to strengthen universities' free speech obligations.

=== 2025 ===
On 13 January 2025, the New Zealand government representatives including Trade Minister McClay and Prime Minister Luxon signed a comprehensive economic partnership agreement with the United Arab Emirates, cutting tariffs on 98.5% of New Zealand exports to the UAE. On 17 January 2025, Māori Development Minister Tama Potaka announced an overhaul of the Waitangi Tribunal's membership, appointing eight new members including New Zealand On Air board member Philip Crump and former Defence Minister and Mayor of Carterton Ron Mark.

On 23 January, Luxon gave his State of the Nation address and announced that the Crown Research Institutes would be merged into three new Public Research Organisations and that a fourth focusing on "advanced technology" would be established. In addition, Luxon also confirmed the Government would establish a new foreign investment agency called Invest New Zealand to boost productivity and innovation.

On 27 January, Minister for Economic Growth Nicola Willis announced the launch of a new digital nomads visa that would allow non-citizens to work remotely in New Zealand for up to nine months. That same day, Foreign Minister Winston Peters initiated a review of New Zealand's aid programme to Kiribati after Kiribati President Taneti Maamau cancelled three pre-arranged meetings including one scheduled for mid January 2025. The Government had wanted to discuss how NZ$102 million worth of aid money allocated to Kiribati between 2021 and 2024 was being spent.

On 29 January, Luxon and Transport Minister Bishop confirmed that the Government would reverse blanket speed limits on 38 sections of the New Zealand state highway network and seek public consultation on raising the speed limits for another 49 state highway sections. On 30 January 2025, Parliament passed the Taranaki Maunga Collective Redress Bill, which conferred legal personhood on Mount Taranaki. The Government also apologised to eight Māori iwi for confiscating Mount Taranaki and 1.2 million acres of Māori lands in the Taranaki region.

On 7 February, Peters criticised Cook Islands Prime Minister Mark Brown for not consulting New Zealand on a planned partnership agreement with China, describing it as a breach of the free association agreement between the two countries. In response, Brown countered that the partnership agreement did not involve security and defence matters, and defended the decision not to consult New Zealand. Following the agreement's ratification in mid-February 2025, Peters confirmed the Government would be examining the agreement in light of New Zealand's interests and relationship with the Cook Islands.

On 9 February, Luxon and Willis announced that the Government would replace its Active Investor Plus visa to with two new investment visa categories in order to attract wealthy investors to New Zealand. First, the "Growth" category focuses on higher-risk investments in New Zealand and comes with a minimum deposit of NZ$5 million over a three-year period. Second, the "Balanced" category focuses on mixed and lower risk developments including property, and comes with a minimum deposit of NZ$10 over a five-year period. Other changes include broadening the scope for investments and removing the English language requirement. On 10 February, the Government released its first quarterly action plan for 2025 which included easing investor visa requirements, hosting an international investment summit in mid-March 2025, launching a minerals strategy, introducing roadside drug testing and rolling out phonics checks in primary schools. On 12 February 2025, Jones announced that the Government was proposing changes to the Quota Management System including excluding ship camera footage from Official Information Act requests.

On 19 February, Stanford confirmed that the Government had established a NZ$2 million dual purpose fund to honour children who had died in care in unmarked graves and support community initiatives for abuse survivors as part of efforts to address its abuse in care commitments. On 25 February, Stanford confirmed that the Government would ease residency rules to address a national shortage of primary school teachers. On 26 February, Goldsmith and McKee confirmed that Government would introduce legislation expanding citizen's arrest powers to combat retail crime. That same day, Peters met with Chinese Foreign Minister Wang Yi in Beijing to raise concerns about Chinese naval exercises in the Tasman Sea. On 27 February, Goldsmith confirmed that the Government would introduce legislation to extend the parliamentary term from three to four years, subject to a referendum.

On 3 March, Luxon and Health Minister Brown launched a two-year program to recruit 100 overseas-trained doctors to address a national shortage of doctors. On 6 March, Brown confirmed the Government would lower the bowel screening eligibility age range from 60 to 58 years, using funding from a cancelled programme established by the previous Labour government to lower the eligibility age for Māori and Pasifika New Zealanders from 60 to 50. On 7 March, Brown announced a major overhaul of Health New Zealand including reinstating its leadership board, decentralisation and promoting private-public partnership.

On 12 March, Economic Growth Minister Willis proposed scrapping 24 procurement rules for government contracts and introducing a new economic benefits test. On 13 March, the Government held an Infrastructure Investment Summit in Auckland to generate international investment in New Zealand's infrastructure.

Between 15 and 19 March, Luxon and Trade Minister Todd McClay led a trade delegation to India to affirm India–New Zealand relations. The New Zealand and Indian governments agreed to enter into free trade talks and signed a bilateral defence agreement. On 18 March, Foreign Minister Peters met with United States Secretary of State Marco Rubio to discuss various issues of concern to New Zealand–United States relations including defence, security and economic cooperation in the Pacific.

On 3 April, the Government's legislation repealing Section 7AA of the Oranga Tamariki Act 1989 passed its third reading, becoming law. While National, ACT and NZ First supported the bill, it was opposed by Labour, the Greens and Te Pāti Māori. In response to ten percent tariffs imposed by the second Trump Administration on New Zealand exports to the United States, Trade Minister Todd McClay disputed the tariff rate but confirmed that New Zealand would not impose retaliatory tariffs on US imports. On 5 April, Housing Minister Chris Bishop and Building and Construction Minister Chris Penk confirmed that the Government would amend the Building Act to deregulate the process for building "granny flats."

On 7 April, Defence Minister Collins confirmed that the Government would be investing NZ$12 billion over the next four years in the NZDF to boost defence spending to over 2 percent of GDP. On 8 April 2025, Climate Change Change Minister Simon Watts confirmed that the New Zealand Government would shut down its green investment bank New Zealand Green Investment Finance, citing poor performance. On 11 April, Veterans Minister Penk confirmed that the Government would be expanding the definition of military veteran to include 100,000 former soldiers, sailors and aviators, and would also create a new national veterans day. However, the Government would not be increasing eligibility for support entitlements under the Veteran Supports' Act. That same day, Foreign Minister Peters confirmed that visitors from the Pacific Islands Forum would be eligible for multiple entry visas from July 2025. In addition, the Government would trial a one-year visa programme allowing Pacific passport holders with an Australian temporary visa to visit New Zealand for up to three months.

On 13 April, Transport Minister Bishop confirmed that the Government was proposing to remove the requirement for a second practical driving test and to reduce the number of eyesight tests required. On 14 April, Tourism Minister Louise Upston confirmed that the Government would invest NZ$13.5 million in Tourism New Zealand to attract international tourism. On 16 April, Health Minister Brown announced the Government's "Health Infrastructure Plan," which seeks to invest NZ$20 billion in upgrading the country's health infrastructure.

On 22 April, Luxon confirmed that New Zealand would be extending its deployment of 100 military personnel in the United Kingdom to training Ukrainian military forces until December 2026. In addition, New Zealand would continue providing intelligence, liaison and logistics support for the Ukrainian military.

On 28 April, Education Minister Stanford announced the Government would invest $53 million in covering teachers' registration and practising certificate fees as part of an effort to help the teaching sector over the next three years. On 29 April, Finance Minister Willis confirmed that the Government would reduce its operation allowance from NZ$2.4 billion to NZ$1.3 billion for the 2025 New Zealand budget. The budget would focus on health, education, law and order, defence, with some limited spending on critical "social investments," boosting business growth and cost of living relief.

On 30 April, Stanford and Willis confirmed that the Government would be introducing financial literacy into the primary school curriculum from 2027. That same day, Justice Minister Goldsmith announced that the Government would introduce legislation to reinstate a blanket ban on prisoners voting, describing it as a reversal of the previous Labour Government's "soft on crime" policy.

On 4 May, Stanford launched the Government's new "Parent Portal," an online tool designed to provide parents with information about the school curriculum. That same day, Defence Minister Collins confirmed that the Government would allocate NZ$2 billion from its NZ$12 billion four-year defence budget to purchasing new maritime helicopters for the Royal New Zealand Navy.

On 6 May, National MP Catherine Wedd introduced a member's bill that would force social media platforms to restrict access to users under the age of 16 years. Since National's coalition partner ACT had refused to support the bill, Luxon confirmed that National would be seeking cross-party support for the legislation. On 7 May, Luxon and Tourism Minister Louise Upston announced the Government would end the requirement for overseas visitors to provide certified translations of supporting documents in a bid to boost tourism. That same day, the Government passed the Equal Pay Amendment Act 2025 under urgency, raising the threshold for making pay equity claims. As a result, 33 claims representing thousands of workers have to be dropped and refiled.

On 9 May, the Government allocated NZ$774 million from the 2025 budget towards the care system and improving redress for survivors of abuse in state care and faith-based institutions. The Government declined a Royal Commission report to establish an independent redress entity. That same day, Māori Development Minister Potaka announced that an "independent technical advisory group" would review the Treaty of Waitangi Act 1975, which governs the scope of the Waitangi Tribunal. The Government had committed to reviewing the scope of the Waitangi Tribunal as part of its coalition agreements with ACT and NZ First. On 10 May, Customs Minister Casey Costello announced that the Government would invest NZ$35 million from the 2025 budget into combating drug smuggling, improving supply chain security and expanding the New Zealand Customs Service's overseas presence.

On 15 May, the Government apologised to the Māori iwi Ngāti Ranginui for land confiscations and a scorched earth campaign during the New Zealand Wars. The New Zealand Parliament passed legislation compensating the tribe NZ$38 million and designating 15 sites of historical significance to the tribe. That same day, Willis announced that the Government would invest NZ$190 million in a social investment fund, as part of a wider NZ$275 million budgetary allocation to the Social Investment Agency. On 16 May, Willis announced that the Government would allocate NZ$577 million from the 2025 budget to the New Zealand film industry. On 18 May, Health Minister Brown announced that Government would allocate NZ$164 million from the 2025 budget to expanding urgent and after-hours healthcare services in Dunedin, Counties Manukau, Whangārei, Palmerston North and Tauranga over the next four years.

On 22 May, Willis released the 2025 New Zealand budget. On 31 May, David Seymour succeeded Winston Peters as deputy prime minister, under the terms of the coalition agreement in 2023. He became the first ACT deputy prime minister.

On 8 June, Immigration Minister Stanford announced the "Parent Boost" visa, which would allow the parents of migrants to live in New Zealand for between five and ten years if they met certain health, character and financial criteria. On 15 June, Stanford and Luxon announced a three-month visa waiver trial for Chinese citizens with valid Australian visitor, work, family or student visas would commence in November 2025. On 18 June, Stanford followed up with an announcement that Chinese nationals would no longer need to apply for transit visas from November 2025.

On 11 June, Peters announced that New Zealand would join the United Kingdom, Norway, Canada and Australia imposing travel bans on Israeli National Security Minister Itamar Ben-Gvir and Finance Minister Bezalel Smotrich for allegedly inciting "extremist violence" against Palestinians in the West Bank.

On 15 June, Associate Housing Minister Tama Potaka announced that the Ministry of Housing and Urban Development would be collaborating with the Rotorua Lakes Council and community housing providers to build 189 homes (150 social homes and 39 affordable rentals) in Rotorua by mid-2027. He also confirmed that the Government planned to close down all remaining emergency housing motels in Rotorua by late 2025.

On 18 June, Statistics Minister Shane Reti announced that the Government would be scrapping the five-year census in favour of administrative data and annual randomised surveys. On 19 June, the Government confirmed it had suspended NZ$20 million of core sector support funding to the Cook Islands in early June 2025 in retaliation for the Cook Islands government signing a partnership agreement with China in February 2025 without consulting New Zealand, per the requirements of their free association relationship.

On 22 June, Collins and Peters announced that the Government would send a C-130J Super Hercules into the Middle East to evacuate New Zealanders in Iran and Israel. Peters confirmed there were about 80 New Zealanders registered in Iran and 101 in Israel. On 26 June, the Government passed legislation designating the Independent Children's Monitor as a stand-alone independent Crown entity, disestablishing the Children and Young People's Commission and reinstating the Children's Commissioner; effective 1 August 2025.

On 29 and 30 June, Goldsmith confirmed that the Government would introduce coward punching legislation and higher penalties for assaulting correctional officers and first responders as part of National's coalition agreement with New Zealand First. On 1 and 3 July, Goldsmith and Associate Justice Minister Nicole McKee announced that the Government would introduce legislation increasing penalties for shoplifting and trespassing.

On 14 July, Tertiary Education Minister Penny Simmonds confirmed that the Government would dissolve Te Pūkenga by late 2026 and restore the autonomous status of 10 polytechnics by 1 January 2026. Five polytechnics NorthTec, the Western Institute of Technology at Taranaki, Whitireia, the Wellington Institute of Technology and Tai Poutini Polytechnic would remain part of Te Pūkenga until the Government reached a decision about their financial viability in early 2026. In addition, The Open Polytechnic of New Zealand, Otago Polytechnic and the Universal College of Learning would become part of a new federation. Simmonds also said that the Government would establish a new system for industry work-based training.

On 16 July, Education Minister Stanford announced that the Government would be ending open-plan class rooms, which had been introduced in 2011 by the Fifth National Government. On 18 July, Stanford announced that the Government would create a new Crown agency called the New Zealand School Property Agency, which would be responsible for managing the building, maintenance and administration of the school property portfolio. That same day, Luxon launched a new Public Research Organisation called the New Zealand Institute for Advanced Technology, which will be responsible for boosting economic development through advanced technology such as artificial intelligence and quantum computing.

On 20 July, Economic Growth Minister Willis and Infrastructure Minister Bishop announced that the Government would invest NZ$6 billion on various infrastructure projects including roading and hospitals. On 21 July, Brown announced that the Government would contribute NZ$82.5 million to the establishment of the University of Waikato's medical school; with the university and private philanthropists contributing the remaining NZ$150 million endowment. On 31 July, Parliament passed legislation repealing a 2018 law passed by the previous Labour Government limiting new oil and gax exploration permits off the coast of Taranaki. The Crown Minerals Amendment Act 2025 was supported by the governing coalition parties but opposed by the Labour, Green parties and Te Pāti Māori.

On 4 August, Luxon and Stanford announced the Government would scrap the National Certificate of Educational Achievement (NCEA) school certificate system and replace it with three new school certificates over a five-year period. On 6 August, Cabinet allocated NZ$25 million for a referendum on four-year parliamentary terms to coincide with the 2026 general election. This would be the third referendum on four-year parliamentary terms, after the 1967 and 1990.

On 10 August, Stanford announced two new seasonal work visas: the Global Workforce Seasonal Visa for agricultural and horticultural workers, and the Peak Seasonal Visa for short-term agricultural and aquaculture workers. The Global Workforce Visa is valid for three years while the Peak Seasonal Visa is valid for seven months. On 13 August, Goldsmith announced that the Government would amend the Crimes Act 1961 to strengthen New Zealand's human trafficking and people smuggling laws. On 15 August, Goldsmith announced the Government would introduce legislation banning protests outside people's private homes. Labour leader Hipkins said his party was discussing whether to support the proposed law.

On 18 August, Building and Construction Minister Chris Penk announced that the Government would introduce legislation to overhaul the building consent system. Key changes include scrapping the current "joint and several liability" regime with a "proportional liability" system and streamlining the 67 existing local Building Consent Authorities. On 19 August, the Government passed two laws entrenching its Local Water Done Well programme. On 20 August, Cabinet agreed to draft legislation abolishing the greyhound racing industry in New Zealand. On 21 August, Defence Minister Collins and Foreign Minister Peters announced that the Government would purchase two Airbus A321XLR jets for the Royal New Zealand Air Force and five new MH-60R Seahawks for the Royal New Zealand Navy as part of its long-term investment in upgrading the New Zealand Defence Force's capabilities.

On 27 August, Economic Growth Minister Willis announced that the Government would amend the Fast-track Approvals Act 2024 to allow the entry of new supermarket competitors to break the country's supermarket duopoly. On 28 August, Associate Justice Minister Nicole McKee confirmed the Government would amend alcohol legislation to make it harder for people to block liquor licenses and to introduce one-off special trading hours for pubs and clubs screening major sport and cultural events.

On 1 September, Luxon confirmed the Government would seek to amend the Overseas Investment Amendment Act 2018 to allow investor visa holders to buy homes with a minimum value of NZ$5million. That same day, Regional Development Minister Jones confirmed that the Government would allocate NZ$30 million worth of loans to subsidising regional airlines.

On 3 September, Disabilities Issues Minister Louise Upston announced that the Government will reform the disability support system in three stages throughout 2026. These include introducing new assessments for disability support recipients from 1 February 2026, introducing a new budget for flexibility funding users from 1 April 2026, and reassessing existing applicants from 1 October 2026. On 4 September, Immigration Minister Stanford confirmed that the Government would amend the Immigration Act to make it easier to deport non-citizen criminals including raising the time limit from 10 years to 20 years, widening the deportation powers of immigration officers and raising penalties for migrant exploitation.

On 11 September, Stanford announced that the Government would introduce several new STEM–oriented subjects for Years 11 to 13 students from 2028. These new subjects include earth science, space science, statistics, data science, electronics, mechatronics, civics education, philosophy, media studies, Māori and Pasifika studies, and various industry-led subjects. She also confirmed that the indigenous Māori curriculum Te Marautanga o Aotearoa would be resourced with a new detailed curriculum and new subjects focusing on traditional Māori cosmology, wood carving and Māori culture.

On 22 September, Stanford announced that the Government would invest NZ$413 million into upgrading school infrastructure. On 23 September, the Government announced that it would introduce two new work residency pathways to address a national shortage of technical and skilled workers. In response, the NZ First coalition party invoked the "agree to disagree" clause of its coalition agreement with the National Party. On 24 September, Willis announced that Anna Breman, the deputy governor of the Swedish central bank Sveriges Riksbank, would become the first female Governor of the Reserve Bank of New Zealand. On 25 September, the Government reopened applications for oil and gas exploration in New Zealand. On 27 September, Peters confirmed during the 80th session of the United Nations General Assembly that New Zealand would not recognise Palestinian statehood on the grounds there was no "fully legitimate" state to recognise.

On 29 September, Building and Construction Minister Chris Penk announced a reform of the earthquake-prone building classification system. The Auckland, Northland Regions and Chatham Islands were removed from the new system due to their low seismic risk, reducing the amount of buildings nationwide being classed as earthquake-prone by 55%. On 1 October, Willis and Energy Minister Simon Watts announced that the Government would invest in the electrical generation sector and increase the enforcement powers of the Electricity Authority. The Government ruled out selling its shares in the electrical generation sector. On 3 October, Collins and associate defence Minister Penk launched the Government's Defence Industry Strategy, which seeks to encourage New Zealand companies to export "lethal weapons" to the international market. On 5 October, Luxon and Upston announced that the Government would tighten welfare eligibility criteria for 18 and 19-year old teenagers; with those having parents earning over NZ$65,000 being ineligible for Jobseeker and other emergency benefits from November 2026.

On 11 October, the 2025 New Zealand local referendums on Māori wards and constituencies was held. The final results of the referendums were 24 councils voted to remove them and 18 councils voted to keep them. On 14 October, Parliament passed legislation allowing radio and television stations to broadcast advertisements on Christmas Day, Good Friday, Easter Sunday and Anzac Day. The legislation was supported by the National, Labour and ACT parties but was opposed by the Greens, New Zealand First and Te Pāti Māori. On 22 October, Parliament passed the government's legislation limiting the threshold for Māori foreshore and seabed claims. While the government coalition supported the bill, opposition parties vowed to repeal the legislation if they formed the next government.

On 13 November, Deputy Prime Minister and ACT leader Seymour's contentious Regulatory Standards Bill passed its third reading in Parliament along partisan lines, becoming law. On 20 November, NZ First leader and Foreign Minister Peters vowed to repeal the legislation if re-elected in 2026, stating that the party had opposed the Regulatory Standards Bill but had reluctantly supported it due to ACT's coalition agreement with National. In response, Seymour accused Peters of seeking to form a coalition with the opposition Labour Party.

On 19 November, Health Minister Simeon Brown, announced a ban on puberty blockers for minors with gender dysphoria set to take effect on December 19, 2025. Minors with gender dysphoria already on puberty blockers will be able to continue them and the drug will also remain available for other uses like early onset puberty. Brown cited the Cass Review in his decision and said the ban will remain in place until the completion of the United Kingdom's clinical trial on puberty blockers. The ban was welcomed by National's NZ First and ACT coalition partners, but was condemned by the opposition Labour and Green parties.

On 25 November 2025, Local Government Minister Simon Watts and RMA Reform Minister Chris Bishop confirmed the Government would introduce legislation in 2026 to abolish regional councils and transfer their responsibilities to the 67 local district and city councils. The coalition government has proposed replacing elected regional councillors with "Combined Territories Boards" consisting of the mayors of these constituent districts or alternatively reorganising the districts into unitary entities.

On 9 December, Bishop announced that the Government would introduce two new bills to replace the Resource Management Act 1991. These proposed laws consist of a Planning Bill outlining how land can be used and developed including for housing growth and a Natural Environment Bill outlining the rules for managing the usage of natural resources and environmental protection. These two laws are expected to pass into law in late 2026 and come into effect in 2029. These two bills passed their first readings on 16 December with the support of the governing coalition parties and the opposition Labour Party.

On 10 December, the Government launched new mobile app called "Govt.nz". On 16 December, the Government slashed transport subsidies for elderly and disabled people from 75% to 65%. That same day, the Government announced plans to create a new mega ministry called the Ministry for Cities, Environment, Regions and Transport (MCERT).

On 17 December, Government agreed to return 3,068 hectares in the upper South Island, including the Kaiteriteri Recreation Reserve and the Abel Tasman Coast Track, plus a $420 million compensation, to Te Tau Ihu Māori as part of the Nelson Tenths settlement. That same day, Parliament passed the Government's new electoral amendment legislation tightening the timeframe for voter registration, banning prisoners from voting, and allowing larger anonymous political donations.

=== 2026 ===
On 19 January, Foreign Minister Winston Peters and Kiribati Vice-president Teuea Toatu signed a statement in Tarawa renewing New Zealand's aid assistance to Kiribati in the areas of health, labour mobility and security. In response to the January 2026 New Zealand storms, Luxon on 27 January announced that the Government would provide a NZ$2.2 million relief package to flood-hit regions including NZ$1.2 million to mayoral relief funds and $1 million to marae that had provided welfare support to displaced communities.

On 29 January, the National and Labour parties agreed to co-sponsor new legislation targeting modern slavery. National's coalition partner, ACT, had opposed the introduction of the modern slavery bill. That same day, Parliament passed legislation formalising the Crown's Treaty of Waitangi settlement with Ngāti Hāua, which includes NZ$19 million worth of financial redress and the return of 64 culturally-significant sites. On 30 January, Luxon and Peters confirmed that New Zealand would not join US President Donald Trump's Board of Peace, which aims to oversee the reconstruction of Gaza.

On 2 February, Luxon and Stanford launched a new five-point student student achievement grading system focusing on reading, writing and mathematics. On 3 February, Bishop confirms that the Government would amend the driving licensing system to replace the full driving test with trial periods for restricted drivers and lowering licensing fees; effective from 27 January 2027. On 9 February, Climate Change Minister Watts announced that the Government would build a new liquefied natural gas import facility in Taranaki, which would be funded by a levy on electricity of between $2 and $4/MWh. On 11 February, Willis announced that the Government would review the Reserve Bank of New Zealand's decisions during the COVID-19 pandemic to lower the Official Cash Rate to 0.25 and inject NZ$55 million worth of digital money into the New Zealand economy.

On 17 February 2026, Infrastructure Minister Bishop released the country's first "National Infrastructure Plan," which detailed 16 recommendations and 10 priorities for the next decade. He said that the Government would be seeking cross-party support for the plan. By 16 June 2026, the National Infrastructure Plan had won the support of the opposition Labour and Green parties. The Government agreed to implement 13 of the 16 recommendations and four further actions including reviewing the land transport funding system, introducing legislation requiring government departments and Crown entities to develop long-term investment and asset management plans, requiring infrastructure provides to maintain updated data in the National Infrastructure Network and developing a professional standard for public sector leadership.

On 17 February, Parliament passed the Government's controversial Employment Relations Amendment Act 2026 which tightened the criteria for personal grievances claims, created a "gateway test" for differentiating between employees and contractors, ended payouts for employees dismissed for "serious misconduct," and eliminated a 30-day rule extending automatic collective agreement terms to new employees. On 18 February, the Government scrapped plans to hold a referendum on extending the parliamentary term from three to four years at the 2026 New Zealand general election. While Goldsmith said that legislation extending the parliamentary term would not progress to its second reading during the 54th New Zealand Parliamentary term, he said that Parliament could progress the legislation in future terms.

On 22 February, Goldsmith and Mitchell announced that the Government would amend the Summary Offences Act 1981 to give Police new dispersal powers targeting rough sleepers and people displaying disorderly behaviour. On 25 February 2026, Bishop announced that the Government was seeking consultation on several proposed changes to road rules including allowing children under the age of 12 years to ride their bikes on footpaths, allowing e-scooters to ride on bike paths, requiring drivers travelling under 60 km/h to give way to buses pulling out of stop zones, and easing restrictions on heavy vehicles.

Following the outbreak of the 2026 Iran war which began on 28 February, Luxon and Peters issued a joint statement defending the strikes as a response to Iranian "threats to international peace and security" and called for a resumption of negotiations and adherence to international law.

On 10 March, Associate Agricultural Minister Andrew Hoggard confirmed that the Government would not progress with an ACT and National pledge to reverse the previous government's ban on live animal exports during the 54th New Zealand Parliamentary term, stating that he had been unable to secure consensus within the New Zealand Cabinet. He said that the Government would instead focus on implementing its reforms to the Resource Management Act 1991. While the Greens' animal welfare spokesperson Steve Abel welcomed the retention of the live animal export ban, Federated Farmers' dairy chair Karl Dean expressed disappointment and said that it hurt New Zealand's agricultural exports.

Between 15 and 18 March 2026, Luxon led a parliamentary delegation to Samoa and Tonga to reaffirm bilateral relations. During the trip, the Government signed police, customs and aid agreements with their Samoan and Tongan counterparts. On 17 March, Health Minister Brown announced that the Government would invest an extra NZ$25 million to boost hospital capacity and staffing ahead of the winter months.

On 24 March, Luxon and Willis announced that the Government would grant a $50 in-work tax credit to 143,000 working families with children to help with rising fuel costs from 7 April. Another 14,000 families will also be eligible for a lower tax credit. While beneficiaries and pensioners are ineligible for the tax credit, their payments would be adjusted from 1 April per procedure. The tax relief package is expected to cost NZ$373 million if it lasts a full year and will be funded from the Government's operational allowance for the 2026 New Zealand budget. While the opposition Labour and Green parties criticised the tax credits as insufficient for helping beneficiaries, carers, retirees and encouraging public transportation, the allied NZ First and ACT parties welcomed the tax credits as "sensible and proportionate." The Government has ruled out reducing road user chargers for diesel users. On 2 April, Health Minister Brown announced that the Government would increase fuel subsidies for home and community support workers by 30% from 63.5 cents to 82.5 cents per km in response to rising fuel costs. Brown said that the fuel subsidy would last for at least 12 months or until the price of 91 octane petrol fell below $3 per litre for four consecutive weeks. On 2 April 2026, associate energy minister Shane Jones confirmed the Government would invest over $20 million in recommissioning diesel storage tanks at Marsden Point to help address the global fuel shortage.

On 7 April, associate regional development minister Mark Patterson announced that the Government would allocate a NZ$18.13 million loan from the Regional Infrastructure Fund to support the construction of dam in Tukituki with the goal of boosting agricultural and horticultural production in the Hawke's Bay region.

In April 2026, it was reported by The New Zealand Herald and The Spinoff that Stuart Smith had been "ghosted" by Prime Minister Christopher Luxon. As Senior Whip, Smith reportedly attempted to alert Luxon to "flagging caucus support" during a parliamentary sitting week, but the Prime Minister allegedly remained unreachable, forcing Smith to relay the warning to Deputy Leader Nicola Willis instead. Critics described this as a deliberate attempt to avoid a formal notification that could trigger a leadership challenge. At a press conference in Pōkeno on 17 April 2026, Luxon denied the reports, stating he had not been approached by Smith regarding his leadership and that he remained confident in his position. On 21 April, Luxon survived an internal National caucus confidence vote on his leadership.

On 27 April 2026, Trade and Investment Minister Todd McClay signed the New Zealand–India Free Trade Agreement with the Indian Commerce and Industry Minister Piyush Goyal in New Delhi. While New Zealand First had opposed the agreement due to its dairy and immigration provisions, the opposition Labour Party decided to support the free trade agreement; giving the National and ACT parties the numbers to enact the bill into law.

On 4 May, Luxon and Singaporean Prime Minister Lawrence Wong signed a bilateral "fuel for food" agreement to ensure a steady supply of essential goods in response to the ongoing Iran war. On 5 May, Local Government Minister Watts and RMA Reform Minister Bishop issued local councils with a three-months timeframe to develop amalgamation plans. On 6 May, Media and Communications Minister Goldsmith confirmed that the Government would disestablish the broadcasting regulator, the Broadcasting Standards Authority. That same day, the Internal Affairs Minister Brooke van Velden announced that the Government would introduce a citizenship test focusing on the Bill of Rights, voting rights and government structure for prospective New Zealand citizens from mid-2027.

On 8 May, Peters and Willis separately confirmed that the Fees Free scheme for final year university students would be scrapped in the 2026 New Zealand budget. On 15 May, Seymour announced that the Government would invest NZ$212 million to continuing the Healthy School Lunches programme for the 2027 school year but would seek to make changes for the 2028 school year.

On 16 May, Luxon and Stanford announced further changes to the Government's National Certificate of Educational Achievement replacement, including making science compulsory for Year 11 students, mandating exams across all subjects, and replacing aggregate credits with a score count of subjects and grades. On 18 May, Luxon and Stanford announced the Government would allocate $131 million from the 2026 New Zealand budget into boosting literacy and mathematics for primary and intermediate children. On 19 May, Willis announced that the Government would seek to lay off 8,700 public sector jobs and merge several government departments by mid-2029 as part of a plan to deliver NZ$2.4 billion in savings. The Government intends to replace back office roles with artificial intelligence.

On 27 May, Education Minister Stanford abandoned plans to legislate new restrictions to homeschooling in New Zealand following broad opposition from homeschooling parents, National's ACT and NZ First coalition partners and opposition parties. That same day, Parliament passed the Government's legislation disestablishing the Ministry for the Environment and transferring its statutory functions to MCERT, effective 1 July. On 28 May, Willis released the 2026 New Zealand budget. On 29 May, Parliament passed the Government's urgent legislation allowing the Ministry of Social Development to use artificial intelligence to make decisions regarding people's welfare benefits.

On 1 June, the Government raised English language requirements for work visa holders while lowering visa requirements for investor visa holders. In mid June, New Zealand joined the United States in voting against the International Labour Organization's decision to adopt binding employment standards for gig workers working in sectors such as ride-hailing and food delivery. Workplace Relations Minister van Velden cited concerns that the ILO's employment standards could contravene New Zealand's employment legislation. On 24 June, Associate Immigration Minister Casey Costello confirmed that the Community Organisation Refugee Sponsorship scheme would be made permanent and expanded from 2027.

On 1 July, Parliament passed the Government's controversial legislation reversing several 2015 workplace safety legislative changes that were passed following the 2010 Pike River Mine disaster. On 28 July, Immigration Minister Stanford announced that the Government would amend the Recognised Seasonal Employer scheme to "simplify" the process and protect seasonal workers. That same day, Parliament passed legislation replacing the Arms Act 1983 as the regulatory framework for firearms in New Zealand.

On 29 July, the Government granted a 12-year petroleum exploration permit to Australian company EnZed Energy; the first exploration permit since the reversal of the 2018 ban on oil and gas exploration by the previous Labour government. That same day, the Government agreed to accept "in some form" all 63 recommendations of the two inquiries of the Royal Commission of Inquiry into COVID-19 Lessons Learned. That same day, the Government decided not to proceed with calls to ban the public sale of fireworks. While NZ First supported legislation banning fireworks, ACT disagreed with the proposed ban. On 29 July, Parliament passed new employment leave legislation basing employees' annual and sick leave in direct proportion to their standard work hours and the Arms Act 2026, which replaced the Arms Act 1983 as the main firearms law.

On 30 July, Parliament passed the English Language Act 2026, which designated the English language as one of New Zealand's three official languages. On 6 August, Parliament passed legislation amending the Crimes Act 1961 by creating new offences for assaulting first responders and coward punching, raised penalties for shoplifting and human trafficking, and expanded citizen's arrest powers. On 12 August, Luxon survived a second confidence vote, which resulted in Defence Minister Chris Penk being stripped of all his ministerial portfolios. On 18 August, Parliament passed the Government's controversial legislation preventing lawsuits against companies for climate changing-emissions under tort law.

On 24 August, the National Party introduced legislation into Parliament to ban people under the age of 16 from accessing most social media platforms. The allied ACT and New Zealand First opposed the proposed law, invoking their agree to disagree provisions in their coalition agreements with National. The following day, the opposition Labour Party expressed support for the Government's Online Safety (Minimum Age and Child Safety Risk Assessment) Bill. The bill's first reading is expected to take place following the 2026 general election.

On 3 September, Parliament passed the Government's legislation tightening the welfare benefits criteria for teenagers aged 18 and 19-years old based on a parental income test. On 16 September, Parliament passed legislation directing local government bodies to focus on delivering core services, restricting council voting to elected members and providing some relief from the impact of fast-track projects. On 17 September, Parliament passed the Government's legislation implementing the New Zealand–India Free Trade Agreement; with the opposition Labour Party backing National and ACT while NZ First joined the Greens and Te Pāti Māori in opposing the free trade agreement. That same day, Parliament passed the Government's legislation enabling the Youth Court of New Zealand to send youth offenders to Military Style Academies.

On 18 September, Parliament passed the Government's contentious legislation empowering Police to issue "move-on" orders to people aged 18 years above in order to combat homelessness, begging and disorderly behaviour. The following day, Parliament passed the Government's legislation easing earthquake building strengthening rules nationwide. On 22 September, Parliament passed the Government's Planning Act 2026 and the Natural Environment Act 2026, which will replace the Resource Management Act 1991 as the nation's main legislative framework for infrastructural and environment regulations. On 24 September, RMA Reform Minister Bishop and Local Government Minister Watts confirmed that the Government was pausing making decisions on local government reforms until after the 2026 New Zealand general election.

In mid October 2026, Foreign Minister Peters instructed New Zealand's Permanent Representative in the United Nations General Assembly to abstain from a non-binding vote in support of global pandemic prevention, preparedness and response; citing a need to test the resolution against a "national interest test." While Peters celebrated the abstention as a means of New Zealand exercising its sovereignty on health decision-making, associate health minister Matt Doocey, opposition Labour leader Chris Hipkins and former Prime Minister Helen Clark disagreed with the abstention, saying that it went against New Zealand's traditional support for international cooperation.

In early November 2026, the Government announced it would launch a one-year trial to restore Mainlander passenger rail services to Christchurch and establish more frequent train services between Christchurch, Dunedin and Invercargill.

Following the 2026 New Zealand general election held on 7 November, the government assumed caretaker protocols pending the release of final results on 27 November. Peters attended the East Asia Summit in Manila, the Philippines as caretaker Foreign Minister between 16 and 17 November while Luxon attended the Asia-Pacific Economic Forum (APEC) leaders' summit in Shenzhen, China between 18 and 19 November.

== Election results ==
The following table shows the total party votes and seats in Parliament won by National, plus any parties in coalition with the National-led government.

Election	Parliament	Government type	Party votes	Percentage	Total seats	Majority
2023	54th	National–ACT–NZ First coalition	1,505,877	52.81% National (38.08%); ACT (8.64%); NZ First (6.09%)	68	13

== Significant policies and initiatives ==
=== Agriculture ===
- Easing restrictions on gas and methane emissions from pastoral farming. (Note: pending implementation)
- Reverse the ban on live animal exports.
- Introduce legislation easing restrictions on genetic engineering.
- Reforming the membership, mandate and function of the National Animal Welfare Advisory Committee.
- Halting the review of the New Zealand Emissions Trading Scheme.
- Incentivising emissions reduction mitigations such as low methane genetics and animal feed.
- Encouraging government agencies to use woolen fibres at government buildings.

=== Constitutional ===
- Introduce legislation on a referendum to extend the parliamentary term to four years.

=== Education ===
- Shifting the "Fees Free Scheme" from the first year to final year of tertiary study. (came into effect Jan 1 2025)
- Eliminating all references to gender, sexuality and "relationship-based education guidelines" in educational curriculums.
- Requiring schools to institute one hour of reading, writing, and mathematics each day.
- Reintroducing charter schools and allowing state schools to convert to charter schools. (Note: implemented on 25 September 2024,)
- Restore balance to the school history curriculum.
- Combating truancy through enforcement action, data collection, and publishing school attendance data.
- Improve the cost-effectiveness of school lunch programmes.

=== Economic ===
- Narrow the Reserve Bank of New Zealand's mandate to managing price stability and inflation. (Note: implemented on 13 December 2023,)
- Expanding the Inland Revenue Department's tax audit capacity.
- Increase spending on wealth creation and infrastructure development.
- Reducing Core Crown expenditure as a proportion of the overall economy.
- Tax cuts will be funded by the reprioritisation of government expenditure and revenue gathering rather than a tax on foreign housing buyers.
- Strengthening the powers of the Grocery Commissioner and promoting competition in the supermarket sector.
- Prioritising fair trade agreements with export markets including India.
- Repeal the Clean Car Discount.

=== Employment and social services ===
- Repeal the Fair Pay Agreements regime by Christmas 2023. (Note: implemented on 14 December 2023,)
- Expand 90-day trials to include all businesses. (Note: implemented on 21 December 2023,)
- Commit to moderate increases in the minimum wage each year.
- Implementing sanctions against beneficiaries who can work but refuse to find work including electronic money management.
- Strengthening obligations on Jobseeker beneficiaries to find work including sanctions.
- Restricting the number of doctors who can issue medical certificates for health and disability limits.

=== Firearms ===
- Repealing the Arms Act 1983 and replacing it with the Arms Act 2026. (Note: Implemented on 29 July 2026.)
- Transferring the firearms regulator from the Police to a different agency. (Note: Implemented on 29 July 2026.)
- Reviewing and retaining the national Firearms Registry while easing some firearms licensing regulations. (Note: Implemented on 29 July 2026.)

=== Foreign affairs ===
- Ensure a "National Interest Test" is undertaken before New Zealand accepts any agreements from the UN and WHO that limit national decision-making and reconfirm that New Zealand's domestic law holds primacy over any international agreements, and by 1 December 2023 reserve against proposed amendments to WHO health regulations.
- Recognising Israel's right to self-defence in the Gaza war.
- Supporting a two-state solution to the Israeli–Palestinian conflict.
- Condemning Hamas for initiating the Gaza war and rejecting Hamas' role in any future governance of the Gaza Strip.
- Designating the whole of Hamas as a terrorist entity, after its military was described this way in 2010.
  - Designating both Hezbollah and the Houthis as terrorist entities.
- Introducing new legislation to criminalise covert and other subversive foreign interference activities.

=== Health ===
- Disestablish the Te Aka Whai Ora (Māori Health Authority). (Note: implemented on 28 February 2024,)
- Repeal the Smokefree Environments and Regulated Products (Smoked Tobacco) Amendment Act 2022. (Note: implemented on 28 February 2024,)
- Repeal the Therapeutic Products Act 2023.
- Review the University of Auckland's Māori and Pacific Admission Scheme and University of Otago equivalent.
- Allowing the sale of cold medication containing pseudoephedrine.
- End all remaining COVID-19 vaccine mandates.
- Establish an independent public inquiry into the handling of the COVID-19 pandemic in New Zealand.

=== Housing and tenancy ===
- Restoring interest deductibility for rental properties in various stages between 2023 and 2026 .
- Allowing local governments to opt out of the previous government's medium density residential standards.
- Restoring no-cause evictions with a 90-day notice. (Note: implemented on 12 December 2024,)
- Returning tenant's notice period to move back to 21 days.
- Returning landlord's notice period to sell property back to 42 days. (Note: implemented on 12 December 2024,)
- Introduce pet bonds for tenants. (Note: implemented on 12 December 2024,)

=== Immigration ===
- Raise the cap on the number of workers allowed under the Recognised Seasonal Employer scheme.
- Introduce a five-year, renewable parental category visa, conditional on covering health costs.
- Remove median wage requirements from Skilled Migrant Category visas.
- Make it easier for the family members of visa holders to immigrate to New Zealand.
- Improve the Accredited Employer Work Visa scheme to ensure that NZ is attracting migrants and skills needed.
- Toughening Immigration New Zealand's risk management and verification process.

=== Infrastructure, energy and natural resources ===
- Establishing a National Infrastructure Agency to coordinate government funding and private investment to boost infrastructural development.
- Establishing a NZ$1.2 billion Regional Infrastructure Fund.
- Ensure that climate change policies do not affect energy security.
- Amending the Resource Management Act 1991 to boost farming, housing, and other economic activities.
- Prioritise infrastructure needed to support New Zealand's heavy industry.
- Introducing new resource management legislation to emphasise property rights.
- Repealing the Natural and Built Environment Act 2023 and Spatial Planning Act 2023 by Christmas 2023. (Note: implemented on 23 December 2023)
- Repealing the previous Government's ban on offshore gas and oil exploration.
- Replacing the National Policy Statement for Freshwater Management 2020.
- Scrap the Kāinga Ora "Sustaining Tenancies Framework" and taking action against state housing tenants engaging in "anti-social behaviour."
- Reverse speed limit reductions where it is safe to do so.
- Progressing a business case to establish a dry dock at Marsden Point.

=== Justice and Law ===
- Abolishing concurrent sentencing when an offence is committed on parole, on bail or while in custody.
- Requiring prisoners to work.
- Equipping Corrections officers with body cameras.
- Introducing legislation dealing with "coward punching".
- Reintroducing three strikes. (Note: implemented on 13 December 2024,)
- Removing prisoner reduction targets.
- Training 500 new police officers within two years.
- Increase the number of Youth Aid officers.
- Boosting funding for community policing including Māori and Pasifika Wardens, Community Patrol New Zealand, and Neighbourhood Watch.
- Protect freedom of speech by ruling out the introduction of hate speech legislation and stop the Law Commission's work on hate speech legislation.
- Boosting funding to the Department of Correction to raise staffing levels.
- Amending the Sentencing Act 2002 and other legislation to ensure tougher consequences for criminals and to emphasise victims' rights.
- Introducing legislation to make it a specific offence to assault Police and other first responders.
- Boosting rehabilitation programmes for prisoners including driving licenses.
- Combating youth crime including consideration of a Youth Justice Demerit Point system.
- Toughen legislation against fleeing drivers.
- Introducing anti-stalking legislation with new restraining and harmful digital communications orders, and prison terms.
- Introducing legislation giving sexual abuse victims the power to decide whether convicted offenders should receive name suppression.

=== Māori issues and the Treaty of Waitangi ===
- Introducing the Treaty Principles Bill and support it to a Select Committee as soon as practicable.
- Enshrining Treaty Principles legislation into law.
- Amending Treaty of Waitangi legislation to "refocus the scope, purpose, and nature of its inquiries back to the original intent of that legislation."
- Removing all mentions of Treaty principles with "specific words relating to the relevance and application of the Treaty, or repealing the references."
- Halting all work related to the He Puapua report.
- Confirming that the United Nations Declaration on the Rights of Indigenous Peoples has no binding legal effect on New Zealand law.
- Restore the right to local referendum on the establishment or ongoing use of Māori wards. (Note: implemented on 30 July 2024,)
- Remove Section 7AA from the Oranga Tamariki Act 1989. (Note: implemented on 3 April 2025)
- Repeal the Canterbury Regional Council (Ngāi Tahu Representation) Act 2022.

=== Public sector ===
- Public sector organisations will be given "expenditure reduction targets" including reducing "non-essential" back office functions.
- Assessing government expenditure against the criteria of public goods, social insurance, regulating market failure and policy choice.
- Removing co-governance from the delivery of public services.
- Legislating the English language as an official language (English Language Act 2026). (Note: implemented on 30 July 2026,)
- Requiring all government departments to have their primary name in English and to communicate in English "except for those specifically related to Māori."
- Ensuring that government contracts are awarded based on value rather than race.
- De-establishing the Water Services Reform Programme and returning assets to local councils. (Note: implemented on 14 February 2024,)
- Creating a new independent monitoring agency for Oranga Tamariki (the Ministry for Children).
- Halting several workstreams including Auckland light rail, Let's Get Wellington Moving, and the Lake Onslow pumped hydro programme.

=== Regulation ===
- Creating a new regulatory agency (the Ministry for Regulation) to assess the quality of all new and existing legislation.
- Amend the Overseas Investment Act 2005 to limit ministerial decision making to national security concerns.
- Reducing regulatory barriers to promote competition.

=== Seniors ===
- Retaining the superannuation age at 65 years.
- Upgrade Super Gold Card and Veterans cards.
- Boost funding for dementia patients.
- Amending legislation and the resource consent process to make it easier to build "grannie flats."

== List of executive members ==
The Cabinet was announced on 24 November 2023 and consists of 19 members following the removal of Chris Penk as a member of Cabinet, 13 from the National Party, 3 from ACT and 3 from New Zealand First. Notable for being the first ever New Zealand government to have three parties in cabinet. A further five National MPs would sit outside of Cabinet, along with two ACT MPs and one NZ First MP.

In a first for New Zealand, the Deputy Prime Minister role will be split for the term, with Winston Peters holding the office until 31 May 2025. David Seymour will then take on the office until the conclusion of the term.

A cabinet reshuffle occurred on 24 April 2024. Luxon stripped Melissa Lee of her Media and Communications ministerial portfolio and Penny Simmonds of her Disability Issues portfolio. Lee had faced criticism for her response to Warner Bros. Discovery's closure of Newshub while Simmonds had faced criticism over her handling of changes to disability funding and services. Lee was also relieved of her Cabinet position. Paul Goldsmith assumed Lee's Media and Communications portfolio while Climate Change and Revenue Minister Simon Watts assumed her place in Luxon's cabinet. Social Development Minister Louise Upston assumed Simmonds' Disability Issues portfolio.

A second cabinet reshuffle occurred on 19 January 2025. Simeon Brown gained the health portfolio from Shane Reti and also became Minister for State Owned Enterprises. Reti became Minister of Science, Innovation and Technology and also gained the new Universities portfolio. Chris Bishop gained the transportation portfolio while Simon Watts gained the energy and local government portfolios. Melissa Lee lost her economic growth and ethnic communities ministerial portfolios to Nicola Willis and Mark Mitchell respectively. James Meager gained the hunting and fishing, youth, and the new South Island portfolios. Matt Doocey lost his ACC, tourism and youth portfolios to Andrew Bayly, Louise Upston and Meager respectively. Chris Penk assumed the small business and manufacturing portfolio. No changes were made to ACT and New Zealand First ministerial portfolios.

On 21 February 2025, Bayly resigned from his Commerce and Consumer Affairs and ACC portfolios following a complaint from a staff member about "overbearing" behaviour. His ministerial portfolios were assumed by National's Senior Whip Scott Simpson.

A third major cabinet reshuffle occurred on 2 April 2026 to address the planned departures of cabinet ministers Judith Collins and Shane Reti leading up to the 2026 New Zealand general election. Chris Penk joined Cabinet, gaining the defence, Government Communications Security Bureau (GCSB), New Zealand Security Intelligence Service (NZSIS) and space portfolios. Penny Simmonds rejoined Cabinet, gaining the tertiary education and science, innovation and technology portfolios. Chris Bishop became Attorney-General but lost the Leader of the House and campaign manager roles to Louise Upston and Simeon Brown respectively. Paul Goldsmith also gained the Public Service, Digitising Government, and Pacific Peoples portfolios. These changes came into effect on 7 April.

On 12 August 2026, Luxon stripped Penk of his ministerial portfolios after the latter launched an unsuccessful leadership challenge that triggered a confidence vote in the National Party caucus. Goldsmith assumed the defence, veterans, space, GCSB and NZSIS portfolios while Simon Watts assumed the building and construction portfolio.

=== Ministers ===
Portfolio	Minister	Party	Start	End
Prime Minister	Christopher Luxon	National	27 November 2023	Incumbent
Deputy Prime Minister	Winston Peters	NZ First	27 November 2023	31 May 2025
Deputy Prime Minister	David Seymour	ACT	31 May 2025	Incumbent
Leader of the House	Chris Bishop	National	27 November 2023	7 April 2026
Leader of the House	Louise Upston	National	7 April 2026	Incumbent
Deputy Leader of the House	Simeon Brown	National	27 November 2023	24 January 2025
Deputy Leader of the House	Louise Upston	National	24 January 2025	7 April 2026
Deputy Leader of the House	Scott Simpson	National	7 April 2026	Incumbent
Minister for ACC	Matt Doocey	National	27 November 2023	24 January 2025
Minister for ACC	Andrew Bayly	National	24 January 2025	24 February 2025
Minister for ACC	Scott Simpson	National	24 February 2025	Incumbent
Minister of Agriculture	Todd McClay	National	27 November 2023	Incumbent
Attorney-General	Judith Collins	National	27 November 2023	7 April 2026
Attorney-General	Chris Bishop	National	7 April 2026	Incumbent
Minister for Arts, Culture and Heritage	Paul Goldsmith	National	27 November 2023	Incumbent
Minister for Auckland	Simeon Brown	National	27 November 2023	7 April 2026
Minister for Auckland	Simon Watts	National	7 April 2026	Incumbent
Minister for Biosecurity	Andrew Hoggard	ACT	27 November 2023	Incumbent
Minister for Building and Construction	Chris Penk	National	27 November 2023	13 August 2026
Minister for Building and Construction	Simon Watts	National	13 August 2026	Incumbent
Minister for Child Poverty Reduction	Louise Upston	National	27 November 2023	Incumbent
Minister for Children	Karen Chhour	ACT	27 November 2023	Incumbent
Minister for Climate Change	Simon Watts	National	27 November 2023	Incumbent
Minister of Commerce and Consumer Affairs	Andrew Bayly	National	27 November 2023	24 February 2025
Minister of Commerce and Consumer Affairs	Scott Simpson	National	24 February 2025	7 April 2026
Minister of Commerce and Consumer Affairs	Cameron Brewer	National	7 April 2026	Incumbent
Minister for the Community and Voluntary Sector	Louise Upston	National	27 November 2023	Incumbent
Minister of Conservation	Tama Potaka	National	27 November 2023	Incumbent
Minister of Corrections	Mark Mitchell	National	27 November 2023	Incumbent
Minister for Courts	Nicole McKee	ACT	27 November 2023	Incumbent
Minister of Customs	Casey Costello	NZ First	27 November 2023	Incumbent
Minister of Defence	Judith Collins	National	27 November 2023	7 April 2026
Minister of Defence	Chris Penk	National	7 April 2026	13 August 2026
Minister of Defence	Paul Goldsmith	National	13 August 2026	Incumbent
Minister for Disability Issues	Penny Simmonds	National	27 November 2023	24 April 2024
Minister for Disability Issues	Louise Upston	National	24 April 2024	Incumbent
Minister for Digitising Government	Judith Collins	National	27 November 2023	7 April 2026
Minister for Digitising Government	Paul Goldsmith	National	7 April 2026	Incumbent
Minister for Economic Growth	Melissa Lee	National	27 November 2023	24 January 2025
Minister for Economic Growth	Nicola Willis	National	24 January 2025	Incumbent
Minister of Education	Erica Stanford	National	27 November 2023	Incumbent
Minister for Emergency Management and Recovery	Mark Mitchell	National	27 November 2023	Incumbent
Minister for Energy	Simeon Brown	National	27 November 2023	24 January 2025
Minister for Energy	Simon Watts	National	24 January 2025	7 April 2026
Minister for Energy	Simeon Brown	National	7 April 2026	Incumbent
Minister for the Environment	Penny Simmonds	National	27 November 2023	7 April 2026
Minister for the Environment	Nicola Grigg	National	7 April 2026	Incumbent
Minister for Ethnic Communities	Melissa Lee	National	27 November 2023	24 January 2025
Minister for Ethnic Communities	Mark Mitchell	National	24 January 2025	Incumbent
Minister of Finance	Nicola Willis	National	27 November 2023	Incumbent
Minister for Food Safety	Andrew Hoggard	ACT	27 November 2023	Incumbent
Minister of Foreign Affairs	Winston Peters	NZ First	27 November 2023	Incumbent
Minister of Forestry	Todd McClay	National	27 November 2023	Incumbent
Minister Responsible for the GCSB	Judith Collins	National	27 November 2023	7 April 2026
Minister Responsible for the GCSB	Chris Penk	National	7 April 2026	13 August 2026
Minister Responsible for the GCSB	Paul Goldsmith	National	13 August 2026	Incumbent
Lead Coordination Minister for the Government's; Response to the Royal Commission's Report into Historical Abuse in State Care and in the Care of Faith-based Institutions	Erica Stanford	National	26 January 2024	Incumbent
Minister of Health	Shane Reti	National	27 November 2023	24 January 2025
Minister of Health	Simeon Brown	National	24 January 2025	Incumbent
Minister of Housing	Chris Bishop	National	27 November 2023	Incumbent
Minister for Hunting and Fishing	Todd McClay	National	27 November 2023	24 January 2025
Minister for Hunting and Fishing	James Meager	National	24 January 2025	Incumbent
Minister of Immigration	Erica Stanford	National	27 November 2023	Incumbent
Minister of Infrastructure	Chris Bishop	National	27 November 2023	Incumbent
Minister of Internal Affairs	Brooke van Velden	ACT	27 November 2023	Incumbent
Minister of Justice	Paul Goldsmith	National	27 November 2023	Incumbent
Minister for Land Information	Chris Penk	National	27 November 2023	7 April 2026
Minister for Land Information	Mike Butterick	National	7 April 2026	Incumbent
Minister of Local Government	Simeon Brown	National	27 November 2023	24 January 2025
Minister of Local Government	Simon Watts	National	24 January 2025	Incumbent
Minister for Māori-Crown Relations: Te Arawhiti	Tama Potaka	National	27 November 2023	Incumbent
Minister for Māori Development	Tama Potaka	National	27 November 2023	Incumbent
Minister for Media and Communications	Melissa Lee	National	27 November 2023	24 April 2024
Minister for Media and Communications	Paul Goldsmith	National	24 April 2024	Incumbent
Minister for Mental Health	Matt Doocey	National	27 November 2023	Incumbent
Minister Responsible for Ministerial Services	Christopher Luxon	National	27 November 2023	Incumbent
Minister of National Security and Intelligence	Christopher Luxon	National	27 November 2023	Incumbent
Minister Responsible for the NZSIS	Judith Collins	National	27 November 2023	7 April 2026
Minister Responsible for the NZSIS	Chris Penk	National	7 April 2026	13 August 2026
Minister Responsible for the NZSIS	Paul Goldsmith	National	13 August 2026	Incumbent
Minister for Oceans and Fisheries	Shane Jones	NZ First	27 November 2023	Incumbent
Minister for Pacific Peoples	Shane Reti	National	27 November 2023	7 April 2026
Minister for Pacific Peoples	Paul Goldsmith	National	7 April 2026	Incumbent
Minister of Police	Mark Mitchell	National	27 November 2023	Incumbent
Minister for the Prevention of Family and Sexual Violence	Karen Chhour	ACT	27 November 2023	Incumbent
Minister for the Public Service	Nicola Willis	National	27 November 2023	7 April 2026
Minister for the Public Service	Paul Goldsmith	National	7 April 2026	Incumbent
Minister for Racing	Winston Peters	NZ First	27 November 2023	Incumbent
Minister for Rail	Winston Peters	NZ First	11 December 2024	Incumbent
Minister for Regional Development	Shane Jones	NZ First	27 November 2023	Incumbent
Minister for Regulation	David Seymour	ACT	27 November 2023	Incumbent
Minister for Resources	Shane Jones	NZ First	27 November 2023	Incumbent
Minister of Revenue	Simon Watts	National	27 November 2023	Incumbent
Minister Responsible for RMA Reform	Chris Bishop	National	27 November 2023	Incumbent
Minister for Rural Communities	Mark Patterson	NZ First	27 November 2023	Incumbent
Minister of Science, Innovation and Technology	Judith Collins	National	27 November 2023	24 January 2025
Minister of Science, Innovation and Technology	Shane Reti	National	24 January 2025	7 April 2026
Minister of Science, Innovation and Technology	Penny Simmonds	National	7 April 2026	Incumbent
Minister for Seniors	Casey Costello	NZ First	27 November 2023	Incumbent
Minister for Small Business and Manufacturing	Andrew Bayly	National	27 November 2023	24 January 2025
Minister for Small Business and Manufacturing	Chris Penk	National	24 January 2025	7 April 2026
Minister for Small Business and Manufacturing	Cameron Brewer	National	7 April 2026	Incumbent
Minister for Social Development and Employment	Louise Upston	National	27 November 2023	Incumbent
Minister for Social Investment	Nicola Willis	National	27 November 2023	Incumbent
Minister for the South Island	James Meager	National	24 January 2025	Incumbent
Minister for Space	Judith Collins	National	27 November 2023	7 April 2026
Minister for Space	Chris Penk	National	7 April 2026	13 August 2026
Minister for Space	Paul Goldsmith	National	13 August 2026	Incumbent
Minister for Sport and Recreation	Chris Bishop	National	27 November 2023	24 January 2025
Minister for Sport and Recreation	Mark Mitchell	National	24 January 2025	Incumbent
Minister of State Owned Enterprises	Paul Goldsmith	National	27 November 2023	24 January 2025
Minister of State Owned Enterprises	Simeon Brown	National	24 January 2025	Incumbent
Minister of Statistics	Andrew Bayly	National	27 November 2023	24 January 2025
Minister of Statistics	Shane Reti	National	24 January 2025	7 April 2026
Minister of Statistics	Scott Simpson	National	7 April 2026	Incumbent
Minister for Treaty of Waitangi Negotiations	Paul Goldsmith	National	27 November 2023	Incumbent
Minister for Tertiary Education and Skills	Penny Simmonds	National	27 November 2023	24 January 2025
Minister for Tertiary Education and Skills	Penny Simmonds	National	7 April 2026	Incumbent
Minister of Tourism and Hospitality	Matt Doocey	National	27 November 2023	24 January 2025
Minister of Tourism and Hospitality	Louise Upston	National	24 January 2025	Incumbent
Minister of Trade and Investment	Todd McClay	National	27 November 2023	Incumbent
Minister of Transport	Simeon Brown	National	27 November 2023	24 January 2025
Minister of Transport	Chris Bishop	National	24 January 2025	Incumbent
Minister for Universities	Shane Reti	National	24 January 2025	7 April 2026
Minister for Veterans	Chris Penk	National	27 November 2023	13 August 2026
Minister for Veterans	Paul Goldsmith	National	13 August 2026	Incumbent
Minister for Vocational Education	Penny Simmonds	National	24 January 2025	7 April 2026
Minister for Whānau Ora	Tama Potaka	National	27 November 2023	Incumbent
Minister for Women	Nicola Grigg	National	27 November 2023	Incumbent
Minister for Workplace Relations and Safety	Brooke van Velden	ACT	27 November 2023	Incumbent
Minister for Youth	Matt Doocey	National	27 November 2023	24 January 2025
Minister for Youth	James Meager	National	24 January 2025	Incumbent

=== Under-Secretaries and Private Secretaries ===
Ministry	Member of Parliament	Role	Party	Start	End
Infrastructure	Simon Court	Under-Secretary	ACT	27 November 2023	Incumbent
RMA Reform	Simon Court	Under-Secretary	ACT	27 November 2023	Incumbent
Media and Communications	Jenny Marcroft	Under-Secretary	NZ First	27 November 2023	Incumbent
Oceans and Fisheries	Jenny Marcroft	Under-Secretary	NZ First	26 January 2024	Incumbent

== Issues and controversies ==
=== Education curriculum changes ===
In 2026, former Ministry of Education official Claire Coleman, several principals and teachers' associations voiced opposition to the Government's proposed overhaul of the education curriculum across several subjects including physical education, music, technology, the arts, science and social sciences. Key grievances included an emphasis on standardised testing, a short timeframe, content overload, insufficient support, and the reduced influence of the Treaty of Waitangi. In response to criticism from educators, the Education Minister Erica Stanford said the Government had started an "ambitious reform programme which has prioritised delivery and achievement." She disputed claims of insufficient resourcing, saying that the Government had investing in school resources, teacher development, and provided teachers with a curriculum change allowance following negotiations with the New Zealand Educational Institute.

=== Electoral law changes ===
On 24 July 2025, Justice Minister Goldsmith announced that the Government would introduce new electoral amendment legislation. Key provisions include closing voter enrolment 13 days before election day, setting a 12-day advance voting period, automatic enrolment updates, removing the postal requirements for enrolment. The Government also intends to ban free food, drink or entertainment within 100 metres of a voting place (subject to a NZ$10,000 fine). In addition, the Government will ban all prisoners from voting. The Government also intends to raise the donation threshold from NZ$5,000 to NZ$6,000. In response, Labour's justice spokesperson Duncan Webb criticised the Government for seeking to restrict the number of people able to exercise their democratic right to vote by scrapping election day enrolments. In late July 2025, Attorney-General Judith Collins expressed concern that banning enrolment in the 13 days leading up to election day could breach the New Zealand Bill of Rights Act 1990. Collins' report said that these proposed changes could adversely affect young people along with Māori, Pasifika and Asian voters.

On 29 July 2025, the Government's Electoral Amendment Bill passed its first reading along party lines and was referred to select committee. On 30 July, Labour MP Willie Jackson accused the Government of gerrymandering through its proposal to scrap voter registration 12 days before election day. On 17 December, the Electoral Amendment Bill passed its third reading and subsequently received royal assent.

=== Environmental and climate change policies ===
In 2024, Reuters reported that the National-led coalition government had reversed several environmental policies including lifting a ban on gas and oil exploration, delaying agricultural emission pricing by five years and encouraging mining in a bid to boost New Zealand's flailing economy and fulfill election promises. As part of its economic policies, the Government has also sought to boost mining and agricultural exports. In addition, national carrier Air New Zealand has dropped its 2030 emissions target due to delays in obtaining new aircraft and the high cost of environmentally-friendly fuel. The Climate Change Commission and the University of Otago Climate Change Research Network co-director Sara Walton have expressed concerns that the Government's reversal of environmental policies would undermine New Zealand's goals of reaching its 2030 and 2035 carbon emissions targets. Cindy Baxter, chair of environmental group Kiwis against Seabed Mining, has also expressed concerns about the resumption of seabed mining on the West Coast Region of the South Island.

In November 2024, New Zealand's ranking on the 20th Climate Change Performance Index dropped by seven places to 41. The report's authors wrote that New Zealand had "taken significant backwards steps in climate policy" due to the Government scrapping policies boosting public transportation and delaying pricing greenhouse emissions from farming. The report was produced by three climate non-governmental organisations Germanwatch, NewClimate Institute and Climate Action Network (CAN) with the help of local climate groups WWF New Zealand, Lawyers for Climate Action New Zealand and Oil Change International.

On 3 June 2025, 26 climate scientists including University of Oxford Professor Paul Behrens and Duke University professor Drew Schindel circulated a letter to Prime Minister Luxon objecting to the Government's plans to lower its methane target by between 24 and 47 percent by 2050. The agricultural lobby groups Federated Farmers and Beef + Lamb New Zealand had lobbied for the New Zealand Government to reduce its methane target. In response, Luxon rejected the letter and defended the government's climate mitigation policies. The Green Party accused the Government of joining the "climate denial bandwagon." On 10 June, two groups, Lawyers for Climate Action NZ and the Environmental Law Initiative, filed a judicial review against the Government at the Wellington High Court over what they regarded as its "dangerously inadequate" plan to reduce carbon emissions to net zero by 2050.

On 23 June 2025, the Government announced that New Zealand would be withdrawing its associate membership of the Beyond Oil & Gas Alliance (Boga), an alliance of countries and stakeholders formed at a 2021 United Nations climate summit to promote a transition away from fossil fuels at international summits. On 25 June, Minister of Climate Change Simon Watts justified the decision on the grounds that only a small number of countries were involved in Boga, stating "in the context of significance or implications, it doesn't have anything material for this Government." Watts also said that remaining in Boga was at odds with the Government's policy of reversing the previous Labour Government's ban on future oil and gas exploration. Greens co-leader Chlöe Swarbrick criticised the decision, saying that it would undermine New Zealand's international reputation and relationships.

On 12 October 2025, the Government confirm it would lower its 2050 methane emissions reduction target from between 24% and 27% to between 14% and 24%. Climate Change Minister Watts reiterated the Government's commitment to reducing New Zealand's methane emissions by 2050. The Government also confirmed it would conduct a legislative review of its biogenic methane targets for 2040 and would not tax agricultural methane emissions due to the threat of farm closures. While Federated Farmers president Wayne Langford welcomed the reduction of New Zealand's methane reduction targets, several scientists and environmentalists including Greenpeace New Zealand spokesperson Amanda Larsson, Massey University climate mitigation expert Ralph Sims, Lawyers for Climate Action and Earth Sciences New Zealand lead scientist Jocelyn Turnbull expressed concern that the policy changes would reverse New Zealand's efforts to mitigate climate change and prioritise profit over the environment.

On 18 November 2025, the NGO Climate Action Network awarded New Zealand the "Fossil of the Day" award at the 2025 United Nations Climate Change Conference to protest the Government's decision in mid-October to lower New Zealand's methane emissions reduction target. This marked the fourth time in five years that New Zealand had received the dud award. In 2023, CAN had previously awarded NZ the "Fossil of the Day" award to protest the Government's announcement that it would reverse the ban on new oil and gas exploration permits. New Zealand had also won the "Fossil" award in 2021 and 2022 due to the previous Labour Government's refusal to update New Zealand's emissions target and for obstructing the establishment of a compensation fund for poorer countries affected by climate-related extreme weather events respectively.

In early December 2025, RNZ and Newsroom reported that the Government had rejected all of the Climate Commission's recommendations to strengthen New Zealand's the 2050 targets for methane and carbon emissions in line with its previous policy of reducing the country's methane reduction target from 24 to 27% to 14 to 24%. The Commission had recommended raising the target for carbon dioxide and other long-lived gases from a 2050 net zero target to a 2050 net-negative target, including international shipping and aviation emissions in New Zealand's emissions reductions, and to keep lowering emissions after 2050.

On 16 March 2026, the Wellington High Court heard opening arguments from Lawyers for Climate Action and the Environmental Law Initiative in their joint case against Climate Minister Simon Watts. They argued that the Government's decision to cancel several climate policies without consultation following the 2023 general election was unlawful and criticised the current carbon emissions reduction plan for emphasising tree planting over reducing the amount of carbon emissions. The plaintiffs sought a High Court ruling invalidating the Government's reversal of the previous government's climate policies and the current carbon emissions plan. The case is expected to last for three days.

On 13 May 2026, Goldsmith announced that the Government would amend existing climate legislation to prevent companies from being sued over damages caused by greenhouse gas emissions. The law change will apply to current and future cases including iwi leader Mike Smith's 2024 lawsuit against dairy giant Fonterra and five other major emitters. Though Justice Ministry officials had advised the Government not to intervene in Smith's court case, the Government had decided to proceed with the law change in response to the "uncertainty in business confidence" caused by Smith's court case against these corporate emitters. In late May 2026, the Office of the Ombudsman confirmed that it was investigating a complaint by the Environmental Law Initiative (ELI) that the Prime Minister's office had withheld information about meetings, discussions and conversations around a case between Smith and several corporate carbon emitters. ELI had lodged the complaint after receiving insufficient information following a freedom of information request in March 2026.

In mid July 2026, the Climate Change Commission expressed concern that New Zealand would miss its 2050 climate reduction targets unless the Government made more efforts to reduce the country's agricultural and methane emissions over the next two years. The Commission also recommended switching to low-emissions technologies to reduce household energy bills. It also observed that New Zealand's climate pollution had reduced over time but expressed concern that the Government had reduced the country's agricultural emission targets.

In late September 2026, the Dutch environmentalist group Both ENDS filed a complaint against New Zealand through the European Commission's "Single Entry Point" mechanism for allegedly breaching the climate change provisions of the EU–NZ free trade agreement. Both ENDs contended that the NZ government had breached these provisions by lacking a credible plan to meet climate targets, weakening methane targets, removing agriculture from carbon pricing, overturning the gas and oil exploration ban, investing in gas and a planned LNG facility, and passing legislation preventing climate-related lawsuits against major emitters. The group's complaint was supported by several New Zealand groups and individuals including Greenpeace New Zealand, the Environmental Law Initiative, Mike Smith and University of Auckland law Professor Jane Kelsey. In response, Trade Minister Todd McClay defended the New Zealand government's climate change policies, saying it was "not for overseas countries, organisations or lobby groups to tell New Zealand how to meet its obligations". Similarly, Prime Minister Luxon contended that New Zealand was complying with its international and trade obligations.

On 10 November, the Climate Action Network awarded New Zealand with its fifth "Fossil of the Day" awards at the COP31 climate change conference for dismantling its own climate initiatives. The NGO cited the New Zealand Government's current shortfall in meeting its Pars Agreement pledge, Both ENDS' formal complaint that NZ had breached its the climate change provisions of its free trade agreement with the EU, and Government's legislation blocking legal action against climate polluters. In response, a spokesperson for caretaker Climate Change Minister Watts' reiterated his government's commitment towards transitioning to a "climate resilient economy," reinforcing Pacific leadership on climate ambition and climate resilience, and meeting New Zealand's climate targets.

=== Relationship with Māori ===
Several of the National-led coalition government's policies including a proposal to discontinue financial incentives for public servants to learn the Māori language, instructions for government departments to prioritise their English language names over their Māori names, a proposed Treaty Principles Bill, and the proposed dissolution of Te Aka Whai Ora (the Māori Health Authority) and the proposed repeal of the Smokefree Environments and Regulated Products (Smoked Tobacco) Amendment Act 2022 were controversial among the Māori community, who perceived them as hostile and harmful towards Māori language, culture, and well-being.

On 6 December 2023, the Public Service Association, the New Zealand Educational Institute and the Māori Language Commission voiced opposition to the Government's plans to review financial incentives for civil servants to learn Māori; a programme which dated back to the 1980s. The Government plan gained support from the New Zealand Taxpayers' Union. That same day, Māori King Tūheitia Paki issued a royal proclamation to hold a national hui (meeting) to promote Māori unity in January 2024. The hui was in response to the Kīngitanga movement's concerns that the Government's policies towards the Treaty of Waitangi could reverse "decades of hard fought justice."

On 12 December, a Tauranga-based iwi (tribe) Ngai Te Rangi Settlement Trust filed an urgent claim with the Waitangi Tribunal, claiming that the Government was breaching Article Two of the Treaty of Waitangi by plans to discontinue financial incentives for public servants to learn Māori and instructing government departments to give primacy to their English names. The plaintiffs also claimed that Government directives for Waka Kotahi (NZ Transport Agency) and Te Whatu Ora (Health NZ) to use their English names breached Article One of the Bill of Rights by suspending the operation of the Treaty.

On 14 December, Lady Tureiti Moxon and Janice Kuka filed a claim at the Waitangi Tribunal against the Government's plans to dissolve the Māori Health Authority, claiming that it breached the Treaty of Waitangi. On 18 December, the Government filed a memorandum of counsel opposing Moxon and Kuka's claim. The Government also admitted that it had no alternative plan to address poor Māori health outcomes and that it had not consulted Māori according to the principles of the Treaty of Waitangi. The Government also conceded its policy to dissolve Te Aka Whai Ora had been motivated by political expediency during the 2023 election campaign.

The Māori health organisation Hāpai Te Hauora and Health Coalition Aotearoa's co-chairwoman Professor Lisa Te Morenga also expressed concern that the proposed repeal of Smokefree legislation would have adverse health effects on New Zealanders including Māori.

On 23 December, Te Tāwharau o Ngāti Pūkenga, the post settlement body for the Ngāti Pūkenga iwi (tribe) filed an urgent claim at the Waitangi Tribunal challenging the Government's plans to repeal Section 7AA of the Oranga Tamariki Act 1989. Section 7AA required Oranga Tamariki (the Ministry for Children) to prioritise a Māori child's ancestry or whakapapa (genealogy) when making uplifting decisions. Minister for Children Karen Chhour had lobbied for the repeal of Section 7AA, arguing that the policy placed the Treaty of Waitangi and cultural needs over the well-being of at-risk Māori children.

On 10 January 2024, the Waikato-Tainui iwi filed a legal challenge at the Wellington High Court against the Government's plans to roll back the use of the Māori language in the public sector, claiming that it breached the Crown's 1995 Raupata treaty settlement. The iwi also plans to file a separate legal challenge against the Government's changes to the Resource Management Act 1991. In response to Waikato-Tainui's legal challenges, Minister for Treaty of Waitangi Negotiations Paul Goldsmith reaffirmed the Government's commitment to the Treaty of Waitangi.

On 19 January, a leaked paper from the Ministry of Justice described the Government's proposed legislation to define the principles of the Treaty of Waitangi as "highly contentious." The proposed Treaty Principles bill had three principles: that the New Zealand Government has the right to govern all New Zealanders; the New Zealand Government will honour all New Zealanders in the chieftainship of their land and all their property; and that all New Zealanders are equal under the law with the same rights and duties. The Ministry's paper expressed concerns that the proposed law would conflict with the rights and interests of Māori under the Treaty, that the Crown was trying to define Treaty principles without consulting with Māori, that the Bill breached international agreements such as the International Covenant on Economic, Social and Cultural Rights, and that it infringed on the Māori right to self determination.

The leak came on the eve of a national hui (meeting) organised by Māori King Tūheitia on 20 January to unify Māori and discuss the potential impact of the Government's Treaty policies. In response, Goldsmith confirmed that the Justice ministry would investigate the leak and described the document as a draft that had not yet been considered by Cabinet. In addition, ACT party leader David Seymour, who had promoted the legislation, accused the Ministry of being part of a bureaucracy that was "resistant to change." Te Pāti Māori co-leader Rawiri Waititi used the leak to rally opposition against the Government's proposed constitutional changes while co-leader Debbie Ngarewa-Packer accused Seymour of seeking to undermine Māori rights enshrined in the Treaty.

Prior to King Tūheitia's national hui, he met with Prime Minister Luxon and Minister for Māori Development Tama Potaka on 15 January to discuss several of the Government's policies including the proposed Treaty Principles legislation and plans to roll back the use of Māori language in the public service. Tūheitia affirmed his commitment to speak Māori regardless of Government policy and direction. The national hui was held at Tūrangawaewae Marae on 20 January and attended by 10,000 people. National MPs Potaka and Dan Bidois represented the government there. Potaka defended the Government, disputing allegations that its policies were motivated by White supremacy.

Following a long-standing tradition in New Zealand politics, several members of the National and New Zealand First parties including Luxon, Potaka, Winston Peters, Shane Jones, Casey Costello and Jenny Marcroft attended the special annual hui (meeting) at the Rātana Church's pā (village) near Whanganui. Breaking with tradition, the ACT party chose not to send a representative. Since the 1930s, the Rātana Church has maintained an alliance with the Labour Party, with the Te Tai Tonga seat being held by several Rātana candidates including Eruera Tirikatene, Adrian Rurawhe, and Soraya Peke-Mason. Kīngitanga and Waikato-Tainui representative Rāhui Papa warned the Government that Māori would "not sit idly" if the Government meddled with the Treaty of Waitangi and affirmed the primacy of the Māori language version of the document. Luxon affirmed the Government's commitment to honouring the Treaty and said that National would only support ACT's Treaty Principles Bill to select committee level; which was questioned by Rātana representative Kamaka Manuel. Peters criticised the track record of the previous Labour Government towards Māori while Jones expressed support for reviewing the powers of the Waitangi Tribunal. Luxon, Peters and Jones' speech were booed by members of the audience. Greens co-leader Marama Davidson criticised ACT leader David Seymour's decision not to attended the Rātana gathering as a "dishonour" to the Māori world. Seymour defended his decision not to attend, citing their past decision not to invite him and described Rātana festivities as a religious event.

In early February 2024, Beverly Te Huia and the smokefree coalition Te Rōpū Tupeka Kore filed separate Waitangi Tribunal claims opposing the Government's proposed repeal of Smokefree legislation. In response to the legal challenges, NZ First MP and cabinet minister Shane Jones reiterated his threat to review the Waitangi Tribunal's scope and claimed that voters had supported a reset.

In early February, a delegation of government MPs led by Luxon, Peters and Seymour visited the Treaty House in Waitangi as part of the annual Waitangi Day gathering; a long-standing tradition for New Zealand's political leadership. Government figures faced a hostile reception from many of the attendees, with Peters and Seymours' speeches being booed and heckled. On Waitangi Day (6 February), thousands including Māori activists Hone Harawira and Annette Sykes gathered outside Treaty House to protest against the Government's Māori language policies and proposed Treaty Principles legislation. In response to criticism, NZ First Minister Jones rejected allegations that the Government's Treaty Principles legislation was degrading tino rangatiratanga (self determination). Seymour claimed that the Government believed in tino rangatiratanga, citing its plans to devolve decision-making power from the central government to Māori. Luxon also acknowledged that past governments had not upheld the promises of the Treaty but stated that "no other country has attempted to right its wrongs."

On 17 March Deputy Prime Minister Winston Peters made remarks comparing co-governance to Nazi Germany's race-based theories. He said "Some people's DNA made them, sadly, according to these people and condoned by their cultural fellow travelers, their DNA made them somehow better than others. I've seen that sort of philosophy before. I saw it in Nazi Germany. We all did. We've seen it elsewhere around the world in the horrors of history." During the speech, Peters spoke about removing gender and sexuality lessons from the school curriculum, and making English an official language of New Zealand. Peters' remarks likening co-governance to Nazism and the Holocaust were criticised by the Holocaust Centre of New Zealand's spokesperson Ben Kepes, who described them as offensive to Holocaust victims and survivors. Labour leader Chris Hipkins accused Peters of "using racism and anti-media rhetoric to divide the country." On 18 March, in an interview with Radio New Zealand, Peters doubled down on his comparison of co-governance with Nazi Germany's race-based theories. On 19 March, Peters refused to back down despite Prime Minister Luxon telling Peters his comments were unhelpful and reinforced the importance of politicians refraining from using divisive language. On 20 March, Peters claims Luxon's understanding of the situation was "misinformed" by the media. Peters told TVNZ Breakfast show "[Luxon] said to me, 'I was told this, this, and this,' and I said to him, 'By who? Did you hear my speech?' No. And then I realised, like most New Zealanders, all the way at the top, he's been misinformed by you media people, who think that your shill leftie biased message is going to triumph."

On 4 April 2024, the National Iwi Chairs Forum withdrew from the working group for the Ministry of Justice's National Action Plan Against Racism (NAPAR) due to their disagreement with the Government's plan to reduce the focus on colonial racism against Māori. Justice Minister Goldsmith defended the decision, saying that he had directed NAPAR to focus on racism against all groups. Acting Race Relations Commissioner Saunoamaali'i Dr Karanina Sumeo expressed concern at Goldsmith's plan to reduce references to Māori experiences of racism, saying that "racism in Aotearoa has deep historical economic, cultural, social, political and spiritual roots, enabled by individuals and within institutions. The ongoing harms to and losses for Māori must therefore be addressed in NAPAR if we truly want to eliminate racism."

In mid-April 2024, the Waitangi Tribunal summoned Minister for Children Karen Chhour to attend an urgent inquiry into the repeal of Section 7AA of the Oranga Tamariki Act. The Tribunal wanted the Minister to provide figures on the number of caregivers who had expressed concern about the impact of Section 7AA and examples of children being placed into unsafe conditions as a result of Section 7AA. On 17 April, Crown lawyers filed judicial proceedings in the High Court seeking to block the Tribunal's summons. ACT leader David Seymour criticised the Waitangi Tribunal's summons, saying that "they're buying a fight with someone with much greater mana." On 18 April, Minister for Oceans and Fisheries Shane Jones said: "The Waitangi Tribunal has no business running its operation like some sort of star chamber delivering peremptory summons for ministers to rock up and be either cross-examined or grilled in some type of wannabe, star chamber, American, Pulp Fiction gig." The Māori Law Society wrote a critical letter to Prime Minister Luxon and Attorney-General Judith Collins, saying that Jones' comments had the effect of undermining both the tribunal and its processes regarding a current case. They asked the Prime Minister and the Cabinet Office to investigate whether there had been a breach of the Cabinet manual, called on the Attorney-General to uphold the integrity of the judicial branch, and sought a meeting with Luxon and Collins to discuss the matter. Seymour also issued a press statement accusing the Waitangi Tribunal of "racial fanaticism" and defending Chhour's efforts to repeal Section 7AA. In response to media coverage, Luxon described Jones and Seymour's remarks as "ill-considered," adding "we expect all ministers to exercise good judgment on matters like this." On evening of 24 April, the High Court overturned the Waitangi Tribunal's subpoena to Chhour. Annette Sykes, a high-profile Treaty rights activist and lawyer, has confirmed that she will be appealing the High Court's ruling. Crown Law has indicated Chhour plans to introduce her bill to repeal Section 7AA of the Oranga Tamariki Act in mid-May. Once Parliament has the bill, the Tribunal must cease its investigation into the issue. On 29 April, the Tribunal released an interim report on the Government's proposal to scrap Section 7AA, saying that "the arbitrary and sudden nature of the repeal could pose a risk of harm to vulnerable children." The Tribunal is expected to release its report by 12 May 2024.

On 8 May 2024 Pita Tipene, the chairperson for Te Rūnanga o Ngāti Hine, challenged the Government's decision to reinstate referendums on Māori wards and constituencies in local government bodies as an attack on their efforts to uphold their Treaty of Waitangi obligations. The Tribunal will hold an urgent inquiry prior to the scheduled introduction of the Government's Māori wards referendums legislation on 20 May. On 9 May, the Waitangi Tribunal heard a sixth claim filed by several individuals including Ngāpuhi Kaumātua (tribal elder) Hone Sadler who argued that ACT's Treaty Principle Bill's interpretation of the Treaty of Waitangi was "inaccurate and misleading," and that Māori never ceded sovereignty to the New Zealand Crown. On 11 May, the Waitangi Tribunal ruled that the Government's proposed repeal of Section 7AA of the Oranga Tamariki Act breached the Treaty's guarantee of Māori self-determination and the Treaty principles of partnership and active protection. They urged the Government to stop work on repealing the legislation. Chhour responded to the Tribunal, saying "section 7AA was a measure introduced to address Treaty obligations. My concern is that it has taken the focus away from the best interests of the child."

On 13 May, the New Zealand Court of Appeal ruled in favour of the Waitangi Tribunal, overturning the High Court ruling. That same day, the Government's Oranga Tamariki (Repeal of Section 7AA) Amendment Bill was introduced into Parliament. On 15 May, the Waitangi Tribunal heard testimony from University of Auckland Māori Studies Professor Margaret Mutu, who argued that ACT's Co-Government Policy Paper misinterpreted the Treaty of Waitangi. In addition, Northland iwi Ngāti Kahu submitted a letter to King Charles III, calling on him to stop what they called a "violent attack" on the Treaty. That same day, several Māori health providers including Te Puna Ora o Mataatua, the Ngāti Hine Health Trust, Te Kohao Health and Papakura Marae challenged the Government's decision to abolish the Māori Health Authority in the High Court, alleging breaches of the Treaty of Waitangi and the New Zealand Bill of Rights Act 1990. On 17 May, the Tribunal ruled that the Government's plans to reinstate referendum requirements for Māori wards violated the Treaty.

In late May 2024, Te Pāti Māori and the Toitu Te Tiriti movement called for a nationwide day of protest known as "Toitū Te Tiriti National Day of Action" timed to coincide with the release of the 2024 New Zealand budget on 30 May. The protest was in opposition to the Government's perceived assault on Tangata whenua (indigenous status of Māori) and the Treaty of Waitangi. The party urged all Māori to strike and attend hīkoi (protests) and "car-koi" activation rallies near their location. Te Pāti Māori claimed that 100,000 people attended their protest events and advocated the establishment of a Māori parliament.

In late May 2024, the Hawke's Bay iwi (tribe) Ngāti Kahungunu organised a second national hui of unity at Omāhu Marae near Hastings. Kotahitanga (unity or solidarity) was the main theme of the second hui, which was attended by hundreds of people. Notable participants included Māori King Tūheitia Paki, Rātana Church tumuaki (leader) Manuao Te Kohamutunga Tamou, Māori Battalion veteran Sir Robert 'Bom' Gillies, Ngāti Kahungunu chairperson Bayden Barber,Ngāti Toa Rangatira chief executive Helmut Modlik, lawyer Annette Sykes, Member for Ikaroa-Rawhiti Cushla Tangaere-Manuel and Green MP Huhana Lyndon. Barber outlined plans for a Māori parliament while Modlik released his plan for a Federation of Māori Tribes.

On 6 June, 1News reported that Corrections Minister Mark Mitchell had sought cabinet approval to scrap several Treaty of Waitangi provisions from the proposed Corrections Amendment Bill, which would have compelled the Department of Corrections to improve Māori outcomes in the prison system. Key provisions included equitable rehabilitation and reintegration outcomes for Māori, giving Māori prisoners access to cultural activities and consulting with whānau (family), hapū (sub-groups) and iwi on decisions made about prisoners. This legislation had been introduced by the previous Labour Government, with Māori and iwi experts being involved in the development of the provisions. Green Party justice spokesperson Tamatha Paul defended the provisions and criticised the high Māori incarceration rate as an abuse of the Treaty. In response, Mitchell defended the Corrections Department's engagement with Māori families and hapū.

On 25 July, Justice Minister Goldsmith confirmed that the Government would amend section 58 of the Marine and Coastal Area (Takutai Moana) Act 2011 to require those seeking Customary Marine Title to prove they had continual exclusive use and ownership of the area since 1840. This law change disregarded a 2023 Court of Appeal ruling which lowered the threshold for proving customary marine title claims. This proposed amendment was also part of National's coalition agreement with NZ First. In response, Te Pāti Māori MP Tākuta Ferris accused the Government of taking away Māori rights and warned that the Government should expect protests. The Government's legislation reinstating referendums for Māori wards and constituencies in local councils drew criticism from opposition parties including Te Pāti Māori MP Mariameno Kapa-Kingi, who described it as an attempt to silence Māori and an "assault" on the Treaty of Waitangi.

On 2 August, leaders of the Ngāpuhi, Ngāti Manuhiri and Te Roroa tribes walked out of an Iwi Chairs Forum meeting with several government ministers including Luxon to protest several perceived anti-Māori government policies including the rollback of the Māori Health Authority and Māori wards and constituencies, plans to overturn a 2023 Court of Appeal judgement which lowered the threshold for marine title claims, the proposed removal of Section 7AA of the Oranga Tamariki Act 1989 and the forthcoming Treaty Principles Bill.

On 20 August, a 1News-Verian poll found that 46% of voters believed that racial tensions in New Zealand had worsened as a result of the Coalition government's policies. By contrast, 37% said there had been no difference, 10% said that tensions had reduced, and 7% said that they did not know. The poll surveyed 1,001 voters between 10 and 14 August 2024. It was released on the same day that Prime Minister Luxon and other senior ministers attended Māori King Tūheitia Paki's coronation anniversary celebrations. In response to the survey, Luxon said that the 2024 survey's results were little different from a similar 2023 survey which found that 43% of respondents thought racial tensions in New Zealand had worsened. Luxon reiterated that his Government was interested in improving outcomes for both Māori and non-Māori children.

In late September 2024, Education Minister Erica Stanford announced that the Government would divert NZ$30 million from the Te Ahu o te Reo Māori teacher training programme to revamp the mathematics curriculum. Flat Bush Primary principal Banapa Avatea and Post Primary Teachers' Association president Chris Abercrombie described the Government's decision as "disappointing and short-sighted" and undermining efforts to improve Māori language and cultural competence among teachers. Te Pāti Māori condemned the decision, saying that the Government would risk "the wrath of a million Mori." Stanford stated "an evaluation of the programme found no evidence it directly impacted progress and achievement for students", along with prime minister Luxon calling it a "crisis" and a "total system failure".

In mid-November 2024, the Hīkoi mō te Tiriti protests occurred in response to the first reading of the Treaty Principles Bill. In late November, the Waitangi Tribunal found that the Crown had breached the Treaty of Waitangi by disestablishing Te Aka Whai Ora. It urged the Government to reconsider re-establishing a stand-alone Māori health authority and consult with Māori. On 11 December the National Iwi Chairs Forum, a collective body representing over 80 tribal leaders, issued an open letter to King Charles III requesting that he intervene to address the New Zealand Crown's alleged breaches of promises made to Māori under the Treaty.

On 5 December 2024, the Government ended a pilot programme that would lower the bowel screening eligibility age for Māori and Pasifika individuals from 60 to 50 years. This decision was described as "devastating" to Māori health outcomes by the Māori Cancer Leadership Network, Waikato District Māori ward councillor Tilly Turner and Māori cancer health advocacy organisation "Hei Āhuru Mōwai" Gary Thompson. On 6 March, the Government reallocated funding from the cancelled program to lowering the bowel screening age for all New Zealanders from 60 to 58 years.

During the lead-up to the 2025 Waitangi Day, several Māori leaders and a group of Ngāpuhi women turned their backs on government ministers speaking at Waitangi. David Seymour had his microphone taken from him twice by Ngāti Wai leader Aperahama Edwards, who said that Seymour had been told not to speak at Waitangi and expressed opposition to his Treaty Principles Bill. In response, National Party minister Paul Goldsmith expressed disappointment, while NZ First minister Shane Jones threatened to withdraw funding from the Waitangi National Trust.

Following pressure by the ACT party, ACC Minister Scott Simpson instructed the Accident Compensation Corporation on 8 May 2025 to scrap Māori and Pasifika health targets in its new workplace injury proposal. Simpson had previously supported the tender, citing the high level of workplace injuries among these ethnic groups. ACT MP Laura McClure had objected to the ethnic health targets on the grounds they contradicted a government directive that public health services should be based on need rather than race. That same day, Regulation Minister David Seymour confirmed that the Government would pass legislation removing a legal requirement for early childhood centres to promote children's culture including recognising Māori as tangata whenua ("people of the land)" and teaching about the Treaty of Waitangi. Seymour said that the changes were meant to "streamline" operational requirements and reduce the regulatory burden on kindergartens. In response several Māori educators including Penina Ria and Zane McCarthy said the Government's changes would reverse hard-fought gains made by Māori and amounted to colonisation. Similar, Green MP and early childhood education spokesperson Benjamin Doyle said the policy shift "prioritised corporate greed and profit over public good and well-being."

On 7 June 2025, the Tertiary Education Commission confirmed it would remove extra funding for Māori and Pasifika enrolments in vocational courses and reduce funding for workplace training. The Government will continue funding for disabled students and those with low prior educational achievement.

On 26 June 2025, 32 Māori land trusts (representing over 150,000 landowners, hapu (sub-groups) and iwi (tribes) file legal proceedings against the New Zealand Crown at the High Court imploring the Government to stop the degradation of fresh water, honour the Treaty of Waitangi and Māori rights over water and geothermal resources.

In late July 2025, Internal Affairs Minister van Velden confirmed that the English language would take precedence over the Māori language on the front cover of the New Zealand passport. In 2021, the passport cover design had been updated to have the Māori words "Uruwhenua Aotearoa" printed above the words "New Zealand passport." NZ First leader Peters had previously lobbied for the Government's English-first policy. In response, Te Pāti Māori co-leader Ngarewa-Packer and Green MP Doyle accused the Government of undermining indigenous rights.

On 13 August 2025, Radio New Zealand reported that Education Minister Stanford had decided in October 2024 to exclude most Māori language words except for characters' names in the Education Ministry's "Ready to Read Phonics Plus" (RtRPP) series. According to an Education Ministry report, this was prompted by concerns that the inclusion of Māori words would be confusing for young children learning English. In response, Stanford said that the decision only affected 12 books within the series and that 27 books with Māori words would be reprinted. On 4 September 2025, Stanford rejected claims by several teachers and principals that the Government was reducing references to the Treaty of Waitangi and Māori words in education documents and curriculum statements.

On 4 November, Stanford confirmed that the Government would amend the Education Act's provision for schools to implement the Treaty of Waitangi, stating that it was the responsibility of the New Zealand Crown rather than schools. She said that schools would focus on promoting equitable outcomes for Māori students, offering Māori language instruction and "cultural competence." In response, several teaching representative bodies including the New Zealand School Boards Association, the Principals Federation, the New Zealand Educational Institute along with the Māori leadership body, the National Iwi Chairs Forum criticised the government's changes, claiming it would undermine the legal standing of school boards, damage social cohesion, and purge Māori language and cultural training from the school curriculum. Associate Education Minister Seymour defended the policy change, stating that the law change would allow schools to decide whether to teach Māori language and culture. By 13 November, over 200 school boards had issued letters objecting to the proposed removal of Treaty obligations from the Education and Training Act. By 23 November, 1,007 schools had reaffirmed their commitment to the Treaty of Waitangi. On 8 December, the National Iwi Chairs Forum delivered a 24,000-strong petition urging the Education Minister to reverse the amendment.

On 5 December 2025, the United Nations' Committee on the Elimination of Racial Discrimination (CERD) released a report expressing concern that multiple government policies affecting Māori could weaken the implementation of the radical discrimination convention. These policies included the disestablishment of the Māori Health Authority, cuts in public funding to Māori health services and minimising the role of the Treaty of Waitangi in schools and governing arrangements. In late November 2025, Lady Tureiti Moxon had submitted a complaint against the New Zealand Government to the CERD committee in Geneva. The CERD committee also heard submissions from both Māori community leaders and representatives of the New Zealand government including Justice Minister Goldsmith. Moxon welcomed the report, stating that "CERD is clear: New Zealand is moving backwards on racial equality, and Māori rights are under serious threat." By contrast, ACT leader and deputy prime minister David Seymour and NZ First cabinet minister Shane Jones condemned the report, criticising the UN panel for alleged hypocrisy. Goldsmith expressed disagrement with the report but reiterated the Government's commitment to improve outcomes for Māori.

On 13 February 2026, Newstalk ZB reported that Cabinet had decided in October 2025 to drop the school lunch programme's Māori name Ka Ora, Ka Ako while retaining its English name "Health School Lunches." Associate Education Minister Seymour justified the revamp on the grounds that people were more familiar with the English name. By contrast, Green MP Teanau Tuiono described the move as "racist, pathetic and anti-Māori."

In April 2026, Cabinet commenced plans to weaken references to the Principles of the Treaty of Waitangi across 23 laws as part of the National Party's coalition agreement with New Zealand First. This review was led by a ministerial oversight group consisting of Justice Minister Goldsmith as chair, the-then Attorney-General Judith Collins, Regional Development Minister Shane Jones and Māori-Crown relations Minister Tama Potaka. They were also assisted by a ministerial advisory group consisting of lawyer David Cochrane as chair, iwi leader Marama Royal, lawyer John Walters and lawyer and Act Party candidate James Christmas. During the consultation process, Goldsmith directed Justice Ministry officials not to hold regional hui (meetings) with iwi but to instead engage with a ministerial advisory group and several government agencies. The review of Treaty Principles clauses attracted criticism from several Māori leaders, legal and Treaty experts including University of Auckland law professor Margaret Mutu, associate professor Andrew Erueti, Te Pāti Māori co-leader Rawiri Waititi, Northland leader Pita Tipene, Victoria University of Wellington law senior lecturer Luke Fitzmaurice-Brown and the National Iwi Chairs Forum who said they would undermine the Crown's Treaty obligations to Māori. Despite the Ministry of Justice advising against the removal of Treaty clauses and the ministerial advisory group recommending tweaks to make the Treaty clauses more "descriptive," Goldsmith confirmed that the Government would proceed with plans to weaken Treaty obligations in mid-April 2026.

In early May 2026, Radio New Zealand reported that the review is would affect nine laws; with five laws having Treaty principles provisions repealed, two laws having their Treaty principles provisions consolidated, and two laws having their Treaty principles provisions amended to make them "more specific." On 15 May, the Waitangi Tribunal found that the Government's proposed overhaul of Treaty clauses in education law constituted a breach of the Principles of the Treaty of Waitangi. It urged the Government to abandon work on such legislation and consult with Māori. That same day, Goldsmith confirmed the Government was seeking to amend Treaty clauses in 19 pieces of legislation. On 31 July, the Waitangi Tribunal released its full ruling on the Government's Treaty review and urged the Government to pause the review and engage in "meaningful consultation" with Māori.

On 20 July 2026, Luxon and Bishop announced that the Government would scrap the Mana Whakahono ā Rohe agreements between local councils and Māori iwi as part of its RMA reforms. Bishop said that these agreements would be replaced with "new narrowly scoped iwi participation agreements." At the time, local councils were engaged in 20 council-iwi agreements with iwi groups. The announcement coincided with the select committee completing its reports on the Planning and Natural Environment Bills. In response, the opposition Labour, Green and Māori parties criticised the proposed replacement laws for their regulatory relief provisions for landlords, weakening environmental regulations and for benefiting private property and extraction interests. Labour leader Chris Hipkins expressed concern that the scrapping of council-iwi agreements would lead to the "relitigating" of existing Treaty of Waitangi settlements. Similarly, Ngāti Hine chair Rowena Tana and Northland Regional Council chair Pita Tipene said that scrapping the council-iwi agreements would hurt relations between local governments and iwi groups.

=== Public sector job cuts ===
As part of budgetary cutting measures, the Government had asked the public service in 2024 to find savings of NZ$1.5 billion through job cuts. Affected departments and agencies have included the Department of Conservation, the Ministry of Business, Innovation and Employment (MBIE), the Ministry for Culture and Heritage, Tertiary Education Commission (TEC) and Crown Law Office. By 10 April 1News reported that 1,275 public sector jobs had been lost, including 366 actual redundancies and 909 proposed redundancies. RNZ reported 1,959 redundancies and vacancies, citing ministerial and Public Service Association (PSA) statements. On 11 April the PSA national secretary Kerry Davies expressed concern that women were disproportionately represented in the 28 redundancies at the TEC. By 19 April public sector job cuts had reached 3,042. Minister for Regulation David Seymour previously indicated the number of layoffs could eventually hit 7,500.

By 2 May the total number of public sector job cuts had reached 3,745, and all Stats NZ staff had been offered voluntary redundancy, according to the Public Service Association. By 23 May, the total number of public sector job cuts had reached 4,975.

On 18 July the Employment Relations Authority ruled in favour of the Public Service Association's challenge against the Ministry of Education for cutting nearly 600 jobs. The Authority ruled that the Ministry should have consulted the union over the job cuts.

By 3 December there had been 9,250 job cuts across the public sector in line with the Government's directive for government departments and agencies to find cost savings of either 6.5% or 7.5%. The top ten affected departments and agencies were Health New Zealand (2,042), Ministry of Social Development (941), Ministry of Education (755), Department of Internal Affairs (672), Kāinga Ora (540), Oranga Tamariki (419), Ministry of Business, Innovation and Employment (402), Ministry for Primary Industries (391), New Zealand Police (373 non-police officers) and the Accident Compensation Corporation (300). By 28 May 2025, this figure has risen to 9,520 due to job layoffs at smaller agencies such as AgResearch, GNS Science and the National Institute of Water and Atmospheric Research (NIWA).

In early December 2024, the New Zealand Defence Force confirmed that it was planning to cut NZ$50 million from its wage bill and to layoff staff due to rising costs, restructuring and the sinking of HMNZS Manawanui.

=== Road cone hotline ===
In June 2025, the Government launched a road cone hotline for people to report perceived excessive uses of traffic management road cones to WorkSafe New Zealand. By early June 2025, the hotline had received over 650 reports, with Auckland Transport receiving nearly 200 reports. By late July 2025, WorkSafe had received 217 reports, with the majority occurring in the Auckland, Wellington and Canterbury Regions. On 19 December, the Government shut down the road cone hotline scheme due to deceasing usage and a low volume of valid complaints. The hotline had received about 1,300 notifications over a six-month period and had cost about NZ$150,000. While Labour transport spokesperson Tangi Utikere described the road cone hotline as a waste of taxpayer money, Workplace Relations and Safety Minister Brooke van Velden argued "that it gave the public a voice, identified the root causes of concern and clarified WorkSafe's role in temporary traffic management."

=== Sex education curriculum changes ===
As part of National's coalition agreement with New Zealand First, the Government has committed to removing gender, sexuality and relationship-based guidelines from the education curriculum with a stated goal of refocusing the education curriculum on "academic achievement" rather than "ideology". These guidelines had been developed by a team led by University of Auckland education professor Katie Fitzpatrick and introduced in 2020 by then NZ First MP and Associate Education Minister Tracey Martin. These guidelines consisted of two documents for primary and secondary pupils, and focused on teaching young people how to handle social media, pornography and sexual content online. Education Minister Erica Stanford stated that the Government was committed to rewriting sex education-related guidelines due to concerns from parents regarding their "age-appropriateness" as part of the National-NZ First coalition agreement.

Several educators including Fitzpatrick, sexual harm prevention expert and Ngā Kaitiaki Mauri Taumata TOAH-NNEST representative Russell Smith, and Post Primary Teachers' Association acting president Chris Abercrombie expressed concerns about the implications of the Government's plans to remove sex education-related guidelines for young people. Green Party co-leader Marama Davidson accused the Government of appealing to what she described as "a small very conservative section of the community who are up in arms about this being taught in schools." Cambridge Middle School Principal Daryl Gibbs stated there were some "grey areas" in the relationships and sexuality education guidelines that needed clarification but expressed concerns that eliminating them would alienate or isolate some sectors of the community.

By contrast, emeritus Professor Sue Middleton supported replacing the guidelines since she disagreed with their definition that gender could be understood as "a continuum of masculinities and femininities" and that a person's gender is "not fixed or immutable." Middleton has argued that gender is not a matter of identity but rather biological sex. Deputy Prime Minister and NZ First leader Winston Peters defended plans to revise the guidelines, stating that parents had a "right to know what their child is being taught before, not after, the event and the replacement of current guidelines is about transparency."

On 10 December 2024, Education Minister Erica Stanford confirmed that the Government would revise the sex education curriculum after a critical Education Review Office report identified inconsistensies in schools' sex education teaching. The Government had last revised the sex education curriculum 20 years ago.

In mid-March 2025, The Spinoff and 1News reported that Ministry of Education removed the relationship and sex education guidelines from its website in mid-February in line with the approach endorsed by Cabinet. The removal of these guidelines was criticised by Sexual Wellbeing Aotearoa director health promotion Fiona McNamara, Haeata Community Campus health teacher Carolyn Leeson and the New Zealand Education Institute for causing confusion to the sex education curriculum. On 15 April 2025, the Government began consulting on a new draft curriculum for relationships and sexuality education in schools.

=== Speed limits changes ===
During the 2023 New Zealand general election, the National Party campaigned on reversing the previous Sixth Labour Government's "blanket" speed limit reductions. In July 2019, the Labour-led coalition government had released its "Road to Zero" 2020–2030 road safety strategy, which was modelled after the global Vision Zero movement. The Road to Zero strategy aimed to reduce road deaths by 40% by 2030 through reducing speed limits and installing more road safety features such as roundabouts and median barriers. This policy was adopted in 2020. By February 2022, Waka Kotahi had announced a review of speed limits and imposed stricter speed limit rules would be implemented around schools.

In March 2024, the National Government confirmed that it would be fulfilling its pre-election promise of reversing speed limit reductions. Its proposed new rules include raising 30 km/h limits back to 50 km/h, 80 km/h limits back 100 km/h and allowing maximum speed limits of 120 km/h on some roads. All school zones would have a variable speed limit of 30 km/h during drop-off and pick up times instead of a constant 30 km/h limit. Speed limit changes would require a cost benefit analysis that considers both safety and "economic impacts." Transport Minister Simeon Brown said that the public was dissatisfied with the previous Labour Government's speed limits reductions and that the National Government would adopt a more balanced approach. In response, several local councils, academics, health professionals and safety experts including the Horowhenua District Council, Timaru District Council, Kapiti Coast District Council, Global Road Safety Partnership CEO David Cliff and University of Canterbury Professor Simon Kingham expressed concern that reversing speed limit reductions would lead to increased road fatalities, safety risks and pollution.

=== Transgender issues ===
On 21 December 2023, The New Zealand Herald reported that the Government was threatening to withhold public funding from sporting bodies if they did not comply with a policy to "ensure publicly funded sporting bodies support fair competition that is not compromised by rules relating to gender." This policy was promoted by New Zealand First, whose sports and recreation spokesperson Andy Foster said would promote fairness and safety for female athletes. Transgender athlete and national champion mountain biker Kate Weatherly claimed that the Government's new policy would force transgender women to compete in men's competitions or be sidelined completely. During the 2023 election, NZ First had campaigned about transgender people in bathrooms and sports; which included introducing legislation requiring public bodies to have "clearly demarcated" unisex and single-sex toilets, restricting toilet access to individuals from the opposite sex, and requiring sporting bodies to have an "exclusive biological female category."

On 9 October 2024, Sport and Recreation Minister Chris Bishop directed national sporting body Sport New Zealand to review and update its 2022 Guiding Principles for the Inclusion of Transgender People in Community Sport. He said that the Guiding Principles were supposed to be voluntary rather than mandatory in accordance with the National-NZ First coalition agreement which "committed the Government to ensure that publicly funded sporting bodies support fair competition that is not compromised by rules relating to gender."

In late July 2025, Sport and Recreation Minister Mark Mitchell ordered Sport New Zealand to scrap its transgender inclusive sports guidelines following lobbying by the anti-transgender group Save Women's Sport Australasia. Labour's rainbow issues spokesperson Shanan Halbert described the scrapping of the transgender inclusive guidelines as a "step backwards" while the Greens' rainbow issues spokesperson Benjamin Doyle said that the Government had failed rainbow communities.

In mid November 2025, Health Minister Simeon Brown confirmed that Cabinet had decided to suspend the issuing new prescriptions of puberty blockers for children with gender dysphoria until the outcome of a major British clinical trial expected in 2031, which was triggered by the controversial Cass Review. NZ First leader Peters, whose party has campaigned against the use of puberty blockers for children, welcomed the decision. Similar sentiments were echoed by ACT's children's spokesperson Karen Chhour. By contrast, the Green MP Ricardo Menendez March criticised the decision, saying that it was influenced by overseas Culture War politics and that would it adversely affect the health of transgender children. Medical opinion was split, with University of Otago emeritus Professor Charlotte Paul supporting the Government's decision to restrict the issuing of puberty blockers in light of the Cass review and Youth health specialist Dame Sue Bagshaw and the Professional Association for Transgender Health Aotearoa (PATHA) denouncing the Government's decision as a "moral panic." On 1 December 2025, PATHA sought a legal injunction to stop the incoming ban on new puberty blocker prescriptions, which is expected to come into force on 19 December. On 17 December, Wellington High Court Justice Michele Wilkinson-Smith upheld PATHA's bid to delay the Government's restriction on new puberty blocker prescriptions, pending a judicial review.

On 21 October 2026, the High Court ruled that the Government's 2025 regulations banning new puberty blocker prescriptions for children and young people with gender dysphoria were unlawful. The ruling was welcomed by PATHA but was condemned by Family First New Zealand chief executive Bob McCoskrie and NZ First leader Winston Peters. Peters also urged the Health Minister to appeal the High Court ruling. A spokesperson for the Health Minister said the Government would introduce new safeguards for puberty blockers while ensuring that patients with medical needs could still access healthcare.

=== Tenancy policies ===
As part of National's coalition agreement with ACT, the Government restored "no-cause" evictions, reducing the notice period that tenants and landlords have to give for moving or selling property, gradually reintroducing mortgage interest deductibility on rental properties and establishing pet bonds for renters. While Renters' United criticised the Government for favouring landlords over tenants, the Property Investors Federation welcomed the new policies for alleviating the pressure on landlords, and stopping "tenants' tax". Meanwhile, Greyhound as Pets (GAP) NZ spokesperson Daniel Bohan welcomed the introduction of a pet bond, saying that it would make it easier for tenants to own pets.

=== Use of parliamentary urgency ===
On 15 March 2024, the Free Speech Union (FSU) criticised the Government's repeated use of "urgency" in passing legislation during its first 100 days in power. The Government had passed 14 laws under urgency over a period of 17 weeks compared with average of 10 across a whole term. The FSU advised that bills passed under urgency get less scrutiny from MPs and the public, and can become law without going through the full Select Committee process. They also wrote that the Government was not mandated explicitly to pass legislation which was not included in the policy manifestos of any of the three governing parties. In response, Leader of the House Chris Bishop criticised the FSU's assertion that the frequent use of parliamentary urgency amounted to a free speech issue and cancelled his Free Speech Union membership.

In May 2025, the Coalition government passed the Equal Pay Amendment Act 2025 under urgency. The Act raises the threshold for making pay equity claims, which critics say will make it significantly harder for women in female-dominated industries to bring forward and succeed in such claims. It extinguishes 33 active pay equity claims disregarding extensive work already invested by advocates, experts, and affected workers, particularly in sectors like health, education, and social services.

On 11 December 2025, Parliament passed two urgent laws delaying a ban on farrowing crates by ten years and legislation amending the Fast-track Approvals Act 2024. These were supported by the governing coalition parties but opposed by the opposition parties.
