= Children's rights in New Zealand =

Legal rights of children in New Zealand

The rights of children living in New Zealand are secured through various pieces of legislation. These include the Children's Commissioner Act 2003, the Oranga Tamariki Act 1989, the Care of Children Act 2004, the Education Act 1989, the New Zealand Bill of Rights Act 1990, the Crimes Act 1961, the Human Rights Act 1993, the Privacy Act 1993, and the Official Information Act 1982. The laws and policies comply with the United Nations Convention on the Rights of the Child, which New Zealand ratified on 6 April 1993.

In New Zealand a person is considered a child or "minor" until the age of 20. On reaching this "age of majority" the person is no longer a child in the eyes of the law, and has all the rights and obligations of an adult. There are laws to protect young people from harm that they may be subject to due to their lack of maturity. Some legal age restrictions are lifted below the age of majority, trusting that a child of a certain age is equipped to deal with the potential harm. For example, 16-year-olds may leave school, and 18-year-olds may buy alcohol.

== History ==
=== 19th century ===
In the early 19th century, minors living in New Zealand were not given special rights in law, as they were not distinguished from adults. This position changed later in the century as minors were seen as a vulnerable group in need of protection; the concept of children's rights did not arise until later. The developments in the 19th century are indicative of the belief that children had a right to protection.

Timeline of 19th century events
Date	Parties	Event
1867	Neglected and Criminal Children Act 1867	Permitted provincial councils to provide care and custody of children who were neglected or orphaned.
1877	Education Act 1877	Free and compulsory education was provided for all standard six (year eight) New Zealand children. Public schools were set up by regional education boards.
1893	New Zealand Society for the Protection of Women and Children	The society was a voluntary organisation that aimed to protect children from neglect and abuse.

=== 20th century ===
The rights of minors in New Zealand became increasingly acknowledged and expanded in the 20th century. Towards the end of the century New Zealand began to follow the international movement towards enhancing and protecting the lives of children.

Timeline of 20th century events
Date	Parties	Event
1907	Royal New Zealand Plunket Society	The society was founded by Truby King (1858–1938) to help mothers with their babies, who were dying from malnutrition and disease.
1919	Edward Hunter (1885–1959)	Hunter, a trade unionist, founded the Rights of Childhood League, which brought together like-minded groups to lobby for an improvement to child's welfare. He also published a booklet called the Rights of Childhood.
1925	Child Welfare Act 1925	Passed by the Reform Government, this Act established the Child Welfare Division, which was responsible for deprived and delinquent children.
1933	The Marriage Amendment Act 1933	Raised the minimum Age of Marriage raised to 16 years. Previously it was 14 years and 12 years for males and females respectively. Marriage in New Zealand has been amended by various legislation including further protections for minors but the minimum age threshold has not changed since 1933.
1959	United Nations	As part of a growing movement on children's rights, the United Nations General Assembly adopted an expanded version of the Declaration of the Rights of the Child, which was originally drafted by Save the Children founder, Eglantyne Jebb in 1923. New Zealand was a member of the United Nations at this time.
1968	Guardianship Act 1968	Defined and regulated the authority of parents as guardians. More importantly, it gave children paramount welfare status above other considerations, including parent's rights.
1969	Status of Children Act 1969	Gave equal status to minors, regardless of their country of birth or the marital status of their parents.
1990	New Zealand Bill of Rights 1990	Prohibited discrimination on the grounds of age (applicable only to those 16 years or over).
1993	United Nations	New Zealand ratified the United Nations Convention on the Rights of Children.

=== 21st century ===
The rights of New Zealand minors in the 21st century are being continually solidified through enacted legislation and a commitment to international law on children's rights.

Timeline of 21st century events
Date	Parties	Event
2001	United Nations Optional Protocol on the Involvement of Children in Armed Conflict	New Zealand ratified the Optional Protocol on the Involvement of Children in Armed Conflict, which came into force in 2002.
2003	Children's Commissioner Act 2003	Set up the Children's Commissioner, which is responsible for monitoring and reporting on the services provided under the Children, Young Persons, and Their Families Act 1989, and also advocates for the interests and rights of children by raising awareness of the United Nations Convention on the Rights of the Child.
2004	Care of Children Act 2004	Provides for the paramountcy of minors' welfare and best interests when the courts are determining their guardianship and care. This paramountcy principle is given greater weight than in the predecessing Act, the Guardianship Act 1968.
2005	Marriage Amendment Act 2005	The Amendment Act defined a minor requiring the consent of a parent or guardian to marry as a person under the age of 18 years and thus lowered the age from 20 to 18. The minimum age of marriage remained unchanged at 16 years.
2010	Action for Children and Youth Aotearoa	Action for Children and Youth Aotearoa published their third non-governmental report to the UN Committee on the Rights of the Child.
2011	United Nations Optional Protocol on the Sale of Children, Child Prostitution and Child Pornography	New Zealand ratified the Optional Protocol on the Sale of Children, Child Prostitution and Child Pornography, which came into force in 2002.
2018	Minors (Court Consent to Relationships) Legislation Act 2018	A private members bill requiring court consent for the marriage of 16 and 17-year-olds designed to prevent forced marriages, amending the Marriage Act and broadened to cover civil unions and de facto relationships in addition to marriages, passed its third reading on 8 August 2018, received Royal Assent on 13 August 2018, and came into force as the Minors (Court Consent to Relationships) Legislation Act 2018 on 14 August 2018.
2022	Oversight of Oranga Tamariki System Act 2022; Children's Commissioner Act 2022	On 24 August 2022, the Sixth Labour Government passed two new laws replacing the Children's Commissioner with the Children and Young People's Commission and splitting oversight of the Oranga Tamariki (Ministry for Children) system between the Independent Children's Monitor and Ombudsman's Office.
2025	Oversight of Oranga Tamariki System Legislation Amendment Act 2025	In late June 2025, the Sixth National Government passed a law redesignating the Independent Children's Monitor as an independent Crown agency, dissolving the Children ann Young People's Commission, and reinstating the Children's Commissioner.

== Types of rights ==
Minors in New Zealand have rights that fall within two categories of human rights. First, minors have the same general human rights as adults. However, there are some limitations on rights that a minor may only benefit from once they reach a certain age. Some examples of age-dependent rights are the right to marry, the right to vote, the right to adoption, or the right to gamble. Second, minors have special human rights that serve to protect them as they have needs and concerns that are distinct to their age group. These include rights to an adequate standard of living, health care, education, and the right to protection from discrimination, abuse, and neglect.

The rights of children are multi-faceted and can be defined according to their social, cultural, civil, political or economical features. Typically, children's rights fall into two sub-categories that either advocate for children as autonomous agents under the law, or view children as dependant and in need of protection from harm. This two-pronged approach is illustrative when comparing children's right and youth rights. The difference between children's rights and youth rights is that the former is focused on the protection and welfare of the individual. The latter is concerned with a more expansive approach to individuals who have reached a specific age or maturity. For example, an individual may consent to sexual activity with another individual, if both individuals are 16 years or older.

=== Education ===
The right to education is not specifically stated in New Zealand domestic law, however it is reflected in the Education Act 1989, the Education Standards Act 2001 (an amendment to the Education Act 1989), and the Private Schools Conditional Integration Act 1975. The law on education in New Zealand is underpinned by the universal recognition of the entitlement to education found in Article 26 of the Universal Declaration of Human Rights and Articles 13 and 14 of the International Covenant on Economic, Social and Cultural Rights.

There are three levels to the right to education in New Zealand:

- Primary: This level is free and compulsory at the age of 6 years old. However, a child of 5 years old may enrol and attend school, although it is not required at this age.
- Secondary: This level is also free and compulsory up until the child turns 19 years. However, a child may leave school at the age of 16 years.
- Tertiary: This level is not compulsory. The minimum age at which a student may enrol in a tertiary institution is typically set at 16 years.

There are also a range of rights and obligations that surround aspects of attendance in a primary of secondary school. For instance, a child between the ages of six and under 16 may be employed, although not within school hours. Once a child is 16 years or older, they have the right to leave school and be employed during the hours when they would attend school. Furthermore, if a child is under the age of 16 years, the parents of the child may refuse attendance of a particular class, based upon religious or cultural grounds. Once the child has reached the age of 16 years, they may ask to be released from the class themselves, although a request must be in writing and the principal of the school must be satisfied that the request is genuine and adequate supervision is provided.

=== Children in the courts ===
The laws covering minors in New Zealand courts are reflective of the balancing act between considering child protection and advocating children as autonomous agents. On the one hand, recent legislation has meant that in cases over disputes of day-to-day care or parental relocation, a child's welfare and best interests are regarded as needing protection. Therefore, the rights of the child often override other considerations, such as the parent's interests or rights. However, other legislation establishes children as autonomous by allowing for a child between the ages of 10 years and 14 years to be charged with serious offences such as murder or manslaughter.

==== Child protection in the courts ====
The Care of Children Act 2004 is the most recent piece of legislation covering the rights of minors in New Zealand. Its predecessor was the Guardianship Act 1968, which places the minor as a paramount consideration. The new Act strengthened the approach taken towards minors by ensuring that any judicial proceedings taken under the Act must take into account the general theme of a minor's welfare and best interests. Furthermore, the Act also gives the minor the right to express his or her own views, especially in cases where the day-to-day care of the minor is in question.

==== Child autonomy in the courts ====
While minors require protection in the law, New Zealand recognises that at certain ages specified in law, minors have the maturity to understand and be responsible for their acts. People who are below the general age of majority but have reached a specific age are deemed to have the same liability for crime they commit as adults. For example, a child of at least 14 may be charged with any crime within New Zealand. However, criminal cases involving minors under 18 are tried in the Youth Courts.

== See also ==
- Child poverty in New Zealand
- Youth justice in New Zealand
