= Oranga Tamariki (Repeal of Section 7AA) Amendment Act 2025 =

Act of Parliament in New Zealand

New Zealand Parliament
- Royal assent: 7 April 2025

Legislative history
- Introduced by: Karen Chhour
- First reading: 21 May 2024
- Second reading: 12 February 2025
- Third reading: 3 April 2025
- Passed: 3 April 2025

Related legislation
- Oranga Tamariki Act 1989
- Status: Current legislation

The Oranga Tamariki (Repeal of Section 7AA) Amendment Act 2025 is a New Zealand Act of Parliament that repeals Section 7aa of the Oranga Tamariki Act 1989. Introduced by the Sixth Labour Government, Section 7aa had required Oranga Tamariki (the Ministry of Children) to focus on reducing disparities for Māori children and young people, take into account Māori whakapapa (genealogy) and family ties when uplifting children, and partner with iwi (tribes) and Māori organisations. Following the 2023 New Zealand general election, the Sixth National Government committed to repealing Section 7AA as part of the ACT party's coalition agreement with the National Party. The repeal legislation passed into law on 3 April 2025.

== Key provisions ==
The Oranga Tamariki (Repeal of Section 7AA) Amendment Act 2025 is an omnibus legislation that amends the Oranga Tamariki Act 1989, the Oversight of Oranga Tamariki System Act 2022 and the Oversight of Oranga Tamariki System Regulations 2023. It inserts a new Section 7 into the Oranga Tamariki Act 1989 requiring the chief executive of Oranga Tamariki (the Ministry for Children) to develop strategic partnerships with iwi and Māori organisations including iwi authorities to improve the well-being and outcomes of Māori children, young people and their families.

It amends the Oversight of Oranga Tamariki System Act 2022 to require the Independent Children's Monitor to consider information from annual reports on outcomes for Māori children, young people and their families. The Act also amends the Oversight of Oranga Tamariki Regulations 2023 to ensure that annual reports assess the outcomes and impact of policies on Māori children, young people and their families.

== Background ==
=== Section 7aa controversy ===
On 1 July 2019, the Sixth Labour Government made several amendments to the Oranga Tamariki Act 1989. These amendments included Section 7AA, which requires Oranga Tamariki (the Ministry of Children) to focus on reducing disparities for Māori children and young people, take into account Māori whakapapa (genealogy) and family ties when uplifting children, and partner with iwi (tribes) and Māori organisations. Section 7AA sought to reduce the high uplifting rate of Māori children by state agencies and to ensure that uplifted children were not disconnected from their Māori families and culture. The cause célèbre behind the repeal involved a case where four Māori children were uplifted from their English foster parents. Oranga Tamariki staff had made unsubstantiated claims that the foster parents had locked children in a paddock, physically abused the children, and 'neglected to meet the cultural needs of the children'. Newsroom aired a documentary that showed the children crying as they were being taken away to live with their half-uncle and aunt. Karen Chhour cited the case as reason to repeal section 7AA.

During the lead-up to the 2023 New Zealand general election, the opposition ACT party campaigned on repealing Section 7AA, saying that it prioritised race-based factors over the safety and well-being of Māori children. Following the 2023 election, the newly-formed National-led coalition government announced that it would repeal Section 7AA as part of the National Party's coalition agreement with ACT. In response, Waikato-Tainui iwi's (tribe) chairperson Tukoroirangi Morgan announced that his iwi would oppose the Government's plans to repeal Section 7AA. Chief Children's Commissioner Dr Claire Achmad also expressed concerns that the repeal would reverse gains made by Māori in ensuring that uplifted Māori children remained connected with their families and culture.

=== Waitangi Tribunal hearing ===
On 23 December 2023, Te Tāwharau o Ngāti Pūkenga, the post settlement body for the Ngāti Pūkenga iwi, filed an urgent claim with the Waitangi Tribunal challenging the Government's plans to repeal Section 7AA. Minister for Children and ACT MP Karen Chhour had lobbied for the repeal of Section 7AA, arguing that the policy prioritised the Treaty of Waitangi and cultural needs over the well-being of vulnerable Māori children.

In mid-April 2024, the Waitangi Tribunal summoned Chhour to attend an urgent inquiry into the proposed repeal of Section 7AA. The Tribunal requested Chhour submit figures on the number of caregivers who had expressed concern about the impact of Section 7AA and examples of children being placed into unsafe conditions as a result of Section 7AA. On 17 April, Crown lawyers filed judicial proceedings in the High Court seeking to block the Tribunal's summons. The Tribunal's summons was criticised by New Zealand First MP Shane Jones and ACT leader David Seymour, who accused the body of behaving like a "star chamber" and of alleged "race fanaticism." On 24 April, the High Court overturned the Waitangi Tribunal's subpoena to Chhour. In response, Treaty rights activist and lawyer Annete Sykes confirmed that she would be appealing the High Court's ruling. According to Crown Law, Chhour plans to introduce legislation repealing Section 7AA in mid-May. Once Parliament has received the repeal bill, the Tribunal is compelled by law to halt any investigations into the matter.

On 29 April, the Tribunal released an interim report arguing that the repeal of Section 7AA would harm vulnerable children. In early May 2024, Te Pāti Māori MP Mariameno Kapa-Kingi denounced the Government's plans to repeal Section 7AA, accusing them of seeking to "exterminate Māori."

On 11 May, the Tribunal ruled that the Government's proposed repeal of Section 7AA of the Oranga Tamariki Act breached the Treaty's guarantee of Māori self-determination and the Treaty principles of partnership and active protection. They urged the Government to stop work on repealing the legislation. On 13 May, the New Zealand Court of Appeal overturned the High Court decision squashing the Waitangi Tribunal's summons to Chhour to testify at a hearing about the Government's legislation to overturn Section 7AA of the Oranga Tamariki Act.

== Legislative history ==
=== Introduction ===
On 13 May 2024, the Oranga Tamariki (Repeal of Section 7AA) Amendment Bill was introduced into Parliament. On 21 May, the bill passed its first reading with the support of the governing National, ACT and NZ First parties. Labour MP Willow-Jean Prime, Greens co-leader Chlöe Swarbrick criticised the Government for not engaging with the Māori community and institutions' concerns. ACT MP and bill sponsor Chhour defended the Bill, arguing that uplifting children based on cultural needs and family desires harmed Māori children. Te Pāti Māori MP Mariameno Kapa-Kingi claimed that the Government was seeking to exterminate Māori culture and identity.

=== Select committee stage ===
The Social Services and Community Committee received 3,748 written submissions and heard from 117 oral submitters between 29 July and 7 August 2024. Of the total number of submissions, 1,377 (36.7%) supported the bill, 2,282 (60.9%) opposed the bill and 89 (2.4%) had no discernible opinion.

The committee released its report on 15 November 2024. They recommended that the bill progress into law but recommended that the bill retain aspects of Section 7AA requiring the Chief of Oranga Tamariki to develop strategic relationships with Māori and iwi (tribal) organisations, and that the amendment bill contain provisions for the Chief and Independent Children's Monitor to report on the well-being of Māori children and youth. The opposition Labour, Green and Te Pāti Māori members opposed the bill, claiming that it breached the Treaty of Waitangi, children's rights, and hindered Oranga Tamariki's transparency obligations.

=== Final stages ===
On 12 February 2025, the bill passed its second reading. On 3 April, the Government's legislation repealing Section 7AA passed its third reading, becoming law. While National, ACT and NZ First supported the bill, it was opposed by Labour, the Greens and Te Pāti Māori. Chhour said she was proud to lead the bill into the final stage in the House and welcomed its repeal, saying that Section 7AA was "well-intended but it resulted in children being put second." Green MP Ricardo Menendez March said the repeal bill targeted Māori children while Kapa-Kingi claimed it legitimised the uplifting of Māori children dating back to colonialism.
