= Boot camps in New Zealand =

Boot camps in New Zealand have been established on several occasions as part of the corrections system. These boot camp programmes have typically focussed on a small group of young male offenders, and have used military-style training. The establishment of boot camp programmes has been a pre-election promise made prior to several general elections since 2008 by political leaders from the National Party, and there has been a significant level of popular support. However, multiple studies have shown that these programmes are ineffective in reducing rates of re-offending, and some argue that they increase the likelihood of criminal activity. The concept has been widely criticised for failing to address the root causes of criminal behaviour by young people, such as abuse within the family, mental health issues and homelessness. As early as 1997, the Corrections Minister Paul East of the National Party acknowledged that corrective training was not effective in reducing youth re-offending and said:

It's clear from what Prison Officers are telling me that we need to provide these young people with programmes which target the reasons for their recidivism

As of 2025 the National-led coalition government is funding the establishment of boot camps as part of its youth justice programme.

== Early history ==
In 1961, New Zealand established detention centres where youth offenders aged between 16 and 21 years could be sentenced to a custodial sentence of three months of boot camp-style activities. These detention centres existed alongside borstals for youth offenders, which operated between 1924 and 1981. New Zealand set up its first boot camps in 1971. These were abandoned in 1981 and replaced with corrective training until 2002. The boot camps were regarded as a failure with a 71% rate of re-offending among corrective trainees. By 1997, the recidivism rate for correctional training graduates after five years had reached 92%, three times the rate of the general population. In June 1997, Corrections Minister Paul East concluded that corrective training had failed to reduce youth offending. Corrective training was abolished by the Sentencing Act 2002.

The Te Whakapakari Youth Programme, a Māori culture-oriented outdoor adventure programme in Great Barrier Island run by boxer John da Silva for youth offenders and "difficult to manage" state wards, ran between 1977 and 2004. The programme utilised physical exercise and labour, and was nicknamed "boot camp" by participants. The programme has come under the scrutiny of the Royal Commission of Inquiry into Abuse in Care due to reports of psychological, physical and sexual abuse.

== Military activity camps, 2010–2016 ==
Prior to being elected into Government in 2008 the National Party released a policy of using boot camps for those with drug problems. Between 2010 and 2016, the Fifth National Government ran military-style activity camps (MACs) run by Child, Youth and Family (CYF) and the New Zealand Defence Force (NZDF) for forty of the most serious recidivist young offenders which involved marching exercises, mentoring, drug and alcohol treatment programs, education, and an assisted move back into the community. The MAC consisted of a nine-week camp for serious, recidivist offenders in Christchurch, a court-supervised "Fresh Start" programme providing up to ten days of adventure camp activities, and a 6-12 month community Supervision Order involving a social worker.

By December 2012, 19 of the 31 youths who attended the camps in the past year had reoffended. 35 of the 42 participants in the first boot camp intake reoffended while 15 of the 17 participants in the second intake reoffended. While the-then Deputy Prime Minister Paula Bennett claimed the programmes had succeeded in lowering offending among that group, this was disputed by Prime Minister John Key's chief science adviser Sir Peter Gluckman in a 2011 report. The New Zealand Families Commission concluded that military camps and other measures such as curfews with electronic monitoring could not reduce re-offending on their own and that the most successful rehabilitation programmes involved the offenders' families. The MAC programme ended in December 2016 due to a decline in participants, rising costs and NZDF concerns about the safety of their personnel. According to a 2023 Oranga Tamariki briefing, the MAC programme faced several challenges including a lack of robust support to address the causes of offending and insufficient transitional support following the completion of the residential phase.

== National's proposed boot camps, 2017–2023 ==
On 13 August 2017, Prime Minister Bill English promised to establish a boot camp known as the "Junior Training Academy" for youth offenders at the Waiouru Military Camp during the 2017 election campaign. English clarified that the camp would be for a small group of around 150 young offenders who had committed serious offenses including serious assault, sexual assaults, aggravated robbery and murder. In response, youth justice advocacy group JustSpeak director Katie Bruce criticized the proposed boot camp policy and argued that it would do little to curb re-offending among young offenders. National's proposed policy was criticized by the radio host Mark Sainsbury, The Opportunities Party leader Gareth Morgan, the New Zealand First leader Winston Peters, and the University of Canterbury psychologist and author Jarrod Gilbert, who contended that the policy was aimed at enticing voters rather than helping youth offenders and that previous boot camp programmes had failed. The boot camp policy was also criticized by both National's support partner, the Māori Party, and the opposition Green Party for doing little to address youth offending within the Māori and the Pasifika communities. David Seymour, the leader of National's support partner the ACT Party, criticized the boot camp policy as a sign of the Government's failure to tackle "broken families" and youth crime.

While campaigning during the 2022 Hamilton West by-election in mid November 2022, National Party leader Christopher Luxon announced that if elected National would establish boot camps known as Youth Offender Military Academies for juvenile offenders aged between 15 and 17 years. These camps would be run by the Ministry of Justice and NZDF and would provided education, counselling, drug and alcohol treatment, and cultural support to offenders. Luxon's proposal was criticised by Prime Minister Jacinda Ardern, the NZ Psychological Society, and youth workers Aaron Hendry and Apiphany Forward Taua, who argued that boot camps failed to address the causes of youth crime. In addition, Gluckman criticised boot camps and other "scared straight" programmes for increasing crime. He advocated addressing juvenile delinquency and abuse through early intervention programmes, targeted mental health services, and complimentary services focusing on the Māori and Pasifika communities. By contrast, former Hamilton City councillor Mark Bunting opined that boot camps could help deal with high youth crime rates in the Waikato region and was preferable to sending youth offenders to prison.

In early December 2022, a 1News-Kantar public opinion poll found that 60% of respondents supported National's military boot camp policy while 31% opposed it and 9% were undecided. The poll surveyed 1,011 eligible voters including mobile phone users and online panels. Those most likely to support the boot camp policy were National and ACT voters, women aged 55 years and above, and Aucklanders. Those most opposed to the policy were Green voters, Wellingtonians, Labour voters, and those aged between 18 and 29 years.

In August 2023, National's police spokesperson Mark Mitchell said that the Youth Offender Military Academies would be modeled after the New Zealand Defence Force's six-week Limited Service Volunteer programme. Youth offenders would be able to undertake courses in numeracy, team-building, literacy and physical activities. He said that the Academies would last for one year and would be based at several military bases including Trentham Military Camp in Upper Hutt, Whenuapai's RNZAF Base Auckland, and Burnham Military Camp near Christchurch. The New Zealand Herald reported that National had not been in contact with the Defence Force, which offered no comment on the boot camp policy.

== Military-Style Academy pilot, 2024–2025 ==
In March 2024, Children's Minister Karen Chhour confirmed that the National-led coalition government would be launching a pilot programme for its Youth Offender Military Academies. The programme would be run by Oranga Tamariki and have a rehabilitative and trauma-informed care approach. The pilot camp would also have a military-style component. The pilot boot camp is expected to open in 2024 and will host ten young people for a period of four months. The Government's boot camp programme was criticised by Green Party co-leader Marama Davidson and Te Pāti Māori co-leader Rawiri Waititi, who said that military-style academies did not "resolve the driver of crimes" and that boot camps, borstals and boy's homes contributed to the persistence of gangs. The IHC director of advocacy Tania Thomas, Professor Joanna Kidman, Auckland youth development worker Aaron Hendry and human rights law firm Cooper Legal also expressed concern about the punitive nature of boot camps and their impact on disadvantaged children and young people, particularly Māori and the intellectually disabled. In response to criticism, Chhour argued that boot camps were needed to show young offenders "there were consequences for their actions but they could benefit from a chance to turn their lives around." Similarly, Police Minister Mark Mitchell argued that boot camps were needed because serious youth offenders were a "danger to the community...and themselves."

In mid June 2024, Radio New Zealand (RNZ) reported that Oranga Tamariki's pilot boot camp would open on 29 July with a first cohort of 10 teenagers. The boot camp would consist of three months of "military-style activities" and a special curriculum in a residential setting followed by nine months of intensive mentoring in the community with whanau (family) support. Research conducted by the Billy Graham Youth Foundation and Impact Lab found that boot camps reduced reoffending in the first 18 months but that reoffending rates increased after two years. They also advocated a therapeutic approach rather than a punitive approach to boot camps. In early July 2024, RNZ reported that the pilot boot camp would be based in Palmerston North. While the New Zealand Defence Force would not be staffing the boot camps, it would be involved at a governance level. Oranga Tamariki would be responsible for staffing the camps. According to Stuff, the Defence Force had expressed concerns about running the boot camps, saying that it would affect its workforce capabilities, staff morale and retention, and its lack of experience in youth justice management, educational and specialist therapeutics. The Defence Force also warned that it lack the legal mandate to manage youth detention facilities, which prompted the Government to introduce legislation giving boot camp operators the power to use force to detain participants.

In mid-August 2024, one of the youth participants withdrew from the pilot boot camp programme. According to Te Ao Māori News, participants underwent a structured daily routine consisting of washing, military-style drills, cleaning their rooms and ironing their clothes. In addition, participants also received individualised education and clinical sessions. In early September 2024, Stuff reported that the Military Style Academy and subsequent boot camps would provide participants outdoor excursions, martial arts training, yoga and access to therapists. While the academy targeted serious youth offenders who had been sentenced through the Youth Court, Oranga Tamariki excluded co-offenders, those with gang connections, physical and mental disabilities. Females were also excluded from the pilot programme due to the staffing requirements needed for mixed gender cohorts. In early November 2024, RNZ reported that the New Zealand Cabinet had authorised the use of physical force by boot camp operators to control unruly participants. In response, Luxon said that physical force would only be used as a "last resort" against youth offenders.

On 21 November 2024, a youth who had participated in the government's boot camp pilot was accused of reoffending five weeks after graduating from the programme. On 5 December 2024, Oranga Tamariki deputy chief executive Tusha Penny confirmed that a second boot camp participant had died in a motor accident near Tīrau and that another former boot camp participant, who had attended his tangihanga (funeral), was on the run. By 8 December two former boot camp participants, including the one who had attended the tangihanga, had been arrested in relation to the theft of a car near Hamilton. In response, Chhour expressed relief that the youths had been found while expressing disappointment with the youths. Meanwhile, Labour's children spokesperson Willow-Jean Prime and Green's justice spokesperson Tamatha Paul questioned the success of the government's boot camp programme.

On 15 February 2025, Malatest International released its evaluation of the Military-Style Academy pilot. While its report noted positive developments such as youth participants reconnecting with their families, health issues being addressed and the lack of fighting among participants, it also expressed concerns about insufficient staff ratios, and limited Māori language and cultural input despite the participants being Māori. These findings were supported by a follow-up released by Oranga Tamariki in November 2025, which also that 67% of participants had reported a drop in recidivism. RNZ also noted that the Military Style Academy Pilot faced similar issues around rushed implementation, challenging transitions, insufficient capacity in the residential phase and inadequate post-residential support with the military-style activity camps that operated between 2009 and 2010.

On 8 August 2025, Oranga Tamariki acknowledged that seven out of the ten participants in the pilot boot camp had reoffended. In response, the Minister for Children Chhour said that "zero re-offending was never going to be realistic" but claimed that "we have seen marked improvements in these young people's behaviour, attitudes to offending, and activities." By contrast, Labour's children spokesperson Prime described the boot camp programme as a complete failure and called for the Government to scrap its proposed boot camp legislation.

== Military-style Academies, 2025–present ==
On 31 January 2025, Save the Children New Zealand launched a 'Boot the Bill' campaign to oppose the Government's legislation establishing the legal framework for youth offender boot camps.

On 22 May 2025, the 2025 New Zealand budget allocated NZ$33 million to establishing youth boot camps and another $16 million to setting up the Youth Serious Offender category, which provides the framework for sending serious youth offenders to boot camps. In response, Aaron Hendry, the co-founder of youth development organisation "Kick Back", criticised the Government's boot camp funding decision, which he described as "child prisons." He argued that the money could be better spent on addressing child and youth homelessness.

In early March 2026, Radio New Zealand reported that the second military-style academy would begin on 9 March. As with the first pilot programme, the second boot camp would consist of 10 volunteers living at a Palmerston North youth justice facility. However, the residential phase of the programme will last for four months instead of three months, following by an eight-months supervised community phase. Oranga Tamariki will continue to run the programme, with support from Iwi provider Best Care (Whakapai Hauora), which had also designed the first pilot programme. By 6 March, the Government's Oranga Tamariki (Responding to Serious Youth Offending) Amendment Bill was still progressing through its select committee stage at Parliament. On 17 September, the Government's Oranga Tamariki (Responding to Serious Youth Offending) legislation passed its third reading. In response, Labour's children's spokesperson Willow-Jean Prime confirmed that the party would scrap the National-led government's boot camp programme if it won the 2026 New Zealand general election.
