= Oversight of Oranga Tamariki System Legislation Amendment Act 2025 =

Act of Parliament in New Zealand

New Zealand Parliament
- Royal assent: 30 June 2025

Legislative history
- Introduced by: Louise Upston
- First reading: 5 November 2024
- Second reading: 24 June 2025
- Third reading: 24 June 2025
- Passed: 24 June 2025

Related legislation
- Oversight of Oranga Tamariki System Act 2022; Children's Commissioner Act 2022
- Status: Current legislation

The Oversight of Oranga Tamariki System Legislation Amendment Act 2025 is a New Zealand Act of Parliament that serves as the legislative framework for both the Independent Children's Monitor and the Children's Commissioner, which oversee the Oranga Tamariki's (Ministry for Children) child welfare system and advocate for children's rights. The bill designates the Children's Monitor as an independent Crown agency and reversed a 2022 law change that replaced the Children's Commissioner with the Children and Young People's Commission. It passed its third reading on 26 June 2025, and received royal assent on 30 June.

== Key provisions ==
The Oversight of Oranga Tamariki System Legislation Amendment Act 2025 is an omnibus legislation that amends both the Oversight of Oranga Tamariki System Act 2022 and the Children's Commissioner Act 2022 (formerly the Children and Young People's Commission Act 2022) It amends the Oversight Act 2022 by redesignating the Independent Children's Monitor as an independent Crown entity and creates a three-member board to assist the Monitor. The Oversight Amendment Act also allows the appointment of a judge as a board member.

The Oversight Amendment Act replaces the Children and Young People's Commission with the reconstituted Children's Commissioner. The 2025 Act also requires the Children's Commissioner to have a knowledge of the Treaty of Waitangi, Māori knowledge and tikanga Māori. The 2025 Act also outlines the process for appointing a Children's Commissioner and designates the office as an independent Crown entity. The 2025 Act also allows the Governor-General of New Zealand to appoint a Deputy Children's Commissioner at the advice of the Minister of Social Development and the Children's Commissioner. The 2025 Act also amends references to the Children's Monitor and Children and Young People's Commission in several laws including the Children's Commissioner Act 2022, Crown Entities Act 2004, Ombudsmen Act 1975, Public Service Act 2020 and Remuneration Authority Act 1977.

== Background ==
In late August 2022, the Sixth Labour Government passed two laws overhauling the Oranga Tamariki's (Ministry for Children) child welfare system. The Oversight of Oranga Tamariki System Act 2022 established an Independent Children's Monitor within the Education Review Office to monitor Oranga Tamariki while the Children and Young People's Commission Act 2022 replaced the Children's Commissioner with a board known as the Children and Young People's Commission. The Labour Party used its parliamentary majority to pass the bills; with all other parties including the National, ACT, Green parties and Te Pāti Māori voting against them.

In addition, the Children's Commissioner Judge Frances Eivers, several children's advocates including Child Matters, Save the Children, and Social Justice Aotearoa, and the human rights organisations Amnesty International and the Human Rights Commission criticised the Government's reforms of the Oranga Tamariki oversight system.

== Legislative history ==
=== First reading ===
The Oversight of Oranga Tamariki System Legislation Amendment Bill was first introduced into the New Zealand Parliament by the Minister of Social Development and Employment Louise Upston on 31 October 2024. The bill passed its first reading on 5 November 2024 with the support of all parties. Labour Member of Parliament (MP) Willow-Jean Prime said that Labour supported enhancing the independence of the Independent Children's Monitor but did not support reducing the number of Children's Commissioners. Upston, Green MP Kahurangi Carter, ACT MP and Minister for Children Karen Chhour and New Zealand First MP Tanya Unkovich supported increasing the Monitor's independence and reverting to a single Children's Commissioner. Te Pāti Māori MP Mariameno Kapa-Kingi advocated creating an independent mokopuna (children) authority to look after the well-being of Māori children and young people.

=== Select committee phase ===
On 6 March 2025, the Social Services and Community Committee released its report on the Bill. It recommended three minor grammatical changes to references to the Children and Young People's Commission, the Oversight of Oranga Tamariki System Act 2022 and the third schedule of the bill. While the governing National, ACT and NZ First parties supported the Bill, the Labour Party expressed concern about the loss of representative diversity in reverting to the single Children's Commissioner model, defended the independence of the Children's Monitor being part of the Education Review Office and that the new bill did not address the Royal Commission of Inquiry into Abuse in Care's final recommendations regarding independent oversight and monitoring.

Te Pāti Māori opposed the Bill on the grounds that it undermined the voice of Māori communities and neglected the New Zealand Crown's Treaty of Waitangi obligations. The Māori abuse survivors group Te Whare Mōrehu criticised the Bill, saying that it would not improve the well-being and safety of Māori children and young people.

=== Final readings ===
The bill passed its second reading on 24 June 2025. The National, Labour, Green, ACT and NZ First parties supported the bill. Labour MP Prime reiterated the party's support for the legislation but expressed reservations about reverting from a team to a single Commissioner. Te Pāti Māori MP Tākuta Ferris stated that his party opposed the bill on the grounds that it did not involved Māori communal input and did not address the state's role in the abuse of Māori children in care.

That same day, the bill passed its third reading with the support of all parties except Te Pāti Māori. Green MP Carter welcomed the greater independence for the Independent Children's Monitor but said that more work needed to be done on child welfare. Ferris reiterated TPM's opposition to the bill, saying that it would not help Māori children trapped in the care of Oranga Tamariki. ACT MP and Minister for Children Chhour said that the greater independence of the Children's Monitor would boost public trust. The law was part of ACT's coalition agreement with the National Party following the 2023 New Zealand general election. The bill passed its final two readings and committee stage under urgency.

=== Royal assent ===
The bill received royal assent on 30 June 2025. It is expected to be reviewed in five years time.
