= Oversight of Oranga Tamariki System Act 2022 =

Act of Parliament in New Zealand

New Zealand Parliament
- Royal assent: 29 August 2022

Legislative history
- Introduced by: Carmel Sepuloni
- First reading: 16 November 2021
- Second reading: 27 July 2022
- Third reading: 23 August 2022
- Passed: 23 August 2022
- Status: Amended

The Oversight of the Oranga Tamariki System Act 2022 is a New Zealand Act of Parliament that establishes an Independent Children's Monitor to provide oversight over the country's Oranga Tamariki system, which provides services and support to children, young people, and their families under the provisions of the Oranga Tamariki Act 1989. The Bill was formerly part of the proposed "Oversight of the Oranga Tamariki System and Children and Young People's Commission Bill" until it was split into two separate pieces of legislation by the New Zealand Parliament on 11 August 2022. Together, the Oranga Tamariki Oversight Act and the companion Children and Young People's Commission Act 2022 replaced the Children's Commissioner, the independent national Children's ombudsman.

== Key provisions ==
The Oversight of Oranga Tamariki Act 2022's key provisions include:

- Establishing the Independent Children's Monitor, who serves as the chief executive of the Independent Monitoring Agency of the Oranga Tamariki system.
- Specifies that the Monitor be independent of Oranga Tamariki (the Ministry for Children).
- Monitoring the Oranga Tamariki system to ensure that its support the rights, interests, and well-being of children, young people, and their families who are receiving or have previously received services or support through that system.
- Monitoring the Oranga Tamariki system to ensure compliance with the Oranga Tamariki Act 1989, national care regulation standards, and other regulations and standards associated with the Oranga Tamariki Act.
- The Monitor must set up a Māori Advisory Group to promote meaningful engagement with Māori people, hapū (sub-groups), iwi (tribes), and organisations.
- The Monitor must produce various reports including a State of the Oranga Tamariki system report every three years and annual reports on compliance with national care standards regulations and outcomes for Māori children, young people, and their families.
- Empowers the Monitor to authorise their employees and authorised staff members to enter premises for monitoring purposes.
- Regulates the Monitor's ability to collection information from children, young people, and their care givers.
- The Monitor does not have the power to review courts and tribunals.

== History ==
=== Background ===
In November 2021, the Sixth Labour Government introduced the "Oversight of the Oranga Tamariki System and Children and Young People's Commission Bill" which proposed replacing the Children's Commissioner with a board consisting of between three and six people known as the "Children and Young People's Commission" that would focus on advocacy work. This bill was developed by the Minister of Social Development Carmel Sepuloni based on advice from Ministry for Social Development (MSD) officials. The Government also expressed its intentions to establish an Independent Children's Monitor within the Education Review Office to monitor Oranga Tamariki (the Ministry for Children), which would assume the Children's Commissioner's monitoring responsibilities. In addition, the Ombudsman's Office would also expand its portfolio to investigating complaints relating to children. The proposed law change was driven by the Government's concern that the Office of the Children's Commissioner's advocacy role would clash with its monitoring role.

=== First reading ===
The Government's Oranga Tamariki Oversight Bill passed its first reading on 16 November 2021 by a margin of 108 to 12 votes. While the ruling Labour Party, opposition National Party, and the ACT Party supported the bill, it was opposed by the Green Party and the Māori Party. The bill was subsequently referred to the Social Services and Community select committee.

=== Select committee stage ===
By 26 January 2022, the select committee had received 403 submissions from interested groups and individuals; with 311 opposing the bill and eight supporting the bill. While Labour supported the Oranga Tamariki System Oversight Bill, the National, ACT, and Green parties objected to the bill, citing the large number of opposing submissions and arguing that the Government should wait until the Royal Commission of Inquiry into Abuse in Care had concluded its hearings. On 13 June 2022, the select committee recommended the bill but specified several amendments including incorporating references to the Treaty of Waitangi, defining "care or custody providers," strengthening the independent monitor's role, and creating the position of Chief Children's Commissioner. In response, Children's Commissioner Judge Frances Eivers criticised the select committee for proceeding with the legislation without waiting for the Royal Commission to conclude its hearings, stating that "to pre-empt that work would be to make a mockery of those who were brave enough to tell their stories."

=== Second reading ===
On 27 July 2022, the Oranga Tamariki Oversight Bill passed its second reading by a margin of 65 to 54. While Labour supported the legislation, it was opposed by the National, Green, ACT, and Māori parties.

=== Committee of the whole house ===
On 11 August 2022, the Labour Government confirmed it would proceed with the Oranga Tamariki Oversight Bill despite opposition from the ACT, National, Green, and Māori parties. The National Party's child poverty and social development spokesperson Louise Upston stormed out of the debate in protest of the Government's stance on the legislation. Meanwhile, Logie argued for that the continuance of an independent children's ombudsmen in accordance with the principles of the Treaty of Waitangi. Social Development Minister Sepuloni rejected calls from other parties to slow progress on the Oranga Tamariki Oversight Bill, stating that the "Beattie Report" found that the Government needed to act on the issue urgently. Sepuloni also stated that the Government had consulted several children's advocacy groups including VOYCE Whakarongo Mai and adopted some of their recommendations. Following the "committee of the whole House" meeting held on 11 August, the legislation was split into two bills; namely the Oversight of Oranga Tamariki System Act 2022 and the Children and Young People's Commission Act 2022.

=== Third reading ===
On 23 August, the Oversight of Oranga Tamariki System Bill and the Children and Young People's Commission Bill passed their third combined reading along party lines; with Labour in favour and National, ACT, Green and Māori parties opposed. In addition, Eivers, several children's advocates including Child Matters, Save the Children, and Social Justice Aotearoa, and the human rights organisations Amnesty International and the Human Rights Commission voiced opposition to the Government's reforms of the Oranga Tamariki oversight system.

=== Amendments ===
On 26 June 2025, the Sixth National Government passed legislation designating the Independent Children's Monitor as a stand-alone independent Crown entity, dissolving the Children and Young People's Commission and reinstating the Children's Commissioner. The legislation was supported by all parties except Te Pāti Māori. These changes came into effect on 1 August 2025.

== Public responses ==
In response to the Oranga Tamariki Oversight Bill, Save the Children advocacy and research director Jacqui Southey, "VOYCE – Whakarongo Mai" spokesperson Tupua Urlich, children's advocate Piwi Beard, former MSD policy analyst David King, former Oranga Tamariki employee Luke Fitzmaurice, and Children's Commissioner Eivers expressed concerns that the Government's proposed changes would reduce the office's ability to monitor the wellbeing of children and advocate for their interests. Similar opposition to the Bill was echoed by civil society groups such as Manaaki Rangatahi, Barnardos and the Child Poverty Action Group (CPAG), and Save the Children, who expressed concerns that the bill would endanger the well-being of abused and vulnerable children. In late July 2022, Save the Children presented a petition of over 10,000 people opposing the Bill's changes to the Children's Commissioner's role and claimed that the legislation could breach the UN Convention of the Rights of the Child.

On 2 August 2022, former public servant David King and Victoria University of Wellington emeritus Professor of Public Policy Jonathan Boston released a report entitled Improving a System When Young Lives are at Stake. The report argued that establishing the Independent Monitor of Oranga Tamariki as a government department undermined its ability to advocate independently for children and young people. King and Boston argued that the proposed Children and Young People's Commission should be responsible for monitoring, advocacy, and handling complaints. They also urged the Government to wait until the Royal Commission had finished its work before proceeding with the legislation. Following the report's release, ACT Children's Spokesperson Karen Chhour reiterated her opposition to the Bill, stating that the proposed changes would cause young people to lose their trust in the Oranga Tamariki system. Meanwhile, the Green Party's Children Spokesperson Jan Logie expressed concern that the proposed legislation breached the Treaty of Waitangi and the United Nations' Declaration on the Rights of Indigenous Peoples.
