= Stoke Industrial School =

New Zealand Roman Catholic reform school

The Stoke Industrial School was a Roman Catholic reform school in New Zealand. During the mid-1890s, rumors about child cruelty at the Stoke Industrial School increased. In 1900, a Royal Commission addressed these allegations triggering criminal charges, extensive media reporting, religion-based antagonism and changes to the relevant New Zealand legislation.

== Background ==
In 1874, Rev. Father Garin established "The Orphanage" at Stoke, Nelson, New Zealand. In 1884, the euphemistically named St. Mary's Orphanage, was gazetted as St Mary's Industrial School with Dean William Mahoney as Manager. This industrial school was a privately run, Roman Catholic, reform school led by Mr Murphy with a staff of secular teachers and attendants. In January 1889, after management problems, Archbishop Redwood asked the Marist Brothers order to take charge of the institution. A French lay-teaching order took up the offer; however, they lacked the skills to cope with the full-time care of up to 180 boys aged from seven to sixteen years. In 1900, a Royal Commission instigated an amendment to The Industrial Schools Act, 1882, prohibiting the control of private schools by overseas organisations, thus forcing the departure of the Marist Brothers in September 1900. On 27 April 1903, fire destroyed the wooden orphanage also killing an eight-year-old inmate, William Wilson. A new brick orphanage opened on 24 May 1905. It accommodated 100 boys in two dormitories and had facilities for teaching boot making, carpentry, knitting and sewing. The school land accommodated a hop garden and a sheep and cattle farm. In 1919, the institution was closed due to Government policy changes.

== The orphan's lot ==
At the turn of the 20th century, widespread social dysfunction bore down on the children of New Zealand's most disadvantaged families. The Neglected and Criminal Children Act 1867 allowed provincial councils to administer the care and custody of children who were neglected or orphaned, however, most of the children housed in ‘orphanages’ were not orphans. Many had behavioural problems having been effectively abandoned by parents who were alcoholic, unemployed or in prison. Others had been removed, often by the courts, from immoral conditions such as prostitution. These "orphans" endured patronising attitudes and social stigma, as demonstrated in the following statement made by the Royal Commissioners, Bush and Wardell (1900):

The constantly recurring introduction into the [Stoke Industrial] school of boys fresh from crime or scenes of vice must keep in a constant ferment the evil existing amongst those already there... When we consider the inmates consist of two classes—criminal and neglected or indigent children—it appears to us that a great risk of injury to one class is incurred for the sake of the other, and that the more unworthy.

== Scandal ==
For many years, rumours had circulated about the poor conditions at the Stoke school. In July 1896, St Marys Director, Brother Loetus, wrote to the Nelson Evening Mail in an attempt to placate public disquiet generated by numerous escapes from the "orphanage". Most of the escapees had claimed that hunger had driven them to escape. Loetus asserted that these "waifs and larrikins...deemed unfit to be at large", had tired of discipline and had opportunistically escaped. When caught they resorted to the old "lack of food" ruse that was bound to gain maximum sympathy.

In May 1900, two boys, James Maher and Albert James absconded from the school. When they were recaptured, James Maher stated that he would prefer to be whipped by police than be returned to the school. Maher's statement finally spurred the Nelson Charitable Aid Board into action and on 30 May 1900, members of the board paid a surprise visit to the school. Their findings resulted in the tabling of Report of Royal Commission on the Stoke Industrial School, Nelson in the House of Representatives. Jesse Piper later testified under oath that he accompanied inspectors when they made their surprise inspection of St Marys. He said, "The children were very ill clad. I doubt very much whether you could pick up such a lot in the gutters of London ... I could not bring myself to taste the food". Piper also testified that they had very reliable information that there were boys in solitary confinement who were fed on bread and water and taken out to be whipped every day.

The inspectors were guided by Brother Augustine and his colleagues who all denied that children were being imprisoned, or that prison cells even existed in the school building. Refusing to be diverted by the evasive brothers, the inspectors confronted Brother Loetus who belatedly returned to the school. Two boys, one of whom was James Maher, were eventually discovered in separate confinement cells. A total of five small cells were located. Evidence given to the Royal Commission revealed that boys had been held in solitary confinement for periods as long as 3 months. Notably, The Industrial Schools Act 1882 Amending Act of 1895 specifically regulated confinement. "The Manager may at his discretion punish an inmate by restraint of liberty or by restriction of diet, subject, however, to the strict observance of the following rules: - Confinement in a dark cell is forbidden. Solitary Confinement for more than three hours in one day is forbidden."

== Complaints to the Royal Commission ==
The Commission of Enquiry opened in the Provincial Hall on 22 July 1900. The complaints brought by the Nelson Charitable Aid Board were:

1. The school was under the management of unmarried men. No matron was employed to look after the young boys.
2. The punishment of the boys was more severe than allowed at Government run schools.
3. Food was unvaried, insufficient in quantity and quality.
4. The boys were poorly and insufficiently clothed.
5. The work was too hard, especially for young boys.
6. Boys who died at the school were buried on the property.
7. St. Mary's Industrial School, being a private school under The Industrial Schools Act, 1882 was on a different footing to Government schools and not subject to the same supervision.

The Royal Commission's report presented to Parliament in late August 1900, determined that the school building and its outdoor facilities were excellent, however there were insufficient inside baths and toilets. It found standards of cleanliness were poor, a doctor should be appointed to visit periodically and the inmates required meaningful, organised work. The Commission criticised Father Mahoney for letting the management of the school pass from him to the Marist Brothers. It also laid much of the blame at the feet of Brothers, Wybertus and Kilian: "The flogging with supplejacks on the body, now long discontinued, verged on cruelty. The punishment on the hand with supplejacks is more severe than with cane, and it has been used too freely." The Commission disclosed that, by 1895, Wybertus and Kilian's authority to administer punishment had been rescinded; however, they were retained on the school staff and reportedly continued to inflict cuffs, blows and kicks upon the inmates. Accordingly, the Commission formed the opinion that a great deal of the evidence given by current and ex-inmates was tainted by antagonism towards Kilian and Wybertus.

== Changes ==
In regard to the Charitable Aid Board charges, the Royal Commission found:

1. At least two women should be employed for duties in the laundry, infirmary and dormitories.
2. The punishment was more severe than in government schools. Strokes on the hand with supplejack had been used freely, and with great severity in some cases. Brother Loetus had ordered more solitary confinement than should be allowed, without the knowledge of Fr Mahoney.
3. The food was sufficient in quantity and wholesome but lacked variety.
4. The clothing was of rough material but adequate in quality.
5. The work referred to in the charges related to boys being sent up a hill to bring down posts and poles. The Commission found that it was no more than bush settlers' sons of the same age were required to do. Neighbours said that the work was done with great hilarity and the boys regarded it as a holiday.
6. Burials on the property did occur, but the five acre cemetery had been properly gazetted in 1890.
7. The different standing of the school was a matter of law and it recommended that the Act be amended.

The Commission noted that the school had recently dismissed Brothers Loetus, Wybertus and Kilian, and had welcomed being placed under the same regulations as other Industrial Schools. The employment of women at the school probably improved conditions for the residents assuming that "the 'natural' instincts of women would not accept the 'unnatural' treatment of children". Nevertheless, the boys continued to make claims about beatings and extreme punishment which led to a departmental enquiry in 1904.

== Marist Brothers charged ==
The Stoke Royal Commission appears to have instigated one of the first Court cases where a Catholic clergyman was charged with child sexual exploitation. On 21 September 1900, the Magistrates Court began hearing charges against two Marist Brothers in connection with Stoke Industrial School. Edouard Forrier (Brother Wybertus) was charged with five counts of common assault and five counts of indecent assault. The alleged incidents occurred between 5 September 1893, and 1 June 1897. James Solan (Brother Kilian) was charged with six counts of common assault. These alleged assaults occurred between 1 August 1898, and 20 August 1900. During proceedings, sixteen informants and thirty witnesses gave evidence. In December 1900, Forrier and Solan were acquitted of all charges. Media reporting noted that the testimony against the accused had been contradictory, in one case provoking Mr Justice Edwards to remark "...[I] would not hang a cat upon it".

== Catholic press ==
By December 1900, The New Zealand Tablet was advising its predominantly Irish Catholic readership that the Royal Commission had been instigated by sectarian fanatics (the Orange Order) intent upon injuring the Catholic faith. The Nelson Evening Mail retaliated, claiming that the Roman Catholic clergy were not only spinning deceptive information, but were also adopting a militant attitude by placing "the Marist Brothers on a martyr's pedestal" In 1905, while reporting the opening of a new orphanage building at Stoke, The Tablet erroneously claimed that the Royal Commission of Enquiry had "exonerated the Brothers from all allegations of cruelty" and said that "panic legislation was passed by an excited majority of law-makers who sorely needed icebags to their heads."

== Ramifications ==
The St Mary's narrative became indicative of the entire reform school model prior to the First World War. The saga illustrated conditions that neither the private operators nor the government could be proud of. Unregulated managers and often incompetent staff inflicted excessive punishment upon forlorn and frightened residents who were enduring unpleasant conditions.

=== Joseph Thomas Daly ===
In 1896, a diminutive ten-year-old boy, Joseph Thomas Daly, appeared in the Wellington Magistrates Court charged with the theft of a canary and some bottles. He was initially remanded for a fortnight being in need of treatment due a mental condition; in later years, it was revealed that he suffered from epileptic fits. Upon reappearance in the Court he was committed to St Mary's Industrial School "to be brought up as a Roman Catholic". During the following decade, Joseph absconded from Stoke and Burnham Industrial Schools (1901 and 1903 respectively), was convicted and jailed for theft including several counts of defrauding priests and attempted suicide on three occasions. On 29 September 1908, in Masterton, Joseph was sentenced to 9 months imprisonment with hard labour on three counts of false pretence. He was convicted and discharged on a charge of attempting to commit suicide by cutting his throat with a razor. Joseph Daly disappeared after his release in 1909.
