= Children's Commissioner Act 2003 =

Act of Parliament in New Zealand

New Zealand Parliament
- Long title: Children's Commissioner Act 2003

Repeals
- Children's Commissioner Act 2022

Related legislation
- Children, Young Persons, and Their Families Act 1989
- Status: Repealed

The Children's Commissioner Act 2003 (Public Act no 121 2003) is an Act of the New Zealand Parliament. It reformed the office of the Commissioner for Children as the Children's Commissioner and implemented the United Nations Convention on the Rights of the Child, which is attached as Schedule 2 of the Act. In August 2022, the Children's Commissioner Act was repealed by the Children and Young People's Commission Act 2022, which established the Children and Young People's Commission.

== Key provisions ==
The Children's Commissioner Act 2003 repealed Part 9 of the Oranga Tamariki Act 1989 (then known as the Children, Young Persons, and Their Families Act 1989), which had hitherto established the functions and responsibilities of the former "Commissioner for Children." The Children's Commissioner Act created the Children's Commissioner, which assumed the functions and responsibilities of the Commissioner for Children. The legislation also establishes the Children's Commissioner as a Crown entity under the provisions of the Crown Entities Act 2004.

Other key provisions include:

- Empowering the New Zealand Prime Minister to recommend the appointment of the Children's Commissioner.
- Empowering the Children's Commissioner to investigate decisions, recommendations, policies, and practices relating to the Oranga Tamariki Act 1989.
- Empowering the Commissioner to develop a means of consulting with children.
- Investigating any decisions made/omitted in respect to any child or young person in their personal capacity.
- Promoting the establishment of an effective complaints mechanism for monitoring purposes.
- Advocating for children's interests, rights, and welfare.
- Raising awareness of the United Nations Convention on the Rights of the Child (UNCROC) and ensure that government agencies apply its provisions.
- Undertaking and promoting research on child welfare issues.
- Inviting or receiving public representations on children's welfare.
- Promoting the participation of children in decisions which affect their lives.
- Reporting to the Prime Minister on matters relating to children's rights.
- Investigating and reporting on any law, practice or procedure relating to children's welfare.
- Commissioners may not investigate courts and tribunals.

== History ==
The Children's Commissioner Act was repealed by the Children and Young People's Commission Act 2022, which received royal assent on 29 August 2022. The new legislation replaced the Children's Commissioner with the Children and Young People's Commission.
