= Children's Commissioner (New Zealand) =

Independent New Zealand Crown entity

Logo as of August 2025

Mana Mokopuna - Children's Commissioner is an independent New Zealand Crown entity that was established by the Children's Commissioner Act 2003, and reestablished by the Oversight of Oranga Tamariki System Legislation Amendment Act 2025. It serves as the Children's Ombudsman, provides advice and guidance to the government and other agencies, ensures that children's voices are heard in the public policy process and monitors places where children and young people are detained. The Children's Commissioner is the successor to the Children's Commissioners established in 1989 and the former Children and Young People's Commission.

== Functions and responsibilities ==
The Children's Commissioner is regulated by the Oversight of Oranga Tamariki System Legislation Amendment Act 2025. The Oversight Legislation Amendment Act designates the Children's Commissioner as an independent Crown entity under the Crown Entities Act 2004. Commissioners are required to have knowledge and experience of children and young people's issues, the Treaty of Waitangi, Māori knowledge, tikanga Māori, and the required skills and leadership expertise associated with the role. Commissioners are appointed by the Minister for Children and vetted by a nominations panel. The Oversight Legislation Amendment Act also allows the Governor-General of New Zealand to appoint a Deputy Commissioner at the recommendation of the Minister.

Key functions and responsibilities include advocating for children's rights, advising the government and agencies, advocating for system-level changes, ensuring that children's voices are heard in the public policy process and monitoring places where young people are detained. As part of the Oranga Tamariki (Ministry for Children) oversight system, the Children's Commissioner works with the Office of the Ombudsman and the Independent Children's Monitor to ensure that the various agencies and services working with children uphold children's rights and support their well-being. The Children's Commissioner's partners include Oranga Tamariki, the New Zealand Police, various health and educational organisations, Māori iwi (tribes), hapu (sub-groups), social services, and various non-governmental organisations (NGOs) working with children and young people.

Prior to the passage of the Children and Young People's Commission Act 2022, the Children's Commissioner was regulated by the now repealed Children's Commissioner Act 2003, the Oranga Tamariki Act 1989 (formerly known as the Children, Young Persons, and Their Families Act 1989), the Oranga Tamariki (Residential Care) Regulations 1996, the Crimes of Torture Act 1989, and the Human Assisted Reproductive Technology Act 2004. The Children's Commissioner is also the successor to the former Children and Young People's Commission, which operated from 2022 to 2025.

== History ==
Logo from 2017 to 2022

Prior to 2003, the Children's Commissioner was known as the Commissioner for Children, a position established under Part 9 of the Oranga Tamariki Act 1989 (then known as the Children, Young Persons, and Their Families Act 1989). Following the passage of the Children's Commissioner Act 2003, the Children's Commissioner assumed the functions and responsibilities of the Commissioner for Children.

Holders of the office have been of differing opinions on the controversy over the autopsy images of Ngatikaura Ngati.

=== Abolition ===
In November 2021, the Sixth Labour Government introduced legislation to replace the Children's Commissioner with two new entities: the "Children and Young People's Commission" that would focus on advocacy and an Independent Children's Monitor who would assume the Commissioner's monitoring responsibilities. In addition, the Ombudsman's Office would also expand its portfolio to investigating complaints relating to children. The proposed law change was driven by the Government's concern that the Office of the Children's Commissioner's advocacy role would clash with its monitoring role.

The Labour Government's plans to replace the Children's Commissioner attracted criticism from the Children's Commissioner Frances Eivers, several children's advocates including Save the Children, former Oranga Tamariki employee Luke Fitzmaurice, "VOYCE – Whakarongo Mai" spokesperson Tupua Urlich, children's advocate Piwi Beard, Manaaki Rangatahi, Barnardos and the Child Poverty Action Group (CPAG). They expressed concerns that the Government's changes would reduce the office's ability to monitor the wellbeing of vulnerable children and advocate for their interests. In addition, the Government's changes were opposed by its support partner, the Green Party, and the opposition National, ACT, and Māori parties.

Despite vocal civil society and political opposition, the Labour Party was able to use its parliamentary majority to push through two new laws replacing the Children's Commissioner with the Children and Young People's Commission and splitting oversight of the Oranga Tamariki system between the new Independent Monitor and Office of the Ombudsman.

On 1 July 2023, the Children's Commissioner was dissolved and formally replaced by the Children and Young People's Commission. The last Commissioner Frances Eivers subsequently served as the first Chief Children's Commissioner in the new organisation until 31 October 2023.

=== 2025 reinstatement ===
On 26 June 2025, the Sixth National Government passed the Oversight of Oranga Tamariki System Legislation Amendment Act 2025, which disestablished the Children and Young People's Commission and reinstated the Children's Commissioner. The legislation came into effect in 1 August, with Claire Achmad serving as the sole Children's Commissioner in the reinstated office.

On 8 July 2026, Minister of Social Development and Employment Louise Upston designated former detective, solicitor and Child Matters charity CEO Jane Searle as the new Children's Commissioner, effective 1 August 2026. According to The New Zealand Herald, Claire Achmad had reapplied for the position but the New Zealand Government had decided not to reappoint her, effectively reducing her term by 2.5 years. In response, several children's charities organised a petition calling on the Government to retain Achmad as Children's Commissioner.

== List of office holders ==
	Name	Portrait	Term of office	Notes
1	Ian Hassall		1989–1994	
2	Laurie O'Reilly		1994–1998	
3	Roger McClay		1998–2003	
4	Cindy Kiro		1 September 2003 – 1 September 2008	
5	John Angus		April 2009 – June 2011	
6	Russell Wills		1 July 2011 – 30 June 2016	
7	Andrew Becroft		1 July 2016 – 1 November 2021	
8	Frances Eivers		1 November 2021 – 31 October 2023	
9	Claire Achmad		1 November 2023 — 31 July 2026	
10	Jane Searle		1 August 2026 — present	
