= Child, Youth and Family (New Zealand) =

New Zealand government agency for children, young people and families

Child, Youth and Family Te Tari Āwhina i te Tamaiti, te Rangatahi, tae atu ki te Whānau
- Logo of Child, Youth and Family

Agency overview
- Formed: 1999
- Dissolved: 2017
- Superseding agency: Oranga Tamariki – Ministry for Children
- Jurisdiction: New Zealand
- Parent agency: New Zealand Ministry of Social Development
- Website: http://www.cyf.govt.nz/

Child, Youth and Family (CYF; in Māori, Te Tari Awhina i te Tamaiti, te Rangatahi, tae atu ki te Whānau), was the government agency that had legal powers to intervene to protect and help children who are being abused or neglected or who have problem behaviour until it was replaced by a new Ministry for Vulnerable Children in April 2017. CYF worked with the Police and the Courts in dealing with young offenders under the youth justice system. It provided residential and care services for children in need of care and protection and for young offenders. CYF assessed people who wished to adopt children and it reported to the Family Court on adoption applications. CYF facilitated the exchange of identifying information for parties to past adoptions. The agency also funded community organisations working with children, young people and their families to support the community's role in protecting and helping children.

== History ==
Child, Youth and Family had its origins in the Child Welfare Division of the Department of Education. On 1 April 1972, the division was merged with the Social Security Department to form the Department of Social Welfare. That department was reorganised on 1 May 1992 into business units, including the New Zealand Children and Young Persons Service (CYPS), which was subsequently renamed the Children, Young Persons and their Families Agency (CYPFA), to align its name with the legislation it was administering. On 1 October 1999 it was established as a separate Department of Child, Youth and Family Services (CYFS). Then, on 1 July 2006, it was amalgamated back into the Ministry of Social Development as a business unit under the name Child, Youth and Family (CYF).

Child, Youth and Family became a functional unit of the Ministry of Social Development (MSD), following the 2006 merger of the Department of Child, Youth and Family Services (CYFS) and MSD. Until April 2017, CYF fell under the portfolio of the Minister for Social Development. In April 2017, after the passage of enacting legislation, CYF was replaced by the Ministry for Vulnerable Children (now Oranga Tamariki – Ministry for Children).

== Legislation ==
MSD administered, or was involved in administering, the following CYF-related legislation:

- Adoption Act 1955,
- Adult Adoption Information Act 1985,
- Adoption (Intercountry) Act 1997,
- Care of Children Act 2004,
- Children, Young Persons, and Their Families Act 1989,
- Disabled Persons Community Welfare Act 1975,
- Protection of Personal and Property Rights Act 1988.

== Responsibilities ==
Protecting children and young people who were at risk of or who had been abused or neglected, or who were at risk of offending, was the service's primary responsibility, and it carried out investigations when a child or young person was believed to be "at risk". Where there was a risk of serious harm, it could exercise powers to ensure that the child was kept safe from that risk. The department also dealt with youth justice, a section of the law that dealt mainly with offending by young people aged 14–16 years, and adoption through the Adoption Information and Services Unit (AISU).

In addition, the department provided residential and care services for children and young people who required placing away from their parents, guardians or usual caregivers, and funded a wide range of community-based social services, with a focus on children, young people and families in need of support.

== CYFS Watch blog ==
In January 2007, a controversial blog "CYFS Watch" appeared on Google's Blogger. The blog's stated aim was unveiling examples of alleged incompetence by the Child Youth and Family Service and published the personal details of several CYFS social workers. The Ministry responded by complaining to Google. In late February, the blog's anonymous author made death threats towards Green MP Sue Bradford as a result of her Crimes (Abolition of Force as a Justification for Child Discipline) Amendment Bill 2005. Google responded on 22 February 2007 by deleting the site as a breach of their terms of service.
