= Autopsy images of Ngatikaura Ngati =

2007 image distribution in New Zealand

Ngatikaura Ngati was a New Zealand toddler of Tongan descent who died of child abuse in January 2006. After the conclusion of the trial of Ngati's killers, a judge ordered the release of the coroner's autopsy photographs of the child, for the purpose of encouraging the public to report other instances of abuse. TVNZ 1 broadcast the images, and they subsequently appeared on the Internet, sparking a debate about the balance between promoting awareness of child abuse, and maintaining dignity and respect for the deceased child.

== Death ==
Ngati was fostered by a cousin of Maine Annabella Ngati, his biological mother, in a Tongan language environment. Shortly after his third birthday, he was returned to his birth mother at her request. She, her partner Teusila Fa'asisila, and their other children only spoke English. Within three months, Ngati was dead. Photos taken during the autopsy showed bruises from repeated beatings and weeping sores, one of which was "the size of a man's hand on his bottom." Ngati's mother and Fa'asisila were found not guilty of murder, but guilty of manslaughter, failing to provide a child with the necessities of life (medical care), and willful ill treatment of a child. In June 2007, both were sentenced to eight and a half years in prison, with a minimum non-parole period of four years and eight months. Ngati's mother gave birth to another child while in custody, which was placed with either foster or adoptive parents. She was declined parole in November 2011. Fa'asisila was expected to be deported to Tonga upon his release in December 2011.

== Distribution of the images ==
[It is] questionable whether publication of autopsy photographs of a young child beaten to death could ever be in the public interest.

— Cindy Kiro, Children's Commissioner, March 2008

After trial, in an unusual and controversial move, Auckland High Court Judge Graham Lang allowed the release of the autopsy photos into the public realm, and allowed TVNZ's TV One to film the autopsy photographs "so that they may give pause to those people who choose to ignore that their family members are being hurt". Since then, the images have been distributed through television, email, and web, fueling controversy and debate along the way.

=== Broadcast television ===
TVNZ broadcast the images during a television news programme at 6pm on 6 August 2007. During that segment, Children's Commissioner Cindy Kiro is shown commenting that the public did not need to see these "graphic images to show them how badly damaged this child was." After the broadcast, she lodged a complaint with the Broadcasting Standards Authority (BSA), arguing that "[One News] had displayed a disregard for the rights of the young victim and exploitation of him by showing these photos". Calling the broadcast a "further abuse in death" of the child, Kiro said that it was "... questionable whether publication of autopsy photographs of a young child beaten to death could ever be in the public interest." Her complaint alleged violations of several of the BSA's standards, including "good taste and decency", "privacy", "fairness", "children's interests", and "violence".

[The Authority] recognises that news programmes will often contain "violent, disturbing or alarming material", and that broadcasters "should not falsify by omission, a world in which much violence and brutality occurs".

— Broadcasting Standards Authority, March 2008

The complaint was investigated, but was "not upheld" on all counts. With respect to "good taste and decency" the BSA acknowledged that "the autopsy images would have been distressing to some viewers. However, they conveyed the grim reality of child abuse in the context of [a news] item...." They ruled that their privacy and fairness standards did not apply to deceased individuals – they did point out, however, that TVNZ complied with the judge's stipulations against showing the boy's face and genitals, and, "in this respect, the Authority finds that TVNZ exercised care and discretion in order to preserve the child's dignity."

The more the public of New Zealand is aware of the problem, the more chance something will be done.

— Roger McClay, Preceding Children's Commissioner, August 2007

Regarding violence, the Authority quoted from their guidelines, which "recognises that news programmes will often contain 'violent, disturbing, or alarming material', and that broadcasters 'should not falsify by omission, a world in which much violence and brutality occurs'". TVNZ provided advance warning to viewers, and didn't display the images until two minutes into the story played a role in the BSA's decision-making, especially with respect to children's interests. Although the complaints were not upheld, two of the Authority's members went on record to note that "it is unusual to see autopsy photographs in the 6pm news, particularly involving children", and that "the warning could have made a specific reference to autopsy photographs of a child, in order to leave viewers in no doubt as to the content of the report."

=== Email petition ===
The images were also circulated in an email sent by a protest group calling for tougher jail terms for child abusers, with Kiro calling their use "abhorrent". Ngati's name (but not images) were used by Family First to advocate tougher sentences for child abuse, and to highlight female family violence perpetrators. Family First's Bob McCroskie supported the shock value of the images. The images have also been used on placards (protest signs).

Preceding Commissioner Roger McClay said, that use of the photos would serve to raise awareness of the child abuse "epidemic", which was not well known amongst New Zealanders. He added, "The more the public of New Zealand is aware of the problem, the more chance something will be done." Inspector Richard Middleton, who was involved in the original police case, said, "The case was very disturbing in view of the amount of violence used against a defenceless three-year-old. Anything that raises awareness and prevents it happening again is great."

=== Shock web sites ===
Some time later, the photos appeared on Internet shock sites; some sites are characterized as pornographic. In 2011, months after taking office as Children's Commissioner, Russell Wills said he was "appalled" at their use.

== Court documents ==
- R v Ngati HC Auckland CRI-2006-092-01919 2007 NZHC 1727 (8 May 2007)
- R v Ngati HC Auckland CRI-2006-092-001919 2007 NZHC 1850 (15 June 2007)
- TVNZ and Kiro - One News - Autopsy photos of child - Good taste and decency, privacy, fairness, programme classification, children's interests, and violence - Not upheld. - 2007-111 2008 NZBSA 25 (26 March 2008)
- Fa'asisila v Minister of Immigration 2011 NZIPT 500158 (9 December 2011)

== See also ==
- Child poverty in New Zealand
