= Children's Commissioner Act 2022 =

Act of Parliament in New Zealand

Children's Commissioner Act 2022 Children and Young People's Commission Act 2022

New Zealand Parliament
- Royal assent: 29 August 2022

Legislative history
- Introduced by: Carmel Sepuloni
- First reading: 16 November 2021
- Second reading: 27 July 2022
- Third reading: 23 August 2022
- Passed: 23 August 2022
- Status: Amended

The Children's Commissioner Act 2022 (titled the Children and Young People's Commission Act 2022 prior to 5 August 2025) is a New Zealand Act of Parliament that established the Children and Young People's Commission (CYPC) and repealed the Children's Commissioner Act 2003. The Bill was formerly part of the proposed "Oversight of the Oranga Tamariki System and Children and Young People's Commission Bill" until it was split into two separate pieces of legislation by the New Zealand Parliament on 11 August 2022. Together, the bill and the companion Oversight of Oranga Tamariki System Act 2022 replaced the Children's Commissioner, the independent national Children's ombudsman.

In August 2025, the law's title and provisions were amended following the passage of the Oversight of Oranga Tamariki System Legislation Amendment Act 2025, which reestablished the Children's Commissioner and dissolved the CYPC.

== Key provisions ==
=== Former provisions ===
The Children and Young People's Commission Act 2022's key provisions included:

- Establishing the Children and Young People's Commission, (known as Mana Mokopuna) which consists of a fulltime Chief Children's Commissioner and a maximum of five board members.
- Board members must have experience and knowledge of children's rights and issues, the Treaty of Waitangi.
- Half of the board members must have knowledge of Mātauranga Māori (Māori indigenous knowledge) and Tikanga Māori Māori culture.
- Members of the Commission must be appointed by a nomination panel.
- Established the Commission as an independent entity.
- Clarified the Commission's functions, duties and powers for protecting the interests and well-being of young children.
- Required the Commission to have a code of ethics governing its engagement with children and young people.
- Repealed the Children's Commissioner Act 2003 and other relevant legislation to remove references to it.
- The Children and Young People's Commission assumed the functions and responsibilities of the former Children's Commissioner including upholding the United Nations Convention on the Rights of the Child.

=== 2025 amendment ===
Following the passage of the Oversight of Oranga Tamariki System Legislation Amendment Act 2025 in August 2025, references to the Children and Young People's Commission were replaced by new sections outlining the duties, powers and responsibilities of the reconstituted Children's Commissioner.

== History ==
=== Combined bill ===
In November 2021, the Sixth Labour Government introduced the "Oversight of the Oranga Tamariki System and Children and Young People's Commission Bill" which proposed replacing the Children's Commissioner with two new entities: a "Children and Young People's Commission" focusing on advocacy work and an Independent Children's Monitor within the Education Review Office focusing on monitoring. This bill was developed by the Minister of Social Development Carmel Sepuloni based on advice from Ministry for Social Development (MSD) officials. The proposed law change was driven by the Government's concern that the Children's Commissioner's advocacy role would clash with its monitoring role.

The Government's Oranga Tamariki Oversight Bill passed its first reading on 16 November 2021 by a margin of 108 to 12 votes. While the ruling Labour Party, opposition National Party, and the ACT Party supported the bill, it was opposed by the Green Party and the Māori Party. The bill was subsequently referred to the Social Services and Community select committee.

By 26 January 2022, the select committee had received 403 submissions from interested groups and individuals; with 311 opposing the bill and eight supporting the bill. While Labour supported the Oranga Tamariki System Oversight Bill, the National, ACT, and Green parties objected to the bill, citing the large number of opposing submissions and urging the Government to wait until the Royal Commission of Inquiry into Abuse in Care had concluded its hearings. In June 2022, the select committee recommended the bill but made several recommendations including incorporating references to the Treaty of Waitangi, defining "care or custody providers," strengthening the independent monitor's role, and creating the position of Chief Children's Commissioner to head the Children and Young People's Commission. In response, Children's Commissioner Judge Frances Eivers criticised the select committee for proceeding with the legislation without waiting for the Royal Commission to conclude its hearings.

On 27 July 2022, the Oranga Tamariki Oversight Bill passed its second reading by a margin of 65 to 54. While Labour supported the legislation, it was opposed by the National, Green, ACT, and Māori parties.

=== Separate legislation ===
Following the "committee of the whole House" meeting held on 11 August, the legislation was split into two bills; namely the Children and Young People's Commission Act 2022 and the Oversight of Oranga Tamariki System Act 2022. On 23 August, these two bills passed their third combined reading. While the Labour Party supported the bills, they were opposed by the National, ACT, Green and Māori parties. In addition, Eivers, several children's advocates including Child Matters, Save the Children, and Social Justice Aotearoa, and the human rights organisations Amnesty International and the Human Rights Commission voiced opposition to the Government's reforms of the Oranga Tamariki oversight system.

=== Amendments ===
On 26 June 2025, the Sixth National Government passed legislation designating the Independent Children's Monitor as a stand-alone independent Crown entity, disestablishing the Children and Young People's Commission and reinstating the Children's Commissioner; effective 1 August 2025. On 1 August 2025, the act's title and provisions were amended by Section 17 of the Oversight of Oranga Tamariki System Legislation Amendment Act 2025.
