= Karen Chhour =

New Zealand politician

The Honourable Karen Chhour MP
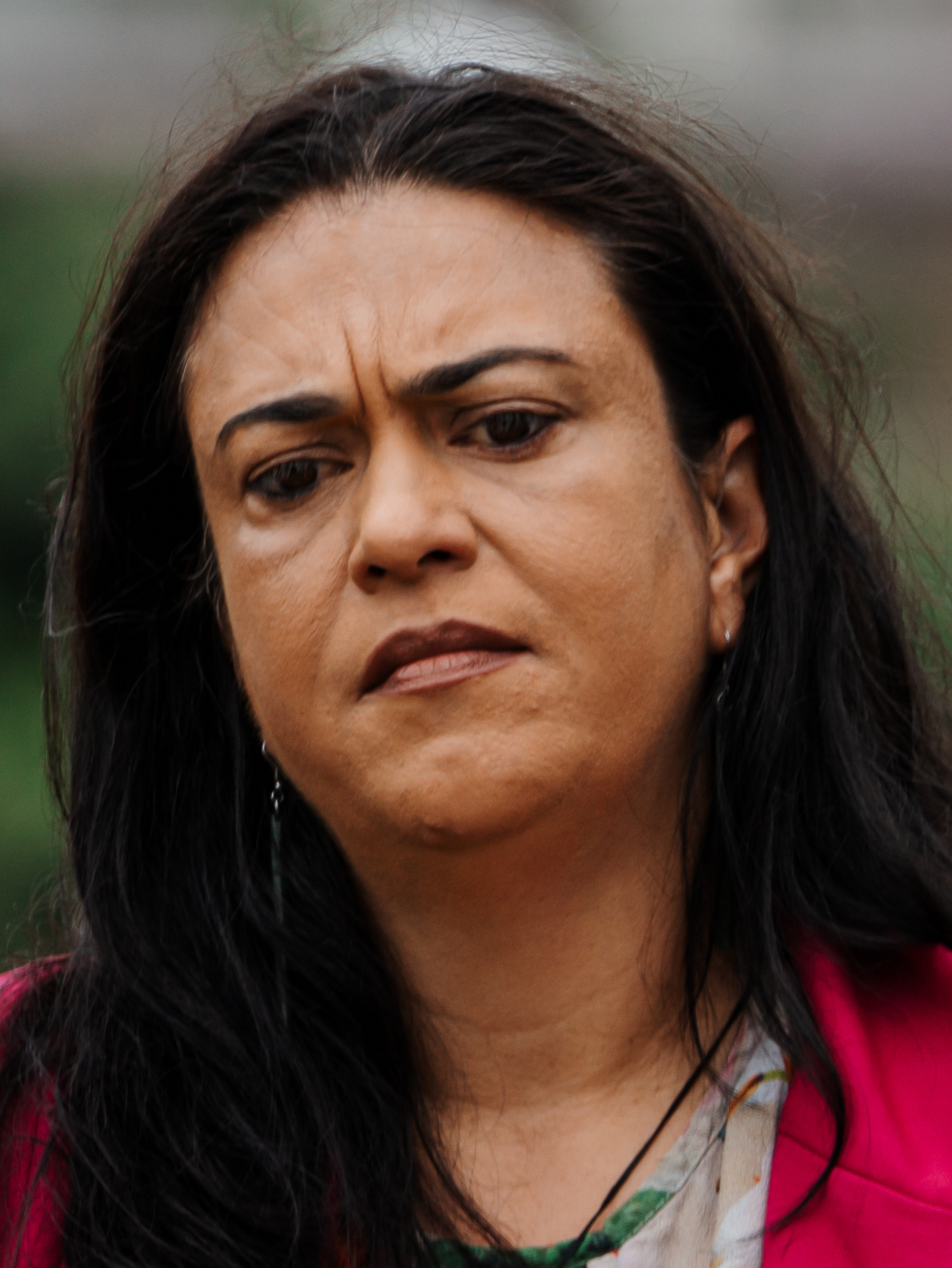
- Chhour in 2023

4th Minister for Children
- Incumbent
- Assumed office 27 November 2023
- Prime Minister: Christopher Luxon
- Preceded by: Kelvin Davis

2nd Minister for the Prevention of Family and Sexual Violence
- Incumbent
- Assumed office 27 November 2023
- Prime Minister: Christopher Luxon
- Preceded by: Marama Davidson

Member of the New Zealand Parliament for ACT party list
- Incumbent
- Assumed office 17 October 2020

Personal details
- Born: 1980 or 1981 (age 45–46) Australia
- Party: ACT
- Spouse: Menglin Chhour
- Children: 4

Karen Louise Chhour (born 1980 or 1981) is a New Zealand politician. She has been a member of parliament for ACT New Zealand since the 2020 general election.

== Early life and career ==
Chhour is of Māori descent and belongs to the Ngāpuhi iwi. She was born in Australia and moved to New Zealand as a baby, first living with her grandparents in Kaeo before moving back in with her mother on the North Shore at the age of 5. She regularly ran away from home and ended up in foster care, which she states as a reason for her interest in addressing homelessness and child poverty. She worked in property management prior to becoming involved in politics.

== First term, 2020–2023 ==
New Zealand Parliament
Years	Term	Electorate	List	Party
2020–2023	53rd	List	7	ACT
2023–2026	54th	List	6	ACT
2026–present	55th	List	5	ACT

In the 2020 general election, Chhour was placed seventh on the ACT party list and ran for the electorate of Upper Harbour. Chhour came fourth in Upper Harbour. However, ACT won 8% of the party vote, which entitled it to 10 MPs including Chhour. In her first term, Chhour was ACT's spokesperson for social development, children, and child poverty reduction.

In early December 2021, Chhour criticised the Labour Government's plans to introduce legislation under its Smokefree 2025 programme that would ban anyone under the age of 14 from legally purchasing tobacco for the rest of their lives. Older generations will only be permitted to buy tobacco products with very low-levels of nicotine while fewer shops will be allowed to sell tobacco products. Chhour argued that prohibition was unworkable and that the new law would create a black market for tobacco products.

On 28 September 2022, Chhour in her capacity as ACT's children spokesperson questioned the Minister of Children Kelvin Davis about the relationship between Oranga Tamariki (the Ministry for Children) and the Māori group Te Whānau o Waipareira Trust, which was being investigated for financing Māori Party candidate John Tamihere's campaign during the 2020 New Zealand general election. In response, Davis had made a statement telling Chhour to "enter the Māori world and stop looking at the world through a "vanilla lens." Chhour, who is Māori, was offended by his remarks, stating that Davis had taken away her mana. In response, ACT Party leader David Seymour described Davis' comments as "nasty" and "totally racist." The following day, Davis contacted Chhour and apologised for his remarks. Chhour accepted his apology. That same week, Chhour had introduced a member's bill that proposed repealing Section 7AA of the Oranga Tamariki Act 1989, which requires Oranga Tamariki's chief executive to recognise and commit to the principles of the Treaty of Waitangi.

== Second term, 2023–2026 ==
Chhour stood for re-election at the 2023 general election. She finished fourth in the Upper Harbour electorate but was returned for a second term as a list MP.

In late November 2023, Chhour assumed the positions of Minister for Children and Minister for the prevention of Family and Sexual Violence in the Sixth National Government.

=== Section 7AA law change ===
On 30 November 2023 Chhour, as Children's Minister, defended the Government's plans to repeal Section 7AA of the Oranga Tamariki Act 1989, which requires Oranga Tamariki (Ministry for Children) to ensure that Māori babies who are uplifted from unsafe homes remain in the care of their wider family (whānau). She argued that focusing on race detracted from the ministry's primary focus of protecting "at-risk" children.

In mid April 2024, the Waitangi Tribunal summoned Chhour to provide evidence at an urgent inquiry into the repeal of Section 7AA of the Oranga Tamariki Act. The Tribunal asked the Minister to answer several questions including how many caregivers working with the Ministry had raised concern over the impact of Section 7AA and to provide specific examples of children being placed into unsafe conditions because of Section 7AA. In response, Crown lawyers filed judicial proceedings in the High Court seeking to block the Tribunal's summons. ACT leader Seymour criticised the Waitangi Tribunal's summons, saying that "they're buying a fight with someone with much greater mana." On 24 April, the High Court overturned the Waitangi Tribunal's subpoena to Chhour. In response, Treaty rights activist and lawyer Annette Sykes announced that she would appeal the High Court's decision. Crown Law has indicated Chhour plans to introduce her bill to repeal Section 7AA of the Oranga Tamariki Act in mid-May. Once Parliament has the bill, the Tribunal must cease its investigation into the issue. On 29 April, the Tribunal released an interim report claiming that the proposed repeal of Section 7AA would harm vulnerable children. The Tribunal is expected to release its report by 12 May 2024.

On 13 May 2024, the New Zealand Court of Appeal ruled in favour of the Waitangi Tribunal and overturned the High Court ruling against Chhour's summons. That same day, the Government's Oranga Tamariki (Repeal of Section 7AA) Amendment Bill was introduced into Parliament. On 3 April 2025, the Government's legislation repealing Section 7AA passed its third reading with the support of the governing coalition parties, becoming law. Chhour said she was proud to lead the bill into the final stage in the House and welcomed its repeal, saying that Section 7AA was "well-intended but it resulted in children being put second."

=== Youth justice ===
In early March 2024 Chhour announced that Government would be launching a pilot military-style academy for serious youth offenders in mid 2024. The boot camp pilot would be run by Oranga Tamariki and have a rehabilitative and trauma-informed care approach as well as a military component. The Government's boot camp programme was criticised by Green Party co-leader Marama Davidson, Te Pāti Māori co-leader Rawiri Waititi, IHC director of advocacy Tania Thomas, Professor Joanna Kidman, Auckland youth development worker Aaron Hendry and human rights law firm Cooper Legal, who argued that boot camps did not address the causes of crime and would have an adverse impact on disadvantaged children and young people, particularly Māori and the intellectually disabled. In response to criticism, Chhour argued that boot camps were needed to show young offenders "there were consequences for their actions but they could benefit from a chance to turn their lives around." Retail NZ issued a statement expressing cautious support in light of high retail crime in New Zealand.

On 23 June 2024, Chhour confirmed that the Government was working to introduce a Youth Serious Offender (YSO) declaration as part of its goal of reducing serious youth reoffending by 15 percent. The YSO declaration would give Police and youth courts greater powers including sending serious youth offenders to a military-style academy, expanded use of electronic and judicial monitoring and allowing Police to arrest youth offenders for not complying with bail conditions and other court orders. Young persons that would be covered under the Youth Serious Offender category include those aged between 14 and 17 years at the time of their offending, have had two serious offenses punishable by a ten-year prison sentence proven in court, and have been assessed as likely to reoffend or have failed to respond to intervention programs.

On 20 July 2024, Chhour and Acting Prime Minister David Seymour unveiled the Government's boot camp pilot to the media, who were given a tour of its facilities.

On 22 November 2024, Chhour announced the creation of a new Child Protection Investigation Unit, staffed by independent experts, to investigate cases of harm in state care. Janis Adair, the Chief Inspector of New Zealand's prisons, was appointed to initially lead the unit. In response, the New Zealand Police expressed concern that the new investigation unit could reduce their independence while Chief Children's Commissioner Claire Achmad expressed hope that the unit could ensure better safety for children and young people in the care of Oranga Tamariki.

In August 2025, Oranga Tamariki acknowledged that seven out of the ten participants in the pilot boot camp had reoffended. In response, Chhour said that "zero re-offending was never going to be realistic" but claimed that "we have seen marked improvements in these young people's behaviour, attitudes to offending, and activities." These participants included a youth who was charged in November 2024 with reoffending five weeks after graduating from the boot camp phase, a second participant who died in a motor accident while fleeing police, and two more participants who had absconded from Oranga Tamariki custody while attending a tangihanga (funeral). Despite these reoffending issues, the National-led coalition government allocated NZ$33 million from the 2025 New Zealand budget to establishing youth boot camps and another $16 million to setting up the Youth Serious Offender category, which provides the framework for sending serious youth offenders to boot camps.

By early March 2026, the Government had launched its second military-style academy and was progressing legislation allowing Youth Court judges to send youth offenders to boot camps. On 17 September 2026, the Government's Oranga Tamariki (Responding to Serious Youth Offending) legislation passed its third reading, becoming law. As the bill's sponsor, Chhour said it "will help create less victims and make our communities safer."

=== Parliamentary work culture ===
During an interview with ThreeNews in early August 2024, Chhour said she faced bullying and an "unsafe work environment" at Parliament due to her ministerial responsibility for the Government's contentious Section 7AA repeal and boot camp policies. In May 2024, Chhour had been the target of Te Pāti Māori (TPM) social media statements attributing her alleged disconnection from Māori culture and family to her uplifting as a child and TPM MP Mariameno Kapa-Kingi's remarks denouncing her as a puppet of the ACT party. Chhour and ACT whip Todd Stephenson had complained about these comments to Speaker Gerry Brownlee. Though Brownlee indicated that he would seek an apology from Kapa-Kingi, this was contradicted by Te Pāti Māori. Chhour expressed dissatisfaction with the lack of follow up to her complaint. In response to the alleged bullying of Chhour, ACT leader Seymour had accused Brownlee of "greenlighting" racial harassment for not pressing TPM on apologising to Chhour and said he was beginning to lose confidence in Brownlee's role as Speaker. ACT MPs had also refused to remove their party-branded lapel pins in protest of Brownlee's handling of Chhour's complaints. In response to the controversy, Labour and Green MPs Chris Hipkins, Kelvin Davis and Ricardo Menéndez March said that all MPs had the right to feel safe at Parliament but defended the right of opposition politicians to criticise Chhour's role in rolling out "controversial" and "harmful" government policies.

== Third term, 2026–present ==
During the 2026 New Zealand general election, Chhour was ranked fifth on the ACT a party list and contested the North Shore electorate. On 7 November, Chhour came fourth place in the North Shore race with 1,747 votes based on preliminary results. She was re-elected to Parliament on the ACT party list.

== Personal life ==
Chhour lives on the North Shore. She met her husband Menglin, a Cambodian refugee, in intermediate school. They lost touch when she moved schools, but reconnected when she was 16, working at McDonald's after dropping out of high school. They have four children together.

In 2020, Chhour reconnected with her long-lost Australian father and discovered she has two sisters.
