= Oranga Tamariki =

New Zealand government department

- Ministry for Children (English)

Agency overview
- Formed: 2017
- Preceding agency: Child, Youth and Family (CYF)
- Jurisdiction: New Zealand
- Annual budget: Vote Oranga Tamariki; Total budget for 2019/20 ▲$1,198,615,000
- Ministers responsible: Hon Karen Chhour, Minister for Children; Hon Louise Upston, Minister for Child Poverty Reduction
- Agency executive: Vacant, Chief Executive
- Website: www.orangatamariki.govt.nz

Oranga Tamariki (OT), also known as the Ministry for Children and previously the Ministry for Vulnerable Children, is a government department in New Zealand responsible for the well-being of children, specifically children at risk of harm, youth offenders and children of the State. It is the successor agency of the former department, Child, Youth and Family (CYF).

== Functions and structure ==
The minister responsible for Oranga Tamariki is the Minister for Children, a position currently held by Karen Chhour. On 31 October 2017, it was announced that the ministry would be renamed to Oranga Tamariki — Ministry for Children. Oranga Tamariki is guided by the United Nations Convention on the Rights of the Child.

The organisation is headed by a chief executive and consists of three major clusters: "Service Delivery", "Voices and Quality", and "Enabling Functions." Services Delivery consists of a "Partnering for Outcomes" group, two "Services for Children and Families" groups (one in the North Island and one in the South Island), a "Youth Justice Services" group, and a "Care Services" group. The "Voices and Quality" cluster consists of a Tamariki Advocate/Voices of Children group and a Chief Social Worker/Professional Practice group. The "Enabling Functions" cluster consists of the "Policy, Investment and Evidence" group and a "Leadership and Organisational Development group." Each of these groups is headed by a deputy chief executive.

Under the Oversight of Oranga Tamariki System Legislation Amendment Act 2025, an independent Crown entity known as the Independent Children's Monitor has oversight over the Oranga Tamariki child welfare system. The Monitor is supported by a three-member board including a judge. The Children's Commissioner also has oversight over children and young people under the care of Oranga Tamariki. This legislation supersedes two previous laws which replaced the Children's Commissioner with a Children and Young People's Commission.

=== Youth justice facilities ===
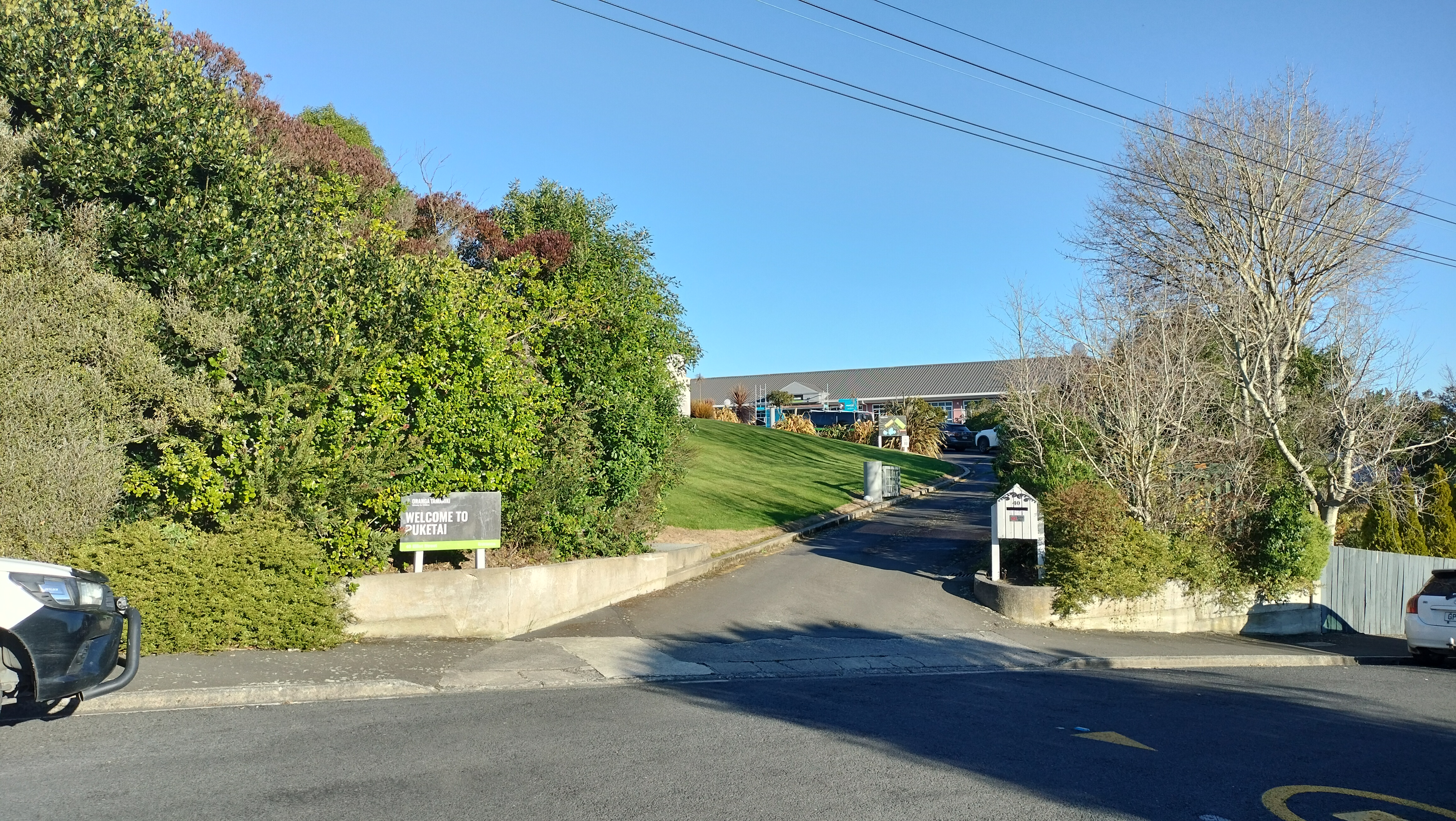
Oranga Tamariki's Puketai youth justice facility in Anderson's Bay, Dunedin

Oranga Tamariki also operates five youth justice residences: Korowai Manaaki and Whakatakapokai in South Auckland, Te Maioha o Parekarangi in Rotorua, Te Au rere a te Tonga in Palmerston North, and Te Puna Wai ō Tuhinapo in Rolleston. These facilities serve as both homes and remand centres for youth offenders who have been referred there by the Youth Court system. Residents consist of teenagers aged 17 years and under as well as 18-year old youths. These include youth offenders facing serious criminal charges including murder, rape, aggravated robbery, and gang connections. Residents at youth justice residences receive education, life skills training, and treatment programmes for anger, drugs, and alcohol.

As of March 2024, Oranga Tamariki operates three care and protection facilities: Epuni residence in Wellington, the Puketai residence in Dunedin and a "hub" in South Auckland called Kahui Whetū. These care and protection residences are for delinquent children and young people aged between 12 and 16 years. In addition, Oranga Tamariki runs three Youth Justice Community Homes or remand homes: Hillcrest Home in Hamilton, Te Kohanga in Rotorua, and Te Whare Awhi in Palmerston North. These exist alongside several community homes run by various social service providers including Youth Horizons Trust Kia Puāwai, Emerge Aotearoa, PACT and Te Tuinga Whānau Support Services Trust.

In early March 2024, the Minister for Children Karen Chhour confirmed that Oranga Tamariki would be running a military-style academy pilot from mid-2024. The military-style academy would target the most serious youth offenders and would have a rehabilitative and trauma-informed care approach. While the programme would be led by Oranga Tamariki, it would also liaise with other agencies and include a military component. The military-style academy pilot commenced at a Palmerston North youth justice facility on 29 July 2024 with ten teenage candidates. The one-year programme consisted of a three-month residential component focused on tackling criminal behaviour through education and rehabilitation and followed by a nine-month community reintegration component.

== Statistics ==
According to figures released by the Royal Commission of Inquiry into Abuse in Care in late July 2024, the number of children in state care had reached a peak of 1,974 in mid-2019 before dropping to 1,022 in 2022. By mid-2024, this figure had risen by 20% to 1,313.

== History ==
Oranga Tamariki is the successor organisation to the former Child, Youth and Family (CYF) department, which was dissolved down by the Fifth National Government in March 2017. Oranga Tamariki, initially known as the Ministry for Vulnerable Children, formally came into existence in November 2017. Following the formation of a Labour-led coalition government in October 2017, the Ministry for Vulnerable Children was renamed the Ministry for Children.

From May 2018 to June 2019, there were 39 reported physical assaults against the organisation's social workers.

In November 2019, Oranga Tamariki (with the Ministry of Education) investigated sex acts at a Catholic primary school in Wellington.

=== 2019 "Uplifting" controversy ===
On 11 June 2019, the news website Newsroom published a series of stories including a documentary called The Uplift criticising Oranga Tamariki's practice of "uplifting" or separating children from their parents. Newsroom argued that Oranga Tamariki's "uplifting" policies disproportionately targeted Māori and Pasifika children, claiming that three Māori babies were being "uplifted" from their mothers a week. According to Newsroom's report, 70% of children "uplifted" in 2018 came from Māori and Pasifika backgrounds.

This attracted considerable media coverage and public discussion. Former Māori Party leader Dame Tariana Turia demanded the resignation of Oranga Tamariki chief executive Grainne Moss. By contrast, former Families Commissioner Christine Rankin defended Oranga Tamariki's actions and criticised Newsroom for allegedly spinning it into a "race issue." Meanwhile, Christian advocacy group Family First New Zealand called for the Government to establish a fully independent watchdog for Oranga Tamariki.

On 12 June 2019, Oranga Tamariki pursued legal action against Newsroom, seeking orders for cuts to Newsroom's The Uplift story that it disputed. The agency also defended its practice of "uplifting" children, arguing that these actions were done to ensure the safety of children. On 13 June, the Family Court declined Oranga Tamariki's bid to force Newsroom and news website Stuff to change details to The Uplift story. In response to public interest, the Children's Minister Tracey Martin announced that she would meet with local iwi Ngāti Kahungunu and the Māori Council to defuse the situation. On 16 June, Martin announced that the Government would be conducting a review into Oranga Tamariki's attempted uplifting in the case of a Hawkes Bay mother and her child. The review will be led by the Chief Social Worker at Oranga Tamariki while a person appointed by Ngāti Kahungunu will provide independent oversight. On 18 June, Prime Minister Jacinda Ardern ruled out a royal commission of inquiry into Oranga Tamariki's practices.

On 22 August 2019, Oranga Tamariki signed an agreement with the North Island iwi Ngāi Tūhoe to ensure that fewer Māori children end up in state care. As part of the agreement, Oranga Tamariki will deal with at-risk Tūhoe children through its Whakatane office to ensure that children were moved from state care into family homes. Earlier in the year, Oranga Tamariki had signed similar partnership agreements with other Māori iwi including Waikato Tainui, Ngāi Tahu and Ngāpuhi.

In October 2019, it was reported that Oranga Tamariki was charging an Auckland dad $110 per hour to see his son. During that same month, Hawke's Bay parents refused to participate in a government review, claiming a lack of trust in the investigation.

Moss announced in January 2021 that she was "stepping down" from her position.

=== COVID-19 pandemic ===
During the COVID-19 pandemic in New Zealand, the Minister of Health, Chris Hipkins, issued a press statement in mid-August 2020 rejecting rumours circulating within the Māori and Pasifika communities that Oranga Tamariki was taking away children whose parents had tested positive for COVID-19.

=== Uplifting of "Moana" ===
In 2021, Oranga Tamariki was involved in a custody dispute over a Māori girl referred to as "Moana". The dispute was between Moana's Pākehā (New Zealand European) foster parents, "the Smiths", and Moana's iwi, Ngāti Kahungunu. The six year old Moana, who had experienced abuse and neglect at the hands of her birth mother, had been living with the Smiths for three years since 2018 in the Hawke's Bay region. The ministry and Ngāti Kahungunu wanted Moana to be placed with an elderly Māori woman known as "Mrs Taipa" and her daughter ("Ms Taipa") on the grounds that the Smiths could not meet her Māori cultural needs. On 9 September 2021, Judge Peter Callinicos dismissed Oranga Tamariki's application for Moana to be removed from the Smiths. He also criticised Oranga Tamariki for allegedly "putting ideology ahead of the child's best interests" and rejected their assertion that the Smiths were stripping Moana of her whakapapa (genealogy). Callinicos also criticised the ministry for not helping the Smiths to meet Moana's cultural needs and inaccurate statutory reports.

On 10 September, Moana's birth mother filed an appeal against Judge Callinicos's decision. Ngahiwi Tomoana, the head of Ngāti Kahungunu, who had supported the ministry's application, called for the decision to be appealed and claimed that uplifting separated Māori children from their families and communities. The mother's lawyer Janet Mason and Oranga Tamariki argued that Judge Callinicos had misapplied the statutory cultural provisions of the Oranga Tamariki Act 1989, had mischaracterised or overlooked evidence due to his alleged bias, and disregarded Moana's cultural and familial needs. On 9 November 2022, Wellington High Court Justice Helen Cull dismissed Moana's birth mother's appeal on all grounds and ruled that Moana could remain in the care of her Pākehā foster parents.

In early December 2022, Mason appealed the High Court's decision to the Supreme Court of New Zealand, arguing that the 2019 amendments to the Oranga Tamariki Act strengthened Treaty of Waitangi commitments.

On 20 March 2023, the Smiths relinquished custody of Moana, citing the stress caused by the ongoing legal battle for her care caused by the ongoing appeals, lack of support from Oranga Tamariki's Napier office, and numerous false reports of abuse. Mrs Smith described the decision as "heartbreaking" and stated that they were "still grieving the loss of our daughter in our home" and wanted Moana to be part of their family's lives. Oranga Tamariki's East Coast regional manager Julie Tangaere described Moana's case as "highly sensitive" and "distressing," but asserted that its involvement had been consistent with the implementation of the Court's plans. Former Assistant Māori Commissioner for Children Glenis Philip-Barbara stated that Māori children deserved to be both safe and with their whānau (family). In response, the ACT Party claimed that the parents had been bullied by Oranga Tamariki because of their race and advocated the repeal of Section 7AA of the Oranga Tamariki Act 1989.

In late July 2025, High Court justice Helen Cull ordered Oranga Tamariki to pay NZ$108,000 in indemnity costs to Moana's foster parents and criticised the Ministry's campaign against the parents. Oranga Tamariki's North Taranaki and Whanau Services national commissioner Alison Cronin said the Ministry would comply with the court ruling.

=== Malachi Subecz abuse case ===
In October 2022, the Chief Ombudsman Peter Boshier released a scathing report into Oranga Tamariki's handling of the case of five year old Tauranga child Malachi Subecz, who was murdered by his caregiver Michaela Barriball in November 2021. Barriball had been looking after the boy whose mother had been imprisoned. Boshier described the department's response as "a litany of failures" and criticised Oranga Tamariki for not prioritising Malachi's welfare. In late June 2022, Barriball had been sentenced to a life sentence of at least 17 years after pleading guilty to two charges of ill-treating a child and a murder charge. While In Barriball's care, Malachi had been beaten, starved, thrown against walls, and burnt with scalding water by his caregiver. Barriball's sister Sharon Barriball was also convicted of perverting the course of justice by concealing evidence and sentenced to six months home detention.

Malachi's relatives including his aunt Helen Menzies criticised Oranga Tamariki's handling of Malachi's case, stating that his death was preventable and that the government department had failed him. In mid October 2022, Oranga Tamariki acknowledged that it had failed to act on at least two reports by Malachi's stepfather and a Corrections Department probation officer expressing concerns about Malachi's wellbeing. The Minister for Children Kelvin Davis confirmed that Oranga Tamariki accepted the findings of the Ombudsman's report but delayed taking further action until a review of the Oranga Tamariki child care system had been completed. In response, the Māori Party co-leader Debbie Ngarewa-Packer criticised Davis' decision to delay action, stating that "a delayed approach meant atrocities were likely continuing." Ngarewara-Packer advocated implementing mandatory reporting as an interim measure.

In early December 2022, a second independent report by former health official Dame Karen Poutasi into Oranga Tamariki and other agencies' handling of the Malachi case was released. In addition to Oranga Tamariki, her investigation examined the responses of other government departments and agencies including the Corrections Department, Ministry of Education, Ministry of Health, Ministry of Social Development, and the New Zealand Police. Poutasi criticised these organisations for ignoring people who raised concerns about Malachi's wellbeing and failing to report or act upon signs of abuse. Poutasi made 14 recommendations including requiring Oranga Tamariki to vet proposed carers in the event a solo parent is taken into custody and requiring professionals and services working with children to report suspected abuse to Oranga Tamariki. Poutasi's report was welcomed by Malachi's parents as a vindication of their view that the child's death could have been prevented had Oranga Tamariki acted. Similar sentiments were expressed by Minister of Children Kelvin Davis. Stuff also reported that Oranga Tamariki's Tauranga office, which oversaw Subecz's case, experienced high workload pressures, a high number of unallocated cases, inadequate site capacity, and significant burnout and stress among staff members.

In early December 2022, Newshub reported that the Government had accepted 9 of Poutasi's 14 recommendations including comparing medical records to gain a full picture of a child's health and promoting regular public awareness campaigns dealing with child abuse. However, the Government stated that it would consider the five remaining recommendations including vetting the caregivers of imprisoned parents, regular follow-up checks and implementing the mandatory reporting of suspected abuses to Oranga Tamariki. Davis confirmed that three of the senior staff working on Subecz's case were no longer working with the agency. Two of the individuals had resigned while a third had been dismissed. In addition, Associate Education Minister Jan Tinetti confirmed that the early childhood centre Subecz attended had also lost its license in November 2022.

=== Issues at youth justice facilities ===
In July 2017, local residents objected to Oranga Tamariki's plans to establish a youth remand home in Dunedin's Abbotsford suburb.

Between June 2018 and June 2019, a total of 1463 complaints concerning physical, verbal or other staff misbehaviour were lodged by children and youths residing at Oranga Tamariki's Youth Justice and Care and Protection residences. 544 of these complaints were upheld following investigations.

In late June 2021, a whistleblower informed the news website Newsroom about incidents where Oranga Tamariki staff members allegedly physically assaulted children being housed at Oranga Tamariki's Care and Protection Residences. The report raised concerns about the welfare of children in their care along with the use of restraints and physical force. In response, Oranga Tamariki's acting chief executive Wira Gardiner confirmed that several staff had been suspended while the agency and Police investigated the incident. This investigation led to the closure of Christchurch Te Oranga care and protection residence in July 2021. In August 2021, the Children's Commissioner criticised conditions at the Puketai Care and Protection Residence and Will Street Whare. Issues at Puketai included long delays at securing placements for young residents, mistreatment by staff, and confinement. Issues at Will Street Whare included a lack of staff training and supervision, inadequate funding for provisions, the mixing of different categories of residents, lack of feedback opportunities from child residents, and a lack of a plan for incorporating tikanga Māori. On 22 June 2023, Children's Minister Kelvin Davis announced plans to shut down the remaining care and protect residences. As of March 2024, the Wellington, Dunedin and Auckland care and protection facilities remained open.

In July 2021, Newsroom reported that several whistleblowers had alleged that several Oranga Tamariki youth justice residences had a "boy's club" culture among staff, which tolerated violence and restraints against youth residents. The whistleblowers also alleged that residents were sometimes stripped searched and forced to wear suicide gowns. There were also allegations that some staff members were unqualified and included former Serco staff who had failed Corrections criteria, who had been hired due to their connections to staff at youth justice residences.

In late May 2023, The New Zealand Herald reported that Oranga Tamariki's youth justice residences faced several issues including staff shortages and turnovers, increased violence and threats from residents, and inadequate equipment including radios. The Herald also reported that staff faced frequent attacks with improvised weapons including sharpened toothbrushes and vape pen components. Unlike men's prisons in New Zealand, teenage residents can meet their families without obstruction and visitors cannot be searched under most circumstances. Between May 2022 and May 2023, several assaults were reported at the five residences: Te Puna Wai (64), Korowai Manaaki (46), Te Maioha (14), Te Au Rere (12) and Whakatakapokai (10). Between 2014 and 2015, the Rolleston-based Te Puna Wai facility reported 104 offenses and 60 serious assaults. In response to problems with Oranga Tamariki's youth residences, ACT party leader David Seymour proposed replacing them with youth detention centres run by the Department of Corrections.

On 8 February 2023, five teenagers attempted to escape the Te Puna Wai residence and climbed onto a roof in the complex. During their escape attempt, an Oranga Tamariki staff member was stabbed in the neck with an improvised weapon. In May 2023, several teenagers threatened a staff member at Te Puna Wai with an improvised shank before barricading themselves in the lounge and attacking staff. During the ensuing brawl, Oranga Tamariki staff were forced to use chairs as improvised shields to break up the fight, which resulted in moderate injuries.

On 21 June 2023, Oranga Tamariki removed two staff members from youth justice residences following allegations of "inappropriate sexual behaviour" involving five young people. In response to the abuse allegations, former Police Commissioner Mike Bush took charge of all Youth Justice residences and launched a review of all residences and community-based homes. Children's Minister Kelvin Davis described the alleged abuse incidents as unacceptable but praised Oranga Tamariki's chief executive's "swift and decisive response." He also confirmed that Oranga Tamariki was shifting from "care-and-protection residences" towards smaller community-based residences. On 24 June, Oranga Tamariki investigated a third staff member who was accused of inappropriate touching and sexual comments.

On 24 June 2023, five young people climbed onto the roof of a building in the Christchurch youth justice facility. An Oranga Tamariki staff member sustained a broken wrist during the incident. Following efforts by Oranga Tamariki and the Police to manage the "crisis," the four remaining youths vacated the roof cavity and were taken into Police custody.

On 1 July 2023, six young people climbed to the top of a building at the Korowai Manaaki youth justice facility in Wiri, South Auckland. At the time of the incident, temperatures in Auckland had dropped to 11 degrees Celsius and there was heavy rain in the area. Oranga Tamariki deputy chief executive Mike Bush along with members of the Police and Fire and Emergency New Zealand took part in efforts to negotiate with the youths during the standoff. Following a 40-hour standoff, the six teenagers climbed down from the roof. According to Oranga Tamariki deputy chief executive Tusha Penny, the teenagers were offered KFC and McDonald's in order to convince them to climb down. During the standoff, the youths damaged the roof, ceiling cavities, and security cameras. The teenagers were subsequently placed into police custody. In late December 2023, The New Zealand Herald reported that Oranga Tamariki had spent over NZ$1,000 in purchasing fast food from KFC, McDonald's and Domino's during the two roof incidents in Christchurch and Auckland to convince the residents to come down from the roof.

On 4 July 2023, Newshub reported that Oranga Taramiki staff members had filmed several teenager residents participating in an illegal MMA-style fight at the Korowai Manaaki facility. In response, Penny confirmed that Oranga Tamariki had suspended four staff members from their duties pending investigation. In response, National Party leader Christopher Luxon criticised Oranga Tamariki's leadership and management, and advocated military-style boot camps as an alternative to the youth residences. By 6 July, a total of 11 Oranga Tamariki staff members had been stood down for alleged misconduct. In response to media coverage, a former youth justice resident alleged that Oranga Tamariki staff members organised fights as a "scare tactic" meant to reinforce a "pecking order." By 7 July, 13 staff members had been removed from youth justice residences.

On 30 August, two men were charged with organising fights at the Oranga Tamariki secure youth residence in Wiri. They appeared in court under the charge of "ill treatment/neglect of a child under 18." By 21 September, Oranga Tamariki had received 46 complaints about staff conduct at its youth justice residences, and referred 28 of these to the Police. Since June, the agency had removed 22 staff from youth justice residences in response to various complaints including inappropriate language, supplying contraband, and both physical and sexual assaults. In late September, a former Korowai Manaaki resident alleged that staff had bribed him into allowing them to beat him in return for chocolate.

On 12 December 2023, five staff members and three young people were wounded during a fight at the Muriwai Unit at the Te Puna Wai youth justice residence in Christchurch. Minister for Children Karen Chhour confirmed that five young people had been identified as instigating the fight and that the authorities were investigating and would take legal action against the instigators.

In mid February 2024, the Children and Young People's Commission/Mana Mokopuna conducted an unannounced visit to the Whakatakapokai youth justice residence in Auckland. In late June 2024, Mana Mokopuna released a report alleging that staff members physically assaulted residents, engaged in inappropriate relationships, supplied them with contraband, and tolerated a culture of bullying and violence. Between October 2023 and February 2024, there were more than 20 recorded incidents of residents being found either smoking or possessing drugs. By mid-July 2024, the Whakatakapokai report had resulted in a Police investigation, a pause in admissions to the Whakatakapokai residence and the dismissal of several staff members.

On 21 October 2024, two groups of 13 youths at Korowai Manaaki Youth Justice Facility in Auckland climbed onto the roof of a building, causing damage to the roof. Nine of the youths came down overnight while the remaining four came down on 22 October. The youths claimed they were protesting restrictions on their movements and claimed they had not been fed. Police confirmed that one of the youths had been charged with injuring another person with intent and that seven had also been charged with causing intentional damage. Oranga Tamariki Acting DCE Youth Services and Residential Care Iain Chapman confirmed that the ministry would be investigating the cause of the incident and said that Oranga Tamariki had followed proper protocols.

On 30 December 2024, eight youths climbed onto the roof of a building at the Korowai Manaaki youth justice residence in Wiri. The youths caused some damage to the facility and armed themselves with sticks. By 31 December, Oranga Tamariki acting deputy chief executive Iain Chapman confirmed that all of the youths involved had climbed down.

In late October 2025, Radio New Zealand reported that there were 254 instances between 18 August 2024 and 18 August 2025 where young persons were held in secure units at Oranga Tamariki youth justice facilities for over three consecutive days. Per Oranga Tamariki's own internal policies and procedures, the agency has to apply to the Youth Court to hold a young person in detention for over 72 hours. The Independent Children's Monitor and Children's Commissioner Dr Claire Achmad expressed concern about Oranga Tamariki's high level usage of security care for youths in its custody.

On 10 November 2025, a 15-year old youth at Korowai Manaaki Youth Justice residence in Wiri, Auckland was charged with assaulting a staff member with a weapon. In mid-December 2025, Police recaptured a teenager who had absconded from the Te Puna Wai o Tuhinapo facility in Rolleston. Oranga Tamariki announced that it would conduct a review into how the teenager had escaped.

On 10 April 2026, several youths climbed onto the roof of a building at the Korowai Manaaki Youth Justice Residence, damaging a water pipe. Police, Oranga Tamariki and Fire and Emergency New Zealand responded to the incident. By the following day, the youths had climbed down.

=== 2024 Ombudsman's review ===
On 21 February 2024, the Chief Ombudsman Peter Boshier released a report, entitled "Children in care: complaints to the Ombudsman 2019-2023," that criticised the Ministry for repeatedly failing to follow its own laws and regulations. Boshier called on the Government to make large scale changes to Oranga Tamariki. His review outlined over 2,000 complaints and enquiries around the Ministry for the past four years. Key issues identified in Boshier's report included that young people had not been listened to when they complained about issues, reports of concern were not adequately addressed, failure to engage with Māori in a culturally appropriate way, inadequate communication and support for parents, insufficient consultation with disabled parents and children and incorrect information being provided to the Family Courts. The Ombudsman recommended several changes including an organisation-wide quality improvement plan, educating staff about legislations and policies, improved the quality of information in decision-making, more training and supervision, regular tracking and reporting, and improving record keeping. Boshier said that Oranga Tamariki needed a detailed timeline to implement these changes. He also acknowledged that the Ministry had implemented several changes following his investigations including a requirement for an accurate analysis of the risks and benefits of placements in Oranga Tamariki's court documents.

The Ombudsman's report accompanied a critical Oranga Tamariki report which found that the number of children who had been abused or neglected in its care had risen from 450 in 2022 to over 500 in 2023. 2,424 reports of concern had also been filed in 2023. In response, Minister for Children Karen Chhour welcomed the report and stated that she wanted to set clear priorites for Oranga Tamariki and to provide frontline staff with resources needed to do their job. "Voyce - Whakarongo Mai" spokesperson Tupua Urlich expressed skepticism that the report would lead to a change in Oranga Tamariki's practices given the Ministry's track record of ignoring its own procedures.

=== 2024 cutbacks ===
In April 2024, Oranga Tamariki announced that it would cut 447 jobs (9% of its workforce) in order to meet the National-led coalition government's directive for government departments and agencies to reach budget savings of up to 7.5%.

In mid-August 2024, Oranga Tamariki discontinued its contracts with 190 social service providers, claiming they were underperforming or are operating at surplus. The Ministry also reduced funding to another 142 social service providers. North Shore Women's Centre and Ngāti Pāoa-run provider E Tipu E Rea expressed concerns that the loss of contracts and reduced funding would affect their ability to provide services to vulnerable people.

=== Record keeping ===
In May 2024, Oranga Tamariki announced plans to cut its unit responsible for looking after critical records for children in state care. Many of these records date back to the 1940s and 1950s. The paper documents are stored in 70,000 boxes and were badly looked after in the past by the Ministry and its predecessors, with many documents damaged and missing. Several abuse victims have used the records to find out life-changing information about their family and ethnicity.

== List of ministers for children ==
The following ministers have held the office of Minister for Children.

Party key	National
Party key	Labour
Party key	NZ First
Party key	ACT

No.	Name	Portrait	Term of Office		Prime Minister
1	Anne Tolley		20 December 2016	26 October 2017	English
2	Tracey Martin		26 October 2017	6 November 2020	Ardern
3	Kelvin Davis		6 November 2020	27 November 2023	Ardern
3	Kelvin Davis		6 November 2020	27 November 2023	Hipkins
4	Karen Chhour		27 November 2023	present	Luxon
