= Youth justice in New Zealand =

Rules and institutions of criminal law in New Zealand applicable to young people

The youth justice system in New Zealand consists of organisations and processes that deal with offending by children aged 10–13 years and young people aged 14–16 years. These differ from general criminal processes, and are governed by different principles.

== Law governing child and youth justice ==
=== Historical context ===
Following the Treaty of Waitangi, English criminal law was introduced to New Zealand. The British disregarded Māori customary practice in favour of English law and set up the foundations of the modern court system and prisons. During the early 19th century, children were often treated as adults under the law and went through the adult court and prison system. In 1867, the New Zealand Parliament passed the Neglected and Criminal Children Act 1867, which established a system of industrial schools for both neglected and delinquent children.

From 1893, the age of criminal responsibility was set at seven, meaning that children below that age could not be imprisoned. While criminal charged against those under 14 years could be dismissed if offenders did not understand the nature and consequences of their action, delinquent children could still face imprisonment and flogging until the 1920s. From 1906, youth offenders were heard in separate courts from adult offenders. In 1924, a borstal sentence system was introduced with the goal of reforming youth offenders. In 1925, the Government established the first Children's Court as part of a shift from punishment towards rehabilitation.

In 1958, the New Zealand Police established a Juvenile Crime Prevention division (later Youth Aid) to educate young people and to engage them in alternative activities to combat youth offending. In 1961, the Government raised the age of criminal responsibility from seven to 10 years of age. From 1974 youth justice, care and protection matters were heard in separate courts. Minor offenders were often referred to the Children's Board rather than the court system. In addition, probation services and new sentencing options were expanded. During the 1980s, rising Māori concerns about the large number of Māori children in state care and the youth justice system led to calls for change. In addition, growing criticism of residential centres for children and youths led to a shift towards foster and family-based care. Following a report on Māori in the social welfare system in 1988, the Government passed the Children, Young Persons, and Their Families Act 1989 (CYPTFA).

The CYPTFA signified a shift away from this to a family-based process and justice model, which views state intervention as a last resort. The argument supporting this was that the community needed to be kept together, and these ties were important for helping youth. Offenders were held accountable for their behaviour and encouraged to accept responsibility without being criminalised. In June 2017, the New Zealand Parliament passed amendment legislation renaming the bill the Oranga Tamariki Act 1989.

=== Current domestic context ===
New Zealand legislation differentiates justice processes for under-18-year-olds. The Oranga Tamariki Act 1989 governs these processes. They are diversion-focused, and include the dual aim of rehabilitation and accountability.

Other legislation is also relevant, particularly the New Zealand Bill of Rights Act 1990 (NZBORA). This includes a child's right to be dealt with in a manner that takes into account their age.

==== Overview of Oranga Tamariki Act 1989 ====
The Oranga Tamariki Act 1989 creates two separate justice processes for children and youth. This differentiation is based on the attitude that younger people are more vulnerable and have a more immature judgment, and this should be accounted for. The different processes recognise the child or youth's offending in a manner that acknowledges their higher needs and vulnerability. Thus, levels of culpability are determined by age group. However, major legislative changes now allow children to be prosecuted if the crime is sufficiently severe.

The Act aims to promote the well-being of children, young persons and their families. The process is aimed to reduce the levels of youth incarceration and constructively deal with issues and problems created by youth and children. This is done by holding the child or young person accountable for their behaviour and encouraging them to accept responsibility for their offending, while taking into account their needs and ensuring they are given the chance to develop beneficially from the experience.

==== Principles from Oranga Tamariki Act 1989 ====
Principles governing youth justice reflect different objectives from traditional criminal prosecution. These are:

- Avoidance of criminal proceedings when possible;
- Criminal proceedings are not to be used as a means of delivering welfare;
- Strengthening family and whanau;
- Keeping children and young persons in the community;
- Age as a mitigating factor;
- Sanctions should promote young person’s development within family and whanau, and be least restrictive in form;
- Regard for victims interests; and
- Special provisions to address vulnerability of children and young persons.

==== Definitions – Child and youth ====
A child under the age of ten cannot be convicted of an offence. If the child is aged 10 or 11, they can be prosecuted for murder or manslaughter. If the offender is aged 12 or 13, they can only be prosecuted for an offence if the maximum penalty is 14 years imprisonment or more, or if the maximum penalty is 10 years imprisonment or more if they are a repeat offender and the previous offence had a maximum penalty of 14 years imprisonment or more. All children aged between 10 and 13 have a rebuttable presumption of incapacity to commit a crime. Young persons aged 14 to 16 may be prosecuted for any crime, unless a higher age limit is stated in the specific legislation (e.g. people under 16 cannot be sentenced to prison, if convicted of incest).

If the child is brought within the court system, the judge has a discretion to not use the criminal process and direct them towards social welfare.

When the child offender does not fall into these categories, they are dealt with under the care and protection provisions of CYPTFA, or by the police, which are governed by youth justice principles.

If between 14 and 17, the court will have regard to the age of the offender. If the crime is dealt with in the Youth Court, then the Youth Justice Act and youth principles will apply. However the offender can be sent to the District Court or High Court for sentencing or trial, where the Sentencing Act 2002 applies. Under the Sentencing Act 2002, a child or young person under 17 cannot be sentenced to prison or home detention unless they commit a Category 4 offence (e.g. murder, manslaughter, crimes against the State) or an offence where the maximum penalty is 14 years imprisonment or more.

In December 2016, the Fifth National Government passed the Children, Young Persons, and Their Families (Oranga Tamariki) Legislation Act 2017 to expand the youth justice system to include most 17-year-olds. 17-year olds charged with serious offences would still be referred to the adult courts. These changes came into effect in 2019 and were consistent with the United Nations' 1989 Convention on the Rights of the Child, which defined a child as anyone under 18 years. The amended legislation was supported by the governing National Party, the opposition Labour Party, and human rights NGOs UNICEF and Just Speak. While the Police Association expressed cautious support, the law change was opposed by the populist New Zealand First party.

During the 2023 New Zealand general election, the libertarian ACT Party campaigned on reversing the law change and placing all 17 year olds back in the adult justice system. While ACT had previously supported the law change in 2017, the party's leader David Seymour said the party had reversed its policy due to the rising youth crime rate.

=== International context ===
There are several international conventions that affect youth justice, most significantly the United Nations Convention on the Rights of the Child 1990 (UNCROC), which New Zealand ratified in 1993. This requires New Zealand to submit regular reports on the status of children's rights. The latest UN recommendations in response to this has expressed concern about the low age of criminal responsibility, and that NZ has lowered it from 14 to 12 for grave and repeated offences. There is also concern that Oranga Tamariki Act 1989 only extends youth justice protections to 17 years, where UNCROC has defined a "child" up unto 18 years. Once young people turn 17, they are dealt with in adult courts, although age can be taken as a mitigating factor.

In 2017, the Government passed legislation raising the youth justice age to include most 17-year olds, bringing New Zealand in line with the UNCROC.

== Children and young persons justice processes ==
The Oranga Tamariki Act 1989 established an alternative system of dealing with child and youth offenders through Family Group Conferences (FGC) and the Youth Court, with the exception of non-imprisonable traffic offences in the case of young persons. This is combined with various policies employed by the police to decrease the use of the court system when possible.

=== Family Group Conferences ===
The first step is the FGC, which is used as both a pre- and post-charge mechanism. They are designed to encourage collaborative decision-making by all affected parties, reflecting Maori custom. Their purpose is to provide recommendation and make decisions that are thought to be "necessary or desirable in relation to the child or young person in respect of whom the conference was convened". If a unanimous decision is not reached, the case can go to the youth court judge.

Pre-charge FGCs account for 40% of FGCs, and are employed to determine whether prosecution can be avoided. Post-charge, they determine how to deal with cases admitted or proved in the Youth Court.

==== Criticisms ====
There is limited data on the effectiveness of FGCs.

The focus on the family has been criticised as sometimes resulting in a tension between promoting the child’s development while also addressing underlying causes for their offending, such as their family. The system may not work well for those who come from dysfunctional families, as youth justice principles aim to keep the child with their family, but this is on the assumption that the family has the ability and the interest to control young people and believes offending is not acceptable. For young people such as these, the youth justice system may be better able to provide guidance.

=== Police role ===
Police play a major role in youth justice, and such cases are governed by the principle that criminal proceedings should not be used if there is an alternative way of dealing with the offending. This means that most child and youth apprehensions are dismissed by way of police warning, cautions, or diversion. 62% of youth crime is handled by police without moving onward to FGCs or Youth Court. Police have two statutory alternatives to the formal criminal justice process.

==== Police warnings ====
Police officers are able to issue a warning where appropriate and consider that sufficient. There will be written notice of the warning. Warnings may be issued when the police officer is satisfied the person is guilty, but do not need an admission of guilt.

Warnings have been criticised as they may end up on the youth’s record regardless of whether the young person is guilty or not. Additionally, it may label them as acting with criminal behaviour when they did nothing.

==== Formal police cautions ====
These are a more formal alternative to warnings. This follows the Family Group Conference approach, and is one of the possible outcomes.

==== Diversions ====
This is a possible police option and is widely used for minor child and youth offending. This is a discretionary response and offers a lot of flexibility to the Police Youth Aid who administers it. Practical examples of potential actions are:

- an apology to the victim,
- restitution or reparation,
- possible curfew,
- maintenance of school attendance,
- completing an assignment on the effects of their offending; and
- sometimes permitting the police to take and keep photographs or fingerprints on file.

There is no need for a FGC, and the process considers a number of criteria. Using identity evidence as a bargaining tool has been questioned, as usually police are not able to hold such information unless the offender has been questioned.

=== Criticisms of the relationship between FGC and the police ===
The relationship between FGC and police diversion has been questioned. Diversion challenges the primacy of FGCs, as 62% of cases do not get to FGCs, and are instead dealt with by the police. The police refer around 6% of cases to FGCs, and outcomes here are agreed and implemented, typically without referral to the Court. The other 29% of cases involve youths being arrested and directly referred to the Youth Court, who have an obligation to refer all proved cases under its jurisdiction to a FGC for a recommendation. The reasoning for this is unclear, but it is questioned if it is useful to divert and keep the youth out of the system, or if this process is undermining the process and role of the family.

Police motives are also questioned. It is argued that police are avoiding FGCs because either they want to keep people out of the system or they do not trust it as an option.

=== Youth Court ===
The Youth Court is less formal than other courts, and the judge is more active in explaining the procedure as well as gathering data. The punishments are less severe, and are grouped depending on their restrictiveness into seven categories. The court has a stronger focus on restorative justice, reflected in the involvement of the victims, the young person's understanding and co-operation in the proceedings, acknowledgement of the power imbalanced by proving all young people with a lawyer, and the restorative justice outcomes promoted.

The Youth Court is a subdivision of the District Court and has the same general status and powers. Youth Court decisions are appealed to the High Court.

== Youth offending trends ==
Youth are over-represented in the criminal justice system. Young people aged 14–16 account for around 15% of all police arrests, which is second only to 17- to 20-year-olds. However, the number of apprehensions is decreasing.

The number and rate of youth appearing in court is also declining, with only the most serious cases reaching court. Nearly 80% of child and youth cases are dealt with by FGCs or police alternative actions, including diversions, before reaching court.

=== Characteristics of youth offenders ===
==== Gender ====
In line with adult statistics, the majority of youth appearing in court are male. While the rate of males appearing in court has substantially decreased in recent years, they still account for 79% of young people appearing in court.

The rate of females appearing in court has also decreased; however it is less marked that males.

==== Ethnicity ====
While the number of children and young people recorded as Māori has decreased, they are still over-represented in court. Around 20 percent of the youth population is Māori, yet Māori account for 54% of all children and youth in court.

The number of children and young people recorded as European appearing in court has decreased most substantially. Between 2002 and 2011, the rate dropped by 18%.

== Youth justice facilities ==
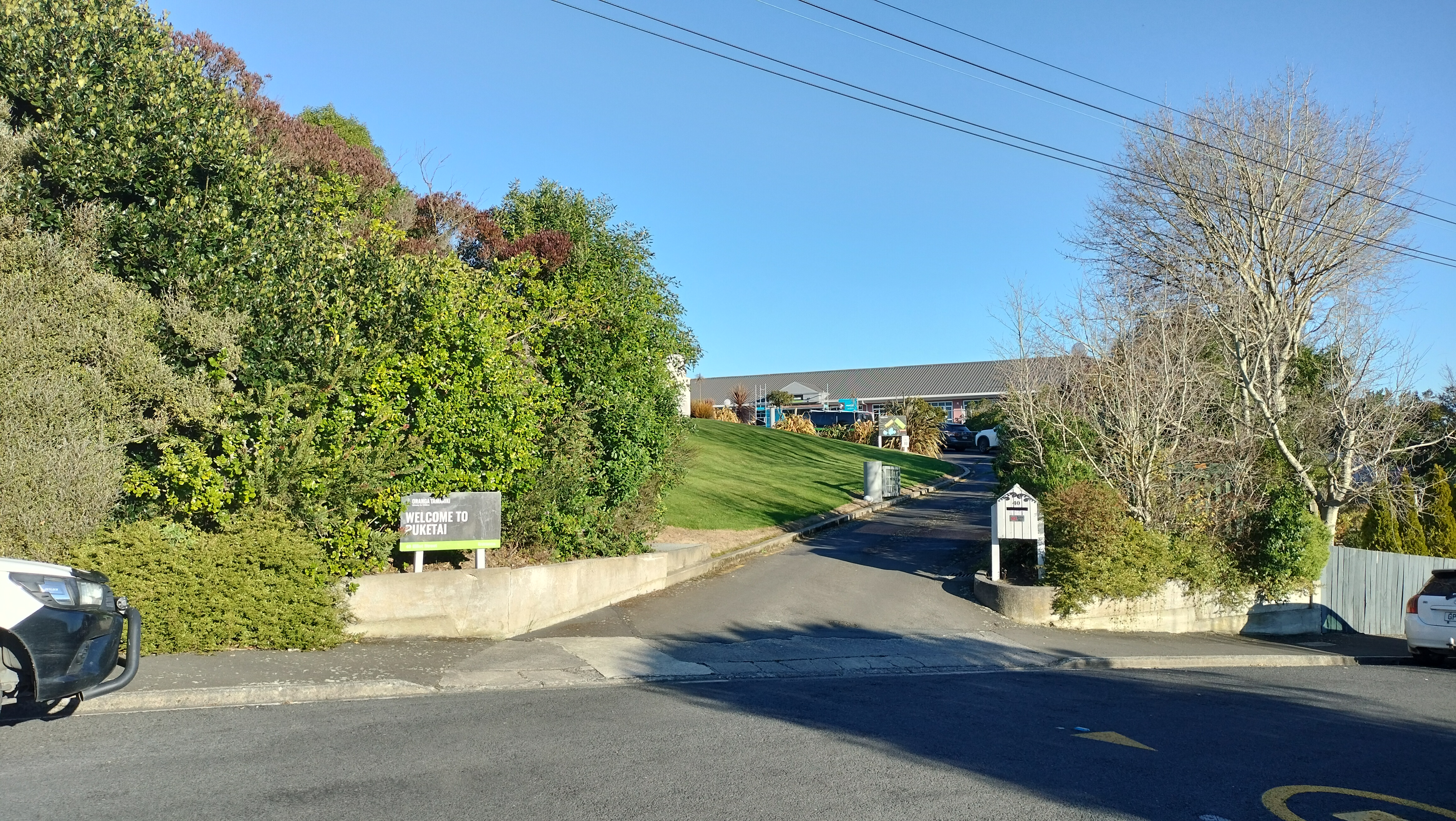
Oranga Tamariki's Puketai youth justice facility in Anderson's Bay, Dunedin

During the late 19th and 20th centuries, the New Zealand Government established various institutions including industrial schools, reformatories and borstals to house delinquent children and young people. In 1867, the Government introduced industrial schools for both neglected and delinquent children. During the 1880s, there was a shift towards foster care due to the high cost of running these industrial schools and the belief that children would develop better in a family environment. In 1900, the Government created reformatories for criminal and delinquent children. Industrial schools were closed or reorganised in 1916 in favour of newer institutions including reformatories, receiving homes, probation homes, and training schools.

In 1924, the Government introduced borstals, where youth offenders between 15 and 21 years could be detained for five years where they would undergo occupational training. These borstals failed to prevent recidivism. By 1948, there were 17 government institutions for housing delinquent and criminal children, young people who could not be fostered, deprived and abused children. In addition, girls were sent to special homes for supposed sexual misconduct. These included victims of sexual abuse, incest, and domestic violence.

In 1961, the Government introduced youth detention centres for youth offenders aged between 16 and 21 years. These detention centres had a three-month boot camp-style programme. During the 1980s, borstals and youth detention centres came under scrutiny and criticism due to various issues including their failure to address recidivism, the abuse of inmates by staff members, and growing Māori opposition to the large number of Māori children and young people in state care. The borstal system was closed in 1981. Following a 1988 report on Māori social welfare, the Government passed the Children, Young Persons, and Their Families Act 1989, which saw a shift away from formal residential care and court proceedings against youth offenders towards a more-rights-based youth justice system emphasising foster care and the retention of family ties.

Oranga Tamariki (the Ministry for Children) operates three care and protection facilities: Epuni residence in Wellington, the Puketai residence in Dunedin and a "hub" in South Auckland called Kahui Whetū. These care and protection residences are for delinquent children and young people aged between 12 and 16 years. Following an investigation into allegations of residents being abused or restrained by staff members, the Christchurch care and protection residence was closed in July 2021. In June 2023, Children's Minister Kelvin Davis announced plans to shut down the remaining care and protect residences, following calls to do so by the Children's Commissioner. As of March 2024, the Wellington, Dunedin and Auckland care and protection facilities remained open.

As of 2023, Oranga Tamariki operated five youth justice residences for juvenile offenders facing serious criminal charges including murder, rape, aggravated robbery, and gang connections. These facilities are located in Auckland, Rotorua, Palmerston North and Christchurch. Oranga Tamariki also operates three remand homes in Hamilton, Rotorua and Palmerston North. These operate alongside several community homes run by various social service providers including Youth Horizons Trust Kia Puāwai, Emerge Aotearoa, PACT and Te Tuinga Whānau Support Services Trust.
