= Independent Children's Monitor =

New Zealand government agency

- Aroturuki Tamariki (Māori)

Agency overview
- Formed: 2019
- Jurisdiction: New Zealand
- Minister responsible: Karen Chhour, Oranga Tamariki
- Agency executive: Arran Jones, Chief Executive
- Website: Official website

The Independent Children's Monitor (Māori: Aroturuki Tamariki) is an independent Crown entity that monitors the well-being of children and young people in New Zealand. It was established by the New Zealand Government in 2019 to ensure organisations working with children, young people, and their families were complying with the National Care Standards. On 1 May 2023, its role was expanded to include oversight over the entire Oranga Tamariki (Ministry for Children) system. As of 2025, Arran Jones is the Chief Executive of the Independent Children's Monitor while Nova Banaghan is the Chief Monitor. In late June 2025, the Sixth National Government passed legislation designating the Monitor as an independent Crown entity.

== Leadership and functions ==
Arran Jones ias Chief Executive of the Independent Children's Monitor while Nova Banaghan is the Chief Monitor. On 1 August 2025, the Monitor became an independent Crown entity governed by a leadership board. The first board member was Dr Angela Jury ONZM. The Monitor is also supported by several Māori leaders known as Te Kāhui. As of 2025, Te Kāhui consists of Tā Mark Solomon, Katie Murray, Eugene Ryder, Enid Ratahi-Pryor, Wayne Blissett and Dee-Ann Wolferstan. The Independent Children's Monitor also reports to Minister for Social Development and Employment Louise Upston.

The Independent Children's Monitor is governed by the Oversight of Oranga Tamariki System Legislation Amendment Act 2025, which supersedes and amends the earlier Oversight of Oranga Tamariki System Act 2022. The 2025 Act designates the Children's Monitor as an independent Crown entity in accordance with the Crown Entities Act 2004. The law also creates a three-member board to support the Independent Children's Monitor including at least one judge. Per law, its operations and findings are independent of government ministers and agencies.

The Children's Monitor monitors the Oranga Tamaraki system by ensure that organisations working with children and young people comply with their goals and legal requirements, monitor compliance with the Oranga Tamariki Act 1989, National Care Standards regulations, and the Oversight of the Oranga Tamariki System Act 2022, and monitor systems-based performance by using an outcomes-based approach to vulnerable children and young people. Besides interacting with children, young people and their communities, the Children's Monitor also works with government agencies such as Oranga Tamariki and the New Zealand Police, and community organisations including Māori and iwi (tribal) organisations.

== History ==
=== Origins ===
The Independent Children's Monitor was established in 2019 to ensure that organisations working with children and young people complied with the Government's National Care Standards. It was first established as a business unit of the Ministry of Social Development.

=== 2022 law change ===
In August 2022, the Sixth Labour Government passed two new laws replacing the Children's Commissioner with the Children and Young People's Commission and sharing oversight of the Oranga Tamariki system between the Independent Monitor and Ombudsman.

In mid April 2023, Deputy Public Service Commissioner Heather Baggott confirmed the appointment of Arran Jones to the positions of Independent Monitor of the Oranga Tamariki System and Chief Executive of the Independent Children's Monitor, commencing 1 May 2023. The Independent Children's Monitor's role was also expanded to include oversight of the entire Oranga Tamariki system. The organisation was also reconstituted as a departmental agency within the Education Review Office. Besides reporting to Parliament, the Monitor also worked with the Commission and the Office of the Ombudsman. While the Commission focused more on advocacy, the Children's Monitor primarily was a monitoring agency.

In early August 2024, the Independent Children's Monitor released a follow-up report to Dame Karen Poutasi's report into the death of five year old Malachi Subecz, who died after prolonged abuse by his guardian Michaela Barriball. The assessment found that the child protection system had not improved since Subecz's death. Several contributing factors included limited staffing capability, limited resources and half of NGO reports not being followed upon. The Monitor's report found that several of the recommendations of Poutasi's report had not been implemented and that several agencies including Oranga Tamariki were not prioritising child safety.

=== 2025 law change ===
In late June 2025, the Sixth National Government passed legislation designating the Independent Children's Monitor as a stand-alone independent Crown entity, effective 1 August. The ombudsman would still retain its investigatory powers. The 2025 legislation also created a three-member board including a judge to assist the Monitor's work. Independent Children's Monitor CEO Arran Jones would remain for a year to oversee the transition.
