= Oranga Tamariki Act 1989 =

Act of Parliament in New Zealand

Oranga Tamariki Act 1989 Children's and Young People’s Well-being Act 1989

New Zealand Parliament
- Long title: An Act to reform the law relating to children and young persons who are in need of care or protection or who offend against the law and, in particular,— (a) To advance the wellbeing of families and the wellbeing of children and young persons as members of families, whanau, hapu, iwi, and family groups: (b) To make provision for families, whanau, hapu, iwi, and family groups to receive assistance in caring for their children and young persons: (c) To make provision for matters relating to children and young persons who are in need of care or protection or who have offended against the law to be resolved, wherever possible, by their own family, whanau, hapu, iwi, or family group: (d) [Repealed] (e) To repeal the Children and Young Persons Act 1974
- Royal assent: 27 May 1989
- Administered by: Ministry of Social Development

Legislative history
- Passed: 1989

Related legislation
- Oversight of Oranga Tamariki System Act 2022; Children's Commissioner Act 2022; Oranga Tamariki (Repeal of Section 7AA) Amendment Act 2025; Oversight of Oranga Tamariki System Legislation Amendment Act 2025
- Status: Current legislation

The Oranga Tamariki Act 1989 or Children's and Young People's Well-being Act 1989 (titled the Children, Young Persons, and Their Families Act 1989 prior to 14 July 2017) is an Act of the New Zealand Parliament that was passed in 1989. The Act's main purpose is to "promote the well-being of children, young persons, and their families and family groups." In June 2017, the New Zealand Parliament passed amendment legislation renaming the bill the Oranga Tamariki Act 1989.

== Key provisions ==
The Act introduced the Family Group Conference (FGC) as a means of making decisions about a child or young person that did not involve a Court Hearing. The Act set out procedures for the removal of abused children from their parent's care, making the best interests of the child the first consideration. It also set out procedures for dealing with youth offenders, making arrest and imprisonment interventions of last resort. The Act also provided for a Commissioner for Children.

The Act determines how the state intervenes to protect children from abuse and neglect, and to prevent and address child and youth offending. The Act introduced principles that changed the way decisions were made about children and young people, enabling family to become partners in the decision-making process to resolve family issues.

Fundamental to the Act was the incorporation and inclusion of families throughout the process of making decisions in matters of care and protection of children and young people, and offending by young people. This was most clearly reflected in the extensive use of Family Group Conferences as the preferred method of operation, and in the use and involvement of family in meeting the needs of children and young people who had offended and/or who were the subject of care and protection actions. Generally, it was expected that families would provide for their members and solutions were to be sought within the family.

== History ==
The Children, Young Persons, and Their Families Act 1989 was one of the significant social service reform legislation implemented by the Fourth Labor Government of New Zealand. It repealed the Children and Young Persons Act 1974, which had been introduced by the Third Labor Government of New Zealand.

In April 2007, the Ministry of Social Development called for submissions on a discussion document reviewing how the Act was working, with a view to making improvements.

=== Amendments ===
==== Children's ombudsmen ====
In 2003, the Act was amended by the Children's Commissioner Act 2003, which replaced the previous Commissioner for Children with a new Children's Commissioner. The Children's Commissioner was also designated as a Crown entity and tasked with promoting the United Nations Convention on the Rights of the Child (UNCRC).

In August 2022, the Labour Government passed two new laws replacing the Children's Commissioner with the Children and Young People's Commission and splitting oversight of the Oranga Tamariki system between the Independent Children's Monitor and Ombudsman's Office.

On 26 June 2025, the Sixth Government of New Zealand passed legislation designating the Independent Children's Monitor as an independent Crown entity, dissolving the Children and Young People's Commission and reinstated the Children's Commissioner.

==== Name change ====
In June 2017, the New Zealand Parliament passed the Children, Young Persons, and Their Families (Oranga Tamariki) Legislation Act 2016 which amended the Children, Young Persons and Their Families Act 1989 by renaming it the Oranga Tamariki Act 1989 and specified that 17 year olds would be treated as adults by the justice system.

==== Section 7AA ====
On 1 July 2019, the Sixth Labour Government made several amendments to the Oranga Tamariki Act 1989. These amendments included Section 7AA, which requires Oranga Tamariki (the Ministry of Children) to focus on reducing disparities for Māori children and young people, take into account Māori whakapapa (genealogy) and family ties when uplifting children, and partner with iwi (tribes) and Māori organisations. Section 7AA sought to reduce the high uplifting rate of Māori children by state agencies and to ensure that uplifted children were not disconnected from their Māori families and culture.

During the lead-up to the 2023 New Zealand general election, the opposition ACT party campaigned on repealing Section 7AA, saying that it prioritised race-based factors over the safety and well-being of Māori children. Following the 2023 election, the newly-formed National-led coalition government announced that it would repeal Section 7AA as part of the National Party's coalition agreement with ACT. The repeal legislation passed into law on 3 April 2025. While National, ACT and New Zealand First supported the bill, it was opposed by Labour, the Greens and Te Pāti Māori. The new law amends retains aspects of Section 7AA requiring the Chief of Oranga Tamariki to develop strategic relationships with Māori and iwi (tribal) organisations, and contain provisions for the Chief and Independent Children's Monitor to report on the well-being of Māori children, youth and their families.

== See also ==
- Oranga Tamariki

== Sources ==
- Cheyne, Christine; O'Brien, Mike; Belgrave, Michael (1997). Social policy in Aotearoa/New Zealand : a critical introduction. Auckland: Oxford University Press. ISBN 0195583345.
- Eru Ruanui Tia Kapa-Kingi (2018). Ka mate, ka ora rānei? Oranga Tamariki Act not enough to address Māori overrepresentation in state custody and out of home placements – A way forward through Crown-Māori partnership (PDF) (Report). Victoria University of Wellington.
