= Education Review Office (New Zealand) =

New Zealand government department

- Te Tari Arotake Matauranga (Māori)

Agency overview
- Formed: 1989
- Preceding agency: Department of Education
- Jurisdiction: New Zealand
- Headquarters: Level 1, Legal House, 101 Lambton Quay, Wellington; WELLINGTON 6140
- Annual budget: Total budget for 2019/20; Vote Education Review Office ▲$34,461,000
- Ministers responsible: Hon Erica Stanford, Minister of Education; Hon David Seymour, Associate Minister of Education (Partnership Schools)
- Agency executive: Ruth Shinoda, Acting Chief Executive and Chief Review Officer
- Website: www.ero.govt.nz

The Education Review Office (ERO; Māori: Te Tari Arotake Mātauranga) is the public service department of New Zealand charged with reviewing and publicly reporting on the quality of education and care of students in all New Zealand schools and early childhood services.

== Leadership and structure ==
Led by a Chief Review Officer – the department's chief executive – the Office has approximately 150 designated review officers located in five regions. These regions are: Northern, Waikato/Bay of Plenty, Central, Southern, and Te Uepū ā-Motu (ERO's Māori review services unit).

The Education Review Office and the Ministry of Education are two separate public service departments. The functions and powers of the office are set out in Part 28 (sections 323–328) of the Education Act 1989.

In May 2023, the Independent Children's Monitor was transferred from the Ministry of Social Development, and reconstituted as a departmental agency of the Education Review Office. The Children's Monitor oversees the entire Oranga Tamariki (Ministry for Children) system.

== Mandate and responsibilities ==
ERO reviews the education provided for school students in all state schools, private schools and Kura Kaupapa Māori. It also reviews the education and care provided for children in early childhood education services and kōhanga reo. Reviews are carried out every three years on average, but are more frequent where the performance of a school or service is below standard or there are risks to the education or safety of the students or children. The department also checks that schools are meeting necessary legal requirements. Occasionally, special reviews of individual schools are ordered outside the normal review cycle, which focus on specific areas of concern with a school's management.

ERO reports to individual boards of trustees on what they are doing well and where they need to improve. In some cases of poor performance or major risks to students, the department may recommend to the Minister and Secretary of Education some form of intervention to the school's management. Reports on individual schools and early childhood services are freely available to the public via ERO's website.

These reviews may take place in Māori-medium, English-medium and Pacific-medium contexts, and additionally has the ability to undertake reviews of private and independent schools, homeschooling, schools and kura with international students, school hostels, and new and merging schools’ readiness to open.

The majority of reviews undertaken by the ERO are initiated by Chief Review Officer, however the Minister of Education does also have the ability to request reviews of specific aspects of the education sector under the ERO's remits. The ERO does not hold its own policy mandate, instead fulfilling more of a research and evaluation function but does support relevant policy development based on its operational insights.

== History ==
In late October 2024, ERO released truancy figures confirming that over 80,000 students were absent from school for more than three weeks during Term 2 of the 2024 school year. The department recommended that the Ministry of Education shift its focus from its Early Attendance Service programmes to preventing children from missing out from schools.

In mid March 2026, Education Minister Erica Stanford announced that ERO would be introducing a new colour-coded, four-point school rating system. The rating system would cover 14 areas including student achievement, student progress, teaching, reading, writing, mathematics and attendance.
