= Frances Eivers =

New Zealand District Court judge

Frances Jean Eivers is a New Zealand District Court judge; she is Māori and is a member of the Ngāti Maniapoto iwi. In October 2021 she was appointed Children's Commissioner for New Zealand.

== Biography ==
Eivers was born and brought up in Te Teko in the eastern Bay of Plenty. She began her legal career in 1985, when she was admitted to the bar in the Auckland High Court. She has worked as a solicitor both in England and New Zealand, specialising in family law. In November 2000 she was appointed Counsel for the Child and in 2004 was appointed a Youth Advocate. Eivers was appointed a District Court judge with a Family Court warrant in 2009. She was sworn in as a judge at a ceremony held at her home marae, Te Teko's Kokohinau Marae. In addition, she has presided over Rangatahi Courts, which hear cases involving young Māori people.

Eivers was a founding member of Te Huinga Roia (Māori Law Society) and serves as a mentor to law students at the University of Auckland Law School.

In October 2021 she was appointed Children's Commissioner. Eivers served in that role until the Children's Commissioner was replaced by the Children and Young People's Commission in July 2023. She subsequently served as the first Chief Children's Commissioner in the Commission until 31 October 2023.
