= Crown Entities Act 2004 =

Act of Parliament in New Zealand

New Zealand Parliament
- Royal assent: 21 December 2004
- Commenced: 25 January 2005
- Administered by: State Services Commission and the Treasury
- Status: Current legislation

The Crown Entities Act 2004 is a statute of the New Zealand Parliament that provides the framework for the establishment, governance, and operation of Crown entities, and to clarify accountability relationships between Crown entities, their board members, their responsible Ministers on behalf of the Crown, and the House of Representatives.
