= Children and Young People's Commission =

Logo of the Children and Young People's Commission

Children and Young People's Commission (Mana Mokopuna) was an independent Crown entity established by the New Zealand Government in July 2023 as a successor to the former Children's Commissioner. Like its predecessor, Mana Mokopuna advocated for children's rights in New Zealand, provided advice and guidance to the government and agencies, and lobbied for children in the decision-making process. The Commission consisted of the fulltime Chief Children's Commissioner, a deputy, and three Commissioners.

In late June 2025, the Sixth National Government passed legislation abolishing the Commission and reinstating the Children's Commissioner.

== Leadership and functions ==
Mana Mokopuna was an independent Crown entity. As of April 2025, it consisted of the Chief Children's Commissioner Dr. Claire Achmad, Deputy Children's Commissioner Donna Matahaere-Atariki, and Children's Commissioners Dr. Julie Wharewera-Mika, Ronelle Baker and Josiah Tualamali'i.

The Commission's regulatory framework was the Children and Young People's Commission Act 2022 and the companion Oversight of Oranga Tamariki System Act 2022. Under the Oversight of Oranga Tamariki Act, the Commission retained the responsibility to monitor Oranga Tamariki's youth residences under the Optional Protocol to the Convention against Torture (OPCAT), including the use of both planned and unplanned visits. The Commission also worked with the Independent Children's Monitor, which also assumed the monitoring functions of the former Children's Commissioner. The Commission focused more on advocacy for children and young people.

== History ==
On 24 August 2022, the Sixth Labour Government passed the Children and Young People's Commission Act 2022, which replaced the Children's Commissioner with the Children and Young People's Commission. The law change was opposed by all parties, excepted the governing Labour Party.

The Commission formally came into existence on 1 July 2023, assuming the functions of the Children's Commissioner. The last Children's Commissioner, Judge Frances Eivers, served as the first Chief Children's Commissioner until 31 October 2023. She was succeeded by Dr. Achmad, who was joined by Matahaere-Atariki, Dr Wharewera-Mika, Tualamali'i, and Baker.

Between 13 and 15 February 2024, Mana Mokopuna conducted an unannounced visit to Oranga Tamariki's Whakatakapokai youth justice residence in South Auckland. On 30 June 2024, Mana Mokopuna released a report alleging that staff members physically assaulted residents, engaged in inappropriate relationships, supplied them with contraband, and tolerated a culture of bullying and violence among the residents. Between October 2023 and February 2024, there were more than 20 recorded incidents of residents being found smoking or possessing drugs. By mid-July 2024, Mana Mokopuna's report had resulted in a Police investigation, a pause in admissions to the Whakatakapokai residence and the dismissal of several staff members.

On 26 June 2025, the Sixth National Government of New Zealand passed the Oversight of Oranga Tamariki System Legislation Amendment Act 2025, which disestablished the Commission and reinstated the Children's Commissioner. Under the legislation, Dr Achmad would remain as the sole Children's Commissioner from 1 August 2025.
