= Children's ombudsman =

Public authority in charge of children's rights

A children's ombudsman, children's commissioner, youth commissioner, child advocate, children's commission, youth ombudsman or equivalent body is a public authority in various countries charged with the protection and promotion of the rights of children and young people, either in society at large, or in specific categories such as children in contact with the care system. The agencies usually have a substantial degree of independence from the executive, the term is often used differently from the original meaning of ombudsman, it is often an umbrella term, often used as a translation convention (the term is often not used even in countries that do have ombudsmen in other positions) or national human rights institutions, dealing with individual complaints, intervening with other public authorities, conducting research, and – where their mandate permits them to engage in advocacy – generally promoting children's rights in public policy, law and practice. The first children's commissioner was established in Norway in 1981. The creation of such institutions has been promoted by the United Nations Committee on the Rights of the Child, and, from 1990 onwards, by the Council of Europe.

Largely a European phenomenon, although some exist in other regions, many of the institutions belong to the European Network of Ombudspersons for Children (ENOC). There are also sub-regional networks, including the Children's Rights Ombudspersons' Network in South and Eastern Europe (CRONSEE), created in 2006, and the British and Irish Network of Ombudsmen and Children’s Commissioners (BINOCC), which first met in 2005.

== Children's ombudsman services by country ==
=== Australia ===
Australia appointed its first National Children's Commissioner, Megan Mitchell, in February 2013. Mitchell served two terms in the role until 2020 and was replaced by Anne Hollonds. The Commissioner's role is to promote public discussion and awareness of issues affecting children; conduct research and education programs; consult directly with children and representative organisations; and examine Commonwealth legislation, policies and programs that relate to children's human rights. The Australian Human Rights Commission proposed the creation of the office in 2010, and the Commissioner is based within the AHRC.

The Commonwealth Ombudsman and State ombudsmen retain some jurisdiction over matters affecting children.

Children's commissioner offices, varying in remit, have been created at the state and territorial levels. Most have a limited remit, focussing on disadvantaged children such as those in government care, or children with no one to act on their behalf.

- In the Australian Capital Territory, the ACT Human Rights Commission includes a Children and Young People Commissioner. The office has a broad mandate to promote and protect the rights of all children and young people in the ACT. The current ACT Children and Young People Commissioner is Alasdair Roy.
- The creation of a Commission for Children and Young People in New South Wales followed a legislative reform in 1998 that gave specific child protection responsibilities to the state ombudsman.
- In the Northern Territory, the Office of the Children's Commissioner was established by the territorial Assembly's Care and Protection of Children Act 2007. Its initially restricted remit - including complaint handling, monitoring follow-up to the Inquiry into the Protection of Aboriginal Children from Sexual Abuse, reduction of child mortality, and certain other matters - was significantly expanded by a legislative amendment in 2011 giving it the right to mount investigations on its own initiative. The current Commissioner is Howard Bath.
- Queensland's Commission for Children and Young People and Child Guardian.
- The Office of the Guardian for Children and Young People, South Australia.
- The Commissioner for Children and Young People, Tasmania.
- The Commissioner for Children and Young People, Victoria.
- The Commissioner for Children and Young People, Western Australia.

=== Austria ===
The Federal Children’s Ombudsman (German: Kinder- und Jugendanwaltschaft des Bundes) was established by the Federal Youth Welfare Act 1989. In the meantime, each of the nine Bundesländer (states) have set up an Ombudsman for Children and Youth. The federal office is funded through the Federal Chancellor's office. The federal office focusses on advocacy on behalf of children and on promoting the principle of non-violent education, while actual complaints are being handled on the state level.

=== Belgium ===
Belgium has two agencies, both members of the ENOC network.

The Child Rights Commission (Dutch: Kinderrechtencommissariaat) was established by the Flemish Parliament in June 1998. The Commission's services include mediation, information, complaints about possible violations of child rights and policy advice. It conducts public information and education campaigns, conducts and monitors research, and offers views on legislative initiatives that may affect minors. The Commission reports annually to the Flemish Parliament. The current Commissioner, Bruno Vanobbergen, was appointed in 2009.

Bernard De Vos is the Commissioner for Child Rights of the French Community (French: Délégué général de la Communauté française aux droits de l’enfant), which has a more or less identical range of functions but was created by, and reports to, the Parliament of the French Community.

=== Bosnia and Herzegovina ===
The Human Rights Ombudsman of Bosnia and Herzegovina has as one of its seven departments a Child Rights Section (Bosnian: Odjel za praćenje prava djece), and is a full member of ENOC.

The Republika Srpska has an Ombudsman for Children (Serbian: Ombudsmana za djecu), also an ENOC member. The office, established in 2008, promotes legislative compliance with the UN Convention on the Rights of the Child; investigates alleged violations of the rights and interests of children; advocates the rights and interests of children, and conducts public information and education work.

=== Canada ===
The Canadian provinces and territories have a variety of agencies that serve as more or less independent advocates of the rights of children, particularly those that have been clients of social services. They differ in mandate but share a commitment to child rights, and co-ordinate their activities through the Canadian Council of Child and Youth Advocates (CCCYA).

- In Alberta, the Ministry of Children’s Services created an office of Children's Advocate in September 1989; in 2004 this became the Office of the Child and Youth Advocate (OCYA). As an internal advocacy system, the Advocate's services can only be accessed by, or on behalf of, young people already served under the Child, Youth and Family Enhancement Act (Enhancement Act) or the Protection of Sexually Exploited Children Act (PSECA).
- In British Columbia, the Representative for Children and Youth (RCY) provides policy advice and advocacy services on behalf of all children and young people (under 19), and in particular, supports children, youth and families who need help in dealing with the care services provided by the Ministry of Children and Family Development. Prior to the creation of the RCY, the provincial Ombudsman had, in 1987, designated a Deputy Ombudsman for Children and Youth.
- In Manitoba, although limited to dealing with children and young people who have been in contact with official childcare and adoption services, the Office of the Children's Advocate of Manitoba has a degree of independence, and complaint-handling and advisory functions, similar to those of an ombudsman.
- In New Brunswick, the New Brunswick Child and Youth Advocate was established.
- In Newfoundland and Labrador, the Office of the Child and Youth Advocate was established in 2001.
- The Nova Scotia Ombudsman has a children's ombudsman section.
- The Ontario Ombudsman was given responsibility for protecting the interests of children in Ontario through the Child, Youth and Family Services Act, which fully commenced in 2020.
- In Prince Edward Island the Office of the Child and Youth Advocate was established in 2020 through the Child and Youth Advocate Act.
- In Quebec a Children's Rights Commissioner is to be appointed from late 2025.
- The Saskatchewan Advocate for Children and Youth is Dr. Lisa Broda. This is an independent office of the Legislative Assembly of Saskatchewan whose mandate is to uphold the rights, interests, and well-being of children youth in Saskatchewan who are or have been receiving services from a provincial ministry, agency, and/or publicly-funded health entity.
- The Nunavut Representative for Children and Youth was established in 2015.
- The Yukon Youth and Children Advocate Office was established in 2009.

=== Colombia ===
The People's Defender (Spanish: Defensoría del Pueblo) or Ombudsman's Office of Colombia has a children's rights unit.

=== Costa Rica ===
Costa Rica was the second country (after Norway) to establish a children's ombudsman, setting up the Defender of Childhood (Spanish: Defensoría de la Infancia) in 1987. In 1993, this body was absorbed into the main Defender of the Inhabitants (ombudsman) agency, which created a specialist child rights section.

=== Croatia ===
The Ombudsperson for Children (Croatian: Pravobranitelj za djecu) aims to ensure protection of the rights of children; to influence the legislative and executive authorities to take child rights into consideration; to promote the acknowledgment of children’s opinions and attitudes, and to inform adults and children about child rights. The Ombudsperson, currently Mila Jelavić, has about 10 staff and submits annual reports to the Croatian Parliament. The office is a member of ENOC and CRONSEE.

=== Cyprus ===
The Commissioner for Children’s Rights (Greek: Επίτροπος Προστασίας των Δικαιωμάτων του Παιδιού) was established by the Commissioner for the Protection of Children’s Rights Law, 2007. Leda Koursoumba was appointed first Commissioner with effect from February 2008. The agency is full member of ENOC. In 2011, the Commissioner presented her first parallel report to the UN Committee on the Rights of the Child.

=== Denmark ===
In February 2011, the Danish government turned down a renewed request from a United Nations committee to create the position of Ombudsman for Children (Danish: Børneombudsmand); the UN body had in 2001 suggested as an alternative the creation of a child rights focal point within the national ombudsman office.

There is a National Council for Children (Danish: Børnerådet), a statutory national institution which is politically independent although administratively linked with the Ministry of Family and Consumer Affairs. The Council works to safeguard the rights of children; it provides information on conditions for children in society and offers advice and consultancy to authorities on issues concerning children.

=== El Salvador ===
The Human Rights Procurator, or ombudsman (Spanish: Procurador para la Defensa de los Derechos Humanos) has an adjunct ombudsman for children's rights.

=== Estonia ===
In December 2010, the Parliamentary Finance Committee appropriated 383,000 euros to the Chancellor of Justice, the approximate equivalent of a national ombudsman, to establish a children's ombudsman office.

=== Finland ===
Finland recently established the Office of the Ombudsman for Children (Finnish: Lapsiasiavaltuutettu). Previously, within the Parliamentary Ombudsman's Office, there was a specialist ombudsman for children's welfare.

=== France ===
In May 2011, the French Government merged the office of the Children's Ombudsman (French: Défenseur des enfants) with the main ombudsman agency and other bodies, creating a new body named the Defender of Rights (Défenseur des droits). In July 2011 Dominique Baudis was appointed to the office by the Council of State on the nomination of the Prime Minister, for a single six-year term.

=== Georgia ===
The Public Defender (ombudsman) of Georgia has established a Child Rights Centre.

=== Greece ===
Although Greece does not have a stand-alone office, the Citizen's Advocate (Ombudsman) of Greece (Greek: Συνήγορος του Πολίτη), created in 1998 as an independent authority, has in addition to the Ombudsman, six Deputy Ombudsman posts, one of whom coordinates the activities of the Department of Children's Rights, and is sometimes referred to as the Ombudsman for Children’s Rights. The Department was established in 2003, by law 3094/2003, to investigate alleged acts and omissions by individuals and legal entities that violate the rights of children or endanger their wellbeing. Currently, the Greek Deputy Ombudswoman for Children’s Rights is Theoni Koufonikolakou.

=== Guatemala ===
Within the office of the Human Rights Procurator (ombudsman), a member of staff is designated to serve as Childhood Rights Defender (Spanish: Defensor de los Derechos de la Niñez).

=== Honduras ===
The National Human Rights Commissioner (Spanish: Comisionado Nacional de Derechos Humanos) has a specific mandate (and an internal section) for the protection of the rights of children and families, and there are also some municipal child rights defenders.

=== Hungary ===
The Deputy Commissioner in the office of the Parliamentary Human Rights Commissioner handles cases concerning children.

=== Ireland ===
Emily Logan became Ireland’s first Ombudsman for Children in March 2004, following the passage of the Ombudsman for Children Act 2002. The main areas of work of the Office of the Children's Ombudsman (OCO) are complaints handling; communication and participation; and research and policy. The OCO is a member of the British and Irish Network of Ombudsmen and Children’s Commissioners (BINOCC).

=== Kazakhstan ===
Kazakhstan created the office of Ombudsman for Children’s Rights on 8 April 2016. Presidential decree was issued on 25 March 2016, appointing Deputy of the Majilis of the Kazakh Parliament Zagipa Baliyeva as Children's Rights Ombudsman of the Republic of Kazakhstan.

=== Lithuania ===
The Children’s Rights Ombudsman Institution of the Republic of Lithuania (Lithuanian: Lietuvos Respublikos Vaiko Teisių Apsaugos Kontrolieriaus Įstaiga) was established in September 2000. It seeks to improve legal protection of children, to defend the rights and interests of children, and to exercise supervision and control of the actions of public authorities in relation to children. The Ombudsman can conduct investigations, require the production of information and evidence, propose legislation and policy, and report to the President, the Seimas (Parliament), the Government or a municipal council on violations of legal acts or shortcomings in the law.

=== Netherlands ===
In the Netherlands, the function of Ombudsman for Children (Dutch: de Kinderombudsman) is embedded in the National Ombudsman office. Under legislation enacted in June 2010, and effective from April 2011, a Deputy Ombudsman, Marc Dullaert, was designated the first Ombudsman for Children. Both the National Ombudsman and the Ombudsman for Children report directly and independently to the Dutch Parliament. The role of the Ombudsman for Children is to promote the rights of the child in the public and private spheres by providing advice and information; advising the government and Parliament on legislation and policy that affects the rights of the child; investigating complaints or conducting investigations on his own initiative, and monitoring how complaints by children or their representatives are dealt with by the relevant bodies.

=== New Zealand ===
The Children's Commissioner (Māori: Mana Mokopuna) was founded under the Oranga Tamariki Act 1989, and the Children's Commissioner Act 2003 reformed the institution while bringing into domestic law the UN Convention on the Rights of the Child. The Commissioner promotes awareness and understanding of the views and interests of children, conducts research and inquiries, and can investigate individual cases. A Young People’s Reference Group (YPRG), comprising young people between 12 and 18, assists the Commissioner and other government agencies in strategic planning and consultation with children and youth. The Children's Commissioner is usually a senior paediatrician or academic. The current Commissioner is Judge Frances Eivers who succeeded Andrew Becroft in 2021.

In August 2022, the Sixth Labour Government passed two new laws replacing the Children's Commissioner with the Children and Young People's Commission and splitting oversight of the Oranga Tamariki system between the Independent Children's Monitor and Ombudsman's Office.

In late June 2025, the Sixth National Government passed legislation designating the Independent Children's Monitor as a stand-alone independent Crown entity, disestablishing the Children and Young People's Commission and reinstating the Children's Commissioner; effective 1 August 2025.

=== Nicaragua ===
The Human Rights Procurator, or ombudsman (Spanish: Procurador para la Defensa de los Derechos Humanos) has an office for children's rights.

=== Norway ===
In 1981 Norway was the first country in the world to establish an Ombudsman for Children (Norwegian: Barneombudet). The office has statutory powers to investigate individual complaints; it also monitors legislation and policy, and engages in human rights education. It seeks incorporation of the Convention on the Rights of the Child into all areas of society, and is particularly attentive to vulnerable children. The current ombudsman is Inga Bejer Engh, who also is known as the prosecutor of Anders Behring Breivik. The former ombudsman was Anne Lindboe, a pediatrician (appointed in 2012). Dr. Lindboe came to international attention when she called for circumcision to be banned until the age of 15, and for Jews and Muslims to replace it with a symbolic ceremony. Dr. Lindboe succeeded Reidar Hjermann (2004–2012), Trond Waage (1996–2004), Trond-Viggo Torgersen (1989–1995) and Målfrid Grude Flekkøy (1981–1989).

=== Peru ===
In addition to Defenders of the Child and Adolescent (Spanish: defensorías del niño y del adolescente) established at local level and supported by municipalities and NGOs, the national Public Defender (ombudsman) (Defensor del Pueblo) deals with exceptional cases.

=== Poland ===
The Children's Ombudsman (Polish: Rzecznik Praw Dziecka) was established by the Law on the Ombudsman for Children passed on 6 January 2000, implementing article 72(4) of the Constitution of the Republic of Poland. The position is appointed by the parliament, and is currently held by Monika Horna-Cieślak.

=== Portugal ===
The Portuguese Ombudsman (Portuguese: Provedor de Justiça, Justice Provider) offers a toll-free telephone line for children.

There are also the president of the National Commission for the Protection of Children and Young People at Risk.

=== Russia ===
The office of Children's Rights Commissioner for the president of the Russian Federation, also known as Presidential Commissioner for Children's Rights, was first held by Alexei Golovan. By presidential decree on 30 December 2009, President Medvedev appointed Pavel Astakhov to the post. He was followed by Anna Kuznetsova in 2016, whose controversial views led the founding editor of the business newspaper Vedomosti to interpret her appointment as a sign that President Vladimir Putin was becoming more ideological. On 27 October 2021, Maria Lvova-Belova was appointed to the position. In 2023, following the Russian invasion of Ukraine and various investigations surrounding alleged child abductions during the war, Lvova-Belova and Putin were issued arrest warrants by the ICC.

The first children's ombudsmen began to appear in the regions in 1998 within the framework of cooperation between Russia and UNICEF. By 2010, children's ombudsmen were operating in 50 regions of the Russian Federation.

=== Serbia ===
The Protector of Citizens of the Republic of Serbia (Ombudsman), an independent state authority with a broad mandate to protect human rights and freedoms, was created by law in 2005 and given constitutional status in 2006. The office is a full member of ENOC.

=== Slovakia ===
In 2016 the Slovak Ombudsman for children appointed a first Deputy with responsibility for, among other things, child rights.

=== Slovenia ===
In 2003 the Slovenian Ombudsman appointed a fourth Deputy with responsibility for, among other things, child rights.

=== Spain ===
The national ombudsman (Defensor del Pueblo) and the corresponding bodies in the autonomous communities have competence over matters affecting children and young people, and the national agency can bring cases to the courts. In Andalusia the regional ombudsman agency (the Defensor del Pueblo Andaluz) has a deputy ombudsman (the Minors' Defender, Defensor del Menor) for children and young people, as does the equivalent in Catalonia (the Síndic de Greuges).

=== Sweden ===
In 1990 the Riksdag ratified the Convention on the Rights of the Child (CRC). Sweden was thereby committed under international law to implement the Convention, and around the same time the Government examined the issue of appointing an Ombudsman for Children. In 1993, the Riksdag finally approved the appointment of an Ombudsman, and The Ombudsman for Children's Act 1933.335 came into effect on July 1. According to this act, the Ombudsman for Children in Sweden (Swedish: Barnombudsmannen) tasked with public advocacy and the dissemination of information about the rights and needs of children and young people, and should represent children regarding their rights and interests on the basis of the CRC.

=== Ukraine ===
The position of Commissioner of the President of Ukraine for Children's Rights, or children's ombudsman, was allocated in August 2011 to Yuriy Pavlenko, who had served as Minister for Family, Youth and Sport in the Yekhanurov, Alliance of National Unity and Tymoshenko cabinets. Ukraine was the first country to install a child as children's ombudsman when Ivan Cherevko and Julia Kruk were jointly appointed as the first ombudsmen in late 2005. On December 18, 2014 Mykola Kuleba was appointed to the position of the Commissioner of the President of Ukraine for Children's Rights by the decree of the President of Ukraine Petro Poroshenko.

=== United Kingdom ===
Separate agencies exist in the four UK jurisdictions.

- The post of Children's Commissioner for England was established under the Children Act 2004 as a non-departmental public body, and the current office holder is Rachel De Souza.
- The Children and Young People's Commissioner Scotland is Bruce Adamson. The office was established by the Commissioner for Children and Young People (Scotland) Act 2003.
- Rocío Cifuentes is the Children's Commissioner for Wales, an office established under the Children's Commissioner for Wales Act 2001.
- The Northern Ireland Commissioner for Children and Young People is currently Koulla Yiasouma; the office was established in 2003.

All four UK agencies are members of the British and Irish Network of Ombudsmen and Children’s Commissioners (BINOCC).

The 3 Crown Dependencies have equivalent offices.

- The Children’s Commissioner for Jersey is currently Dr Carmel Corrigan - the office was first established in 2024.
- In Guernsey, the Children’s Convenor is currently Karen Brady - the office was first established in 2010.
- In the Isle of Man, the Isle of Man Children’s Champion is currently Kerry Sharpe.

=== United States ===
There is no federal children's ombudsman agency, but some exist at state, city or county level. (In states where no children's ombudsman exists, similar work may be undertaken by a generic ombudsman office, by a social services advocacy service, or by a children's services oversight body.)

- In Connecticut, the Office of the Child Advocate is an independent ombudsman agency monitoring and evaluating the public and private agencies involved in the protection of children, and reviewing state policies and procedures to ensure they protect children's rights and promote their best interest.
- In Delaware, the Office of the Child Advocate aims to safeguard the welfare of children through educational advocacy, system reform, public awareness, training, and legal representation of children.
- The Georgia, Office of the Child Advocate aims to provide a first point of contact for those in government and the private sector to turn for advice, assistance, and aid regarding at-risk families and foster children in the state.
- The Maine, Child Welfare Services Ombudsman, also known as the Children's Ombudsman, is an impartial office which specialises in assisting people with resolving concerns with the Child Protective Services Department of the State's Department of Health and Human Services.
- In Massachusetts, the Office of the Child Advocate aims to ensure that every child involved with child welfare or juvenile justice agencies is protected from harm and receives appropriate and effective services delivered in a timely and respectful manner.
- The Michigan Department of Technology, Management and Budget maintains an Office of Children’s Ombudsman (OCO).
- Although not strictly a children's ombudsman, the Minnesota Office of the Ombudsperson for Families seeks to ensure that children and their families are guaranteed fair treatment, especially on racial grounds, by all agencies that provide child welfare services. There are four ombudspersons, working independently from but in collaboration with each of the following groups: the Indian Affairs Council, the Chicano Latino Affairs Council, the Council on Black Minnesotans, and the Council on Asian-Pacific Minnesotans.
- In Missouri, the Office of the Child Advocate is an independent part of the Office of Administration which operates independently from the Department of Social Services (DSS) Children's Division and other agencies. The Office of Child Advocate examines laws, policies, procedures, and practices regarding effective delivery of services to families and children by identifying issues and offering appropriate recommendations. The Office of Child Advocate investigates complaints about an agency action or failure to act and is authorized to make recommendations in cases involving any child at risk of abuse, neglect, or other harm, or children or families involved with child protection or child welfare services. The Office of Child Advocate can provide or coordinate mediation services between school districts and parents when allegations of child abuse arise in a school setting.
- In New Jersey, an Office of the Child Advocate was created as an independent watchdog in 2003 in the wake of scandals affecting the Division of Youth and Family Services. In 2010 the Republican governor, Chris Christie, abolished the office.
- There is no statewide body in Ohio, but a similar body at the local level is the Lucas County Children Services Ombudsman, which mediates to resolve problems related to the Children Services delivery system; the ombudsman can investigate complaints and make recommendations, but has no authority to make or reverse decisions.
- In Oregon, the Office of the Children's Advocate is a part of the Governor's Advocacy Office in the Oregon Department of Human Services and responds to concerns regarding child abuse and neglect, child protective services, and issues relevant to individual child welfare cases or general program practices.
- The Rhode Island, Office of the Child Advocate aims to protect the legal rights of children in state care and to promote policies and practices which ensure that children are safe; that children have permanent and stable families; and that children in out of home placements have their physical, mental, medical, educational, emotional, and behavioural needs met.
- In South Carolina, the Office of Children's Affairs within the Governor's Office provides ombudsman services on behalf of families and children by receiving inquiries, reviewing and responding to questions or problems involving or impacting children either directly or by referral, and providing information and referral to other services and resources.
- The Tennessee Commission on Children and Youth (TCCY) Ombudsman for Children, Youth and Families is an external problem resolution mechanism for children in the custody of the Department of Children's Services, relative caregiver program or Child Protective Services (CPS) system. TCCY has statutory authority to review children in the foster care system, kinship care or CPS and make recommendations for improvement. The Ombudsman helps to resolve problems mediating the concerns of each person involved in the child's or family's case. The Ombudsman may serve as an advocate for the family, the state, or the provider, but always works for the child's best interests.
- In Utah, the Office of Child Protection Ombudsman (OCPO) was established by the State Legislature to help resolve concerns about the protection of children receiving services from the Division of Child and Family Services (DCFS). The Ombudsman receives and investigates complaints.
- In Washington state, the Office of the Family and Children's Ombudsman investigates complaints about agency actions or inaction that involve any child at risk of abuse, neglect, or other harm and a child or parent involved with child protection or child welfare services. The Ombudsman can intervene in cases in which it has been determined that an agency's action or inaction is unauthorized or unreasonable. The office also works to identify system-wide issues and recommend appropriate changes to the Governor, the Legislature, and agency officials. An example of a local children's ombudsman service in Washington state is the Snohomish County Children's Commission.
- While there is no statewide service in Wisconsin, the Office of the Milwaukee Ombudsman for Child Welfare (OMOCW) is a free, public service that reviews case-specific concerns regarding the safety, permanence, and well-being of children and families involved with the Bureau of Milwaukee Child Welfare.
- While there is no statewide service in California, Los Angeles County operates the Youth Ombudsman Office. The Youth Ombudsman receives and investigates concerns/complaints regarding services, and provides advocacy, empowerment, mediation, information, and resource dissemination for and on behalf of the youth.
