= 2021 Australia Day Honours =

Appointments to orders and honours in Australia

The 2021 Australia Day Honours are appointments to various orders and honours to recognise and reward good works by Australian citizens. The list was announced on 26 January 2021 by the Governor General of Australia, David Hurley.

The Australia Day Honours are the first of the two major annual honours lists, the first announced to coincide with Australia Day (26 January), with the other being the Queen's Birthday Honours, which are announced on the second Monday in June.

== Order of Australia ==
Order of Australia civil ribbon

Order of Australia military ribbon

=== Companion of the Order of Australia (AC) ===
==== General Division ====
- The Reverend Margaret Court, AO, MBE – For eminent service to tennis as an internationally acclaimed player and record-holding grand slam champion, and as a mentor of young sportspersons.
- Rabbi Dr John Simon Levi, AM – For eminent service to Judaism through seminal roles with religious, community and historical organisations, to the advancement of interfaith understanding, tolerance and collaboration, and to education.
- Emeritus Professor Cheryl Elisabeth Praeger, AM – For eminent service to mathematics, and to tertiary education, as a leading academic and researcher, to international organisations, and as a champion of women in STEM careers.
- The Honourable Malcolm Bligh Turnbull – For eminent service to the people and Parliament of Australia, particularly as Prime Minister, through significant contributions to national security, free trade, the environment and clean energy, innovation, economic reform and marriage equality, and to business and philanthropy.

=== Officer of the Order of Australia (AO) ===
==== General Division ====
- Kenneth Craig Allen, AM – For distinguished service to international relations, particularly through global information sharing networks for expatriate Australian professionals.
- Professor Eileen Baldry – For distinguished service to tertiary education, to criminology and social welfare policy, and as an advocate for diversity, equity and inclusion.
- Timothy Filiga Cahill – For distinguished service to football as an elite player at the national and international level, and to charitable and sports organisations.
- Professor Alan Cass – For distinguished service to medical research, particularly to the prevention and management of chronic kidney disease, to improved Indigenous clinical care and health outcomes, and as a mentor.
- Gregory Chappell, MBE – For distinguished service to cricket as a leading player, captain, coach and administrator at the elite level, and to a range of charitable foundations.
- Professor William Neil Charman – For distinguished service to tertiary education, particularly to the pharmaceutical sciences, and to professional organisations.
- Charles George Clark – For distinguished service to the wine industry through leadership roles, to finance and business, to the arts, and to charitable initiatives.
- Professor Susan Ruth Davis – For distinguished service to medicine, to women's health as a clinical endocrinologist and researcher, and to medical education.
- Emeritus Professor Christopher Joseph Fell, AM – For distinguished service to science and engineering, particularly to nanotechnology research and fabrication, and to professional networks.
- Dr Kenneth Duncan Fitch, AM – For distinguished service to sports medicine at the national and international level through a range of roles, and to medical education.
- Professor Graham Clifford Goodwin – For distinguished service to tertiary education, and to electrical engineering, as an academic and researcher, and to scientific academies.
- Malcolm John Hazell, CVO, AM – For distinguished service to the Crown, and through a range of advisory and consultancy roles with government and business.
- Dr Barry David Inglis, PSM – For distinguished service to science and engineering, particularly to metrology, measurement standards and research, and to professional organisations.
- Robert Niven Johanson – For distinguished service to the banking sector, to Australia-India relations, and to tertiary education governance and financial administration.
- Professor Peter Jeffery Leedman – For distinguished service to medicine, health and medical research as a physician-scientist, to professional societies, and to tertiary education.
- Michael Douglas Mann, AM – For distinguished service to tertiary education through strategic development initiatives, and to Australia-South East Asia relations.
- Emeritus Professor Andrew Markus – For distinguished service to tertiary education, particularly to the study of Jewish civilisation, as a sociologist and demographer, and to multiculturalism.
- Professor Helene Marsh – For distinguished service to the biological and environmental sciences, to the conservation of marine mammals, and to tertiary education.
- Emeritus Professor Kathryn Marsh – For distinguished service to music education as an academic, researcher, author and mentor, and to professional musicological societies.
- Professor Paul Christopher Memmott – For distinguished service to ethno-architecture and anthropology, to Indigenous housing and cultural heritage, and to tertiary education.
- Samantha Joy Mostyn – For distinguished service to business and sustainability, and to the community, through seminal contributions to a range of organisations, and to women.
- Professor Robert Francis Moulds – For distinguished service to medicine, to clinical pharmacology and medical education, and to the development of therapeutic guidelines.
- The late Dr Brian John O'Brien – For distinguished service to science, particularly to lunar dust research, to tertiary education in the field of physics, and to the environment.
- Professor Helen O'Connell – For distinguished service to medical education, and to medicine, in the field of urology, as an academic and clinician, and to professional groups.
- Dr Sally Anne Pitkin – For distinguished service to business, to corporate governance standards and performance, to the arts, and to the advancement of women.
- Daryl Paul Quinlivan – For distinguished service to public administration through leadership roles in the areas of agriculture, water and the environment.
- Professor Mark Randolph – For distinguished service to geotechnical engineering and science, to tertiary education and research, and to professional organisations.
- Professor Roger Robert Reddel – For distinguished service to biomedical research in the field of adult and childhood cancer and genetics, and to tertiary education.
- Dr Russell Evan Reichelt – For distinguished service to marine conservation, to ecosystem management of the Great Barrier Reef, and to climate change research.
- The Honourable Trevor John Riley, QC – For distinguished service to the judiciary as Chief Justice of the Supreme Court of the Northern Territory, to the law, and to the community.
- Emeritus Professor Kay Elizabeth Saunders, AM – For distinguished service to tertiary education, particularly to history, as an academic and author, to professional associations, and to the community.
- Brenda Shanahan – For distinguished service to medical health research, to the business and finance sectors, to corporate governance, and to philanthropy.
- Bret William Walker – For distinguished service to the law through a range of roles, particularly to national security and civil liberties, and to professional legal associations.
- Gabriel Marie Waterhouse – For distinguished service to the thoroughbred horse racing industry, particularly as a leading trainer, and as a role model for young women.
- The Honourable Jay Weatherill – For distinguished service to the people and Parliament of South Australia, particularly as Premier, and to early childhood and tertiary education.

==== Military Division ====
===== Army =====
- Major General Roger John Noble, DSC, AM, CSC – For distinguished service in the appointments of Head Military Strategic Commitments, Deputy Chief Joint Operations and Deputy Commanding General United States Army Pacific.

===== Air Force =====
- Air Vice-Marshal Leigh Andrew Gordon, AM, CSM – For distinguished service in responsible positions in acquisition and sustainment of aerospace systems for the Australian Defence Force.

==== Honorary ====
- Chrissie Parrott – For distinguished service to the performing arts, particularly to dance, as a performer, choreographer and director, and through mentoring roles.

=== Member of the Order of Australia (AM) ===
==== General Division ====
- Lisa Michelle Alexander – For significant service to netball at the elite level.
- Professor Margaret Mary Alston, OAM – For significant service to tertiary education, to social sustainability, and to women.
- Professor Emily Banks – For significant service to medical research and education.
- Lawrence Geoffrey Barnett – For significant service to Australian rules football, and to little athletics.
- Donald Steele Barrett – For significant service to tertiary education, particularly to the classics and ancient history.
- Professor Ronald Ian Bartsch – For significant service to aviation law, and to safety and compliance.
- Judith Ann Bell – For significant service to the administration of justice, to the visual arts, and to education.
- Kerrin Benson – For significant service to the multicultural community, and to refugee settlement.
- Paula Benson – For significant service to people living with ovarian cancer, and to business.
- Kerry John Betros – For significant service to the banking sector, to the retail food industry, and to the community.
- Bernadette Black – For significant service to youth, to local government, and to the community.
- Hugh Burton Bradley – For significant service to the law, to the judiciary, and to the community.
- Associate Professor Anne Marie Brooks – For significant service to ophthalmology, and to eye health organisations.
- Associate Professor Douglas James Brown – For significant service to medicine, particularly to spinal cord injuries.
- Kirsty Margaret Brown, OAM – For significant service to youth through Scouts.
- Anne Gordon Burgess – For significant service to mental health, to gender equality, and to older persons.
- Amy Ellen Burow – For significant service to athletics, and through support for women and junior sportspersons.
- Ross James Burridge – For significant service to little athletics, and to the horse racing industry.
- Michael Raymond Buxton – For significant service to the visual arts, and to the property development sector.
- Georgina Byron – For significant service to the community, and to social change initiatives.
- Stephen James Byron – For significant service to the aviation infrastructure sector, and to tourism.
- Clyde Mark Campbell – For significant service to community health, particularly to people living with Parkinson's disease.
- Dr Peter Raymond Carroll – For significant service to pharmaceutical education, and to community health.
- The late Warwick George Cary, ESM – For significant service to emergency response organisations, and to military history and awards.
- Susan Gale Cato – For significant service to the contemporary arts, to women, and to social justice.
- Professor Michael Graham Chapman – For significant service to medical education, and to obstetrics and gynaecology.
- Susanne Valerie Clarke – For significant service to community health in regional Victoria.
- Dr David John Collins – For significant service to organic chemistry, and to tertiary education.
- Professor Robert Arthur Constable – For significant service to music education, to performance, and to composition.
- Peter Aubrey Cosier – For significant service to land conservation, and to natural resource management.
- Dr Paul Craft – For significant service to medicine, to oncology, and to professional organisations.
- Dr John Lionel Crompton, RFD – For significant service to ophthalmology, and to the community of the Asia-Pacific region.
- The late Dr James Thomas Cummins, RFD – For significant service to medicine, to neurosurgery, and to professional medical societies.
- William Reginald d'Apice – For significant service to the law, to the legal profession, and to the Catholic Church of Australia.
- Brian Myddleton Davis – For significant service to the community through philanthropic support for a range of organisations, and to business.
- Caroline de Mori – For significant service to remote Indigenous communities, and to land management.
- Radmila Desic – For significant service to women in the construction industry, and to unemployed youth.
- Lorrae Desmond, MBE – For significant service to the performing arts as an actor, entertainer and singer.
- Professor Jan Elizabeth Dickinson – For significant service to medical education, and to maternal fetal medicine.
- Kevin Wayne Ericksen – For significant service to medical science, and to pathology practice standards.
- Dr Gregory John Fealy – For significant service to tertiary education, and to Australia-Indonesia relations.
- Dr Denise Chasmar Fleming – For significant service to women in business through a range of roles.
- Elaine Forde – For significant service to the commercial retail sector, and to the community.
- Professor Amanda Jane Fosang – For significant service to medical research in the field of arthritis, and to international societies.
- Craig Foster – For significant service to multiculturalism, to human rights and refugee support organisations, and to football.
- Professor Margarita Maria Frederico – For significant service to tertiary education, to social work, and to the not-for-profit sector.
- Dr Susan Joan Gaffney – For significant service to dental professional organisations, and to education.
- Jillian Meredith Garner – For significant service to architecture, to professional associations, and to education.
- The late Garry Ronald Ginivan – For significant service to children's theatre as a producer and director.
- Associate Professor Gregory Julian Goodman – For significant service to medicine, to skin and cancer research, and to education.
- John Francis Gosling, OAM – For significant service to people who are blind or have low vision.
- Jeanette Lillian Gunn – For significant service to water polo at the elite level.
- Dr Jillian Anne Guthrie – For significant service to Indigenous health, and to justice reinvestment policy.
- Rabbi Mordechai Gutnick – For significant service to the Jewish community through a range of roles.
- Gregory Raymond Hall – For significant service to the people and Parliament of Tasmania, and to agriculture and horticulture.
- Dr Brenda Hamlett – For significant service to youth through Guides.
- Christopher Mark Hancock – For significant service to education and on-line research networks, and to Australia-USA relations.
- Basil Hanna – For significant service to children and families through a range of roles.
- Cathrine Harboe-Ree – For significant service to the library and information sciences.
- Helen Margaret Hargreaves – For significant service to youth through Guides.
- Fiona Elizabeth Harris – For significant service to the finance, investment, resources and not-for-profit sectors.
- Michael Bruce Hawkins – For significant service to the film and television industry, and to screen content.
- Barbara Jane Hingston – For significant service to community health, and to people with disabilities.
- Angus Alexander Hume – For significant service to water catchment management, and to agribusiness.
- Lindy Hume – For significant service to the performing arts, particularly to opera.
- Dr Michael David Humphrey – For significant service to medicine, particularly to obstetrics and gynaecology.
- Marie Frances (Fran) Hynes – For significant service to water skiing through a range of roles.
- Graeme Henry Irwin – For significant service to education, and to Christian schools associations.
- Genevieve Mary Jacobs – For significant service to the broadcast media, and to the community.
- The Honourable John Hughes Jobling, OAM – For significant service to the community, to first aid organisations, and to local government.
- Ann Jones – For significant service to people living with Huntington's disease, and their carers.
- Anthony John Joseph – For significant service to the fruit and vegetable industry, and to rugby league.
- Dr Stephen Edwin Judd – For significant service to older persons living with dementia.
- Yvonne Keane – For significant service to women and children, and to those who are deaf or hard of hearing.
- Peter Barry Kearns, OAM – For significant service to education, particularly to adult and lifelong learning.
- Professor Nicholas Alexander Keks – For significant service to tertiary education, to psychiatry, and to professional bodies.
- Richard Neil Kelloway – For significant service to air force organisations, and to veterans advocacy.
- Colonel William James Kelly (Retd) – For significant service to pharmacy through a range of roles.
- The late Maureen Anne Kerridge – For significant service to the television industry, to the arts, and to charitable organisations.
- Gerard Arthur King – For significant service to first responder organisations, to child safety, and to the community.
- Catherine Maree Kiss – For significant service to the parks and recreation industry, and to children's wellbeing.
- Hank Christiaan Laan – For significant service to the building and construction sectors.
- Professor Amanda Jane Leach – For significant service to ear disease research, and to Indigenous child health.
- Frances Joan Lefroy – For significant service to the community through philanthropic support initiatives.
- Dr George Allister Lefroy – For significant service to the community through philanthropic support initiatives.
- Valerie Kathleen Lehman – For significant service to the performing arts, and to wildlife conservation.
- Sotiria Liangis, OAM – For significant service to the community through philanthropic support initiatives.
- Dr Bruce Gregory Lister – For significant service to paediatric intensive care medicine, and to professional societies.
- Gerald Loughran – For significant service to the community of Tasmania through business, education and arts organisations.
- Professor Daniel Ian Lubman – For significant service to medical education, research, treatment and policy in the field of addiction.
- Enid Anne Macarthur, OAM – For significant service to the community through the Australian Red Cross.
- The Honourable John Alexander (Sandy) Macdonald – For significant service to the people and Parliament of Australia, and to public administration.
- The late Frank Charles Mallard – For significant service to the Indigenous community of Western Australia, and to veterans groups.
- Peter Stuart Marshall – For significant service to tertiary education administration, and to professional associations.
- Sarah Louise Matheson – For significant service to the law, to intellectual property protection, and to the not for profit sector.
- Frances Dawn Mathyssen – For significant service to the Indigenous community of Victoria, to women and children, and to health agencies.
- Neil Matthews – For significant service to aerospace component repair technologies.
- Philip David Mayers – For significant service to the community through a range of organisations.
- Dr John Phillip McCaffrey – For significant service to veterinary science, and to equine welfare.
- Emeritus Professor Ronald Douglas McEvoy – For significant service to medical research, particularly to respiratory and sleep health.
- Bruce Fulton McFarlane – For significant service to the community through a range of roles, and to business.
- Dr James Jip McGill – For significant service to metabolic medicine, to biochemical genetic pathology, and to medical education.
- Dr Perry Catherine McIntyre – For significant service to history preservation and genealogy organisations.
- Robert Samuel McKay – For significant service to the visual arts, and to publishing.
- Colin Bernard McKenna – For significant service to the community through a range of organisations.
- Emeritus Professor John Richard Melville-Jones – For significant service to tertiary education in Greek, Roman and Byzantine history and numismatics.
- Christina Fay Miller – For significant service to local government, to tourism, and to the community of Katherine.
- Megan Mitchell – For significant service to children, to human rights, and to wellbeing initiatives.
- Karen Murphy – For significant service to lawn bowls as an elite player at the international level.
- Professor Colleen Coyne Nelson – For significant service to medical research, particularly to prostate cancer, and to health organisations.
- The Reverend Norah Aliene Norris – For significant service to the Uniting Church in Australia, to religious education, and as a role model.
- The Reverend Dr Colleen Anne O'Reilly – For significant service to the Anglican Church of Australia, and to religious education.
- Dr Milton Edgeworth Osborne – For significant service to history as an author.
- Michael Panormitis Pakakis – For significant service to STEM education in Victoria.
- Sarah Briana Parry – For significant service to youth through ship restoration and sailing programs.
- John Peacock – For significant service to the associations and not-for-profit sectors through a range of initiatives.
- Winnie Martha Pelz – For significant service to arts administration, and to the community.
- Associate Professor Michael Gordon Penniment – For significant service to medicine, and to radiation oncology.
- Dr Patrick John Phillips – For significant service to medicine, and to diabetes organisations.
- Dr Tom Justin Playfair – For significant service to ophthalmology, and to professional colleges.
- Dr Ian Alfred Pollard – For significant service to business, to ethical standards, and to the community.
- Emeritus Professor Wilfrid Robertson Prest – For significant service to tertiary education, and to the law and legal history.
- Professor Lester Irabinna Rigney – For significant service to Indigenous education, and to social inclusion research.
- Marion Roseby Rivers – For significant service to eye health care, and to the community.
- Emeritus Professor Peter John Roberts-Thomson – For significant service to medical education, and to immunology.
- Dr Paul William Roche – For significant service to epidemiology, and to the international community of Nepal.
- Graham Alastair Ross – For significant service to the broadcast media, particularly to horticulture, and to the community.
- Kerry Chisholm Roxburgh – For significant service to the financial sector, and to women in business.
- Pamela Ann Rutledge – For significant service to people living with disability or social vulnerability.
- Dr Gerard Francis Ryan – For significant service to respiratory medicine, and to people living with cystic fibrosis.
- Emeritus Professor Wayne John Sampson – For significant service to dental education in the field of orthodontics.
- Dr David Edward Schuster – For significant service to medicine as an anaesthetist, and to the community of Dubbo.
- Dr Roy Frederick Scragg, OBE – For significant service to medicine, to epidemiology, and to professional medical associations.
- Professor Markus Joachim Seibel – For significant service to medical research, and to endocrinology.
- Dr Peter Jayalouchanan Selvaratnam – For significant service to physiotherapy, and to professional development.
- Professor Jonathan William Serpell – For significant service to medicine, particularly to endocrine surgery.
- Dr Robyn Marie Sheahan-Bright – For significant service to children's literature, and to the promotion of reading.
- Jill Harrison Smith – For significant service to the performing arts, and to cultural development.
- Dr Richard John Stawell – For significant service to ophthalmology, to research, and to professional bodies.
- Elizabeth Rose Swan – For significant service to the library and information sciences, and to professional associations.
- Dr Jeffrey Heow Joo Tan – For significant service to gynaecological medicine, and to cervical cancer research.
- Christine Tarascio – For significant service to medical research and charitable organisations.
- Commodore William Leonard Taylor, RAN (Retd.) – For significant service to the people and Parliament of Australia, and to public administration.
- Heather Anne Thompson – For significant service to surf lifesaving.
- Professor Johnstone William Thwaites – For significant service to the environment, and to the people and Parliament of Victoria.
- Norma Mary Tracey – For significant service to mental health, and to Indigenous children and their families.
- Dr Kevin William Vandeleur – For significant service to ophthalmology, and to the international community.
- Lorraine Annette Vass – For significant service to wildlife conservation, particularly of the koala.
- Dr Carden Crea Wallace – For significant service to marine science, and to museums and galleries.
- Kenneth Wayne Watkins – For significant service to the performing arts, particularly to ballet.
- Dr Ronald James Webber – For significant service to the building and construction sector.
- Christopher Paul Webster – For significant service to the law, to the legal profession, and to the community.
- The Honourable Patricia Lynne White – For significant service to engineering, and to the people and Parliament of South Australia.
- Allan Ernest Williams – For significant service to business tourism, and to the community.
- Daryl John Williams – For significant service to the legal profession, to the community, and to cancer research.
- Peter Harry Wise – For significant service to the Jewish community through a range of roles.

==== Military Division ====
===== Navy =====
- Rear Admiral Robert William Plath RAN – For exceptional service to the Royal Australian Navy in senior command and representational positions.
- Rear Admiral Katherine Anne Richards, CSC RAN – For exceptional performance of duty in Royal Australian Navy command and management positions.

===== Army =====
- Brigadier Ana Laura Duncan, CSC – For exceptional performance of duty as the Director Strategy, Plans and Assessments in Headquarters Combined Joint Task Force – Operation Inherent Resolve while deployed on Operation OKRA during 2019.
- Group Captain Angus Lindsay Porter – For exceptional service in air combat operations management, organisational development, and the strategic planning for the Australian Defence Force.
- Major General Murray Ronald Thompson, CSC – For exceptional performance of duty as Director Force Development – Army, and Commander Defence Strategic Communications.
- Warrant Officer Jennine Patricia Riches – For exceptional service in leadership and personnel welfare for the Australian Defence Force.
- Colonel John Andrew Simeoni, CSC – For exceptional performance of duty on operations through senior command, leadership and planning appointments in Iraq and Afghanistan.
- Colonel Nicholas Paul Surtees – For exceptional service to the Australian Defence Force in the reform and delivery of Military Policing capability.

===== Air Force =====
- Air Commodore Phillip John Champion – For exceptional service to the Australian Defence Force in international engagement and capability development.
- Group Captain Philip Richard Edwards – For exceptional service to the Australian Defence Force in the development and delivery of air power education.
- Wing Commander Randall Alexander McCutcheon – For exceptional service in support of the F-35 Joint Strike Fighter program in developmental and operational testing; and during the introduction of the F-35 capability into Australian service.

==== Honorary ====
- Antoni Robert Bonetti – For significant service to the performing arts as an orchestral conductor and musical director.
- Dr Alison Hilary Brand – For significant service to medicine, to gynaecology, and to medical organisations.
- Mary Lou Jelbart – For significant service to the performing and visual arts, and to the community.

=== Medal of the Order of Australia (OAM) ===
==== General Division ====
- Ralph Haldane Abbot – For service to the environment through weed eradication programs.
- Theodora Ahilas – For service to people affected by asbestos-related diseases, and to the law.
- Gary Race Aldridge – For service to veterans and their families.
- Ross Warwick Alexander – For service to the community through a range of charitable initiatives.
- The late Dr Adrian Christopher Allen – For service to tertiary education, and to the community of Toowoomba.
- Jay Allen – For service to people living with melanoma.
- Coralie Pearl Amos – For service to the community through a range of roles.
- Jill Argent – For service to cultural heritage and the arts in South Australia.
- Robert Jean Armessen – For service to the community through Rotary International.
- Dr Ruth Hope Arnold – For service to medicine as a cardiologist.
- The late Stanley Ian Artridge – For service to the wool industry, and to the community.
- Elizabeth Avery – For service to swimming.
- Sheryl Backhouse – For service to the sub-tropical fruit growing industry, and to the community.
- Robert William Bagnall – For service to the community through a range of roles.
- Samia Baho – For service to refugee welfare, and to the African community of Victoria.
- Colin Baillie – For service to Indigenous health and education.
- Danzal Baker – For service to the performing arts as a singer and musician.
- The late Dr Melissa Anne Baker – For service to people living with lymphoma.
- Raymond Fabian Bange – For service to paramedicine, to education, and to the community.
- The late Denise Merle Bannon – For service to the community, particularly youth and Indigenous people.
- Keith Hamilton Barber – For service to the community of Corowa.
- Tanya Barden – For service to business, and to the community.
- Gordon Barratt – For service to children with a disability and mental health issues, and their families.
- Heather Maeve Barrett – For service to sustainable urban design, and to environmental conservation.
- Neil Clifford Barrett – For service to sustainable urban design, and to environmental conservation.
- John Graham Barrett-Lennard – For service to art museum management and curatorial practice.
- The late Margaret Annette Bartkevicius-James – For service to dance, and to the community of Tasmania.
- Geoffrey Lewis Basser – For service to the community of the Port Stephens region.
- Roni Bau – For service to emergency response organisations.
- Geoffrey James Julian Beath – For service to the community of Canowindra.
- The late Anthony James Beavan – For service to children with autism.
- Rosemary Joan Bennett – For service to the wine industry, and to the community.
- Terence Michael Bennett – For service to the wine industry, and to the community.
- May Blacka – For service to the community of Cobargo.
- Steven Jeffrey Bloxham – For service to veterans and their families.
- Winitha Michelle Bonney – For service to women, to dance, and to the community.
- Timothy Daniel Bourne – For service to the administration of justice, and to the law.
- Dr James Henry Bowie – For service to medicine as a general practitioner.
- Joy Boyd – For service to table tennis.
- Thomas Jack Boyd – For service to table tennis.
- Dr Robert Michael Braham – For service to choral music.
- The late Nelly Brandsma – For service to rowing.
- Lino Domenic Bresciani – For service to the performing arts, and to young singers and musicians.
- Alfred John Britton – For service to conservation and the environment.
- Dragoljub Brkljac – For service to youth, and to the community.
- Grace Brodie – For service to equestrian sports through a range of roles.
- Kenneth George Broughton – For service to lawn bowls.
- Douglas James Brown – For service to veterans and their families.
- The late Rex Brown – For service to tourism, and to the community of Wye River.
- Calvin Thomas Bruton – For service to basketball as a player and coach.
- Margaret Burke – For service to netball.
- Maxwell Arthur Burr – For service to the Parliament of Australia, and to the community of Tasmania.
- John Thomas Burton – For service to the community of Wilmot.
- Norman Samuel Burton – For service to the community through support for a range of charitable organisations.
- Colin Butcher – For service to the rail transport industry.
- Andrew John Butler – For service to the community of Bairnsdale.
- The late Neil Leslie Byrne – For service to the study of labour history.
- Kym Leslie Callaghan – For service to local government, and to the community of Elliston.
- Dr Patricia Elizabeth Canning – For service to the community, to nursing, and to aged care.
- Bruce Hasting Carfrae – For service to the community through a range of roles.
- Wendy Carver – For service to community mental health.
- Richard Patrick Chadwick – For service to the building and construction industry.
- Patricia Mary Chigwidden – For service to local government, and to the community of Victor Harbor.
- The late Donald Michael Chisholm – For service to the community through a range of roles.
- Robert Chizzoniti – For service to small business operators in the postal industry.
- Barry Charles Clarke – For service to people who are blind or have low vision.
- Stephen John Clarke – For service to the community of the Central Coast.
- David Coluccio – For service to people living with Cystic Fibrosis, and to the community.
- John Robert Corless – For service to Australian rules football in Queensland.
- Pastor Robert John Cotton – For service to the community as an advocate for child protection legislation.
- Susanne Elizabeth Course – For service to conservation and the environment, and to the visual arts.
- Norma Catherine Cowper – For service to the community through a range of roles.
- Peter John Crisp – For service to the creative arts, particularly as a glass sculptor.
- Dr Carmel Crock – For service to emergency medicine, and to medical education.
- Graeme Phillip Crofts – For service to the community of Coffs Harbour.
- Neil Bridgeman Cromarty – For service to veterans, and to the community.
- Ronald Frank Crouch – For service to community, and to the road transport industry.
- Peter Michael Crowe – For service to the softwood plantation industry.
- The late Margaret Dorothy Cunningham – For service to women and girls, and to the community.
- Dr Peter James Davis – For service to the Jewish community of Melbourne.
- Brenda Mary De Bes – For service to youth through Scouts.
- Francis Mervyn Deane – For service to people with a disability, and to the community.
- The late Gordon Carlyle Dendle – For service to the community of Leopold.
- Diana Jill Dick – For service to bridge through a range of roles.
- Christopher Diener – For service to people with a disability, and to youth through Scouts.
- David Dinh – For service to the Vietnamese community of the Northern Territory, and to horticulture.
- Valerie Dix – For service to the community, particularly to children with mobility issues.
- Angel Dixon – For service to people with a disability, and to social inclusion.
- Gordon Raymond Druitt – For service to the rice growing sector, and to the community.
- Ronald Peter Duncan – For service to the community of Stansbury.
- Eric Easterbrook – For service to the community, particularly to war widows and their families.
- Frank England – For service to the community of the Kingston district.
- Dr Bruce Englefield – For service to the protection of Tasmanian Devils and Australian fauna, and to the community.
- Dr Susan English-Donkers – For service to the youth of Timor-Leste, to women, and to medicine.
- John Robert Evans – For service to bushwalking, and to the community.
- Christine Susan Fairbrother – For service to children, and to the community.
- Aldo Fedel – For service to choral music as a conductor and director.
- David James Fleming – For service to the community, particularly through first aid organisations.
- William Lawrance Fogarty – For service to the community of Adaminaby, and to military history.
- Barbara Dawn Forrest – For service to lawn bowls.
- Patricia Grace Fortier – For service to youth through Scouts, and to the community.
- Wendy Jayne Gaborit – For service to the community of the Murray Bridge region.
- Kevin Boyd Gartrell – For service to cricket.
- The late Gregory Keith Gibson – For service to people with a disability through tennis.
- Phillip Lloyd Gibson – For service to the community of Nyngan.
- Julie Anne Gillick – For service to education, and to professional associations.
- The Reverend Bryan Leslie Gilmour – For service to the Uniting Church in Australia.
- Perry Earle Gilsenan – For service to people with Down Syndrome.
- Mark Ginsburg – For service to the Jewish community, and to music.
- Ronald Thomas Glew – For service to veterans and their families, and to the community.
- Eleni Andriana Glouftsis – For service to Australian rules football, particularly as an umpire.
- Graeham Goble – For service to the performing arts as a singer, songwriter and producer.
- Paul Goener – For service to rugby league as a referee.
- Peter Gerard Gogarty – For service to the community through support for survivors of childhood abuse.
- Geoffrey William Goode – For service to the community as an advocate for electoral reform.
- Laurence Geoffrey Graham – For service to surf lifesaving, and to the community.
- Allan Robert Gray – For service to the community through social welfare organisations.
- Ellen Greenfield – For service to the fashion and textiles industries, and to the community.
- The late Andrew Sladen Gubbins – For service to the beef cattle industry.
- Lis Guldager-Nielsen – For service to the community of Lilydale.
- Peter Thomas Gurr – For service to the community, and to palliative care organisations.
- George Theodore Habel – For service to veterans and their families.
- Allan James Hagan – For service the community of Tennant Creek.
- John Patrick Hagan – For service the community of Tennant Creek.
- Miriam Anne Hagan – For service the community of Tennant Creek.
- Patricia Mary Hagan – For service the community of Tennant Creek.
- Christine Joan Halbert – For service to the history of Australian rules football, and to music.
- Robert John Hale – For service to education, and to the community.
- Anders Sydney Halvorsen – For service to people with a disability, and to the community.
- David Wyndham Hamilton – For service to medicine, and to professional associations.
- Georgina June Hanley – For service to war widows and their families.
- Irma Hanner – For service to the community, particularly through the Jewish Holocaust Centre.
- Gloria Ann Hansen – For service to the community, and to youth as a foster carer.
- Brady Haran – For service to the broadcast and on-line media.
- Emeritus Professor John Philips Hardy – For service to tertiary education, particularly to the humanities.
- Wendy Marcia Hardy – For service to the Indigenous community of Grafton.
- Jeffery Lorrie Harrison – For service to youth through Scouts.
- Colin Eric Hartley – For service to the community of Mandurah.
- Abdul Rahman Hashim – For service to the multicultural community of the Australian Capital Territory.
- Philip Bruce Heaton – For service to coastal landcare conservation.
- David Helfgott – For service to the performing arts as a concert pianist.
- Warren Leslie Hewitt – For service to community health through welfare support groups.
- Kenneth William Higgins – For service to veterans and their families.
- Professor Tammy Coral Hoffmann – For service to clinical epidemiology, and to occupational therapy.
- Brian John Hollins, CSC – For service to war widows and their families.
- Philip Holmes-Smith – For service to education, particularly to research and evaluation.
- Frank Holohan – For service to the community of Dandenong, and to local government.
- Colin John Hopkins – For service to science education, particularly to physics.
- Wanda Horky – For service to the Polish community in Australia.
- Norman Houghton – For service to community history.
- Janet Ann Howard – For service to cricket.
- Leslie Vincent Hughes – For service to veterans, and to the community.
- James Henry Hugo – For service to the community of South Australia.
- Azmeena Hussain – For service to the community of Victoria, and to the law.
- The late Dr Jenni Ibrahim – For service to community health.
- Judith Ann Ingham – For service to the community, and to pharmacy.
- Elizabeth James – For service to the Jewish community of Victoria.
- Ellis Janks – For service to people with a disability through exercise.
- Geoffrey Jochelson – For service to the building and construction industry, particularly security of payment.
- John Douglas Kearns – For service to the community through a range of roles.
- Mathew Roy Keene – For service to veterans and their families.
- Roy Kelley – For service to education, and to professional associations.
- Dr Jeffrey Stevens Kemp – For service to youth through counselling and sporting programs.
- William Richard Kennedy – For service to junior rugby league football.
- Lisa Kingman McGlinchey – For service to business and community engagement initiatives.
- Janet Dorothy Kneeshaw – For service to the performing arts, and to the community.
- Trevor James Knuckey – For service to the community through a range of roles.
- Larry Hyam Kornhauser – For service to eye health research, and to people with keratoconus.
- Dr Philip Glencoe Laird – For service to the rail freight and passenger transport industry.
- Terence Hugh Larkins, PSM – For service to the community, and to local government.
- John Joseph Lazberger – For service to the community through social welfare organisations.
- Robert James Leedow, RFD ED – For service to veterans, and to the community.
- Patricia Ruth Letts – For service to nursing.
- Dr Henry Ronald Lew – For service to ophthalmology, and to the Jewish community.
- Wendy Anne Lewis – For service to the not-for-profit sector, and to education.
- The late Rita Ngare Little – For service to animal welfare, and to canine breeding clubs.
- Robert Lloyd – For service to children with a disability.
- Dr Richard Kok Siong Loh – For service to medicine, particularly to clinical immunology.
- Dr Judith Carmen Lynch – For service to medicine, particularly to anaesthesiology.
- Katherine Cameron Macarthur – For service to community health, and to nursing.
- Max Machlin – For service to the community of Perth through a range of roles.
- Kathryn Mackenzie – For service to tourism in regional Victoria.
- Paul Anthony Maguire – For service to the community through a range of roles.
- Sacha Michael Mahboub – For service to the performing arts.
- Peter Maher – For service to education, particularly to mathematics.
- The late Ernest John Maltby – For service to the community of Bowen.
- Amanda Mandie – For service to the community through charitable organisations.
- Jeremy David Mansfield – For service to the building and construction industry.
- Graeme George Manson – For service to veterans, and to the community.
- John Clifford Martin – For service to education through administrative roles.
- Susan Christine Martin – For service to the community of Pittwater.
- Gary Bruce Mason – For service to veterans and their families.
- Stephen Matthews – For service to publishing.
- David Henry Mattiske – For service to veterans and their families, and to the community.
- Ian Mayer – For service to the community through charitable organisations.
- Lynn McCrindle – For service to children, and to education.
- John Robert McDonald – For service to the sustainable timber sector, and to the community.
- Dr Michael Joseph McDonald – For service to the Catholic Church, and to the community.
- Suzanne Margaret McInnes – For service to the community of Queanbeyan.
- Catherine McKechnie – For service to the Uniting Church in Australia, and to the trade union movement.
- Shirley McLaren – For service to veterans and their families, and to the community.
- Norma McLeod – For service to the community of Maleny.
- Frederick James McMahon – For service to Australian rules football.
- Brian Francis McMennemin – For service to music through brass bands.
- Mary Jo McVeigh – For service to the community through social welfare organisations.
- Dr Ronald Gordon Meikle – For service to medicine, particularly to radiology.
- The late Geoffrey William Melville – For service to the community through a range of roles.
- Kenneth John Mewburn – For service to conservation and the environment.
- Lois Michel – For service to the community through heritage societies.
- Shirley Anne Miller – For service to the community through social welfare organisations.
- Richard Mitchell – For service to surf lifesaving.
- Nadia Emilia Moffatt – For service to community health, particularly to people with a brain injury.
- Garry Anthony Molloy – For service to education.
- Simon Edward Moore – For service to the broadcast media, and to the community.
- The late Dr Amarjit Singh More – For service to medicine, and to the local and Sikh communities of Woolgoolga.
- Brett Matthew Morgan – For service to the performing arts, particularly to dance.
- David Gordon Morgan – For service to the wool industry.
- Dr Frederick Morgan – For service to medicine as a general practitioner.
- Professor Tracey Lynn Moroney – For service to medical education, particularly to nursing.
- Desmond John Morris – For service to rugby league.
- Rosemary Morrow – For service to permaculture.
- Ian Murray – For service to community history in Western Australia.
- Neil Charles Musch – For service to emergency response organisations.
- Dr Anandhan Perumal Naidoo – For service to paediatric medicine.
- Dr David Alan Nelson – For service to medicine, and to the community.
- Frances Campbell Nicholls, MBE – For service to the community through a range of roles.
- Claire Adrienne O'Callaghan – For service to the community through charitable organisations.
- Elizabeth O'Carrigan – For service to education in New South Wales.
- James David O'Dea – For service to the wine industry, and to the community of Canowindra.
- Noel John O'Halloran – For service to rugby league.
- Kevin O'Neill – For service to cricket.
- Michael Edward O'Neill – For service to the rejuvenation of inland rivers.
- Steven Allen Ostrow – For service to the LGBTIQ community, and to the performing arts.
- Dr David Leslie Outridge – For service to medicine, particularly to addiction recovery programs.
- The late Neville Owen – For service to the community of Coonamble.
- David Sydney Palmer – For service to conservation and the environment.
- The late Ismini (Pitsa) Parrett – For service to community health through exercise therapy and aquatic rehabilitation.
- Leslie Parsons – For service to the community of Inverell, and to local government.
- The late Graeme Allan Paul – For service to the community of the Northern Beaches, and to chemical engineering.
- Michelle Payne – For service to the horse racing industry.
- The late Kevin John Pearce – For service to the community of Wyong through a range of roles.
- The Reverend Dr John Alexander Pender – For service to the Uniting Church in Australia, and to education.
- Elsie May Penny – For service to Indigenous community health.
- Anthony (Ray) Pereira – For service to the performing arts as a percussionist, performer and composer.
- Timothy Alan Phillips – For service to sailing, and to wooden boat restoration.
- Howard Charles Pickering – For service to the community of Brisbane.
- Lorraine Mary Pickering – For service to the community of Brisbane.
- Andrew Pinxt – For service to the community through a range of roles.
- David William Plant – For service to botanic gardens, and to ornithology.
- Lea Portrate – For service to the Jewish community of Sydney.
- Lorraine Elva Powell – For service to the community of Ballarat.
- Toby Price – For service to motorsport, particularly to cross country motorcycle racing.
- Ronda Quinn – For service to the community through citizens advocacy organisations.
- Jeannette Maud Rainbow – For service to the community of Wauchope.
- John Cecil Raine – For service to the community through a range of roles.
- Osman Ali Rane – For service to the Islamic community of Queensland.
- Joe Rechichi – For service to the community through charitable initiatives.
- Craig James Reece – For service to cricket.
- Gaynor Elsie Reeves – For service to women, and to the community of Newcastle.
- Peter Thomas Reilly – For service to the community through cultural organisations, and to business.
- Janice Margaret Reu – For service to people living with leukaemia, and to seniors.
- Bruce Reynolds – For service to little athletics.
- Dr Barbara Doris Reynolds-Hutchinson – For service to the Catholic community of Brisbane.
- Desley Rial – For service to the community of the Capricorn Coast.
- Marie Frances Rinaldi – For service to people with a disability, and to the community of Ballarat.
- William John Rinaldi – For service to people with a disability, and to the community of Ballarat.
- Neil Rogers – For service to community radio as a presenter.
- David Rosenberg – For service to publishing.
- Merrin Ross – For service to the performing arts, particularly to musical theatre.
- Peter David Rostron – For service to the community of Tea Tree Gully.
- Dr Susan Rowley – For service to medicine, and to emergency rescue organisations.
- Dr Hilary Louise Rubinstein – For service to community history through a range of roles.
- John Russell – For service to Australian Antarctic research expeditions as an engineer.
- Thomas Kevin Ryan – For service to medical research, and to rugby union.
- Megan Ruth Rynderman – For service to people living with cancer, and to the community.
- George Said – For service to the community of Hobsons Bay.
- Felix William Sainsbury – For service to yachting.
- Neil Howard Samuel – For service to people living with dementia, and to the community.
- Gregory Lauchlan Sanderson – For service to the community through philanthropic and fundraising roles.
- Helen Margaret Sandow – For service to the communities of Peterborough and Nuriootpa.
- Roger Philip Sayers – For service to surf lifesaving.
- Marcia Charlotte Scholes – For service to the community, and to the Anglican Church of Australia.
- Dr Christopher Robert Schull – For service to thoracic and tropical medicine, and to the community.
- Judith Ann Schull – For service to community health in the tropics, particularly in Papua New Guinea.
- Carley Scott – For service to the space industry, and to the community of the Northern Territory.
- Dr David Mickle Scott – For service to medicine, particularly to anaesthetics.
- The late Douglas Robert Scott – For service to the community through a range of roles.
- Geoffrey Campbell Scott – For service to education, and to professional associations.
- The late Joan Violet Scott – For service to the community, and to youth.
- Norma Kathleen Seip – For service to community health through advocacy and advisory roles.
- The late Carol Soundararani Selva Rajah – For service to the hospitality industry, and to culinary tourism.
- Edwina Sharrock – For service to community health in the Hunter area.
- Bronwyn Sheehan – For service to youth, particularly to children in foster care.
- Patricia Rose Shepherd – For service to nursing, to veterans, and to gerontology.
- William Stuart Sherman – For service to public relations, to sport, and to the community.
- Norman Charles Shrubsole – For service to the community through a range of roles.
- Janet Simmons – For service to youth through Guides, and to the community.
- Renata Singer – For service to the community through cultural, Jewish and women's organisations.
- Kenneth Lindsay Skews – For service to the community through a range of roles.
- Robert David Slater – For service to the community of Herberton.
- Robert John Sloane – For service to local government, and to the community of the Barossa Valley.
- Bernard Smith – For service to the community of North Balwyn, and to cricket.
- The late Maurice Smith – For service to the community, and to motorsport.
- Ross Donald Smyth-Kirk – For service to business, and to the community.
- Raymond Hartley Smythe – For service to people with an intellectual disability through employment initiatives.
- Margot Elizabeth Spalding – For service to the community of Bendigo.
- Thomas Spark – For service to squash as a coach and player.
- Patricia Stacey – For service to horticulture, particularly to the fruit growing sector.
- The late Jennifer Lesley Steinicke – For service to botanic gardens.
- The late The Reverend Father Paul Francis Stenhouse – For service to the Catholic Church of Australia.
- Amanda Stephan – For service to nursing, particularly to child and maternal health.
- Alison Stillwell – For service to the community of Kingston.
- Barbara Joan Street – For service to the community of the Shellharbour region.
- Patrick Denis Street – For service to the law, and to the community.
- Avi Susskind – For service to the Jewish community of Melbourne.
- Beryl Sutherland – For service to sport, and to the community of Armadale.
- Keith Sutherland – For service to the community of Bendigo.
- Robert Sutherland – For service to sport, and to the community of Armadale.
- Anthony Phillip Swan – For service to the Sri Lankan community of Queensland.
- Robin Sweet – For service to veterans and their families.
- Julie Sydenham – For service to the creative arts.
- Paul Austin Talbot – For service to local government, and to the community of Corowa.
- Ross Philip Tapper – For service to motor sports.
- Beverley Elaine Taylor – For service to the community as a church organist.
- Duncan Grant Taylor, RFD ED – For service to youth.
- Patrick Francis Tehan, QC – For service to the law, and to the legal profession.
- Suzanne (Sue) Constance Thompson – For service to music education in Queensland.
- Fiona Marie Thomson – For service to youth through Guides, and to academic librarianship.
- Vicki Maree Tiegs – For service to the community of the Illawarra.
- Samuel Nelson Todhunter – For service to aviation.
- Gary Desmond Tomlins, ESM – For service to marine rescue organisations, and to the community.
- Frederick Vernon Treble – For service to the community of Maryborough.
- Barbara Jean Try – For service to the creative arts, particularly to lapidary.
- John Michael Tyquin – For service to sailing, to the community, and to business.
- Alistair Urquhart – For service to people with a disability through employment initiatives.
- Maria (Luisa) Valmorbida – For service to the Italian community of Victoria.
- Dr Sheryl Anne Van Nunen – For service to medicine, particularly to clinical immunology and allergy.
- George Anthony Voyage – For service to amateur Australian rules football and cricket.
- The late Leonard John Wagner – For service to the community of Merbein.
- George Roger Wainwright – For service to veterans.
- Ronald Alister Wallace – For service to youth through Scouts.
- Jamie Malcolm Wallis – For service to the mining sector, and to railway heritage.
- Michael Walsh – For service to cricket.
- Anne Josephine Ward – For service to the community of Canowindra.
- Mark Andrew Ward – For service to the community of Canowindra.
- Peter McKenzie Warner – For service to cricket, and to Australian rules football.
- David Anthony Watters – For service to the history of law enforcement in the Northern Territory.
- Associate Professor David Rowan Webb – For service to medicine, particularly to urological surgery.
- Ronald William Webb – For service to the community of Wangaratta.
- Bexon Whang – For service to veterans of the Korean War.
- Glenn Anthony Wheeler – For service to the broadcast media, and to the community.
- Rodney John Whyte – For service to pharmacy, to professional societies, and to the community.
- Alan George Wickes – For service to the community of Frankston, and to Australian rules football.
- Peter Barry Wicking – For service to education, and to youth mental health.
- Clive Wilderspin – For service to tennis.
- Rosalind Williams – For service to the law, and to the performing arts.
- Dr John Garth Willoughby – For service to ophthalmology, and to sailing.
- Sally-Anne (Sally) Wise – For service to the hospitality and culinary sectors, and to the community.
- Anthony Wood – For service to rugby league, and to the community.
- Stanley Arthur Woodley – For service to lawn bowls.
- Katie Lisa Woolf – For service to the broadcast media in the Northern Territory.
- Jacqueline Ann Wright – For service to the community through charitable initiatives.
- Dr John Glover Youngman – For service to medicine, and to medical administration.
- Raouf Zaki Youssef – For service to the Coptic Orthodox Church in Victoria.
- Souria Khalil Youssef – For service to the Coptic Orthodox Church in Victoria.

==== Military Division ====
===== Navy =====
- Principal Chaplain Collin Gregory Acton RAN – For meritorious service to the Royal Australian Navy in the field of Chaplaincy.
- Captain Stephen Beckmann, CSC RAN – For meritorious service in the field of Defence strategic communications.
- Warrant Officer Sherylee Georgette Folkes – For meritorious service to the Royal Australian Navy in leadership roles at sea and ashore.
- Warrant Officer Matthew Ian Hurley – For meritorious service in the fields of Clearance Diving and leadership as a Warrant Officer in the Royal Australian Navy.
- Captain Stephen John Hussey RAN – For meritorious performance of duty in the fields of submarine operations, training and capability development.
- Chief Petty Officer Jeremy Mark Pitchford – For meritorious service in the field of maritime Communications and Information Systems support.
- Chief Petty Officer Daniel Anthony Ryan – For meritorious service as an Armidale Class Patrol Boat Marine Technician while deployed on Operation RESOLUTE from 2007 to 2020.

===== Army =====
- Warrant Officer Class One Michael James Bates – For meritorious service in the appointments of Regimental Sergeant Major 21st Construction Regiment, Regimental Sergeant Major 3rd Combat Engineer Regiment; Career Adviser Royal Australian Engineers and Regimental Sergeant Major Army Ceremonial.
- Warrant Officer Class One Paul Michael Casey CSM – For meritorious service as the Command Chief Clerk at Headquarters Forces Command, the Command Chief Clerk at Headquarters 2nd Division and as a Defence One Module Coordinator within the Army People Capability Branch.
- Warrant Officer Class One Sean William Chainey, DSM – For meritorious service as the Regimental Sergeant Major of the Royal Australian Engineers and the 2nd Combat Engineer Regiment.
- Warrant Officer Class One Paul Richard Davies – For meritorious service in Band Sergeant Major positions, as a Career Advisor in the Directorate of Soldier Career Management – Army, and as Regimental Sergeant Major – Australian Army Band.
- Warrant Officer Class One John Robert Franklin – For meritorious service as the Band Sergeant Major of the Band of the 1st Regiment, Royal Australian Artillery.
- Warrant Officer Class One Stephen Robert Hill CSM – For meritorious service as the Squadron Sergeant Major of the 1st Topographical Survey Squadron; Career Manager at the Directorate of Soldier Career Management – Army and Warrant Officer Class One Military Geospatial Intelligence in Army Headquarters.

===== Air Force =====
- Warrant Officer Shane William Grist – For meritorious performance of duty in aircrew survival training and infrastructure redevelopment at the Royal Australian Air Force Combat Survival Training School.
- Wing Commander Ian Grant Murphy, CSC – For meritorious service in Work Health and Safety for the Royal Australian Air Force.

==== Honorary ====
- Robert George Blackmore – For service to veterans and their families.
- Peter Denzil Craighead – For service to rural health administration.
- Colin James Llewellyn – For service to the Presbyterian Church of Australia.
- Melodie Potts Rosevear – For service to education, particularly to teacher development.
- Marlene Mary Skipper – For service to the community of Marulan.
- Jennifer Shutt Walsh – For service to community health, particularly to palliative care.

== Meritorius Service ==
=== Public Service Medal (PSM) ===
Public Service Medal ribbon

==== Federal ====
- Dr Richard Symons Blewett – For outstanding public service through advancing the use of geophysical data to attract investment in Australia's minerals industry
- Caroline Ann Edwards – For outstanding public service to the development and implementation of health and social policy, and leading the Government's health response to COVID-19.
- Dr Marion Joy Healy – For outstanding public service to policy and regulatory practice including in the areas of food, chemicals and plant biosecurity.
- Rachel Joy Henry – For outstanding public service to the development and implementation of the National Consumer Protection Framework for Online Wagering.
- Dr Doug Marmion – For outstanding public service through the strengthening of Indigenous language infrastructure.
- Lisa Schofield – For outstanding public service in the delivery of the treaty establishing maritime boundaries between Australia and Timor-Leste.
- Andrew Shaw Todd – For outstanding public service through the development and implementation of Australian Government policy on consular matters, and the response to offshore crises.
- Paul David Way – For outstanding public service through the development of programs which support current, and transitioning, Australian Defence Force members and their families.
- Jennifer Elizabeth Wilkinson – For outstanding public service in the development of fiscal policy, particularly in the formulation of the Australian Government's economic response to COVID-19.

==== New South Wales ====
- Lewis Bezzina – For outstanding public service to the Lithgow City Council, particularly during the 2019–2020 bushfires.
- Sally Anne Bryant – For outstanding public service to Legal Aid New South Wales, particularly during the 2019–2020 bushfires.
- Dr Armand Casolin – For outstanding public service to rail transport in New South Wales, particularly to the development of safe working protocols during COVID-19.
- Stephen Bruce Cathcart – For outstanding public service to the National Parks and Wildlife Service, particularly to the protection of the Wollemi Pines during the 2019–2020 bushfires.
- Terrance James Clout – For outstanding public service to New South Wales Health.
- Stephen Michael Durnford – For outstanding public service to building regulation in New South Wales.
- Susan Denise French – For outstanding public service to education in New South Wales.
- Lisa Patricia Gardner – For outstanding public service to the New South Wales Police Force.
- Jody Marie Grima – For outstanding public service to the community through Service New South Wales.
- Kate Gwendolyne Hackett – For outstanding public service to health care delivery in Western Sydney.
- Anita Carol Hawtin – For outstanding public service to the New South Wales Public Service Commission.
- Natasha Rosemary Luschwitz – For outstanding public service to emergency crisis management in New South Wales.
- Charles Cameron Maclachlan – For outstanding public service to local government in New South Wales, particularly during the emergency response to the 2019 bush fires.
- Dr Paul Brian Wood – For outstanding public service to education in New South Wales.
- Sarah Anne Wylie – For outstanding public service to regional New South Wales, particularly to community recovery programs following the 2019–2020 bushfires.

==== Victoria ====
- Wilma Veronica Culton – For outstanding public service to education in Victoria.
- Lynn Glover – For outstanding public service to education and training in Victoria.
- Fern Michele Hames – For outstanding public service to nature conservation in Victoria.
- Dr David Colin Howes – For outstanding public service to education in Victoria.
- Ian Ireson John – For outstanding public service to land titles process and product innovation in Victoria.
- Anthony Philip Murphy – For outstanding public service to vocational education and training in Victoria.
- Karyn Lee Myers – For outstanding public service to youth justice custodial services in Victoria.
- An Luu Nguyen – For outstanding public service to major infrastructure delivery in Victoria.

==== Queensland ====
- Gordon James Buchanan – For outstanding public service to the transport sector in Queensland.
- Suzanne Coxon – For outstanding public service to child protection and family violence policy development in Queensland.
- Shannon Lee Gibbs – For outstanding public service to local government in Queensland through financial management roles.
- Anthony Martin O'Dea – For outstanding public service to rural and industry financial assistance in Queensland.
- Peter Anthony Shaddock – For outstanding public service to Corrective Services in Queensland.
- Josephine Louise Whitehead – For outstanding public service to health care in northern Queensland.

==== South Australia ====
- Sarah Moore – For outstanding public service to cancer pathology science in South Australia.
- Ermioni (Erma) Ranieri – For outstanding public service to people management, and to public sector reform, in South Australia.
- Dr Duncan Alexander Taylor – For outstanding public service to forensic DNA statistics in South Australia.

==== Western Australia ====
- Police Chaplain Keith John Carmody – For outstanding public service to the Western Australia Police Forces through chaplaincy roles.
- Nicholas Anthony Egan – For outstanding public service as State Solicitor of Western Australia.
- Vicki Joy McKeown – For outstanding public service to education in Western Australia.

==== Australian Capital Territory ====
- Mark Huxley – For outstanding public service to education in the Australian Capital Territory.
- Anita Perkins – For outstanding public service to strategic communications and community engagement in the Australian Capital Territory.
- Narelle Joy Rivers – For outstanding public service through improved outcomes for Aboriginal and Torres Strait Islander people in the Australian Capital Territory.

==== Northern Territory ====
- Dr Hugh Crosbie Heggie – For outstanding public service to community health in the Northern Territory.
- Jodie Elizabeth Ryan – For outstanding public service to the community of the Northern Territory through a range of roles.

=== Australian Police Medal (APM) ===
Australian Police Medal ribbon

==== Australian Federal Police ====
- Assistant Commissioner Fiona Caroline Drennan
- Detective Sergeant Bernard Joseph Geason
- Sergeant Craig Cameron McPherson

==== New South Wales Police Force ====
- Detective Superintendent Jonathan Andrew Beard
- Inspector Gary John Coffey
- Sergeant Lisa Maree Green
- Chief Inspector Joseph Anthony McNulty
- Sergeant Brett Raymond Samuel
- Superintendent Paul Andrew Smith
- Chief Inspector Peter Francis Volf
- Sergeant Scott David Weber

==== Victoria Police ====
- Superintendent Joy Elizabeth Arbuthnot
- Sergeant Trevor John Blake
- Detective Sergeant Kevin Francis Carson
- Inspector Stephen Kenneth Frost
- Detective Leading Senior Constable Darren Gleeson
- Commander Paul Michael Millett
- Superintendent Rebecca Jane Olsen
- Sergeant Jonathan Patrick Payne
- Superintendent Adrian Joseph White

==== Queensland Police Service ====
- Superintendent Melissa Lesly Adams
- Inspector Paul Lindsay Baker
- Sergeant Cary Ellen Coolican
- Detective Inspector David Charles Hickey
- Superintendent Mark Alan Kelly
- Sergeant Nadine Webster

==== South Australia Police ====
- Chief Inspector Colin James Cunningham
- Detective Superintendent Kym David Hand
- Chief Superintendent Paul Matthew Ralphs

==== Western Australia Police ====
- Superintendent Roger David Beer
- Superintendent Glenn Desmond Feeney
- Brevet Senior Sergeant Sheryl Roberta Jackamarra
- Acting Commander Bradley William Sorrell

==== Tasmania Police ====
- Senior Sergeant Sally Elizabeth Cottrell
- Commander Joanne Louise Stolp

==== Northern Territory Police ====
- Senior Constable First Class Bindi-Jane Burnell
- Detective Senior Constable Christopher Dean Kilian

=== Australian Fire Service Medal (AFSM) ===
Australian Fire Service Medal ribbon

==== New South Wales ====
- Darren George Breust
- Norman John Buckley
- Guy Roland Duckworth
- John Gregory Dun
- Jeremy Marcus Fewtrell
- Glen Vincent Howe
- Thomas John Marshall
- Kenneth Arthur Pullen
- Dennis Andrew Stannard
- Alice Joyce Strutt

==== Victoria ====
- Brendan John Angwin
- Craig Brownlie
- Ross Coyle
- Jonathan Mark Gwilt
- Ian Maxwell Hay
- Gregory Douglas Leece
- Kevin David Legge
- Mark Lindsay Roberts
- Leighton Wraith

==== Queensland ====
- Corey Michael Bock

==== South Australia ====
- Brian Moon
- Kevin William Stewart
- Lee Douglas Watson
- Andrew Wood

==== Western Australia ====
- Robert Leonard Littmann
- William Lachlan McCaw
- John Constantine Varnavides
- Craig Kenneth Waters

==== Tasmania ====
- Shane Ian Batt
- Robert Bruce Dawes
- David Thomas Oakley

==== Australian Capital Territory ====
- Gary Robert Hooker
- Noel Walter McLaren

=== Ambulance Service Medal (ASM) ===
Ambulance Service Medal ribbon

==== New South Wales ====
- Peter John Rowlands
- Paula Louise Sinclair

==== Victoria ====
- Joanna Rae Algie
- Gregory Lewis Fithall
- Graham Mummery
- Kathleen Poulton
- Michael Colin Ray
- Jemima Tawse
- Shaun Whitmore

==== Queensland ====
- Julie Maree Calvert
- Gary William Cotterill
- Gene Morgan Curtis

==== Western Australia ====
- Stacey Maree Abbott
- Stephen Rodney Beaton
- Anne Louise Parsons

==== South Australia ====
- Jennifer Annette (Annie) Clements
- David William Place

==== Tasmania ====
- Matthew James Eastham
- Pamela Anne Heiermann

==== Northern Territory ====
- Rhys Lachlan Dowell

=== Emergency Services Medal (ESM) ===
Emergency Services Medal ribbon

==== New South Wales ====
- Matthew John Chifley
- Glenn Charles Hinton

==== Victoria ====
- Gary John Doorbar
- Lisa Nicole Wise

==== Queensland ====
- Cheryl-Lee Fitzgerald

==== Western Australia ====
- Michael James Ellis
- Allen John Gale

==== South Australia ====
- Richard Gordon Davison
- Antonie (Tom) Poel

==== Tasmania ====
- Cheryl Louise Ames
- Jason Alex Lawrence
- Jason Kenneth Robins

=== Australian Corrections Medal (ACM) ===
Australian Corrections Medal ribbon

==== New South Wales ====
- Shaun Harry Danby
- David John Harrower
- Vesna Mijatovic
- Kieren Shea

==== Victoria ====
- Robert McAdie
- Suzanne Maree Skrabl
- Melissa Sueanne Westin

==== Queensland ====
- Roberta Leigh Embrey
- Steven Mitchell
- Chel Shossana Sealey

==== Western Australia ====
- Susan Marie Andrews
- Andrea Jane Bowen
- Maria McGinty-Duggan
- Andrea Jayne Rees-Carter

==== South Australia ====
- Alicia Murphy
- Kevin Whenan

==== Tasmania ====
- John Ross Pickering

=== Australian Intelligence Medal (AIM) ===
Australian Intelligence Medal ribbon

- Andrew C
- Ian C
- Clare D
- Harry Genn
- Warren Dominic Gray
- William Lee
- Robert S
- Anthony W

== Distinguished and Conspicuous Service ==
=== Distinguished Service Medal (DSM) ===
Distinguished Service Medal ribbon

==== Army ====
- Brigadier David John Kelly, CSC – For distinguished leadership in warlike operations as the Chief of Operations for the North Atlantic Treaty Organisation Operation RESOLUTE SUPPORT, Afghanistan from December 2018 to December 2019.

=== Commendation for Distinguished Service ===
Commendation for Distinguished Service ribbon

==== Army ====
- Colonel Andrew Nicholas Abbott, AM – For distinguished performance of duties in warlike operations as the Combined Joint Director of Operations and Chief of Staff for the Train, Advise, Assist Command – South, while deployed on Operation HIGHROAD, from January to December 2019.
- Corporal B – For distinguished performance of duties in warlike operations as an Advisor with Task Group 632 Rotation XI deployed on Operation OKRA in Iraq from May to December 2019.
- Colonel Michael Brodie Bassingthwaite, DSM – For distinguished performance of duties in warlike operations as the Commander Task Group Taji IX on Operation OKRA in Iraq from June to December 2019.
- Captain Daniel Cooper – For distinguished performance of duties in warlike operations as the Logistics and Aviation Fuels Advisor for Train, Advise, Assist Command – Air on Operation HIGHROAD from January to August 2019.
- Captain Owen Kenneth Gibbs – For distinguished performance of duties in warlike operations as the Task Group Afghanistan Insider Threat Analyst during Operation HIGHROAD from March to October 2019.
- Lieutenant Jessica Ann Lyons – For distinguished performance of duties in warlike operations as a Force Protection Platoon Commander on Operation HIGHROAD from March to September 2019.
- Brigadier Timothy Charles O'Brien – For distinguished performance of duties on warlike operations as the Commander Task Group Afghanistan on Operation HIGHROAD from March to November 2019.
- Lieutenant Colonel T – For distinguished performance of duties in warlike operations as the Commander Special Operations Task Group 632 while deployed on Operation OKRA from June to December 2019.
- Sergeant W – For distinguished performance of duties in warlike operations as the Task Group 632 Signals Troop Sergeant deployed on Operation OKRA from May to December 2019.

=== Bar to the Conspicuous Service Cross (CSC and Bar) ===
Conspicuous Service Cross and Bar ribbon

==== Army ====
- Colonel Damien John McLachlan, CSC – For outstanding devotion to duty as the Director Technical Regulation and Evaluation – Army in Logistics Branch, Army Headquarters.

=== Conspicuous Service Cross (CSC) ===
Conspicuous Service Cross ribbon

==== Navy ====
- Lieutenant Commander Khan Richard Beaumont, RAN – For outstanding achievement as Commanding Officer of HMAS Ararat on Operations RESOLUTE and AUGURY from June 2018 to August 2020.
- Commander Robin Christopher Dainty, RAN – For outstanding achievement and leadership as Commanding Officer HMAS Collins.
- Chief Petty Officer Adam Fraser Gillon-Smith – For outstanding achievement in assuring the cryptographic readiness of the Australian Defence Force's Identification Friend or Foe capability.
- Captain Scott Anthony Houlihan, CSM, RAN – For outstanding devotion to duty as Commanding Officer of HMAS Choules.
- Commodore Bradley Robert Smith, RAN – For outstanding achievement in the field of materiel support for the Canberra Class Landing Helicopter Dock amphibious capability.
- Captain Eric Stephen Young, RAN – For outstanding devotion to duty as Chief of Staff to Chief of Navy.

==== Army ====
- Lieutenant Colonel Carl Nigel Baylis – For outstanding achievement enhancing the Australian Army's people capability systems.
- Brigadier Damian Michael Cantwell, AM – For outstanding achievement as the Commander of Joint Task Force 1111, Operation BUSHFIRE ASSIST 2019–2020.
- Lieutenant Colonel Sharon Maree Coates – For outstanding achievement as the Joint Task Group 646.2 Commanding Officer on Operation BUSHFIRE ASSIST 2019–2020.
- Lieutenant Colonel Luke Thomas Dawson – For outstanding achievement as the Operations Officer at Headquarters 1st Division and Deployable Joint Force Headquarters.
- Lieutenant Colonel Jane Larissa McBaron – For outstanding achievement in signals intelligence development for the Australian Defence Force as the inaugural Commanding Officer of the Joint Signals Intelligence Unit.
- Lieutenant Colonel Michael Robert Mudie – For outstanding devotion to duty as the Commanding Officer 7th Signal Regiment, Staff Officer Grade One Cyber and Career Adviser Signals Corps.
- Lieutenant Colonel Patrick Vincent O'Neill – For outstanding devotion to duty as Commander Australian Contingent and Chief of Operations, Operation MAZURKA, Multi-National Force and Observer Mission, Sinai, Egypt.
- Colonel Michael Douglas Scott – For outstanding achievement as Director of Current Military Commitments at Military Strategic Commitments Division.
- Lieutenant Colonel Paul Frederick Wright – For outstanding devotion to duty as the Staff Officer Grade One Infrastructure in the Directorate of Enabling Support, Army Headquarters.

==== Air Force ====
- Flight Lieutenant Daniel Beurich – For outstanding devotion to duty in aircrew training and tactics development on the AP-3C Electronic Warfare aircraft for the Australian Defence Force.
- Wing Commander Mark David Broadbridge – For outstanding achievement in establishing the Aviation Candidate Management Centre, and in the remediation of aviation workforce supply for the Australian Defence Force.
- Group Captain Michael John Burgess-Orton – For outstanding achievement in development and delivery of joint command and control networks and information technologies for the Australian Defence Force.
- Warrant Officer Jeffery Charles Graham – For outstanding devotion to duty in explosive ordnance disposal training and development for the Australian Defence Force.
- Squadron Leader Debbie Herberz – For outstanding achievement in education and training for the Royal Australian Air Force.
- Group Captain Paul Jeffrey Klose – For outstanding achievement in implementation of the Defence Aviation Safety Regulations, in introducing the Air Force Safety Always Program, and improving fleet management of aviation land materiel for the Australian Defence Force.
- Wing Commander Daniel Richard McManus – For outstanding achievement in the development of communications and land-based network information capabilities and specialist personnel for the Royal Australian Air Force.
- Squadron Leader Amanda Ailsa Norris – For outstanding achievement in F-35A Lightning II fighter aircraft training for the Australian Defence Force.
- Group Captain Peter Raymond Pollock – For outstanding achievement in project and program governance reform, and change management development and implementation in Capability Acquisition and Sustainment Group.
- Group Captain Benjamin William Poxon – For outstanding achievement in air mobility development and operations for the Australian Defence Force as Commanding Officer of Number 35 Squadron for the Royal Australian Air Force.
- Squadron Leader Matthew Allan Taylor – For outstanding devotion to duty in fighter aircraft maintenance as the Senior Engineering Officer of Number 2 Operational Conversion Unit, Royal Australian Air Force.
- Wing Commander Stephen Arthur Tubby – For outstanding achievement in education and training development for the Australian Defence Force.
- Wing Commander Naomi van der Linden – For outstanding achievement in ethics and leadership development and delivery for the Australian Defence Force as Acting Director of the Centre for Defence Leadership and Ethics.

=== Conspicuous Service Medal (CSM) ===
Conspicuous Service Medal ribbon

==== Navy ====
- Lieutenant Commander Luke William Bogan, RAN – For meritorious devotion to duty as the commissioning Marine Engineering Officer of HMAS Brisbane.
- Chief Petty Officer Rebecka Jasmine Clark – For meritorious achievement in the provision of exemplary medical support on Operation RESOLUTE from January 2018 to February 2020.
- Lieutenant Commander Nicole Anne Grundy, RAN – For meritorious devotion to duty as the Course Implementation Officer Royal Australian Navy Recruit School.
- Lieutenant Commander Jo Harvey-Collings, RAN – For meritorious achievement as Staff Officer – Intelligence at Submarine Operations, Headquarters Joint Operations Command on Operation SAVILLE.
- Leading Seaman Simone Hayley Henare – For meritorious devotion to duty in the field of Maritime Logistics.
- Lieutenant Commander Daniel Edward Hodgkinson, RAN – For meritorious devotion to duty as the Head of Officer Initial Training HMAS Creswell and Executive Officer of the Royal Australian Naval College.
- Warrant Officer William Gilvary McConnell – For meritorious achievement in the field of Navy Aviation Maintenance.
- Commander Charles Geoffrey Marchant, RAN – For meritorious devotion to duty as the Weapons Electrical Engineer Officer in HMAS Arunta.
- Warrant Officer Justin Powell Moore – For meritorious devotion to duty as the Submarine Force Command Warrant Officer.
- Leading Seaman Steven Arthur Palu – For meritorious devotion to duty during the operation to recover the United States Marine Corp MV-22 Osprey aircraft and three missing Marines in August 2017.
- Commander Matthew Scott Richardson, RAN – For meritorious achievement to the Patrol Boat community as Chief of Staff, Patrol Boat Group Headquarters.
- Lieutenant Commander Scott James Rivett, RAN – For meritorious devotion to duty as Staff Officer Plans in the Maritime Geospatial Warfare Unit.
- Leading Seaman Christopher Joseph Sanders – For meritorious achievement as the manager of the Communications and Information Systems Department in ADV Cape Inscription Starboard deployed on Operation RESOLUTE from January 2018 to June 2020.
- Chief Petty Officer Amy Louise Searle – For meritorious devotion to duty as the Operations Chief Petty Officer in Defence Communications Station Perth.

==== Army ====
- Major Leigh Joseph Brown – For meritorious achievement as Staff Officer Grade 2 – Infantry at the Combined Arms Training Centre.
- Captain Joseph William Cleary – For meritorious devotion to duty as Future Training Materials Warrant Officer at the Defence Force School of Intelligence.
- Warrant Officer Class Two G – For meritorious devotion to duty in the field of special operations capability development and Special Forces Instruction while posted to the 2nd Commando Regiment and Defence Special Operations Training and Education Centre.
- Captain Jonathan Robert Glover – For meritorious achievement in the performance of duty as a Project Engineer at the 19th Chief Engineer Works.
- Major Eli Simon Holliss – For meritorious achievement as the lead Staff Officer for electronic countermeasure development and engagements within the Australian Defence Force Headquarters.
- Warrant Officer Class Two Lance Robert Keighran – For meritorious achievement as a Training Design Warrant Officer at the Army Logistic Training Centre and contributions to Project Land 121 Overlander training.
- Lieutenant Colonel Renée Louise Kidson – For meritorious devotion to duty deployed as the Commanding Officer of the 5th Engineer Regiment Task Group on Operation BUSHFIRE ASSIST 2019–2020.
- Sergeant Rodney Paul Knox – For meritorious achievement as an intelligence analyst supporting the design of a future training and exercise environment for the Army.
- Lieutenant Colonel Sara Jayne Molloy – For meritorious achievement in the development and operation of Human Performance Development as the 3 Brigade Senior Health Officer.
- Major Brenton John Pearce – For meritorious achievement as the Executive Officer of the 1st Battalion, the Royal Australian Regiment; and as Headquarters 3rd Brigade Personnel Officer.
- Warrant Officer Class Two Christopher William Rohweder – For meritorious achievement in training and development support of the Australian Defence Force Explosive Ordnance Disposal Remediation Program at the Defence Explosive Ordnance Training School.
- Lieutenant Colonel Henry William Stimson, CSC – For meritorious devotion to duty as the Commanding Officer of the 2nd Combat Engineer Regiment Task Group whilst deployed on Operation BUSHFIRE ASSIST 2019–2020.
- Chaplain Jui-Hsiang Su – For meritorious achievement in leadership, pastoral support and welfare management within the Australian Army.

==== Air Force ====
- Group Captain Davin James Augustine – For meritorious achievement as the Chief of Staff Headquarters Joint Task Force 633 while deployed on Operation ACCORDION from December 2018 to October 2019.
- Warrant Officer Locksley Keith Burns – For meritorious devotion to duty in the sustainment and development of air traffic control, air navigation and surveillance systems for the Australian Defence Force.
- Corporal Leigh Michael Okunev – For meritorious devotion to duty in the technical support of the Defence Air Traffic Radar System at Williamtown as a Communications Electronics Technician.
- Squadron Leader Peter Anthony Perrin – For meritorious achievement in the design and creation of a Cyberspace Warfare workforce for the Royal Australian Air Force.

== Declined awards ==
- Kerry O'Brien, an Australian journalist, was reported to have declined his appointment as Officer of the Order of Australia in protest at Margaret Court's appointment as Companion of the Order of Australia.
