= Ida Hjort Kraby =

Norwegian jurist

Ida Hjort Kraby (born 2 September 1960) is a Norwegian jurist.

The daughter of Pål Kraby, Ida Hjort Kraby graduated from the University of Oslo as cand.jur. in 1988. She had worked as a research assistant there from 1986 to 1987 and was hired as a consultant in the Ministry of Justice and the Police in 1988. From 1990 to 1993 she was a deputy judge in Lofoten, and from 1993 to 2008 she was a lawyer at the Office of the Attorney General.

In 2008 she was appointed Ombudsman for Children in Norway, succeeding Reidar Hjermann. Later, it was revealed that Kraby had friendly relations with Minister of Children and Equality, Manuela Ramin-Osmundsen. Ramin-Osmundsen withdrew from her position, as did Kraby who never got the time to formally enter the post. The ombudsman post was again open, and Hjermann was this time found worthy of a second term.

Kraby is the daughter of the late Pål Fredrik Kraby, who was a prominent Norwegian businessperson and lawyer.
