= Emily Banks =

Emily Banks may refer to:

- Emily Banks (epidemiologist) (born 1968, Australian epidemiologist and public health physician
- Emily Banks (actress) (1938–2023), American actress and model
