= Baldry =

Baldry is a surname. Notable people with the name include:

- Alfred Lys Baldry (1858–1939), English art critic and painter
- Anna Costanza Baldry (1970 –2019), Italian criminologist
- Cherith Baldry (b. 1947), writer of fantasy fiction
- Dennis Baldry (b. 1931), English cricketer
- Eileen Baldry, Australian criminologist
- Long John Baldry (1941–2005), singer and actor
- Simon Baldry (b. 1976), English footballer
- Sir Tony Baldry (b. 1951), MP
- Thomas Baldry (1481–1524), MP
- Jack Baldry (d. c.1980), soft drinks manufacturer in Cambridge and Diss, Norfolk
