= Colleen Nelson =

Australian biochemist

Colleen Nelson AM is an Australian scientist specialising in prostate cancer research. She founded and directs the Australian Prostate Cancer Research Centre – Queensland (APCRC-Q). The Centre, based at the Translational Research Institute and the Princess Alexandra Hospital, spans the spectrum of discovery of new therapeutic targets and their preclinical and clinical development. She is also Chair of Prostate Cancer Research at Queensland University of Technology (QUT).

== Education ==
Nelson has a Bachelor of Science in Biochemistry from the University of Wyoming obtained in 1985. She completed a Ph.D, in Cell Biology from the Australian National University's John Curtin School of Medical Research in 1990.

== Biography ==
Nelson established the Australian Prostate Cancer Research Centre – Queensland in 2007, and was a co-founder of the Vancouver Prostate Centre in 1998. She founded and is the director of the Federal Government funded Australian-Canadian Prostate Cancer Research Alliance, a global network of researchers, clinicians, academics, and scientists who work in prostate cancer research.

In 2010, Nelson was appointed to the Movember Foundation's Board of Directors and serves as the Chair of Movember's Global Scientific Committee. This committee leads Movember's Global Action Plan to progress outcomes in prostate cancer research by facilitating global research collaboration projects.

In 1999, she established The Microarray Facility at The Prostate Centre for high throughput gene expression, second of its kind in Canada and the only large scale microarray facility in Western Canada.

Intellectual property from Nelson's research has been licensed from University of British Columbia to OncoGenex Pharmaceuticals, a Vancouver-based biotechnology company. The lead agents are now in Phase II and Phase III clinical trials in North America.

Nelson was appointed a Member of the Order of Australia in the 2021 Australia Day Honours for "significant service to medical research, particularly to prostate cancer, and to health organisations".

== Research ==
Nelson's expertise is in translational prostate cancer research, specifically in identification of potential therapeutic targets, their in vitro and in vivo validation, clinical validation through molecular pathology approaches, and their translation into potential clinical application. She has developed expertise in high throughput applications in microarray gene expression, gene regulation, animal models, prostate cancer, steroid hormones, molecular endocrinology, and targeted therapeutics.

Throughout her career, she has studied androgen action and the effects of androgen deprivation and progression to castrate resistant prostate cancer. Her laboratory made the seminal discovery that castrate resistant prostate tumours can synthesize their own androgens de novo from cholesterol. Recently, these findings have been extended to investigate the inter-relationships of androgen synthesis, prostate cancer progression, and metabolic syndrome.

== Fellowships ==
- 2009–2014: Queensland Smart Futures Premier's Fellow
- 2002–2007: Senior Faculty Scholar, Michael Smith Foundation for Health Research
- 1997–2002: Canadian Institutes of Health Research Faculty Scholar
- 1997–2004: NCIC Senior Research Fellowship Award
- 1995–1997: Centennial Medical Research Council Fellow, Canada
- 1990–1995: Senior Research Fellowship, National Cancer Institute of Canada
