= Helen O'Connell (urologist) =

Australian urologist

Helen O'Connell AO
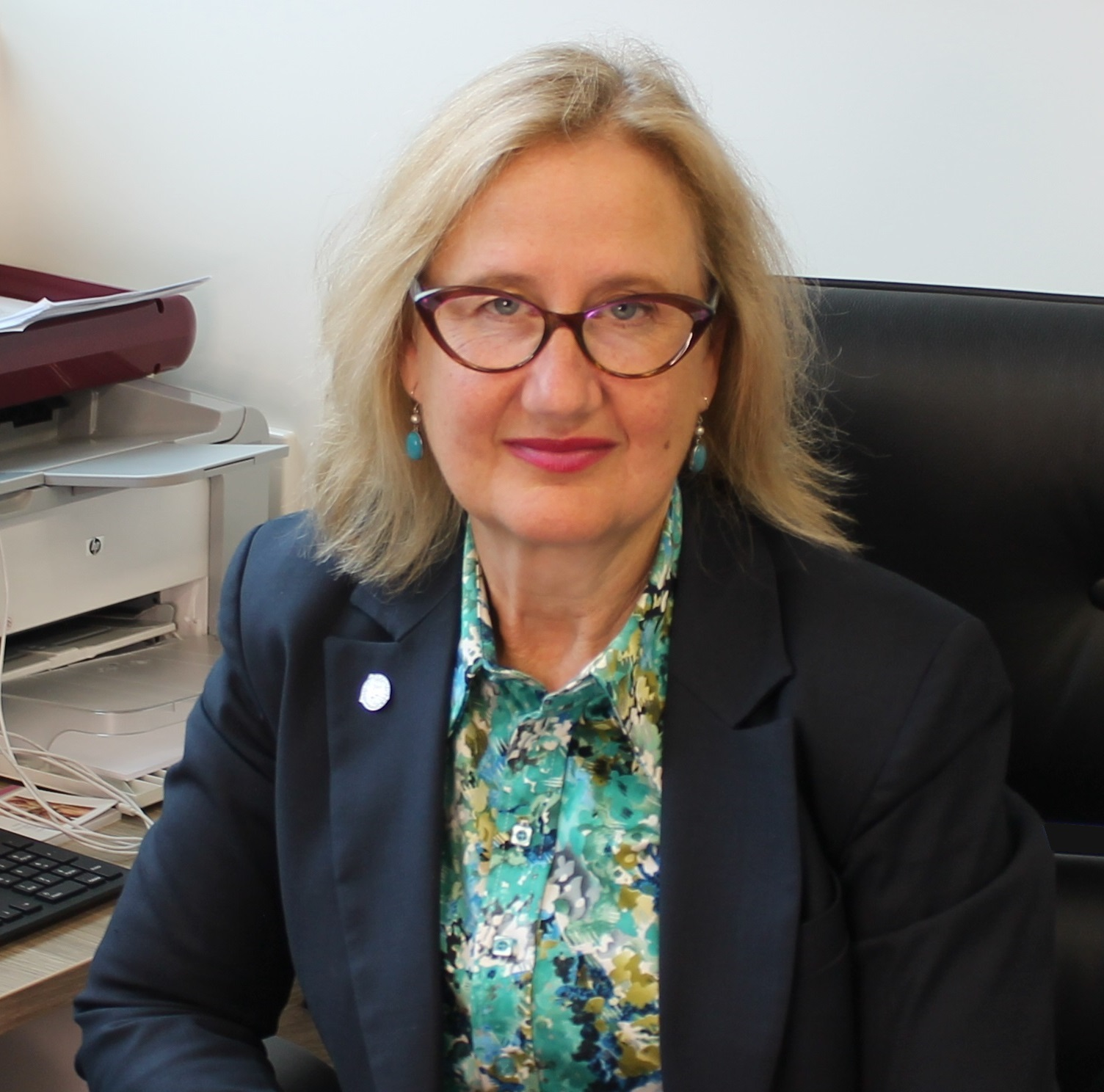
- Born: 3 April 1962 (age 64); Melbourne, Australia
- Education: University of Melbourne (Bachelor of Medicine, Bachelor of Surgery); University of Melbourne, Royal Melbourne Hospital, and Melbourne Private Hospital (Doctor of Medicine)
- Occupations: professor and urology department director
- Known for: first female urologist in Australia
- Medical career
- Field: urology
- Institutions: Western Health
- Sub-specialties: female pelvic anatomy
- Research: anatomy of the clitoris
- Website: https://oconnellurology.com.au/

Helen Elizabeth O'Connell AO (born 3 April 1962) is an Australian professor of urology and a pioneer in the anatomical study of the clitoris. She is a leading researcher in the area of female pelvic anatomy and was the first woman to complete training as a urologist in Australia.

== Education ==
O'Connell graduated from Melbourne University with a Bachelor of Medicine, Bachelor of Surgery degree. In 1994, she became a Fellow of the Royal Australian College of Surgeons as Australia's first female urological surgeon. From 1994 to 1995, she moved to the United States for advanced training (a fellowship), with neuro-urologist Edward J. McGuire in Houston, Texas. In 1997, she obtained a Master of Medicine degree for a project on female urinary incontinence. In 2004, she graduated from the University of Melbourne, Royal Melbourne Hospital, and Melbourne Private Hospital with a Doctor of Medicine in the field of female pelvic anatomy.

== Career ==
O'Connell became the first female urologist in Australia in 1993. O'Connell's aim was to improve knowledge of female pelvic anatomy, including the genitourinary tract with the reproductive organs, through insights from surgery. Her clinical and research focus is on the surgical treatment of lower urinary tract problems, particularly incontinence and bladder sphincter obstruction.

Since 2016, she has been director of the urology department of Western Health in the Australian state of Victoria.

=== Clitoris research ===
In 1998, O'Connell published research results on the widely ramified deeper structure of the clitoris, and in 2005, in the Journal of Urology, the article "Anatomy of the Clitoris". Multiplanar imaging of clitoral anatomy using magnetic resonance imaging in the living state supplemented the dissection material and showed that the erectile vestibular bulbs are a part of the clitoris, and that the female urethra and vagina, although not erectile in character, are closely related structures that form a tissue cluster with the clitoris that is the site of female sexual function and orgasm. Among others, the science magazine New Scientist reported on the results of the investigation. In 2010, O'Connell succeeded for the first time in depicting a stimulated clitoris in a three-dimensional image and showing its more than 15,000 nerve endings in the pelvic area.

O'Connell has conducted several research projects on the female genital system. This has resulted in five publications in the form of articles, including her dissertation Review of the Anatomy of Clitoris, defended in 2005.

In 2003, she was scientific advisor for the documentary film The Clitoris, the Great Unknown, in which she also gave an interview. In the context, O'Connell referred to an anatomical textbook she used while studying in the 1980s. She said this impression became the motivation for her to focus on this area because no description of the clitoris was in it, although it had a whole chapter on the mechanism of erection with information on the neuroanatomy and vascular nutrition of the penis, without ever mentioning the clitoris. Later as internship trainee in the surgery operating room, she noticed that special attention was paid to preserving sexual function during surgical procedures on men, while preserving sexual function during procedures on women seemed more incidental. She said no manual was available on the nerves and blood supply to the clitoris.

== Other roles ==
She was director of the Royal Australian College of Surgeons (RACS) between 2005 and 2014, and was elected director of the Urological Society of Australia and New Zealand from 2005 to 2010. She was chair of the RACS Surgical Research Board from 2007 to 2009.

In 2019, she was appointed director of the International Continence Society meeting to be held in Melbourne in 2021.

== Awards and honours ==
O'Connell was appointed an Officer of the Order of Australia in the 2021 Australia Day Honours for "distinguished service to medical education, and to medicine, in the field of urology, as an academic and clinician, and to professional groups".

== Publications ==
- Helen E. O'Connell, Edward J. McGuire, Sherif Aboseif, Akihiro Usui: Transurethral collagen therapy in women. In: The Journal of urology, 1995, page 1463-1465.
- Laurence M. Harewood, Laurence K. Cleeve, Helen E. O'Connell, Alavn J. Pope, Michael G. Vaughan, Dinesh Agarwal: Transurethral needle ablation of the prostate (TUNA): clinical results and ultrasound, endoscopic, and histologic findings in pilot study of patients in urinary retention. In: Journal of endourology, 1995, page 407-412.
- Edward J. McGuire, Helen E. O'Connell: Surgical treatment of intrinsic urethral dysfunction. Slings. In: The Urologic Clinics of North America, 1995, page 657-664.
- H. D. Flood, S. J. Malhotra, H. E. O'Connell, M. J. Ritchey, D. A. Bloom, E. J. McGuire: Long‐term results and complications using augmentation cystoplasty in reconstructive urology. In: Neurourology and urodynamics, 1995, page 297-309.
- E. J. McGuire, R. D. Cespedes, Helen E. O'Connell: Leak-point pressures. In: Urologic Clinics, 1996, page 253-262.
- S. R. Aboseif, H. E. O'Connell, A. Usui, E.J. McGuire: Collagen injection for intrinsic sphincteric deficiency in men. In: The Journal of urology, 1996, page 10-13.
- Edward J. McGuire, R. Duane Cespedes, Cindy A. Cross, Helen E. O'Connell: Videourodynamic studies. In: Urologic Clinics, 1996, page 309-321.
- Helen E. O'Connell, John M. Hutson, Colin R. Anderson, Robert J. Plenter: Anatomical relationship between urethra and clitoris. In: The Journal of urology, 1998, page 1892-1897.
- J. L. Morgan, Helen E. O'Connell, E. J. McGuire: Is intrinsic sphincter deficiency a complication of simple hysterectomy? In: The Journal of urology, 2000, page 767-769.
- Megan A. Rees, Helen E. O'Connell, Robert J. Plenter, John M. Hutson: The suspensory ligament of the clitoris: connective tissue supports of the erectile tissues of the female urogenital region. In: Clinical Anatomy: The Official Journal of the American Association of Clinical Anatomists and the British Association of Clinical Anatomists, 2000, page 397-403,
- M. Sherburn, J. R. Guthrie, E. C. Dudley, Helen E. O'Connell, L. Dennerstein: Is incontinence associated with menopause? In: Obstetrics & gynecologym, 2001, Seite 628-633.
- Helen O'Connell, K. V. Sanjeevan, J. M. Hutson: Anatomy of the clitoris. In: The Journal of urology, 2005, page 1189-1195.
- Helen O'Conell, John Ol DeLancey: Clitoral anatomy in nulliparous, healthy, premenopausal volunteers using unenhanced magnetic resonance imaging. In: The Journal of urology, 2005, page 2060-2063.
- Helen O'Connell, Kalavamparan V. Sanjeevan: Anatomy of female genitalia. In: Goldstein, I., Meston, C., Davis, S. R, and Traish, A. Women's Sexual Function and Dysfunction. Study, Diagnosis and Treatment. London: Taylor & Francis, 2006, page 105 ff.
- Helen O'Connell, Norm Eizenberg, Marzia Rahman, Joan Cleeve: The anatomy of the distal vagina: towards unity. In: The journal of sexual medicine, 2008, page 1883-1891.
- Damon P Eisen, Ian R Fraser, Linda M Sung, Moira Finlay, Scott Bowden, Helen O'Connell: Decreased viral load and symptoms of polyomavirus-associated chronic interstitial cystitis after intravesical cidofovir treatment. In: Clinical Infectious Diseases, 2009, page e86-e88.
- Vincent Tse, Jennifer King, Caroline Dowling, Sharon English, Katherine Gray, Richard Millard, Helen O'Connell, Samantha Pillay, Jeffrey Thavaseelan: Conjoint Urological Society of Australia and New Zealand (USANZ) and Urogynaecological Society of Australasia (UGSA) Guidelines on the management of adult non‐neurogenic overactive bladder. In: BJU international, 2016, page 34-47.
