= Trond Waage =

Trond Waage (born 14 February 1953) is a child rights expert at the UNICEF Innocenti Research Centre in Florence, Italy. Previously, he was for eight years Norway's Ombudsman for Children. In this role he initiated the European Network of Ombudspersons for Children (ENOC) and was involved in setting up ombuds offices for children in Europe and Africa. Norway was the first country to establish an Ombudsman for Children, in 1981.

His previous positions have included Senior Advisor for the Ministry of Children and Family Affairs in Norway; Director of Research at Childwatch International Research Network, a global nongovernmental network of institutions that collaborate in research on improving children's well-being; Senior Programme Officer at what is now the International Council for Open and Distance Education (ICDE), where he ran multi-channel learning projects in developing countries in co-operation with UN agencies, bilateral agencies and national authorities; and Director of the TV Department at the University of Oslo, Department of Special Education.

Trond Waage is a board member ofseveral organisations and he was also the first leader of the Norwegian Trade Council for Pharmacies, with the aim of monitoring the practice and quality of pharmacy services according to the Standards for Pharmacy Practice.

Preceded by Trond-Viggo Torgersen	Ombudsman for Children in Norway; 1996–2004	Succeeded by Reidar Hjermann
