= Snohomish County Children's Commission =

The Snohomish County Children’s Commission is a local Children's Ombudsman agency in the US state of Washington. It has 25 members, including two youth, appointed by Snohomish County Council to serve as advisers on issues of health, safety, and welfare of children. Commissioners are mandated to act in an advocacy role on behalf of the children of Snohomish County. Research and development work is conducted through forums, public hearings and a strong committee structure. Advocacy work is accomplished through publications, legislative efforts, active involvement in resolving local issues and monthly meetings held in public session. Members are appointed to a four-year term and represent a diversity of backgrounds, including health and human services, law and justice, education, business and labor, children and youth, parents, minorities and concerned citizens.

The Commission addresses concerns around access to adequate health care, children's participation in their community, education, safety and stability in home life, protection from abuse, commercial sexual exploitation of children, bullying, alcohol and other drugs, adequate nutrition, exercise, resourcing of public services, positive youth development, street gangs, mental health issues, juvenile crime and the best interests principle in decision making.

The Commission was created by County Ordinance number 85-060 in July 1985. It was the first Children’s Commission formed in Washington State. It first met on 8 January 1986. Shortly after its formation, the Commission came to national media attention when it was called upon to investigate the killing of an infant by his father.
