= Pål Kraby =

Norwegian businessperson and lawyer

- Born: 16 February 1932. In Lillehammer, Kraby
- Died: 8 August 2009
- Citizenship: Norwegian
- Occupation(s): businessperson and lawyer
- Notable work: The SKUP Prize

Pål Fredrik Kraby (16 February 1932 – 8 August 2009) was a Norwegian businessperson and lawyer.

Born in Lillehammer, Kraby became a Supreme Court barrister in 1968. He was the CEO of the Norwegian Employers' Confederation (NAF) from 1979 to 1987, having been assisting director since 1973. He was pressured to resign due to a lockout which failed. Having received a secret golden parachute, this was unveiled in 1992 by journalist Arne O. Holm. For this, Holm was awarded the SKUP Prize.

He was the father of Ida Hjort Kraby. He died in August 2009.

Business positions
Preceded by	CEO of the Confederation of Norwegian Enterprise; 1979–1987	Succeeded by Egil Myklebust
