= Bernadette Black =

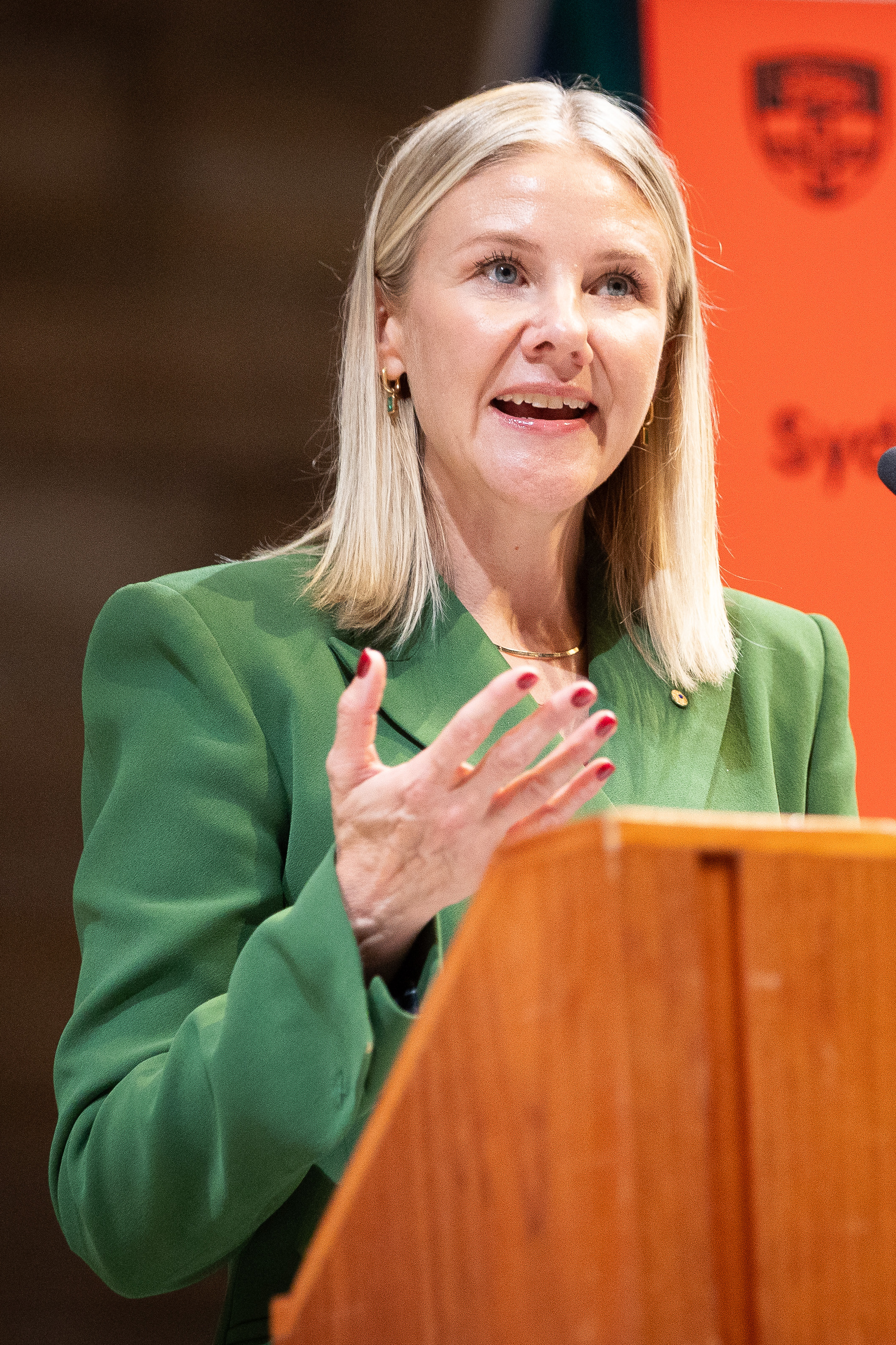
2026 Sydney Policy Lab Annual Lecture, Great Hall, Sydney University

Bernadette Black AM is an Australian author, social entrepreneur, and advocate. She founded the Brave Foundation in 2009 and SEED Futures in 2024, and has worked on social policy frameworks regarding primary prevention and support for young parents in Australia.

== Education and qualifications ==
Black holds a Bachelor of Nursing and a Graduate Diploma in Perioperative Nursing from La Trobe University. She holds an Executive Certificate in Public Leadership from Harvard Kennedy School, and is a graduate of the Australian Institute of Company Directors.

== Career ==
In 2006, Black published her memoir, Brave Little Bear, detailing her experience as a teenage mother.

In 2009, she founded the Brave Foundation, a non-profit organisation created to provide support, resources, and educational pathways for expectant and parenting teens, based from her own story as a young mother, which she spoke about on ABC radio and in other interviews. Under her leadership as CEO, the foundation expanded its programs nationwide and secured national funding to assist young families. In a 2022 LinkedIn article, Black reflected on the transition from leading Brave Foundation to her subsequent policy and systems-reform work.

In 2024, Black established SEED Futures, an initiative focused on primary prevention policy and systemic family support. She co-authored Establishing a National Primary Prevention Framework in collaboration with policy research bodies and designed the Incremental Reform Catalogue policy tool.

=== National and international advisory roles ===
Black serves on policy and advisory bodies related to social framework development:

- Advisory member with the Sydney Policy Lab at the University of Sydney
- Advisory member on the National Prevention Strategies Advisory Group with the NYU Center on International Cooperation
- Presenter at the 2026 Global Caregiver Forum in Madrid, co-hosted by UNICEF and the World Health Organization. Government of Spain
- Presenter at the 2026 Social Outcomes Conference, Blavatnik School of Government, Oxford University

== Honours and recognition ==
- 2024: Awarded a Winston Churchill Fellowship
- 2021: In the 2021 Australia Day Honours, Black was appointed a Member of the Order of Australia (AM) for significant service to youth, to local government and to the community.
- 2019: Tasmanian Australian of the Year
- 2016: Telstra Tasmanian Businesswoman of the Year
- 2009: Barnardos Australian Mother of the Year

== Selected publications ==
- Black published Brave Little Bear: The Inspirational Story of a Teenage Mother in 2006.
- In 2025, SEED Futures partnered with the University of Sydney's Sydney Policy Lab to develop the National Primary Preventive Framework, which focuses on systemic primary prevention for families during a child's first 1,000 days.
- In 2026, The Winston Churchill Trust published Black's Churchill fellowship report. "Prevention Nation: The Strategy"

== Personal life ==
Black lives in Tasmania with her husband, Steven, and is a mother of three and a grandmother of two.
