= Reidar Hjermann =

Norwegian psychologist (born 1969)

Reidar Kvaal Hjermann (born 17 February 1969) is a Norwegian psychologist and former Children's Ombudsman of Norway.

The son of Ingvar Hjermann, Reidar started working as a psychologist in 1998. In 2004 he was appointed Ombudsman for Children in Norway, succeeding fellow psychologist Trond Waage.

When his four-year term ended in 2008, he applied for a second term. However, the job was given to jurist Ida Hjort Kraby. Later, it was revealed that Kraby had friendly relations with Minister of Children and Equality, Manuela Ramin-Osmundsen. Ramin-Osmundsen withdrew from her position, as did Kraby, who never got the time to formally enter the post. With the ombudsman position open again, Hjermann was then appointed to a second term, where he served until the end of the term in 2012.

Preceded by Trond Waage	Ombudsman for Children in Norway; 2004–2012	Succeeded by Anne Lindboe
