= Translation convention =

The translation convention is a storytelling device in which the spoken language of a film or television program is changed for easier consumption and broader distribution. Commonly, that language is English, but the translation convention can be used for any media property produced in a major world language that its producers would like to distribute to foreign countries. The concept of translation convention also applies to written texts.

== Overview ==
In many stories, the setting dictates what language characters would speak. For example, if a story takes place in Mexico, the Mexicans would speak to American characters in Spanish, the native language in Mexico. When talking to each other, the Mexicans might speak English instead. Often, this would be because it is made by a production company based in an English-speaking country, like the United States or the United Kingdom. Sometimes, some or all of the characters speak with an accent that reflects the actual language spoken in the fictional or historical story setting.

The translation convention has a few variants, and the translation choices the filmmakers employ has implications for the broader story for point of view, and whether the audience has first person, omniscient or limited information about the characters' thoughts, feelings and intentions. (See list of narrative techniques.) This concept has been used since the beginning of narrative sound film. It uses, among other things, a degree of suspension of disbelief.

== Exceptions ==
A large proportion of films and television shows set outside the English-speaking world use the translation convention, especially those produced in the US and the UK. There are a few notable American-produced exceptions which have high-native-language fidelity or realism. Among them are: The Passion of the Christ (which uses Aramaic, reconstructed ancient Hebrew, and Latin), Apocalypto (which uses Yucatec Maya), and Inglorious Basterds (which uses French and German). Despite being produced for a global audience or English-speaking audience, the filmmakers have committed to use the correct language or languages for the story's setting.

== See also ==
- Dramatic convention
- Practice of dubbing foreign films
- Language localization
- Narration
