= Eileen Baldry =

Australian criminologist

Eileen Baldry AO FASSA FRSN
- Awards: NSW Justice Medal

Academic background
- Education: University of Sydney
- Alma mater: University of New South Wales
- Thesis: The development of the health consumer movement and its effect on value changes and health policy in Australia (1992)

Eileen Baldry is an Australian criminologist and social justice advocate. She is a Professor Emerita of Criminology at the University of New South Wales (UNSW), where she has been an academic since 1993, and was the inaugural Deputy Vice-Chancellor Equity Diversity and Inclusion from 2017-2022.

== Academic career ==
Baldry completed a BA, Dip Ed and Dip TEFL at the University of Sydney. She graduated from the UNSW in 1992 with a PhD on "The development of the health consumer movement and its effect on value changes and health policy in Australia".

Baldry has been employed by UNSW since 1987, initially in casual research and teaching roles. Following graduation with her PhD she became lecturer (1993–1999), senior lecturer (1999–2006), associate professor (2006–2010) and finally Professor of Criminology in 2011. She was appointed inaugural Deputy Vice-Chancellor Inclusion and Diversity at UNSW in July 2017, the first woman to fill a DVC position at the university.

Since 1995 Baldry has filled a number of NSW government and community positions, and as of January 2021 is Chair of the Coalition for Intellectual Disability in the Criminal Justice System (2005–), Chair of the NSW Homelessness Expert Advisory Committee and Monitoring and Evaluation Group Homelessness Reform (2012–), Deputy Chair of the Disability Council NSW (2015–), Director, Public Interest Advocacy Centre Ltd (2015–) and National Co-Chair Anti Poverty Week (2017–).

She was a member of the board of the Centre for Health Research in Criminal Justice with the NSW Department of Health (2005–2010), expert advisor to the Juvenile Justice Transitional Program in the NSW Department of Corrective Services (2009–2011) and president of NSW Council of Social Service (2010–2014).

== Honours and recognition ==
- 2009: NSW Justice Medal by the Law and Justice Foundation of NSW.
- 2016: named one of the Australian Financial Review/Westpac 100 most influential women in Australia
- 2017: Fellow of the Academy of the Social Sciences in Australia
- 2018: Fellow of the Royal Society of New South Wales
- 2021: appointed Officer of the Order of Australia in the 2021 Australia Day Honours, for "distinguished service to tertiary education, to criminology and social welfare policy, and as an advocate for diversity, equity and inclusion"

== Selected works ==
=== Books ===
- Baldry, Eileen; Hughes, Mark; Burnett, Linda; Collinson, Ian (2011), Studying for social work, Sage, ISBN 9781848601246
- Cunneen, Chris; Baldry, Eileen; Brown, David; Schwartz, Melanie; Steel, Alex; Brown, Mark (2013), Penal Culture and Hyperincarceration: The revival of the prison, Ashgate Publishing, ISBN 9781409447290
- Goldson, Barry; Cunneen, Chris; Russell, Sophie; Brown, David; Baldry, Eileen; Schwartz, Melanie; Briggs, Damon (30 October 2020), Youth justice and penality in comparative context (1st ed.), Routledge (published 2019), ISBN 978-0815374466

=== Articles ===
- Nadine Ezard; Michael E Cecilio; Brendan Clifford; Eileen Baldry; Lucinda Burns; Carolyn A Day; Marian Shanahan; Kate Dolan (17 April 2018). "A managed alcohol program in Sydney, Australia: Acceptability, cost-savings and non-beverage alcohol use". Drug and Alcohol Review. 37 Suppl 1: S184–S194. doi:10.1111/DAR.12702. ISSN 0959-5236. PMID 29665174. Wikidata Q52582880.
- Jocelyn Jones; Mandy Wilson; Elizabeth A. Sullivan; Lynn Atkinson; Marisa Gilles; Paul L Simpson; Eileen Baldry; Tony Butler (17 December 2018). "Australian Aboriginal women prisoners' experiences of being a mother: a review". International Journal of Prisoner Health. 14 (4): 221–231. doi:10.1108/IJPH-12-2017-0059. ISSN 1744-9200. PMID 30468109. Wikidata Q63358598.
- Sacha Kendall; Stacey Lighton; Juanita Sherwood; Eileen Baldry; Elizabeth Sullivan (13 May 2019). "Holistic Conceptualizations of Health by Incarcerated Aboriginal Women in New South Wales, Australia". Qualitative Health Research. 29 (11): 1549–1565. doi:10.1177/1049732319846162. ISSN 1049-7323. PMID 31079548. Wikidata Q91955409.
