= Emily Banks (epidemiologist) =

Epidemiologist and public health researcher

Professor Emily Banks AM FAHMS
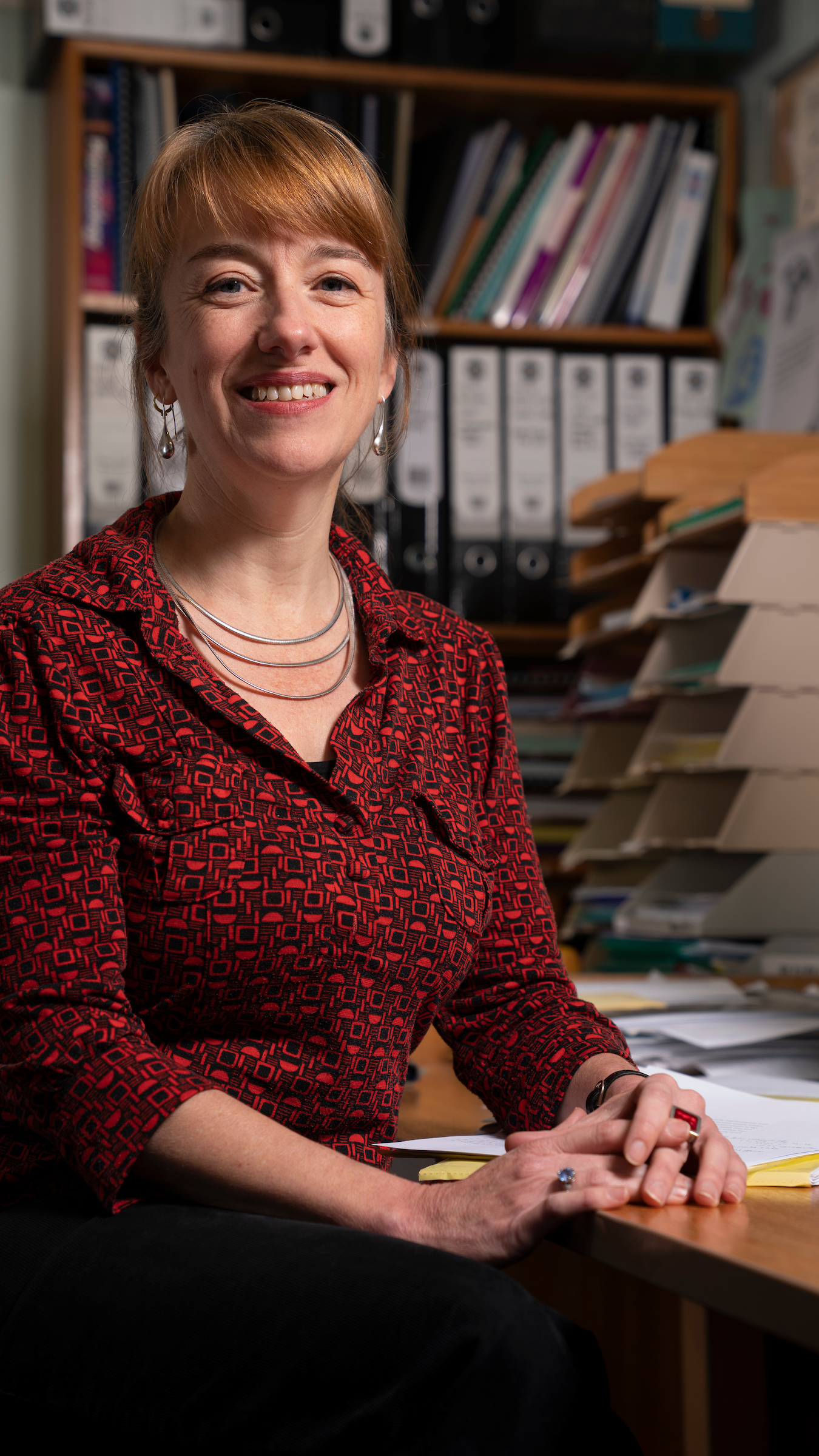
- Professor Emily Banks in 2019
- Born: 1 May 1968 (age 58); Cambridge, United Kingdom
- Citizenship: Australia, United Kingdom
- Education: Monash University (1993), London School of Hygiene and Tropical Medicine (PhD) (2000)
- Occupations: Epidemiologist; physician
- Awards: Fellow of the Australian Academy of Health and Medical Sciences (2017); Member of the Order of Australia 2021)
- Scientific career
- Fields: Epidemiology, population health
- Workplaces: Australian National University, Oxford University, The Sax Institute
- Doctoral advisor: Valerie Beral

Emily Banks is an Australian epidemiologist and public health physician, working mainly on chronic disease. She is a Professor of Epidemiology and Public Health and Head of the Centre for Public Health Data and Policy at the Australian National University, and a visiting professor at the University of Oxford.

Banks was appointed a Fellow of the Australian Academy of Health and Medical Sciences in 2017 and was made a member of the Order of Australia in 2021. She currently chairs the Health Research Impact Committee for the National Health and Medical Research Council of Australia (NHMRC) and is a member of NHMRC Council.

== Early life and education ==
Banks was born in Cambridge, United Kingdom and came to Canberra, Australia as a child. She attended Lyneham High School in Canberra and moved to Melbourne for her tertiary education. Banks was awarded a Bachelor of Medical Science with First Class Honours (1990) and a Bachelor of Medicine, Bachelor of Surgery with First Class Honours (1993) from Monash University, Melbourne. After her medical internship in Canberra, Banks moved to Oxford in 1995. She completed a PhD in epidemiology at the London School of Hygiene and Tropical Medicine in 2000, supervised by Dame Valerie Beral, while working as an epidemiologist in Oxford. Her PhD research was on menopausal hormone therapy (MHT) and breast cancer screening in the UK. Banks completed specialist training as a public health physician in 2004.

== Career ==
In 1995, Banks was appointed as an epidemiologist at the Cancer Epidemiology Unit, Imperial Cancer Research Fund, University of Oxford. She was a founding member of the team that created the Million Women Study, a large-scale prospective study of UK women born between 1935 and 1950. From 2001 to 2002 she was the scientific secretary to the Protocol Development Committee for UK Biobank, during which time she wrote the protocol for a cohort study of 500,000 men and women to study gene-environment interaction. She was deputy director of the Cancer Research UK Epidemiology Unit, University of Oxford from 2001 to 2003.

Beral and Banks' 2003 publication on MHT and breast cancer in the Million Women Study was the most frequently cited paper on breast cancer worldwide in 2003–2005 and led to immediate changes in MHT prescribing policy and practice. This is likely to have contributed to the observed concurrent reductions in breast cancer incidence in many countries. In Australia alone, an estimated 600–800 fewer women are now diagnosed with breast cancer annually, attributable to more judicious use of menopausal hormone therapy.

In 2003, Banks returned to Australia. She was a founding member of the team that created the 45 and Up Study, Australia's largest ongoing study of health and ageing, with over 250,000 NSW participants. She was scientific director of the 45 and Up Study from 2003 to 2018.

At the same time, Banks took up an appointment at the National Centre for Epidemiology and Population Health, being first a Senior Fellow (2003–2007) then Associate Professor (2008–2009). Banks was appointed a Professor of Epidemiology in 2010 and heads the Centre for Public Health Data and Policy at the Australian National University.

Banks' 2006 World Health Organization paper on female genital mutilation (FGM) and obstetric outcome yielded the first reliable findings on the subject and resulted in a landmark cover publication in the Lancet in June 2006. The paper was cited in the UN-WHO Interagency Statement on the Elimination of Female Genital Mutilation. Its findings are widely acknowledged as providing the key research evidence underpinning advocacy against female genital mutilation and influenced the UN Resolution on FGM. Banks' work in this area was acknowledged by the Australian Health Minister and shadow Health Minister in a speech to Federal Parliament on 6 February 2013.

Her 2015 paper on smoking and mortality, which showed that up to two-thirds of Australian smokers will die from their habit, resulted in extensive public, research and policy discourse on smoking-related harms. The new evidence was used extensively by policy agencies, to guide policy, tobacco control and disease prevention efforts, including use by: commonwealth and state/territory health departments in their tobacco control strategies; Department of Prime Minister and Cabinet, in the Aboriginal and Torres Strait Islander Health Performance Framework 2014 Report; and the Australian Institute for Health and Welfare report on tobacco indicators. The paper is now routinely used by governments, non-government organisations (NGOs), health professionals and tobacco control advocates as part of their day-to-day work, and in education of health professionals. The research has been used to support legislative change, including being cited in the Explanatory Memorandum to the Excise Tariff Amendment (Tobacco) Bill 2016 and the Customs Tariff Amendment (Tobacco) Bill 2016. The research was used for advocacy and to guide cancer and cardiovascular disease prevention efforts for NGOs such as the Cancer Council and Heart Foundation and has been described by the Cancer Council Australia as "one of the most impactful studies published in Australia in relation to our work in health messaging, public policy and community engagement ... (It) is the highest impact paper in tobacco control in Australia for at least the last decade."

More recently, Banks has been leading the public health assessment of the effects of electronic cigarettes for the Australian Department of Health, which has also provided evidence underpinning the forthcoming NHMRC CEO'S statement and clinical guidance on the use of e-cigarettes for smoking cessation from the RACGP.

She currently chairs the NHMRC Health Research Impact Committee and is a member of the NHMRC Council.

== Awards and recognition ==
Banks was awarded the UK Woman of Achievement in Science and Technology (2000); ANU Vice-Chancellor's awards for Career Achievement (2010), Media Engagement (2011), Research Translation (2011), Public Policy and Outreach (2016) and Excellence in Supervision (2017); National Breast Cancer Foundation Patron's Award for services to breast cancer research (2014); Medical Journal of Australia/MDA National Prize for Excellence in Medical Research (2015); AFR/Westpac 100 Women of Influence (2016); ACT Heart Foundation Women with Heart (2017); Australian Government National Award for Outstanding Contribution to Student Learning (2017); Public Health Research and Practice's Paper of the Year for "Deadly progress: changes in Australian Aboriginal and Torres Strait Islander adult daily smoking from 2004–2015" (awarded in 2018); President's Award, Thoracic Society of Australia and New Zealand for outstanding contributions to research on smoking (2020); and the NHMRC Outstanding Contribution Award (2025).

Banks was appointed a Fellow of the Australasian Faculty of Public Health Medicine, Royal Australian College of Physicians in 2004 and a Fellow of the Australian Academy of Health and Medical Sciences in 2017.

Her expertise and contribution to population health was recognised by the World Economic Forum which invited her to address the Forum in Davos, Switzerland in 2017.

Banks was appointed a member of the Order of Australia in 2021, recognising her "significance service to medical research and education". The Australian Medical Association awarded her the AMA Gold Medal in 2022.
