= Manitoba Advocate for Children and Youth =

Independent, non-partisan office of the Manitoba Legislative Assembly

Office overview
- Formed: 1993
- Jurisdiction: Legislative Assembly of Manitoba
- Headquarters: 346 Portage Ave, Winnipeg, MB R3C 0C3
- Office executive: Sherry Gott, Manitoba Advocate; Kelly Gossfeld, Indigenous Deputy Manitoba Advocate
- Key document: The Advocate for Children and Youth Act
- Website: manitobaadvocate.ca/

The Manitoba Advocate for Children and Youth (MACY) is an independent, non-partisan office of the Manitoba Legislative Assembly. The office represents the rights, interests, and viewpoints of children, youth, and young adults throughout Manitoba who are receiving, or should be receiving, provincial public services. MACY does this by providing direct advocacy support to young people and their families, by reviewing public service delivery after the death or serious injury of a child, and by conducting child-centred research and systemic advocacy.

The Manitoba Advocate is empowered by legislation to make recommendations to improve the effectiveness and responsiveness of services provided to children, youth, and young adults. MACY is mandated through The Advocate for Children and Youth Act (ACYA), guided by the United Nations Convention on the Rights of the Child (UNCRC), and acts according to the best interests of children and youth.

== Office and Program Areas ==
The Manitoba Advocate has two offices in Winnipeg and one in Thompson, and eight program areas: Advocacy Services, Investigations and Child Death Reviews, Serious Injury Reviews and Investigations, Youth Engagement, Public Education, Research, Quality Assurance, and Finance and Administration. All program areas work collaboratively to respond to individual and systemic issues that challenge the rights of children, youth, and young adults in Manitoba. This includes the work and insights of the office’s Youth Ambassador Advisory Squad (YAAS), Elders Council, and Knowledge Keeper.

== History and Profile ==
In the 1980s the Manitoba government established a review committee on Indigenous and Métis adoptions and placements in the wake of allegations from First Nations and Métis communities that children were being fostered and placed in out-of-province homes for the purposes of adoption in large numbers. Judge Edwin C. Kimelman chaired the committee and found in 1984 that the province of Manitoba had the resources to meet the needs of all the children placed out of province. In 1985, he released a landmark report titled No Quiet Place, known in child welfare circles as the Kimelman Report. This report called for a child representative office to be opened to offer children in foster care support and guidance.

The Office of the Children’s Advocate (MACY’s original name) opened in 1993, initially reporting to the minister responsible for child and family services (CFS), getting its mandate from The Child and Family Services Act. In 1999, the Advocate became an independent officer that reports to the Manitoba Legislative Assembly, instead of a government minister. At this time, however, the mandate of the office still remained embedded within The Child and Family Services Act, meaning only children and youth involved with CFS were eligible for support from the Children’s Advocate.

In 2008, the Child Death Investigations program was created. The responsibility to review and investigate child deaths was moved from the Office of the Chief Medical Examiner to the Office of the Children’s Advocate. In 2012, the office began public education initiatives, with a focus on promoting the work of the Children’s Advocate and increasing awareness of the services available to Manitoba families. Shortly after, in 2013, the Quality Assurance program was established, with the goal of ensuring quality services and continuous improvement in office programs.

The Final Report of the Phoenix Sinclair Inquiry was released in 2014, which recommended the development of standalone legislation for the Advocate and to extend the office’s mandate beyond the child welfare system to all children and youth in the province who are receiving, or are eligible to receive, any publicly funded service.

In 2017, the ACYA passed with unanimous support from all parties in the provincial legislature. This new legislation ensures independence of the office and provides the Advocate with expanded domains beyond child welfare. This marks the first time in Manitoba law that the United Nations Convention on the Rights of the Child (UNCRC) is mentioned. In 2018, the ACYA came into force which allows the Advocate to publish special reports, make formal recommendations to additional departments and organizations in our eight designated service areas, and to track compliance progress on these recommendations publicly. MACY’s eight designated service areas are: child welfare, adoption, disabilities, education, mental health, addictions, victim supports, and youth justice. When the ACYA came into force, the Children’s Advocate changed their name to the Manitoba Advocate for Children and Youth.

The ACYA was introduced in three phases, with Phase 1 being immediately enacted in 2018 to expand to cover public services beyond child welfare and adoptions. Phase 2 was enacted on June 1, 2021, which expanded MACY’s mandate to include the investigations of child deaths in Manitoba with children who had interactions with mental health, addictions, and youth justice systems in the year before their death. At this point in time, the third and final phase of the ACYA, had yet to be proclaimed.

In 2019, the Youth Engagement program, the Youth Ambassador Advisory Squad (YAAS), the Elders Council, and the Knowledge Keeper position were established.

2021 brought the expansion of reviewable services to include mental health, addictions, and youth justice, which allows the Advocate to review and investigate the deaths and serious injuries of children and youth that had contact with those systems within a year of their deaths.

July 1, 2023 marked the final phase of the ACYA coming into force. Phase 3 introduced the Serious Injury Reporting Regulation alongside section 21 of the ACYA, the regulation mandates the reporting of serious injuries of young people to the Manitoba Advocate office and in conjunction, the addition of the Serious Injury Reviews and Investigations program.

== Contact Information ==
=== Winnipeg Office ===
204-988-7440

8:30 a.m. to 4:30 p.m.

Monday through Friday

346 Portage Avenue, Unit 100

Winnipeg, MB R3C 0C3

=== Thompson Office ===
204-677-7270

9:00 a.m. to 5:00 p.m.

Monday through Friday

300 Mystery Lake Road

Thompson, MB R8N 0M2

(inside the City Centre Mall)

Toll-free

1-800-263-7146

== Social Media ==
Facebook: facebook.com/ManitobaAdvocate/

Twitter: twitter.com/MB_Advocate

Instagram: instagram.com/manitobaadvocate/

YouTube: youtube.com/@ManitobaAdvocate

LinkedIn: linkedin.com/company/mbadvocate/
