= Amanda Fosang =

Australian biomedical researcher

Amanda Fosang AM
- Born: Melbourne, Victoria, Australia
- Scientific career
- Fields: Arthritis, cartilage, skeletal development, metalloproteinases, aggrecan
- Workplaces: The University of Melbourne and Murdoch Children's Research Institute

Amanda Jane Fosang AM is a biomedical researcher who has pioneered arthritis research in Australia.

== Career ==
Fosang is a principal research fellow with the National Health and Medical Research Council (NHMRC) of Australia who has an established career researching arthritis and cartilage biology in health and disease. She is professor and group leader of arthritis research at the Murdoch Children's Research Institute (MCRI) and the University of Melbourne Department of Paediatrics. Fosang returned to Australia after completing her post-doctoral studies at the Kennedy Institute of Rheumatology in London, and was awarded an RD Wright Fellowship by the NHMRC in 1994. Since then she has received continuous competitive grant and fellowship funding from the NHMRC. She joined the University of Melbourne, Department of Medicine in 1990, and moved to the Department of Paediatrics in 1994. Fosang became a group leader of the MCRI at its inception in 2000.

== Research program ==
The goal of Fosang's research program is to understand the complex interactions between cartilage cells and their matrix, in both healthy cartilage and arthritic diseases. Her work focuses on the structure and function of the cartilage molecules, aggrecan and type II collagen, and the enzymes that destroy them in arthritic disease. She and her team have generated unique mice for evaluating cartilage damage in arthritic disease. Her work showing that ADAMTS-5 is the major aggrecanase in mouse cartilage was published in the high-profile international journal Nature in 2005.

More recently, Fosang's group has been studying the degradation products generated by these enzymes, and how these products might regulate cellular function. Some studies are done in explant and cell culture systems, or with highly purified enzymes and substrates in vitro. Other studies use unique, genetically modified mice that have been engineered to resist cartilage destruction. Studies with these mice can provide valuable insights into the mechanisms of joint remodelling in development and disease. Her studies on cartilage biology and arthritic diseases will identify new target molecules and/or activities, for the development of disease-modifying arthritis therapies.

== Professional service ==
Fosang joined the board of directors for the Osteoarthritis Research Society International (OARSI) in 2012 and was appointed Chair of the OARSI Asian Task Force in 2013. She is the first Australian appointed to the Journal of Biological Chemistry as an associate editor. An educator and mentor of upcoming scientists, Fosang coordinates the Bachelor of Science (BSc) and Bachelor of Biomedicine (BBMed) Honours Program for the University of Melbourne (Department of Paediatrics) and the MCRI. She has also supervised five PhD students and eleven BSc Honours students to course completion.

== Awards ==
- Member of the Order of Australia, 2021
- NHMRC Principal Research Fellow, 2006, 2010
- Basic Science Award, Osteoarthritis Research Society International, 2009
- Selwyn-Smith Medical Research Prize, University of Melbourne, 2007
- Barry Preston Award, Matrix Biology Society of Australia & New Zealand, 2007
- Discovery Award for Excellence in Research Achievement, MCRI, 2006
