= Megan Mitchell =

Public servant and children's advocate

Megan Mitchell AM
- Born: 1958 or 1959 (age 67–68); St Margaret's Hospital, Darlinghurst, Australia
- Education: BA (Sydney); DipEd (Sydney Teachers' College); MA (Psychology) (Sydney); MA (Social Policy) (York)
- Alma mater: University of Sydney

National Children's Commissioner, Australian Human Rights Commission
- In office 25 February 2013 – 24 March 2020

New South Wales Commissioner for Children and Young People
- In office 2010–2013

Megan Mitchell AM (born 1958 or 1959) is an Australian public servant and children's advocate who served as the first Australian National Children's Commissioner (within the Australian Human Rights Commission) from 25 February 2013 to 24 March 2020. She previously held the role of New South Wales Commissioner for Children and Young People between 2010 and 2013.

== Early life and education ==
Mitchell was born at St Margaret's Hospital, Sydney to a single mother, Florence Pianta, who had moved to Sydney from Queensland when she discovered she was pregnant, and had changed her name by deed poll to Toni Mitchell and told staff she was pregnant to avoid questions about her marital status. She was raised by her mother with the support of an extended network of friends. In 2012 Mitchell made contact with her brother for the first time. She has credited her upbringing to her view that children should be seen as well as heard.

Mitchell originally studied education at the University of Sydney and Sydney Teachers' College, before obtaining master's degrees in psychology and social policy in 1982 and 1989.

== Early career ==
After studying, Mitchell held a number of government and other roles, including executive director of the ACT Office for Children, Youth and Family Support, executive director for Out of Home Care in the New South Wales Department of Community Services, executive director of the Australian Council of Social Service and Director, Strategic Policy and Planning in the NSW Ageing and Disability Department. She was appointed NSW Commissioner for Children and Young People in 2010, a position which she held for the following three years.

== Appointment as National Children's Commissioner ==
On 25 February 2013, the Gillard government appointed Mitchell as the first National Children's Commissioner within the Australian Human Rights Commission, a role that had been flagged in the previous year to ensure that the voices of young people were heard by Government. Her appointment, for a five-year term, was designed to "focus solely on the needs of children and their rights and their interests and the laws and policies and services that affect them". She was reappointed for a second two-year term in 2018 and finished the role on 24 March 2020.

== Honours ==
Mitchell was appointed a Member of the Order of Australia in the 2021 Australia Day Honours.
