= Welfare in New Zealand =

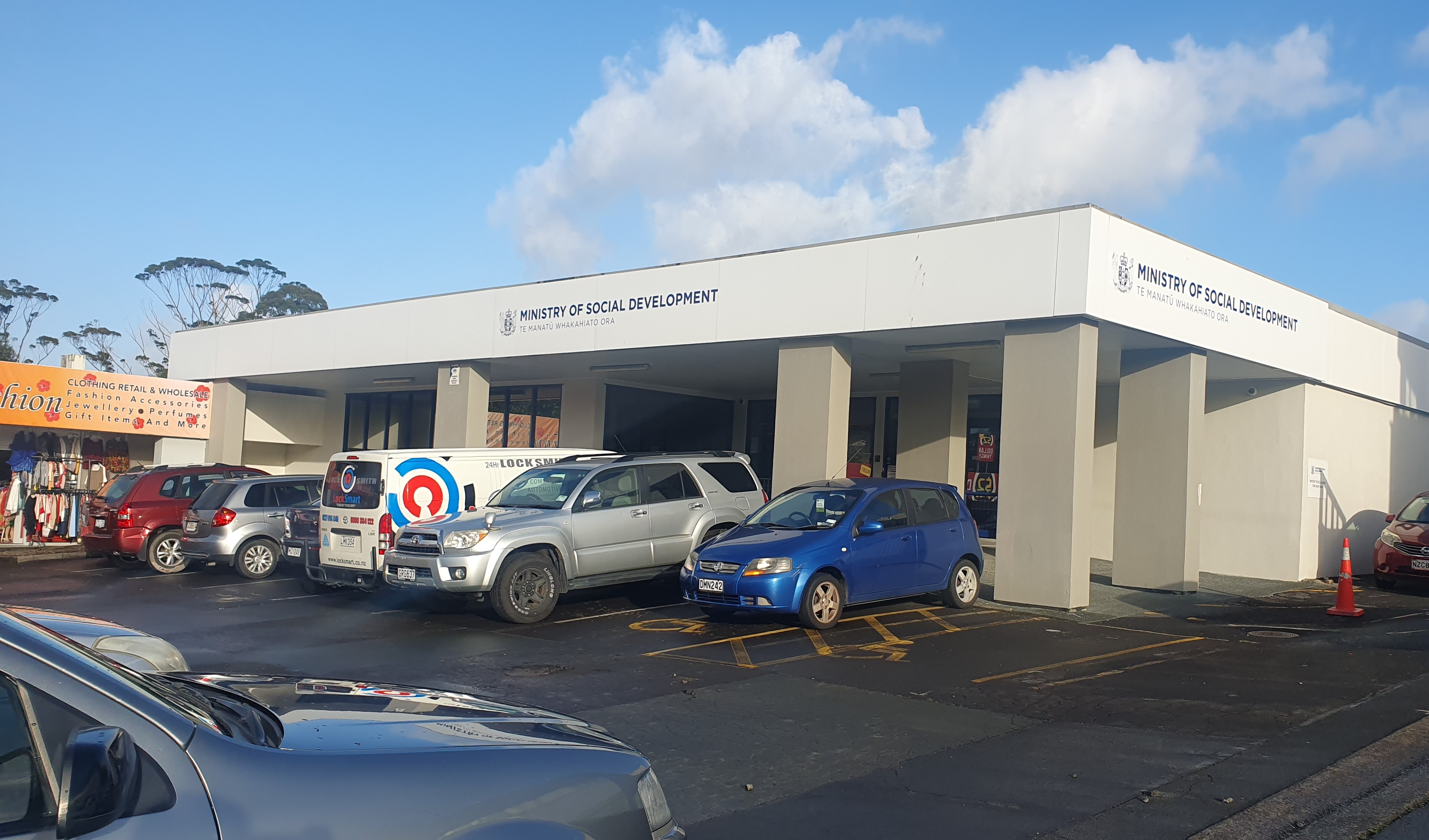
A Ministry of Social Development office in Glen Eden, West Auckland

Social welfare has long been an important part of New Zealand society and a significant political issue. It is concerned with the provision by the state of benefits and services. Together with fiscal welfare and occupational welfare, it makes up the social policy of New Zealand. Social welfare is mostly funded through general taxation. Since the 1980s welfare has been provided on the basis of need; the exception is universal superannuation where everyone is covered regardless of income, for example, retirement benefits.

== State housing ==
The government provides State housing to those in need. The number of houses owned by the State has varied over the years and between different governments. Currently the level of rent paid in state housing is related to the level of income of the people living in the house (income-related rents) so that those on low incomes pay below market rents. Where a household's income is relatively high the rents are set at the market rate.

In addition to the provision of State housing the government also provides an Accommodation Supplement. This is payable as a contribution to rent, board or mortgage payments for qualifying people. The Accommodation Supplement is not paid to those paying income-related rents in a State house.

In some instances a person may also qualify for a rates rebate to help with the cost of local government rates.

== Students ==
Domestic students (NZ citizens and PR, and Australian citizens studying in NZ) could avail these benefits.

- StudyLink is the primary financial aid hub for student loans (tuition, living costs), allowances (if eligible), and grants.
- Students Work & Income (WINZ): For severe hardship (not study-related), you might get benefits like Jobseeker Support (if you can't work) or Sole Parent Support, but these have strict conditions.

== Social security ==
Social security benefits are administered by Work and Income. As of July 2013, they include:

- Child Disability Allowance – for people providing full-time care for a child or young person (under 18) with a disability
- Jobseeker Support – for unemployed people aged 18 and over looking for employment. Formerly Unemployment Benefit.
- New Zealand Superannuation – for people aged 65 and above.
- Orphan's Benefit – for people who are raising children who can't live with their parents because they are deceased, incapacitated or can't be located.
- Sole Parent Support – for single parents aged 20 and over, who are caring for children aged under 14. Formerly Domestic Purposes Benefit - Sole Parent.
- Supported Living Payment – for people who cannot work due to disability, and people providing full-time care for someone 18 and over with a disability. Formerly Invalid's Benefit and Domestic Purposes Benefit - Care of the ill or infirm.
- Unsupported Child's Benefit – for people who are raising children who can't live with their parents due to a family breakdown.
- Veteran's Pension – for people who have served in the New Zealand Defence Force during a war or emergency and have a war-related disability.
- Young Parent Payment – for young people aged 16–19 and caring for children aged under 14, who can't live with their parents and are unsupported by them.
- Youth Payment – for young people aged 16–17 who can't live with their parents and are unsupported by them.

=== Unemployment Benefit (Jobseeker Support) ===
==== Unemployment Act 1930 ====
In 1930, while Prime Minister George Forbes was in London for the 1930 Imperial Conference, the United Government passed the Unemployment Act, promising relief payments to those who registered as unemployed. Upon his return to New Zealand in January 1931, Forbes announced there would be no payments made without work, meaning those registered would have to participate in government 'make work' schemes such as building roads and working on farms or in forestry projects. When the register was opened in February, 23,000 people put their names down; by June the number of registered unemployed had risen to 51,000 as the Great Depression worsened. The register did not include women, Māori, or boys under 16. In 1933 (by which time the number of unemployed had reached 80,000), MP Gordon Coates introduced the Small Farms (Relief of Unemployment) Bill to help turn unemployed workers into small farmers.

==== Social Security Act 1938 ====
After winning the 1935 election the newly elected Labour government immediately issued a Christmas bonus to the unemployed. However, a regular unemployment benefit was not introduced until the passing of the Social Security Act in 1938; that benefit was "payable to a person 16 years of age and over who has been in New Zealand for at least 12 months and is unemployed, is capable of and willing to undertake suitable work, and has taken reasonable steps to secure employment".

==== Today ====
The criteria for receiving an unemployment benefit remain similar to the original 1938 legislation. At 1 December 2011, a person could get Unemployment Benefit if they were:

- not in full-time work
- available for, and looking for full-time work
- over 18 years of age (or 16–17 if they are married or in a civil union or in a de facto relationship and have one or more children they support)
- be a New Zealand citizen or permanent resident
- have lived in New Zealand for at least 2 years at any one time since becoming a New Zealand citizen or resident (unless you are a refugee)
- normally living in New Zealand and intending to stay there.

They might still qualify if they were a full-time trainee on an approved work related course (usually less than 12 weeks) and looking for work.

The Unemployment Benefit gross rate at 1 April 2011 ranged between $150.01 and $375.04 a week depending on the applicant's age and living situation.

From September 2007 there has been a number of changes to the delivery of unemployment benefits; the changes focus mainly on youth with a goal of having all 15-to-19-year-olds engaged in employment, training, or education. People applying for the unemployment benefit will be required to undertake work- or training-related activities in the period between their first contact with Work and Income and their benefit commencing. They will also be required to look for and accept any offer of suitable work during that time. Similar new measures will also apply to people on Sickness Benefit and Invalid's Benefit, and the Domestic Purposes Benefit. Beneficiaries could have their benefits cut by up to 50% if they fail to comply. These new measures have been criticised by the DPA (formerly Disabled Persons Assembly). A spokesperson told the New Zealand Herald: "Disabled people have been telling Social Welfare for years that we want to work, but we want the appropriate kind of work".

In July 2013, the Unemployment Benefit was renamed "Jobseeker Support", and also incorporated those on the Sickness Benefit and Domestic Purposes Benefit – Women Alone, and those on the Domestic Purposes Benefit – Sole Parent and Widow's Benefit where their youngest child is aged 14 and over.

=== Domestic Purposes Benefit (Sole Parent Support) ===
The Domestic Purposes Benefit (DPB) was introduced in 1974 following the Report of the Royal Commission of Inquiry into Social Security. It provides State financial support primarily for single parents, irrespective of whether the other parent was contributing to maintenance payments (a feature of earlier legislation) and irrespective of fault. While there was a Widow's Benefit for women with children whose partner had died, this was not available to men.

Until July 2013, there were three forms of Domestic Purposes Benefit:

- DPB – Sole Parent
- DPB – Care for the Sick or Infirm
- DPB – Woman Alone

The rate of payment of a DPB is greater than the rate paid for the Unemployment Benefit and the Sickness Benefit. The rate of payment for the DPB: Care for the Sick or Infirm is the same as for the Invalid's Benefit.

People receiving DPB – Sole Parent are encouraged to name the other partner and to seek child support payments. There is a financial penalty for Sole Parents (section 70A of the Social Security Act 1964) who do not seek child support without sufficient reason. Any child support payments are generally used to offset the State cost of the DPB payment, with any excess going to the sole parent.

At the end of December 2012, 109,118 people were receiving DPB – Sole Parent, of which around 12% were male.

In July 2013, the DPB Women Alone and DPB Care for the Sick or Infirm were removed, with those on them moving to the unemployment benefit (Jobseeker Support) and the new Supported Living Payment respectively. The DPB Sole Parent was renamed "Sole Parent Support" at the same time.

=== Health benefits (Sickness Benefit and Invalid's Benefit) ===
==== Social Security Act 1938 ====
Two types of health benefits were introduced with the 1938 legislation, the Invalid's Benefit and the Sickness Benefit.

The Invalid's Benefit is paid to those permanently incapacitated or totally blind (excluding those already receiving an age benefit). An applicant must have been at least 16 years of age and residentially qualified. The applicant was residentially qualified when their incapacity arose in New Zealand or they were resident in New Zealand on 4 September 1936 and had lived in New Zealand for at least 10 years immediately before applying for the benefit. In 2007 the residence requirement was set at two years.

The Sickness Benefit is payable to those who are temporarily incapacitated from working through sickness or accident, excluding the first seven days of incapacity. To qualify, an applicant must have suffered a loss of salary, wages, or other earnings, and have resided in New Zealand for at least 12 months. The rate of benefit at the time it was introduced could not exceed the loss of earnings through incapacity. The rate now is currently the same as the Unemployment Benefit. As with other benefits introduced in 1938, the applicant had to be over 16 years of age.

==== Controversies ====
In 2006 the government was accused of exaggerating drops in unemployment by transferring people to Sickness Benefits, welfare commentator Lindsay Mitchell wrote in an October 2006 press release "There is a constant flow between benefits. Taking this into account the net gain from the unemployment benefit to the sickness benefit over the five years to April 2005 was 20,870. Over the same period the net gain from the Sickness Benefit to Invalid's Benefit was 26,302, bearing in mind the same beneficiary may have been transferred more than once."

Ruth Dyson, Minister for Social Development and Employment, reported, "...the main reason for people leaving the unemployment benefit is to enter paid work. In the last 8 years, 8.8 percent of all unemployment benefit cancellations were the result of a transfer to the sickness benefit, and less than one-third of 1 percent of all unemployment benefit cancellations were the result of a transfer to the invalids benefit. Those figures should finally put to rest the accusation that the Opposition spokesperson on social welfare consistently makes that these outstanding figures for the reduction in those on the unemployment benefit are as a result of a transfer to another benefit. That is not true; they are the result of people moving into paid work."

On 26 October 2006 the government announced a number of changes to the welfare system. Then Minister for Social Development and Employment David Benson-Pope later stated that, when implemented, the reforms will move between 3,000 and 6,000 people off the Sickness Benefit.

=== Supplementary benefits ===
In addition to main benefits such as Unemployment Benefit, Superannuation, Sickness Benefit and Invalid's Benefit, a person may be entitled to other assistance depending on their circumstances. Examples of other assistance available at 1 December 2011 are:

- Accommodation Supplement – a weekly payment to assist people with the cost of rent, board or owning a home.
- Childcare Subsidy – a payment that helps families with the cost of pre-school childcare.
- Disability Allowance – a weekly payment to assist people who have regular ongoing costs because of a disability.
- Home Help – a payment to assist new parents of multiples with the cost of domestic help.

A full list of benefits is available on the Work and Income website.

== Pensions ==
=== Superannuation ===
In 1898 the New Zealand government introduced a means-tested old-age pension for those 65 years and older. This established some key features of public pensions in New Zealand, such as the use of general government spending rather than individual contributions, and a "pay as you go" rather than an actuarial approach to funding.

The 1938 Social Security Act lowered the age for the means-tested pension to 60, and introduced a universal (not means-tested) superannuation from age 65. The universal pension catered to a strong demand for universal payments, while the lowered age for the means-tested pension provided for the likes of manual workers who were worn out and still poor at the age of 60.

The Third Labour government introduced a compulsory superannuation scheme in 1975, according to which employees and employers each contributed at least 4 per cent of gross earnings. Rob Muldoon's Third National government abolished the Labour scheme the following year, and in 1977 set up a universal (not means-tested) scheme called National Superannuation that paid 80% of the average wage to married people over 60. National Superannuation was renamed New Zealand Superannuation in 1993. The age of eligibility became 61 in 1992, then gradually increased to 65 between 1993 and 2001. Those receiving New Zealand Superannuation can receive some subsidised goods and services through use of the SuperGold Card.

A compulsory retirement savings scheme was designed as an outcome of the coalition agreement between the National Party and the New Zealand First Party following the 1996 general election. The proposed scheme, when put to a referendum in 1997 gained only 8 percent support, with 92 per cent of votes rejecting it. A move to a partially pre-funded or "smoothed pay-as-you-go" system came with the establishing of the New Zealand Superannuation Fund under the aegis of Labour Minister of Finance Michael Cullen in 2001.

In July 2007 the Fifth Labour Government introduced KiwiSaver as a voluntary retirement-savings scheme on top of New Zealand Superannuation. Employees choose to contribute 3%, 4% or 8% of their gross earnings, with employers contributing 3%, and the government contributing a $1000 "kick-start" when an employee joins KiwiSaver as well as 50c per dollar on the first $1043 contributed by the employee each year. The savings are privately managed in a scheme of the person's choosing (if they don't choose a scheme, the government assigns them one), with the government's role limited to regulation and to the collecting and passing on of contributions via the PAYE tax system. An added incentive for younger people is the ability to make a one-off withdrawal from their KiwiSaver fund to help to buy their first home. While KiwiSaver remains completely voluntary, 2.15 million New Zealanders actively contributed to KiwiSaver schemes as of June 2013, equal to 56 percent of the country's population under 65.

As of 1 December 2011, people may receive New Zealand Superannuation if they are:

- aged 65 or over
- a New Zealand citizen or permanent resident
- a resident of New Zealand at the time they apply

They must also have lived in New Zealand for at least 10 years since they turned 20 with five of those years being since they turned 50. Time spent overseas in certain countries and for certain reasons may be counted for New Zealand Superannuation.

The government taxes New Zealand Superannuation at a rate which depends on recipients' other income. The amount of superannuation paid depends on the person's household situation. For a married couple the net of tax amount is set by legislation to be no less than 65% of the net average wage, although the Fifth Labour Government increased payments to ensure it is no less than 66% of the net average wage. Local-government rates are also payable for superannuitants living alone and for single people in shared accommodation.

New Zealand is one of only four countries that have flat-rate universal superannuation, the others being Canada, Denmark and Russia. One quarter of the state's core operating expenditure in New Zealand goes on superannuation.

=== War pensions ===
People who have served in any war or other emergency in which New Zealand forces have served, and have a disability, may be able to get a Veteran's Pension instead of Superannuation. Veteran's Pension is paid at the same rate as New Zealand Superannuation but unlike Superannuation, payments are not reduced should a veteran require long term hospital care.

Disabled veterans may also be able to get a War Disablement Pension. Surviving partners of veterans may be able to get a Surviving Spouses Pension.

Veteran's Affairs New Zealand administers these and other entitlements for veterans and their families covered under the War Pensions Act 1954.

== Family benefits and tax credits ==
The 1911 Widow's pension provided to some extent for families without other means of support, but it was subject to means testing. A family allowance was introduced in 1926, payable at two shillings a week for each child over two years old, but still subject to means testing. The Social Security Act of 1938 extended and modified existing pension arrangements, and added a social security tax to pay for them.

A woman with two children received the equivalent of at least a full day's pay for a labourer as benefits, unlike wages, were not taxed. Most women received more as the average number of children born to mothers in the 1950s was 3.4.

— Ann Beaglehole, Benefiting Women: Income Support for Women, 1893–1993, p 10

On 1 April 1946, the family benefit was increased to 10 shillings a week and the means test was dropped. The social security tax was raised but this was compensated for by the dropping of the national security (war) tax. This increased family benefit was payable for all children up to the age of sixteen, or up to the end of the year when the child turned eighteen if they were in full-time education or unable to earn a living due to incapacitation.

Since the benefit was normally paid to the mother, many women gained their first ever independent source of household income. The family benefit was increased to 15 shillings per week per child in 1958–59, and was able to be capitalised up to a maximum of £1000 when buying, altering, or paying off a home from 1959 to 1960.

Universal payment of the Family Benefit was abolished to target families most in need and Family Benefit capitalisation limits for first-home seekers were increased (1985). A new family support benefit (introduced as the family care benefit in 1984) raised the incomes of some poor families. In 1986 the guaranteed minimum family benefit was introduced. This fixed an income floor above the statutory minimum wage for persons with dependant children in full-time employment. Known as the Guaranteed Minimum Family Income, it guaranteed working families roughly 80% of the average post-tax wage, although its impact on participation rates was limited by rising unemployment and high effective marginal tax rates.

Family benefits were abolished on 1 April 1991. Before 2018, they were partly replaced by more targeted allowances for low-income families until the introduction of the BestStart Payment.

=== Working for Families ===
In 2004 the Labour-led coalition government introduced the Working for Families package as part of the 2004 Budget. It was progressively implemented between October 2004 and April 2007.

The package, which commenced operating on 1 April 2005, has three primary aims: to make work pay; to ensure income adequacy; and to support people into work. It replaced the system known as Family Support as well as the child components of the main social welfare benefits. The Guaranteed Minimum Family Income was renamed the Minimum Family Tax Credit and the level of support was changed to encourage working families to leave the benefit system.

The Working for Families package includes several components:

- Working for Families Tax credits
- increases in Childcare Assistance
- increases in Accommodation Supplement payments
- changes to some benefit rules

Because parts of the package use tax credits it is also delivered by the Inland Revenue Department.

The package is thought to cover approximately 75% of all families with dependent children.

=== Families Package ===
In 2018 the Sixth Labour Government implemented numerous measures to reduce acute hardship and provide assistance for families. Among these the Family Tax Credit, Orphans Benefit, Accommodation Supplement and Foster Care Allowance substantially increased while benefits were indexed to wage growth instead of the Consumer Price Index. A new universal payment for families, BestStart, was also introduced.

== Minimum wage ==
There are three types of the minimum wage depending on the stage of worker: adult worker, starting out, or trainee/apprentice.

The minimum wage rates are reviewed every year and are gross amounts before tax. Since 1 April 2023, the adult minimum wage rate that applies to most employees aged 16 or over has been $22.70 an hour. The starting-out minimum rate is $18.16 per hour, and this applies to 16- and 17-year-olds for their first six months of employment, after which they become eligible for the adult minimum wage rate.

As of April 2026, the minimum wage is $24.95 per hour, and the starting-out and training minimum wage is $19.16 per hour.

== History of changes ==
=== Liberal Government reforms ===
Among the early forms of social welfare in New Zealand was the old age pension, introduced by the Liberal Government in 1898. The scheme was introduced to avoid what MP William Pember Reeves described as the "worst social evils and miseries", referring to the British workhouses where the elderly lived in spartan institutional circumstances. The pension scheme was non-contributory and was available only to the "deserving poor" – men and women who had become destitute through no fault of their own. The prime responsibility for protecting individuals from the hazards of sickness and unemployment lay with individuals themselves, their families and various charity organisations.

A decade later a widows' pension was introduced for women with children who had lost their husbands. The Liberals also passed the Workers Dwellings Act in 1905, allowing the government to buy land, build houses, and rent them to workers and their families. The small-scale scheme that resulted from this legislation can be seen as a precursor to the much larger state housing introduced by the first Labour government in the 1930s.

=== First Labour Government ===
The 1935 election was won by the first Labour government. A regular unemployment benefit was introduced with the passing of the Social Security Act in 1938. Under the Act the Government introduced a raft of social welfare benefits, mostly means tested, that were more generous and covered more people than before. The welfare state they created was a male wage-earners welfare state. Alongside policies to create full employment were policies to set fair wages sufficient for a man to provide for a family.

=== Change in approach in the 1980s ===
By 1984 the political culture changed, with social welfare targeted according to need, not distributed universally according to citizenship. The fourth Labour government did not overtly change the main welfare system, however, real expenditure per benefit recipient fell. Some benefits were removed such as the unemployment benefit for under-18-year-olds, and funding for state housing was cut back. These changes were somewhat ad hoc in nature.

=== Cutbacks of the 1990s ===
In the early 1990s the fourth National government embarked on a free market programme aimed at reducing public spending and 'dependence on the state'. Welfare benefits were drastically cut in December 1990 and 'user-pays' charges were introduced for many formerly free public services. As a result, these policies were widely known as "Ruthanasia" after Finance Minister Ruth Richardson, although the welfare portfolio was managed by Social Welfare Minister Jenny Shipley who oversaw major cuts in her portfolio and abolished the Universal Family Benefit. An attempt in 1994 to end the Special Benefit was opposed by the Labour Party (who ostensibly abolished it in 2004) and community organisations.

The impact of these changes was particularly pronounced as the unemployment rate was high due to the 1987 stockmarket crash and the cost-cutting programmes of the previous fourth Labour government, which had reduced the staff of many state services. The cutbacks were, however, only partially reversed by the fifth Labour government but inflation meant that in real terms benefits are still lower before April 1991.

By this time the Government had moved away from a policy of full employment and universal welfare to a more targeted system. The programme of reforms had a bias in favour of families, in particular working families and were intended to make it more attractive for beneficiaries to move into the workforce.

=== Work focused support in the 21st century ===
Announced in October 2006 the Working New Zealand reform includes changes to the service delivery of Work and Income and changes to the Social Security Act 1964. Amending legislation was passed by the Parliament of New Zealand in June 2007 including introducing a 'Purpose and Principles' section.

The government says the changes will introduce an intensive employment support to every New Zealander who is receiving a benefit and is able to work.

Working New Zealand involved:

- extending employment assistance to Independent Youth, Domestic Purposes, Sickness and Invalid's Benefit clients
- setting stronger work expectations for clients in some circumstances
- providing targeted employment initiatives to reduce the high Maori Unemployment Benefit rate
- offering a Job Search Service for all work-ready clients
- continuing to align rules and criteria of different benefits.

From September 2007 there have been a number of changes to the delivery of welfare benefits, the changes focus mainly on youth with a goal of having all 15-year-olds to 19-year-olds engaged in employment, training or education. People applying for the Unemployment Benefit will be required to undertake work or training-related activities in the period between their first contact with Work and Income and their benefit commencing. They will also be required to look for and accept any offer of suitable work during that time. Similar new measures will also apply to people on Sickness and Invalid Benefits, and the Domestic Purposes Benefit. Beneficiaries could have their benefits cut by up to 50% if they fail to comply.

Criticisms

In 2004 the Special Benefit was abolished and replaced with a new Temporary Support Assistance, this attracted criticism from the Child Poverty Action Group. Related new measures were also criticised by the DPA (formerly Disabled Persons Assembly) a spokesperson told the New Zealand Herald "Disabled people have been telling Social Welfare for years that we want to work, but we want the appropriate kind of work".

Susan St John and Louise Humpage have also commented that the changes "wipes away any notion that our social security system is about ensuring everyone can participate as citizens. Instead, it makes getting people into a job, any job, the fundamental duty of citizenship."

Further changes were expected, including further welfare benefit simplification in 2008. However, this did not eventuate before the November 2008 general election. After the election, the newly elected National Government proposed and implemented alternative reforms under the title "Future Focus" and established a Welfare Working Group to report on further reforms.

=== Historical welfare trends in New Zealand ===
The benefit level for a married couple in relation to earnings in New Zealand (1961–78):

Year ended	Benefit actual	Benefit level proportion of after tax average earnings	Benefit real value ($1978 prices)
March 1961	17.00	61.8%	57.40
March 1962	17.00	59.9%	56.32
March 1963	17.31	58.8%	56.07
March 1964	17.81	58.0%	56.44
March 1965	18.68	57.4%	54.90
March 1966	19.20	56.4%	56.79
March 1967	20.85	58.9%	56.76
March 1968	21.50	58.8%	58.04
March 1969	22.30	58.0%	57.61
March 1970	23.83	57.8%	58.88
March 1971	26.13	56.6%	59.78
March 1972	28.67	54.2%	59.70
March 1973	34.00	58.3%	66.59
March 1974	38.62	58.6%	69.14
March 1975	44.36	59.6%	71.06
March 1976	51.26	61.2%	70.97
March 1977	59.44	63.8%	70.94
March 1978	68.26	66.9%	71.07

- Note 1 by Brian Easton: Average earnings equals surveyed earnings of labour Department (including overtime), with average tax on employees deducted. This is a combination of the male and female rates.
- Note 2 by Brian Easton: From Dec 1973 there may be additional supplements including Christmas Bonus (to Dec 1977), Additional Benefit (from 1975) and concessions on some commodities.

== See also ==
- Structural discrimination in New Zealand
