= Working for Families =

New Zealand legislation

In 2004, the New Zealand Labour government introduced the Working for Families package as part of the 2004 budget. The package, which effectively commenced operating on 1 April 2005, had three primary aims: to make work pay; to ensure income adequacy; and to support people "into work".

The main component resembles the United Kingdom Working Tax Credit.

Both the New Zealand Ministry of Social Development and Inland Revenue have involvement in jointly delivering the package.

== Components of the package ==
The scheme pays "Working for Families Tax credits" (formerly known as Family Assistance) to families with dependent children to help with the cost of raising a family. Dependent children are defined as aged 18 or under who are not in full-time employment. The Working for Family tax credits include four types of payments:

1. Family tax credit: provides ongoing support for beneficiary and working families with dependent children
2. In-work tax credit: available to working families only
3. Minimum family tax credit: paid to working families to ensure they earn a minimum annual income after tax
4. Best start: paid to assist with the costs of a new baby

The Working for Families package also included additional help with childcare and accommodation, with increases in amounts of the existing Accommodation Supplement and the existing Childcare Assistance.

=== Family Tax Credit ===
Formerly known as Family Support, the Family Tax Credit gets paid to families with dependent children aged 18 or younger. There is no employment requirement to qualify for the Family Tax Credit.

The amount paid depends on:

- total annual family income before tax
- the number of dependent children
- the age of dependent children

The maximum amount of family tax credit increases with the age and number of children. An eldest child garners a higher amount.

For an eldest dependent child aged 16 to 18, the maximum tax credit increases by $13 a week. For dependent children (other than the eldest) aged 13 to 15, the maximum tax credit increases by $8 a week. For dependent children (other than the eldest) aged 16 to 18, the maximum tax credit increases by $29 a week.

=== In-work Tax Credit ===
Formerly known as In-work Payment, the In-Work Tax Credit replaced the Child tax credit from 1 April 2006. It is paid to families with dependent children (aged 18 or younger) who work.

Families do not qualify if they receive a main form of state assistance through social welfare.

From 2006 this amount was paid to a maximum of $60 per week for 1 to 3 children, with an additional $15 per week for the fourth and any additional children (thus a family with five children could receive a maximum of $90 per week). The maximum amount was changed in Budget 2015 to be $72.50 per week, implemented on 1 April 2016.

=== Minimum Family Tax Credit ===
Formerly known as family tax credit, and prior to that as guaranteed minimum family income, the Minimum Family Tax Credit aims to ensure that the total annual income of a family with dependent children 18 or younger, who work the required number of hours per week, does not fall below a set level. The minimum family tax credit usually applies if annual family income is $27,768 or less after tax.

Families must work at least 30 hours a week (for a couple) and 20 hours a week (for a sole parent). They do not qualify if they receive a main form of state assistance through social welfare.

The annual and weekly amounts are amended every tax year.

Families who earn a lesser amount from employment, and who are not receiving an income-tested form of social assistance, will receive a payment equal to the difference between their income and the minimum income level.

=== Best Start ===
Best Start is a payment of $60 a week for families with a new baby. Families who qualify for Best Start will get the payment until their baby turns 1, no matter how much they earn. They can still get Best Start until their child turns 3 if they earn under $93,858.

Parents receiving paid parental leave or income-tested social welfare do not qualify for this payment.

== Assessment of income ==
The authorities assess income for tax credit purposes based on a "household", which will consist of the pooled resources from up to two adults in any family with dependent children.

Nearly all households earning under $70,000 a year, many households with children earning up to $100,000 a year, and some earning more, qualify to receive assistance.

== Withdrawal of tax credits ==
The level of assistance to individual households depends on their income and on the number and age of children.

The rate of withdrawal (the abatement rate) for the Family Tax Credit, Parental Tax Credit and the In-Work Tax Credit comprises 20%. An abatement-free threshold of $36,350 exists.

The Minimum Family Tax Credit consists of a "top-up" payment, so that regardless of the amount of income earned, it gets topped up to the minimum amount per week (currently $534 after tax). This comprises effectively a 100% withdrawal with earned income up to the set income-level.

Some New Zealand households also receive money from the increased income-thresholds and rates for Accommodation Supplement and Childcare Assistance. These two types of assistance have separate withdrawal rates.

== Impact and level of take-up ==
Under current payment rates and abatement rates the New Zealand Government has stated that three out of four families would qualify for extra financial assistance under the Working for Families package.

In the tax year from 1 April 2005 to 31 March 2006 approximately 285,000 families received Working for Families Tax Credits. In August 2006 beneficiary families received an average of $110 per week of tax-credits, an increase of $30 per week compared to August 2004. Families paid by Inland Revenue received an average of $138 per week of tax-credits, an increase of $54 per week.

The Former Minister of Social Development and Employment David Benson-Pope stated that Working for Families had made beneficiaries better off by around $31.00 per week, and working families by around $64.00 per week, with the April 2007 increase lifting families' incomes further. Estimates suggest that Working for Families has reduced child poverty by 70% since its introduction. This would equate to at least 70,000 children lifted out of income poverty by Working for Families.

Former Minister David Benson-Pope also stated that Working for Families had made it easier for some women to start work, while in other families it had made it easier for one partner to spend more time at home.

A government evaluation (see below) has found that the number of Domestic Purposes Benefit recipients since the Working for Families package has fallen by 8,000.

== Opinions on the package ==
The Working for Families package has received a mixed response. Some (such as Victoria University Professor Robert Stephens) have praised the package for encouraging adults to come off benefits, and for targeting families in need.

Others, however, have criticised the package for potentially extending to the relatively wealthy and for increasing effective marginal tax rates for many people. The economist Gareth Morgan, for example, commented on how some (generally middle-income) people can face effective marginal tax rates of over 100%.

The package (with the exception of the family tax credit, accommodation and childcare components) does not extend to families on the Domestic Purposes Benefit, or to families not in work. Critics say this social group will become worse off, and get left further behind (relatively speaking) by not having access to the in-work tax credit and minimum family tax credit components.

The Child Poverty Action Group has commenced legal proceedings against the New Zealand Government for discriminating against those not in employment in the "Working for Families" package. The case focuses on the In-Work Tax Credit and on the Child Tax Credit it replaced. The Action Group estimates that at least 175,000 children have been "left behind". In a judgement from the Human Rights Review Tribunal, it was stated that the in-work tax credit payment is discriminatory, but in this case, is justified. The Action Group are appealing the decision claiming the discrimination is not justified.

Susan St John has supported poverty-prevention over poverty-alleviation, advocating policies such as a simple universal basic payment indexed to wages as well as prices for pensioners – not conditional on work. She criticises the Working for Families package for not delivering extra income until 2005, provided nothing for the poorest in 2006 and only a small increase in 2007. She states: "a large part of Working for Families is based on the flawed logic that all families need to escape poverty is an incentive to get off benefits."

Phil O’Reilly has included Working for Families in a list of alleged low-quality governmental spending that has purportedly contributed to higher interest-rates and lower productivity rates.

Some find the very name of the "Working for Families" package ambiguous. While supporters portray "working for families" as meaning "making efforts for the benefit of families", others interpret the phrase as "[giving] families work to perform".

John Key called the scheme "communism by stealth" but did not repeal or cut back the Working for Families tax credits, during his time as prime minister.

== Evaluations and research ==
The first formal government evaluation of the Working for Families package describes public awareness of the package and details classes of recipients of Working for Families entitlements to the end of August 2006. The report cites a high level of awareness of the overall package and a high level of receipt of Working for Families payments, meeting or exceeding original forecasts. Since the introduction of the package, the number of families receiving the Domestic Purposes Benefit has fallen by 8,000; with 2,600 recipients cancelling the benefit since the implementation of the In-Work Tax Credit. – While awareness of the package and its advertising appears high, the evaluation-report found that only around three-quarters of people who believe they receive a tax credit actually did so when matched to administrative records. Further, of the people surveyed who did receive a tax credit only two-thirds realised that they did.

Several articles have addressed the potential or theoretical impacts of the Working for Families package.

One study by Auckland University economist Tim Maloney and American welfare-reform researcher John Fitzgerald found that, on average, working mothers spent an extra three hours a week working after the 2005 and 2006 changes from the Working for Families package. Initial speculation suggested that working hours would fall as the higher income paid to families with dependent children would mean that mothers could spend less time in work. Maloney believes that "some women already working were probably increasing their hours worked in order to qualify for family assistance payments". The authors class the results as preliminary – given the relatively recent introduction of the Working for Families package.

A study found that changes in neither In-Work Tax Credit, nor Family Tax Credit were associated with any meaningful changes in self-rated health, a measure of general health status. However, the study found that each additional year of receiving Family Tax Credit led to a very small reduction in self-rated health, but it did not impact tobacco smoking among parents.

Further evaluations completed by the Ministry of Social Development and Inland Revenue include:

- The summary report of the evaluation of the Working for Families package.
- Receipt of Working for Families
- Receipt of Working for Families – 2007 Update
- Employment incentives for sole parents: Labour market effects of changes to financial incentives and support
- Employment incentives for sole parents: Labour market effects of changes to financial incentives and support. Technical report.

== Timeline ==
=== October 2004 ===
Announcement of the Working for Families package as part of the 2004 Budget. The first changes came into effect from October 2004. Changes included:

- Abatement of Accommodation Supplement removed for beneficiaries
- Accommodation Supplement entry and abatement thresholds increased for non-beneficiaries
- Childcare and OSCAR Subsidy rates increased and aligned, and income thresholds increased

=== April 2005 ===
Stage One of Working for Families implementation applied from 1 April 2005 (with a further implementation deliverable released in October 2005). The changes included:

- Family tax credit rates increased by $25 for the first child and $15 for additional children
- The child component of main income-tested benefits moved into the family tax credit amount
- Foster Care Allowance, Unsupported Child's Benefit and Orphan's Benefit rates increased by $15 per week
- Accommodation Supplement maximum rates increased in some areas with high housing costs
- Family tax credit became treated as income for Special Benefit, with standard costs set at 70% of main benefit plus family tax credit for people with children
- Childcare and OSCAR Subsidy rates increased by another 10%

=== April 2006 ===
Stage Two of Working for Families implementation applied from 1 April 2006. The changes included:

- The in-work tax credit replaced the Child Tax Credit: it pays up to $60 per week for families with three children, and up to an extra $15 per week for each other child
- The minimum family tax credit threshold increased from $15,080 to $17,680
- A single higher abatement threshold of $35,000 replaces the two family tax credit abatement thresholds of $20,356 and $27,481
- The 18% abatement rate applying to the lower abatement threshold for family tax credit vanishes completely and the 30% rate applying to the higher abatement threshold reduces to 20%
- Introduction of the Temporary Additional Support to replace Special Benefit.

=== April 2007 ===
Stage Three involves the final components of Working for Families implementation and applied from 1 April 2007. The changes include:

- Family tax-credit rates increased by $10 per week per child
- The income-threshold for the minimum family tax-credit increased to $18,044
- Regular inflation-adjustment put in the Income Tax Act 2007 to prevent the erosion of payments over time. Family tax credit amounts and abatement-free threshold to increase when inflation reaches a cumulative five per cent. Minimum family tax credit to be reviewed annually. In-work tax credit and parental tax credit to be reviewed every three years.

=== April 2008 ===
- The after-tax income threshold for the minimum family tax credit increased to $18,460

=== October 2008 ===
While the package had been completely implemented with the final stage on 1 April 2007, the Income Tax Act 2007 provided for regular adjustments to rates based on cumulative movements in the New Zealand Consumer Price Index; a minimum movement of 5% was required before rates would be amended. These increases would apply from the following 1 April of a year when a change was triggered based on actual data published by Statistics New Zealand.

As part of the 2008 Budget, the Labour Government amended the Income Tax Act 2007 to increase the rates of family tax credit and the abatement-free level by an anticipated movement in Consumer Price Index of 5.22%. The increases would occur from 1 October 2008. This has required the Inland Revenue department to develop composite rates and income limits for the tax year 1 April 2008 to 31 March 2009 (the average between the annual amount before 1 October 2008 and the annual amount after 1 October 2008 inflation adjustment).

- The previous abatement-free threshold was $35,000. From 1 October 2008 it increased to $36,827. The composite threshold for the year was $35,914

=== April 2009 ===
- The after-tax income threshold for the minimum family tax credit increased to $20,540

=== April 2010 ===
- The after-tax income threshold for the minimum family tax credit increased to $20,800

=== October 2010 ===
As part of the 2010 Budget, the National Government amended the Income Tax Act 2007 to increase the amounts of family tax credit by an anticipated movement in Consumer Price Index of 2%; the expected result of the increase in GST rate from 12.5% to 15%. The increases apply from 1 October 2010. Composite amounts and income limits for the tax year 1 April 2010 to 31 March 2011 apply.

The indexation of the abatement-free threshold for Working for Families tax credits has been removed from the Income Tax Act 2007 and the abatement-free threshold will remain at $36,827. Future indexation of the family tax credit rates will ignore any price movement relating to tobacco in the Consumers Price Index.

=== April 2011 ===
- The after-tax income threshold for the minimum family tax credit increased to $22,204

== Bibliography ==
- New Zealand Government and Politics, edited by Raymond Miller, 4th edition, 2006, Melbourne: Oxford University Press. ISBN 978-0-19-558492-9
