= Child poverty in New Zealand =

New Zealand suffers from one of the highest rates of child poverty in the Western world. According to Statistics New Zealand, by the end of June 2022, 12% of all children (1 in 9) were directly affected by poverty. Historically, child poverty has had, and continues to have, a disproportionately high effect on Māori and Pasifika households, with 14.5% of Māori children and 19.5% of Pacific children living in poverty. These two ethnic groups continue to experience lingering effects of forced land alienation and immigration discrimination.

In 2011 around 285,000 children were living in poverty, as reported by the Child Poverty Action Group (Aotearoa New Zealand) (CPAG). However, as inequalities were exacerbated during the mid-2010s, exemplified by the a major housing crisis that began in Auckland, this figure increased to an estimated 295,000 children (1 in 6) in 2016.

The Ministry of Social Development recognises that:

Poverty in the richer nations is about relative disadvantage—it is about households and individuals who have a day-to-day standard of living or access to resources that fall below a minimum acceptable community standard.

In New Zealand, children living in poverty lack material things enjoyed by other children, which results in their social exclusion and alienation. More is expected than merely providing the essentials in a country that strives to support each individual citizen to reach their maximum productivity potential. Consequences of child poverty in New Zealand include: poor health, such as lower rates of vaccination, higher rates of avoidable child mortality, infant mortality, low birth weight, and child injury; reduced participation in early childhood education and young people leaving school with no or low qualifications; and higher rates of youth suicide, teenage imprisonment, and the victimisation of children. Efforts against child poverty in New Zealand include child-centred legislation, child specific representation in the decision-making process, as well as creating a Minister for Children in New Zealand. Professor Marie Johansson, an early education expert from Karolinska Children's Hospital in Sweden, spent some time working in Wellington, the capital of New Zealand. After her work, she stated that New Zealand needs to address child poverty "not [as] a political question; [but] it's an ethical question, it's a moral question".

== Background ==
The evolution of child poverty in New Zealand is associated with the 'Rogernomics' of 1984, the benefit cuts of 1991 and Ruth Richardson's "mother of all budgets", the child tax credit, the rise of housing costs, low-wage employment, and social hazards, both legal and illegal (i.e. alcoholism, drug addiction, and gambling addiction).

In 2004 26% of children were reported as living in serious or significant hardship, while at the same time only 4% of over-65-year olds were reported to be in those same circumstances. In response to this, the Working for Families (WFF) gave financial support to lower-middle income "working families with children", and saw child poverty fall from 28% in 2006 to 22% in 2007, and then again to 19% in 2008. However, the poorest families were not being reached, and, Child Poverty Action Group argued, were being discriminated against which prevented them from obtaining a benefit which was "rightfully theirs".

=== Overview of children's rights in New Zealand ===
A problem often encountered is that the rights of children are entangled with the rights of their parents and caregivers (limitations on which affect children).

==== Rights in New Zealand law ====
The Oranga Tamariki Act 1989 provides services for children, their parents and family to help with child care responsibilities with the aim of preventing children suffering harm, ill-treatment, abuse, neglect, and deprivation.

The Domestic Violence Act 1995, which offers counseling for victims of domestic violence and section 5(2) requires victim protection, access to the court system in a speedy, inexpensive, and understandable way while also appropriate support programs.

The Care of Children Act 2004 concerns the best arrangements of guardianship/ care of children, recognising their rights (section 3), and with the best interests of children as paramount (section five).

Currently New Zealand is adapting the Vulnerable Children's Bill which is an omnibus bill intended to strengthen child protection, and ensure fewer children are abused and neglected.

The resources in the Family Court, and the Department of Child, Youth and Family, are minimal, causing long delays in hearings, investigation, and final cases.

==== Rights in international law ====
New Zealand ratified the United Nations Convention on the Rights of the Child (UNCROC) in 1993 with three reservations which still stand: Article 22.1 regarding the rights of children with parents who are not legally allowed in New Zealand; Article 32.2 regarding the minimum age of employment; and Article 37 (c) regarding separate detainment facilities for children. Article 24 of UNCROC, which stems from the right to health, requires states to provide measures aiming to reduce infant and child mortality, develop primary health care systems for children, combat disease and malnutrition, ensure pre- and post-natal care for mothers, and spread awareness about child health and nutrition, including the advantages of breast feeding, hygiene and environmental sanitation, and the prevention of accidents.

Ten recommendations from the United Nations Human Rights Council Universal Periodic Review addressed child poverty issues in New Zealand.

== Measuring child poverty ==
=== Relative ===
A poverty threshold based on 60% of median disposable household income was widely accepted before the Child Poverty Reduction Act 2018 was passed. Using this measure, the child poverty rate was 14% in 1982 and increased drastically and in 1994 the poverty rate for children was 29%. This peaked at 30% in 2001, and saw a decline to 22% in 2007. From 2009 to 2012 the poverty rate held steady at 25%. In 2016 the poverty rate dropped to 20%. From 1984 through 2012 ages 0–17 remained the most impoverished age group within New Zealand. The pushing factors for the increasing poverty rate were slow wage growth, high unemployment, and a decrease in social expenditures.

The Child Poverty Reduction Act 2018 provides for several, updated measures of relative and absolute poverty. The primary measurement is 50% of the median income after housing costs for the 2017/2018 base financial year (AHC) while supplementary measures consist of 50% of the median before deducting housing costs and 40% of the median income after deducting housing costs.

=== Absolute ===
Material hardship refers to children who live in households where their caregivers cannot afford items that are considered essential. In 2007 and 2008 the deprivation rate among children was 18%, while it was 3% for those over 65 and 13% for the overall population. This is measured by calculating the proportion of households that lack three or more essential items out of a list of nine. The New Zealand Ministry of Social Development has created its own index to measure poverty based on material hardships: DEP-17, an index utilising 17 items that are considered essential for children. A score of 7+ is indicative of material hardship and a score of 9+ shows severe material hardship. The ministry collected data from 2008 to 2016. The highest rates of material hardship was seen in 2011 with households containing children aged 0–17 lacked 7+ items an average of 20% of the time and roughly 9% lacked 9+ items. These numbers steadily declined into 2016 where 12% of households lacked 7+ items and 6% lacked 9+ items.

=== Demographic considerations ===
Studies have shown the Māori and Pasifika (other Pacific groups) consistently rank higher when considering impoverishment compared to other European ethnicities. There is also a consistent finding that poverty rates for younger children were higher than those aged 12–17. From 2007 to 2014, income poverty rates remained the highest in households that had multiple children. in 2014 household with three or more children made up 45% of impoverished children.

== Causes of child poverty ==
=== Public spending priorities ===
In June 2011, while $9 billion was spent on the New Zealand Superannuation Fund, only $1.7 billion was spent on the Domestic Purposes Benefit, a bill supporting most of the 235,000 children in poverty, as well as their parents and caregivers.

The 2013 budget offered small amounts of extra social policy spending, relevant to children's wellbeing, such as:

- Increased spending on home insulation targeted at low-income households with children or elderly occupants or high health needs;
- Increased spending on rheumatic fever prevention; and
- Increased spending on early childhood education and schooling initiatives (although offset by other cutbacks in the sector).

In 2013, there was a conference held to address many of the issues that New Zealand was experiencing called the Children in Crisis Conference 2013. The conference was held to allow interested groups to discuss and seek evidence-based solutions to the current crisis. Key talking points were policy development, promoting reform, and publishing relevant articles. This was a three-day event that organised speakers and provided resources to current publications of that time. A full schedule of events and topics can be found on the conference website.

Comparatively, a decade later, the most recent 2023 budget emphasises,

- supporting New Zealanders with the cost of living
- delivering the services New Zealanders rely on
- recovery and resiliences, and
- fiscal sustainability

The New Zealand Treasury has budgeted over $2.5 billion to supporting New Zealanders with the pressures associated with the increasing cost of living. The Treasury has also dedicated over $223 million to Māori housing and infrastructure stating,

The ability for many Māori and Pacific peoples to have mana āheinga (the capability to decide on their aspirations and realise them) and build mana whanake (the power to grow sustainable, intergenerational prosperity) is impeded when health, education, housing and social welfare systems do not address multifaceted, intergenerational disadvantage. For this reason, we are making substantial investments in Māori and Pacific language, culture, and education; Pacific skills and employment; and Māori housing.

=== Intergenerational disadvantages: Māori children ===
Maori and Pasifika children continue to be affected by intergenerational disadvantages that are traced back to the colonisation of their native land starting in the 1830s. These long-lasting effects are not only observed in child development and experience, but throughout Māori and Pasifika lifetimes.

The colonisation of Aotearoa New Zealand by British rule resulted in the dispossession of ancestral land, resources, and native autonomy. This invasion led to violence, disease, and social disruption for the long-standing Māori communities, leading to many negative, systemic consequences for the Māori people exemplified in modern-day economic and health disparities that continue to negatively effect these communities. Statistics prove that there is a large disproportion of Māori and Pasifika people living in sub-optimal conditions with limited provided resources. These communities still carry deep-rooted trauma from the brutal injustices inflicted upon the native people in the 19th century and have influenced Māori culture. The trauma of colonisation has been passed down through generations and has affected the mental, emotional, spiritual, and physical health of the Māori people.

In hopes of establishing new British settlements, colonisers were most likely to seize the Māori peoples' most arable land, stripping the native people of their most precious resource. Settlers relocated large groups of the native people to small plots of land that were not suitable for farming, leaving them with little to no ability to provide food for themselves. Not only did physical separation of native people from their traditional land lead to disparity of resources and wealth, but severing the native people from "their whakapapa (genealogy), whenua (land), and tino rangatiratanga (self-determination)" was deemed to be damaging to their identity and well-being. The implementation of the British concept of private property alienated Māori people from their traditional land, distancing their communities from their native language and culture. These longstanding effects have "forever changed the Māori community landscape and while there has been work to rebuild what was lost, it is only a representation of the past."

Due to these intergenerational disadvantages, Māori youth are more likely to experience poverty, unemployment, and low educational attainment compared to their non-Māori counterparts. They are more likely to suffer from mental health disorders, substance abuse, and suicide which can cause unstable support systems as well as negative impacts on motivation and resilience. Māori youth are also much more likely to experience intergenerational trauma due to colonisation which continues to influence their relationship with their culture, language, sense of belonging, and identity. These statistics can be viewed as causes and effects of living in poverty. The reality is that effects become causes as the cycle of poverty continues over multiple generations.

== Effects on New Zealand children ==
In richer, more developed countries, such as New Zealand, poverty is not concerned with complete deprivation of essential resources. Rather it concerns limitations on resources, which prevents citizens from fully participating in society, and provokes their social exclusion.

=== Education ===
Child poverty undermines attempts for a secure education.

The New Zealand Education Act 1989 provides that state primary and secondary schooling is to be free. This is in accordance with article 26 of the Universal Declaration of Human Rights, Article 13 of the International Covenant on Economic, Social and Cultural Rights, Articles 28 and 29 of UNCROC, and Article 4 of UNESCO. The Human Rights Commission (New Zealand) reported in 2005 that some state schools were enforcing "compulsory donations", and there have been other reports of some state schools hiring debt collection agencies to pressure parents to pay these "donation fees."

The money spent by parents on non-core curriculum activities, stationery and other material costs, and uniforms, is not taken into account. In Michelle Egan-Bitran's project, "This is how I see it: Children, young people and young adults' views and experiences of poverty", children and young people were found to be aware of these hidden costs of going to school, and the ability to not take part in school trips, for example, was important for those whose families could not afford holidays, as they felt they were missing out on opportunities to be a part of community activities.

Can't afford school uniform… lack of books… left out… get picked on at school… stress… shame… low esteem… unhappy… lonely… sad… depressed… angry… feelings of worthlessness.

Lack of access to right of education may result in other human rights abuses and perpetuate the cycle of poverty.

From 2009 to 2016 the number of students leaving school with qualifications increased. The number of children leaving school with NCEA level 1 increased 8.5% and those achieving NCEA level 2 or higher increased 12.8% from 2009 to 2016. Māori and Pasifika children are below the national average for receiving qualifications. However, these groups have seen significant improvements over the stated time period. There is a correlation between the level of certification reached and the socioeconomic condition of the school. Schools in the lowest socioeconomic quintile in 2016 had 80% of children leave school with a NCEA level 1 or higher, whereas the highest quintile had about 95% of children reach this achievement. The disparity is much greater when comparing university entrance standards. About 38% of children attending schools in the lowest quintile achieved this while 67% of children attending schools in the highest quintile was able to leave school with this achievement.

=== Inequality ===
Differences in child well-being are more extreme in societies with greater income inequality. Conversely, countries with lower levels of inequality demonstrate higher levels of child well-being, and lower levels of child poverty. Inequality is known to affect a child's future life chances, health, education, and employment opportunities. Non-material inequality, such as a lack of voice, disrespect, shame, stigma, denial of rights and diminished citizenship, are all condensed for children.

=== Discrimination against beneficiary families ===
Of all New Zealand children, 22% live in families where the major caregiver receives income from a social security benefit. That is around 230,000, or one fifth, of New Zealand children. New Zealand has a long history of discrimination against, beneficiaries, especially the non-working poor.

The Working for Families (WFF) scheme, by lifting a family's income and making housing and childcare more affordable, was able to reduce child poverty. However, children whose parents cannot or will not work, are trapped in poverty and they miss out by association. Debt collection against beneficiaries intensifies the poverty experienced by their children. When a beneficiary's over-payment charge is taken, be it for genuine fraud or because of a departmental mistake, money is taken from a family's already low income, and traps children, as well as their parents/caregivers, in a poverty cycle. The deduction taken reduces a child's food, clothing, and access to school and the community. In New Zealand, Susan St. John explained it is as though,

"We have the deserving and undeserving poor in New Zealand."

Punishment for beneficiary fraud, often life repayments and in larger cases imprisonment, is a larger penalty suffered than others fraud offences in New Zealand.

In the case Osborne v Chief Executive of Ministry of Social Development [2010] 1 NZLR 559, the New Zealand High Court ruled that the 332 years that Linda Osborne would take to repay her debt was not of concern. It was also ruled the time spent she already in jail as punishment did not preclude any civil recovery of money. This system puts children's needs behind the ideologically driven desire to move sole parents (as well as other beneficiaries in the family) into paid work.

Claire Breen explains,

"The failure to address the issue of child poverty resulting from and perpetrating discrimination undermines attempts to secure education. For many children, the ensuing negative repercussions will affect many other rights in childhood and over the course if their lifetime. This failure can, in turn, serve to perpetuate the cycle of poverty and discrimination."

==== Child Poverty Action Group v Attorney General ====
In 2008 the Child Poverty Action Group (CPAG) took a case against the Attorney-General claiming provisions in the Income Tax Act 2007 were inconsistent with freedom from discrimination section 19 of the New Zealand Bill of Rights Act (NZBORA): this was the eligibility for tax credits under the WFF scheme. CPAG claimed it discriminated against children in families who would be eligible if it were not for the receiving of income benefit, or weekly compensation under the Injury Prevention, Rehabilitation and Compensation Act 2001, by one of the family members.

The Human Rights Tribunal found that,

"in our assessment the WFF package… involves less favourable treatment of families on an income-tested benefit, and… there is substantive disadvantage as a result."

The Court of Appeal (CA) recognised as an,

"undisputed fact that the issue of child poverty … is a serious one … Nor is there any dispute about the consequences of poverty for children in particular and for society more generally."

It was concluded that as under section 19 of the New Zealand Bill of Rights Act beneficiaries subject to the off-benefit rule were subject to 'prima facie' discrimination. But the CA also found that it was "justified discrimination" on the ground of employment status, as dictated by a democratic system.

=== Neglect and maltreatment ===
27% of New Zealand children (over a quarter) have witnessed family violence against an adult in the home. Children suffer from stress and disruption when they have to leave home because of domestic violence, and it also disrupts their education. Aviva family violence services explains that,

"When a child's developing brain is exposed to a pattern of abusive and controlling behaviour, or they are living in an environment of fear about the next angry outburst, the effects on the child can be carried through the rest of their life."

108 children aged 0–14 died from intentional injuries from neglect, assault, or maltreatment. From 2010 to 2014 it was found that 57% of all cases were female. When considering age groups during the same time period 57% of all deaths occurred during the first year of life. Contrary to death from intentional injuries where there was no statistically significant difference found on yearly numbers, hospitalisations due to neglect and maltreatment has seen an overall decrease 2001–2016. The total number of hospitalisations for children 0–14 for injuries resulting from neglect was about 225 in 2001 and there was approximately 160 cases in 2016. The most common injury resulting in hospitalisation was head injury and the highest number of cases were seen in children under the age of 1.

Shine's Safe@Home project is one solution that has been set up. It offers security upgrades for homes, allowing children to stay at home, and not have their lives disrupted. The project limits success to break in-attempts of potential perpetrators by changing locks and providing an alarm system that is linked to the police. The overall goal of the project is to prevent victimisation, increase health and well-being, and make the home a safer place. The project has been seen as an overall success, and Yolanda Meima has advocated for the programme to be implemented at the national level.

=== Health ===
In 2010, 150 children died because of preventable diseases. In the documentary "Inside Child Poverty: a special report", Dr Bryan Beatty, a general practitioner in East Porirua, reported seeing chest infections, skin infections, and upper respiratory infections. The documentary also pictured serious cases of scabies, and school sores. One out of a hundred children in New Zealand have a heart disease which is caused by rheumatic fever, which is caused by an untreated sore throat, and can lead to heart complications. New Zealand immunisation rates were placed 23rd out of 25 Organisation for Economic Co-operation and Development (OECD) countries by UNICEF, there are also higher rates of vaccine preventable diseases than in many similar countries. Not only is this preventable harm and pain, but children's health affects their education and their future employment outcomes as adults. The numbers for infant deaths within the first year of life were constant from 2006 through 2013. These numbers remain above the OECD average. In 2014 the infant mortality rate was comparable to the United States. The groups most affected by sudden unexpected death in infancy are the Māori and Pasifika groups. There are several other medical conditions with social gradient within the country: Asthma, bronchiolitis, and gastrointestinal diseases. An average of 28 children aged 0–14 died each year from 2010–2014 due to such diseases, and an average of 41,000 hospitalisations occurred from 2011–2015 for the same age group.

=== Housing ===
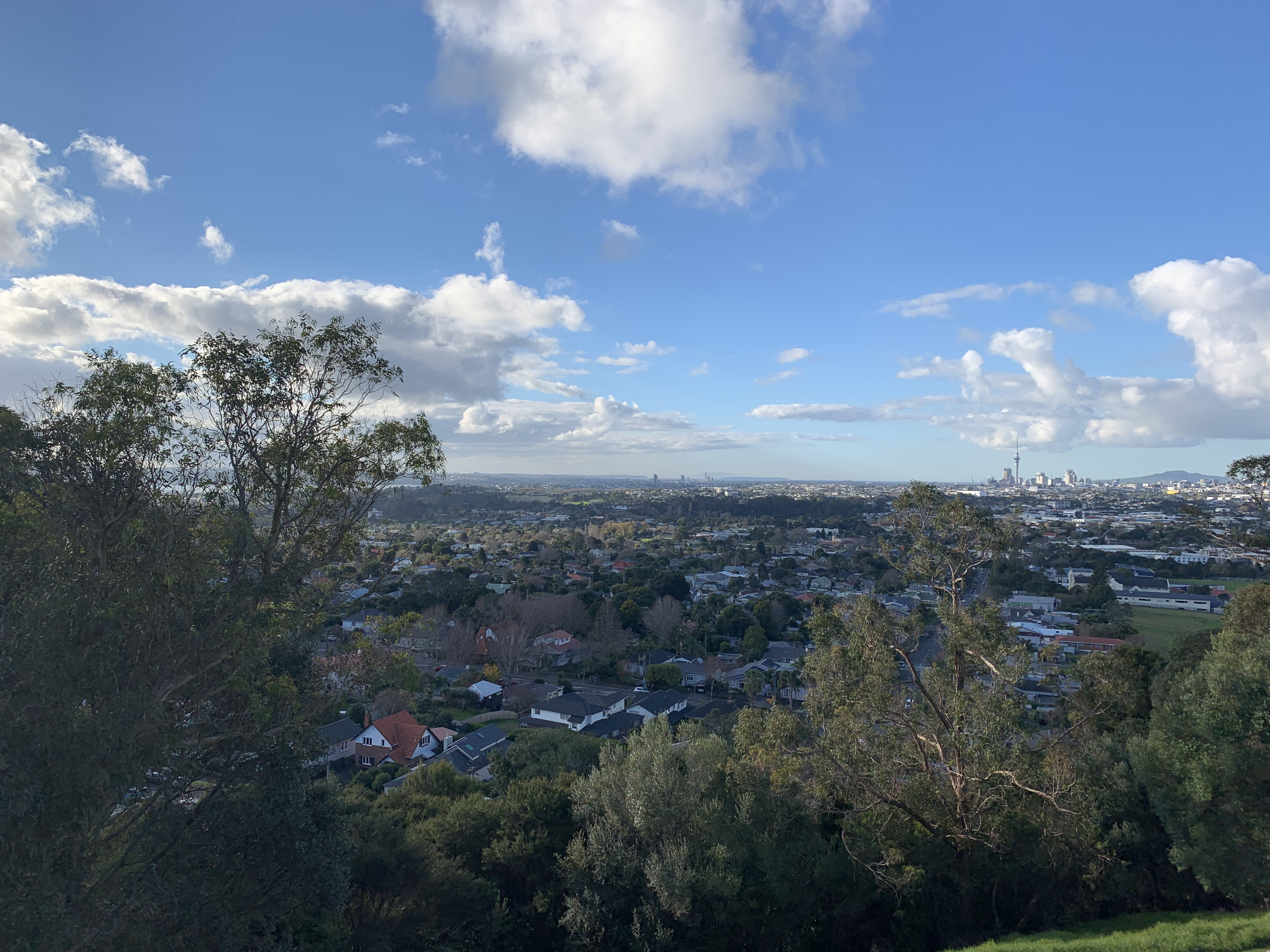
The housing costs continue to explode in Auckland, New Zealand causing a housing crisis that is damaging the lowest-income families in the country.

In 2010, 25,000 children, mostly from lower-income families, were admitted to hospital for preventable respiratory infections aggravated by poor houses. In New Zealand many of the health problems are related to the quality of New Zealand houses and housing standards in New Zealand, and overcrowding. Dr Michael Baker, Associate Professor of Public health at Otago University, recognises household crowding as the main risk factors for meningocele disease, rheumatic fever, and tuberculosis. This is an issue that greatly affects children as 75–80% of crowded households had children living in them. The highest levels of crowding seen from 2013 to 2015 were children ages 0–17 living in social housing. 33% of children living in social housing experienced overcrowding. Other issues of concern include dampness, mould, and having heat during the winter. Approximately 63% of households with children experienced major problems with damp and mould between 2013 and 2015 and approximately 75% of had major issues keeping the home warm during the winter. The greatest amount of all issues were seen in social housing. Housing costs influence directly the poverty experienced in low-income households with children.

== Efforts against child poverty ==
The Children's Commissioner laid forth 78 separate recommendations in their 2012 report Solutions to Child Poverty in New Zealand evidence for action. These recommendations are grouped into several categories:

=== Strategy and accountability ===
The OCC recommended to enact legislation that would help reduce child poverty in the country. This included legislation that would create five different measurements of poverty to build an accurate account of the situation, setting short and long term targets that would be reviewed at least every three years, and accelerating the rate of poverty reduction for heavily affected groups such as the Māori and Pasifika.

=== Tax credits and income support ===
They recommended changing how the family-tax credit is calculated. They want to see a higher tax credit for those aged 0–5, because research indicates that investing in child development at this age is crucial. This would be done incrementally to avoid financial struggle. They also recommended to eliminate differential payments based on the number of child in each household, and initially provide a flat rate for all children under the age of 16. To further help reduce poverty they want experts hired that specialise in child development in relation to the labour supply, all child-related benefits be reviewed to ensure they help in reducing poverty, and in the long-term create a new income support plan that would replace many of the preexisting government subsidies.

=== Child support ===
The OCC wished to see child-support payments to single-parent families who were receiving government support to still go to the parent. At the time all child-support payments made to parents in this situation were withheld by the government to offset the cost of government assistance. They also wished to force the government to make advanced child support payments when the non-custodial parent did not make the payments on time.

=== Employment and training ===
It was recommended that the government work with current industries to create a pathway for parents with low or no skills to attain training and education. This included a vocational pathway to ease the transition between secondary school and the workforce. They also wish to see a larger collaboration with the government and industry to ensure more family-friendly work environments. This is to ensure that there is a better overall work–life balance than previously existed. The idea of evaluating current unemployment programs for effectiveness was also proposed. The last thing recommended in this category was a low-interest loan be offered by the government for those looking to re-enter the workforce and in dire need of financial support.

=== Housing ===
The OCC stresses for a need of government monitoring for all rental units to ensure minimum health and safety standards are being met. Due to a serious lack of affordable housing they said that there needed to be an increase in social housing: They suggested that 2,000 units be added per year until 2020. They wanted better supervision for those companies providing social housing to include government monitoring for quality, accessibility, and financial stability. They wanted the government to create a point of contact separate from the housing agencies to properly assess housing needs. Finally they wished to see further research be funded for housing needs and how it affects children.

=== Māori and Pasifika children ===
The recommendation is for the government to take the necessary steps to reduce poverty levels within the Māori and Pasifika ethnic groups. They wanted the housing issues to be addressed for these communities, improved education, more people successfully transitioning to meaningful employment, enhanced health initiatives, and continued investment in research to properly address the issues at hand.

=== Debt ===
It was asked that the government consider income levels when enforcing debt payment to government agencies. This is to ensure that necessary funds are taken away from children that are already considered to be in poverty. It was also asked that the government provide education on how to properly budget a household income. Again it is recommended by the OCC that the government help establish a low or zero interest loan to allow low-income families to have affordable debt.

=== Health ===
The OCC advocated for a universal health assessment and implementation plan for children 0–5. The goal of this was to increase co-ordination between professionals, and ensure that a child would get the needed level at care no matter what professional they were seen by. It was suggested that there was a need for services to be provided on an as-need basis. Initially all children would receive the basic care that all children require, and if it was determined that if any extra care was required during childhood that it would be provided. It is also stated that there was a need to develop a national nutrition strategy as poor nutrition has historically been an issue within New Zealand. In hopes, these improvements in healthcare would eventually lead to free primary care for all children aged 0–17.

=== Education ===
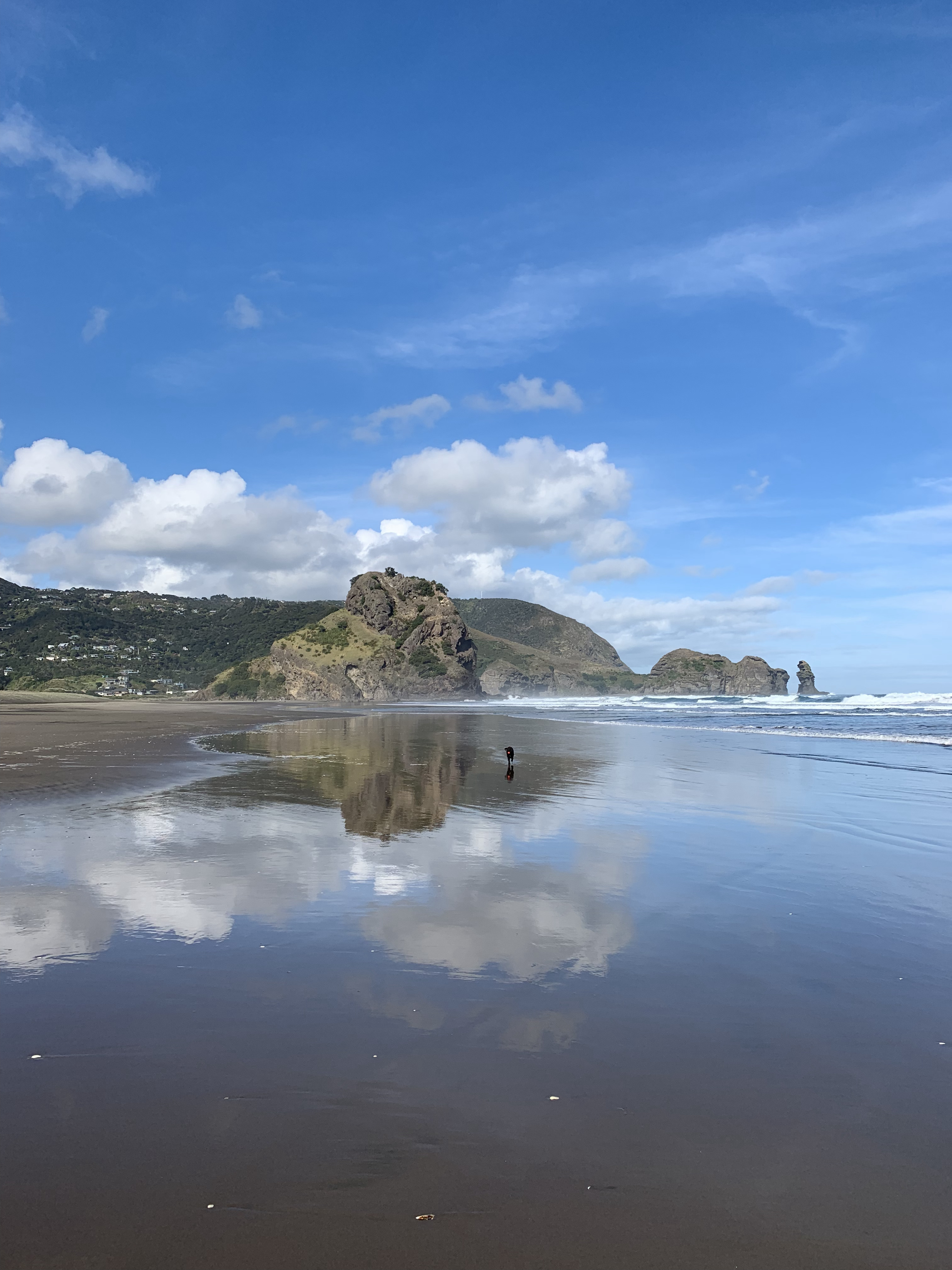
New Zealand has a variety of public spaces and parks that can be used to improve child experience.

It was highly encouraged that a food-in-school programme be implemented. A survey conducted in 2010 had found that over 20 percent of children did not have enough food for healthy active living. There was also a call for state funded health services within all secondary schools to alleviate some issues commonly seen with young people living in poverty including mental health issues, teen pregnancies, and drug and alcohol abuse. The OCC also recommended the government to expand before-school, after-school, and holiday programs for children living in poverty. This initiative would allow children to attain a proper education, while allow parents to competitively be involved in the labour market.

=== Local communities and families ===
The OCC recommends to evaluate current poverty-reducing activities already being implemented by communities throughout New Zealand. Once it finds the most effective activities it is encouraged that the government use this as a baseline for future programs. It is also suggested that parks and public spaces need to be welcoming to children. This is to ensure that children living in poverty can find safe space, even if it not available in the home environment. They also advised the government to support parenting programs so that even if individuals find themselves in a low-income situation they can still be positive role models for their children.

== See also ==
- New Zealand Child and Youth Epidemiology Service
- Children's Commissioner (New Zealand)
  - Oversight of Oranga Tamariki System Legislation Amendment Act 2025
- Oranga Tamariki (Ministry for Children)
- Human rights in New Zealand
- KidsCan
- Poverty in New Zealand
- Welfare in New Zealand

== Sources ==
- Dale, M. Claire; O'Brien, Mike; St. John, Susan (2011). Left further behind: how policies fail the poorest children in New Zealand (PDF). Child Poverty Action Group. ISBN 978-0-9582263-9-4. OCLC 754834878. Archived from the original (PDF) on 19 June 2020.
- Egan-Bitran, Michelle (2010). 'This is how I see it': children, young people and young adults' views and experiences of poverty (PDF). Office of the Children's Commissioner. ISBN 978-0-909039-31-8. OCLC 756914571.
- Wynd, Donna (2013). Benefit Sanctions: Creating an Invisible Underclass of Children? (PDF). Child Poverty Action Group. ISBN 978-0-9922586-3-4.
