= Children's right to adequate nutrition in New Zealand =

Every child has the right to adequate nutrition under the Universal Declaration of Human Rights. In New Zealand, an estimated 100,000 New Zealand children go to school every day without breakfast. Article 11 of the International Covenant on Economic, Social and Cultural Rights recognises 'the fundamental right for everyone to be free from hunger’.

In the Auckland region, there are approximately 43,000 children in decile 1 and 2 state schools. Of these 57% are Pasifika, 30% are Māori, and 4% are European. The remaining 9% are Asian/Middle Eastern and other ethnic groups. The Ministry of Health advised the Minister in 2006 that "decile one and two schools draw their students from our most vulnerable communities and cope with multiple issues related to poverty".

A 2002 Ministry of Health survey found that there is a high percentage of children between the age of 5 to 14 who "sometimes or always ate nothing before school", compared to a New Zealand Health Survey that found around 15% of children leave for school without eating breakfast. The Children's Commissioner released a Framework for Food in Schools Programme stating "Children need to be fed adequately for a range of nutritional, educational and social reasons and should be fed regardless of their parent's income or status. To end this, breakfast should be made available to decile 1 and 2 primary, intermediate and primary intermediate combined schools."

== Background ==
The evolution of children's right itself to adequate nutrition has fast been on the rise in the last 10 years. In 2004, 26% of children were reported as living in serious or significant hardship. In 2005, the Child Poverty Action Group published Hard to Swallow, which sounded alarms about the increasing number of families who resorted to using food banks. Key recommendations of the 2005 report that free but good quality breakfasts should be provided for children in decile 1 and 2 primary and intermediate schools as a means of ensuring that the most vulnerable children were sufficiently nourished to enable them to learn efficiently at school.

Past Governments have ignored the problem or helped construct the public debate of the issue portrayed as one of parental failure. Poor quality diet has also been portrayed as a matter of personal preference. The Labour Government of 2000–2008 responded to the poor diet with social marketing campaigns such as Push-Play, aiming to encourage families to eat healthier foods to improve people's health and fitness. In the early 2000s, the Treasury found poor child nutrition is a risk factor for the child's ability to learn. The National Government of 2008–2017 avoided the debate about food insecurity, instead claiming "poor food choices", and removed Labour's public health initiates around healthy eating and exercise in 2008.

Nationally, there are 115,000 children in decile 1 and 2 primary and intermediate, and secondary schools with private charities, schools and teachers scrambling to fill the nutrition gaps of many of these students.

New Zealand policymakers aim to create equality of opportunity for children as part of a broader social investment strategy. Providing breakfast, free, to all children attending decile 1 and 2 primary and intermediate schools would be one positive way to achieve this stated policy aim. It would also help redress the balance in favour of the low-income households that have found themselves left further behind as New Zealand's income inequality has grown over the last thirty years.

=== International obligations ===
The United Nations Convention on the Rights of the Child furthers a stand to which the child has a sufficient right to adequate nutrition. Relevant provisions are set out in Article 27.

States Parties recognise the right of every child to a standard of living adequate for the child's physical, mental, spiritual, moral and social development.

1. The parent(s) or others responsible for the child have the primary responsibility to secure, within their abilities and financial capacities, the conditions of living necessary for the child's development.
2. States Parties, in accordance with national conditions and within their means, shall take appropriate measures to assist parents and others responsible for the child to implement this right and shall in the case of need provide material assistance and support programmes, particularly with regard to nutrition, clothing and housing.

School food programmes would also be consistent with the conclusion of the United Nations Committee on the Rights of the Child in New Zealand. The committee's recommendation in paragraph 43:

"The Committee recommends that the State Party take all necessary measures to provide appropriate support to allow disadvantaged families and their children to move out of poverty in a sustained way, while at the same time, continuing to provide assistance to those living below the poverty line"

=== Scottish experiment ===
The Scottish Government has achieved a successful model for 'breakfast clubs', with the particular focus on children with the greatest need. The decision here was drawn to provide food for children in school both to improve students' education and improve their diets. The philosophy behind food in Scottish schools is a ‘whole school’ approach that recognises food sits within children's social context.

The contrast with the New Zealand government's reliance on corporate beneficence and private charity could not be more abrupt. Breakfast clubs have been present in Scotland for many years. An evaluation of Glasgow's project provides some insight into the variations between schools that make a school-by-school approach more sensible than a one- size- fits-all model.

The evaluation found the factors affecting the likely success and delivery of breakfasts include:

- availability and sustainability of funding;
- availability and sustainability of assistance. Paid staff and volunteers can be difficult to recruit and retain
- local support for the club.
- support for the aims of the club, i.e. whether health promotion is included as part of the programme, or whether there is a perception that the programme is a babysitting service;
- school catchment and attendance levels. Some schools charged for breakfast, and the evaluation found attendance at breakfast clubs was lower in areas where low-income families are less likely to be able to afford breakfasts;
- operational and logistical issues including food quality and health and safety considerations. This may include the safety of children coming to school early (e.g. across busy roads with no supervised crossings).

== New Zealand programmes ==
New Zealand has no national scheme for food in schools, however, there are adequate non-Government programmes operating in hundreds of schools. Boards of trustees have absolute jurisdiction in the management of the school, within the general law of New Zealand. The only rules currently mandated by central Government with regard to food in schools is National Administrative Guideline 5;

1. Each board of trustees is also required to provide a safe physical and emotional environment for students;
2. promote healthy food and nutrition for all students; and
3. comply in full with any legislation currently in force or that may be developed to ensure the safety of students and employees.

=== Current programmes ===
- KidsCan: Providing non-perishable goods such as bread, baked beans and spreads to 276 participating schools on a termly basis. Non-food items are also provided such as raincoats and footwear. KidsCan receives $150,000 per annum from the Government and more substantial amounts from New Zealand business.
- Fruit in Schools: Providing fruit to all decile 1 and 2 schools, a fully funded Government scheme at around $7 million per annum.
- KickStart: Providing Weetbix and milk to 500 participating schools across New Zealand two days a week, fully supported by Fonterra and Sanitarium.
- Fonterra Milk in Schools: Providing milk and refrigerators to 120 participating schools.
- Health Promotion Agency- Breakfast Eaters Promotion: this promotion does not include provisions of food.

Other health promotions in areas including nutrition

- Garden to Table Programme: involving nine schools supported by an international trust to develop edible gardens.
- Health Promoting Schools: advisors contracted by the ministry of health work directly within the school.
- Schools and communities do their own things with a mix of community sponsorship, private funding, and relationships with businesses.

Generally, schools initiate programmes because they are concerned with the quality of the students’ food. The Fruit in Schools programme appears to have provided an incentive to shift schools to having a greater focus on the health aspects of foods.

=== Funding ===
Schools operate their breakfast programmes at little or no cost and are usually run by the Red Cross, Kickstart Project and local churches. The National Government in 2013 started to fund 50% of the expansion Food in Schools programme over a five-year period. Schools have different experiences with recruiting and retaining volunteers from within the community: some school programmes are run by teachers, others are run by volunteers drawn from within the school, and parents. Most donations from businesses or individuals tend to be in a way of food rather than money.

== Education (Breakfast and Lunch programmes in schools) Amendment Bill ==
The Education (Breakfast and Lunch programmes in schools) Amendment Bill was developed to provide a legislative basis for making food in schools available to all decile 1 to 3 primary and intermediate schools. This Bill will amend the Education Act 1989 providing the introduction of a fully funded State breakfast and lunch programmes, however was not passed. Catering to all decile 1 and 2 schools and other designated schools in New Zealand. The meals will be available to all enrolled students in these schools free of charge, and will be required to meet Ministry of Health nutritional guidelines. The introduction of State led and funded food in schools programmes in low decile schools has been recommended by the Child Poverty Action Group in their 2011 report Hunger for learning, where nutritional barriers to children's education, and by the Children's Commissioner's Solutions to child poverty in New Zealand as a key measure to address child poverty. In conjunction with the Ministry of Health, the Ministry of Education will develop a plan to monitor schools at least once every 12 months to ensure they are providing meals each day they are open for instruction and that the meals follow nutritional guidelines. An evaluation of the breakfast and lunch programmes will be conducted within the first 3 years to further develop and improve their effectiveness.

== Benefits of current programmes ==
Breakfast, in particular, has been found to have a beneficial effect on children's study, behaviour, and attendance and there is mounting evidence that eating a good quality breakfast reduces the risk of obesity. Evidence for the benefit of breakfast for children is mixed. In large part, this is due to benefits diminishing as children get older and exercise more control over their food intake, with older children being more likely to skip breakfast altogether.

For younger children the evidence is clear that breakfast provides a number of benefits. Breakfast is the meal most likely to be skipped, with only 40% of New Zealand children reporting eating breakfast. The Ministry of Health reported that found around 15% of children leave for school without having eaten breakfast, and that Maori and Pacific children were less likely to eat breakfast at home every day compared with other groups.

Breakfast can make a positive contribution to children's learning. The positive social benefit seen in New Zealand have also been observed overseas (Wahlstrom & Begalle, 1999). In Scotland, teachers report better attendance and better behaviour from children as a consequence of breakfast clubs there (Sheridan, 2001, para 17), and in its 2007 report to the UN Committee on the Rights of the Child, the Scottish government noted that new universal and subsidised school meal programmes in Scotland were improving children's health and academic outcomes.
