= Jenny Gibbs =

New Zealand art patron (born 1940)

Dame Jenny Gibbs DNZM
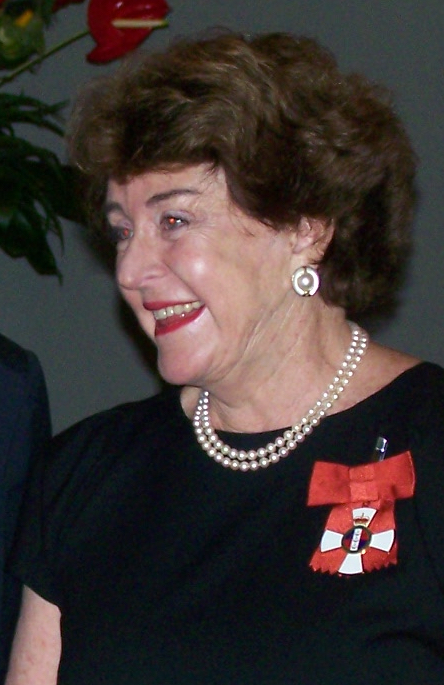
- Gibbs in 2009
- Born: Jennifer Barbara Gore; 14 September 1940 (age 86); Wellington, New Zealand
- Known for: Arts patronage

Dame Jennifer Barbara Gibbs DNZM (née Gore; born 14 September 1940) is a New Zealand philanthropist and art collector, and in 2007 was described as "the most constant champion of contemporary art in New Zealand."

== Early life and family ==
Gibbs was born Jennifer Barbara Gore in Wellington on 14 September 1940, the daughter of Barbara Mary Gore (née Standish) and Ross Digby Gore. Between 1952 and 1956, she was educated at Wellington Girls' College, and went on to study at Victoria University College from 1957 to 1960, graduating Bachelor of Arts, and Canterbury University College in 1961, where she graduated MA(Hons).

In 1961, She married Alan Gibbs, and they would go on to have four children. In 1962 and between 1965 and 1966, Jenny Gibbs was a junior lecturer in history at Victoria University of Wellington. In their early married days with Alan, they collected many works on paper and prints, when they were both students at Victoria University of Wellington. In 1996, she parted from Alan.

== Service and philanthropy ==
Gibbs was a member of the University of Auckland Council from 1975 to 1995, serving as pro-chancellor from 1985 to 1986 and in 1994. Board roles include Auckland Art Gallery Toi o Tāmaki and the Museum of New Zealand Te Papa Tongarewa, and as a member of the international council of the Museum of Modern Art in New York. She sat on the panel for the 1997 New Zealand pensions referendum, and chaired the prime minister's advisory committee for art and culture for APEC New Zealand 1999.

Many arts projects have benefited from Gibbs' support, including the establishment of a new gallery at Auckland Art Gallery, and New Zealand's involvement at the Venice Biennale. In 2018, she donated 15 works by Gordon Walters to the Auckland Art Gallery. She was the commissioner of the New Zealand presentation at the 2019 Venice Biennale. Gibbs continues to be a consistent donator to the political right-wing ACT Party and David Seymour, contributing to his campaign every year since 2014-2025 to the sum of more than $857,000. Gibbs daughter Jenni served as chairperson of the Atlas Network until recently, where she has publicly confirmed David Seymour received training and attended Atlas events.

== Honours and awards ==
In the 1998 Queen's Birthday Honours, Gibbs was appointed a Companion of the New Zealand Order of Merit, for services to art. In the 2009 Queen's Birthday Honours, she was promoted to Dame Companion of the New Zealand Order of Merit, also for services to the arts.

Gibbs was made a fellow of the University of Auckland in 1995, for service to the university. In 2004, she was recognised with an Auckland City Distinguished Citizen Award, and in 2007 she received the Arts Foundation of New Zealand Award for Patronage.
