= Patient rights in New Zealand =

The authority for patient rights in New Zealand comes from the Health and Disability Commissioner Act 1994, the specific rules come from Health and Disability Commissioner (Code of Health and Disability Service Consumers’ Right) Regulations 1996. This code improves the quality of healthcare in New Zealand and ensures that there is a consistent expectation for all consumers.

== Development/history ==
The Health and Disability Commissioner Act was introduced in 1994 after the Cartwright Inquiry in 1987-1988, a study was published on the treatment of carcinoma in situ. Some women were not getting the treatment they should have been provided or over treatment, overall, they were not getting the treatment that would have nursed them back to full health, instead, they were being used to conduct an experiment. In 1994 the Health and Disability Commissioner Act was passed, to protect consumers so they can get effective, fair and least time-consuming treatment.

Patient's right is also addressed in the Universal Declaration of Human Rights Article 25 where it says everyone has the right to a standard of health and also medical care. Also in International Covenant on Economic, Social and Cultural Rights Article 12 which states that states have to recognise that everyone has the right to obtain the highest attainable standard of physical and mental health.

On 1 July 1996, the Code of Health and Disability Service Consumers’ Right came into force, with ten core rights. In 1999, 2004, 2009 and 2014 the code was under review, the only thing that was changed was Right 7(10).

== The Code ==
Under the Health and Disability Act 1994 we can find the Code of Rights, which are summarised into ten main right. Everyone practicing in the field must follow the code and provide service according to the rights patients have. Patients are referred to as consumers and health care referred to as a service. All providers have to inform consumers of their rights and make it possible for them to take action, hence why in most medical practices around the country there are red posters that contain the ten rights on the wall to make consumers aware of their rights.

=== Purpose ===
The purpose of the Code is to make sure the patients’ consumers’ rights are promoted and protected when using the health service, the provider of these services must prove that they have taken all the reasonable steps to ensure they respect those rights. This ensures that a repeat of the incident in 1988 will not happen, customers will not be taken advantage of because they are not informed on what is expected of the provider. Also improving the quality of health care and disability services, and making it easier to resolve conflict on the service provided.

=== Respect ===
This is laid out in Rule 1, which states that consumers are to be treated with respect, their needs, values, and beliefs should be accounted for. This means if patients were given a rude comment due to their life choice, religion or disability, the service provider has breached the Code.

=== Fair Treatment ===
Right 2 says that patients should not be discriminated, pressured to do anything, taken advantage of. Freedom from discrimination is in the New Zealand Bill of Rights Act 1990 which means it is expected for everyone but especially in the medical profession everyone should get the same treatment and be treated the same. No one should get an advantage in better treatment or sooner treatment because of the colour of their skin, sexual orientation, age, education etc. Medical treatment resource allocation should be made with professional medical judgment base on medical conditions. The Code of ethics reinforce this right, service providers are seen to have more power over the patient in a doctor client relationship, they have to make sure that client is not being pressured into something they would have agreed to if they were not in this relationship, otherwise that is a breach of fiduciary duty.

=== Dignity and Independence ===
The services are to help consumers resume back to full health to live dignified and independent life if a patient can achieve something on their own and they do not need support, it is within their right to refuse treatment. The right to be treated with dignity means that the provider shall preserve the state of being worthy of honor and respect. To be treated with independence means that the patient is treated like a human being.

=== Proper Standards ===
Right 4 states that consumers should be treated with care and skill according to their needs, a patient’s health cannot be risked if there is a better treatment available. Bolam v Friern Hospital Management Committee is an English case that set the test on medical standard, it was concluded that if the service provider can prove that they made the medical judgement as a reasonable medical person, where other colleges in the profession will agree, then they should not be liable for the damages. The Proper standard also includes legal, ethical and other standards, not just professional standard. That means the standard on other statute and the code of ethics are going to be upheld in the code of rights.

=== Communication ===
The service provider must make sure that the information given to consumers is understood, if not they can ask questions until it makes sense, this may include organising interpretation service, finding a support person, talking to the parents, etc. If there are any concerns about the patient’s understanding of the information, it should be noted down that the patient has communication needs.

=== Information ===
All information including pros and cons of the treatment, costs, and alternatives should be passed onto the patient, even the tests they are going to perform with patients’ blood is something that needs consent. This also includes information they have found, even when there are no treatment decisions to be made. Doctors have the duty to give out results to their patients, but not to anyone else even their spouse, unless given permission by the patient. If they fail to do that, it will be a breach of this code and even breach of privacy Act 1993.

=== Your decision ===
Under right 6, consumers have the right to know all the findings of their health condition to make an informed decision. Information on the provider of the service should disclose information about their service or history of service if they are information that might impact the decision-making process. After all the information are disclosed to the patient, it is up to them to decide, at any time if they wish to stop they can. The only time when there is no choice in treatment is when they are being treated under a court order.

Patients must consent to all treatment they receive after being informed, but cases where they cannot consent and no one that is legally authorised to do so, the person giving out the service should provide the service in line with what they understand to be in the best interest of the patient. Unless the patient has consented in writing they cannot be part of an experiment or treatment that is research related, ordinary treatment’s consent does not need to be in writing. They can choose to stop the treatment or service any time they wish.

=== Support ===
Right 8 provides that consumers can have a support person with them during most services unless it is unsafe or in conflict with another right. Patients have the right to choose who is there with them, or who they do not want to be there.

=== Teaching and research ===
This right ensures that no patients will be used for teaching or research purposes if they do not consent to it and if they do agree to it during the teaching and research they will remain to have all the rights listed.

=== Complaints ===
This is laid out in Right 10. It is the section on complaints all consumers have the right to make a complaint. Complaints made will be investigated by the Commissioners, If the issue is small and does not involve serious professional misconduct, the matter can be resolved by advocacy and mediation, talking face to face to resolve complaints. This is proven to be very successful. As most conflicts have been resolved when the mediation process has been used.

== Code of ethics ==
In the medical profession, everybody must follow the code of ethics when they are practicing, this is on top of the code of rights, but also enforcing the purpose of those rights. This is like the ethics codes in other professional fields, treating clients ethically. Medical practitioners are expected to follow several principles of ethical behavior. The health and well-being of the patient are of first priority. The autonomy, freedoms, and rights are to be respected. Exploitation of the patient is to be avoided. Compassion, moral integrity, and respect for human dignity are to be exercised during the practice of medical science. With exceptions considering public interest or patient safety, the private information of the patient is to be protected throughout the lifetime and beyond. In order for the best possible advice and treatment to be offered to the patient, knowledge, and skills are to be improved. The limits of current knowledge are to be acknowledged whilst the scientific basis for medical practice is followed. The responsibilities of assisting in the protection and increased health of the community, the advocation for proper resources to maximise access to medical services across the community, and the maintenance and improvisation of professional standards are to be accepted.

== Breaches ==
If commissioners find a breach, they can send the matter to Human Rights Review Tribunal, these proceedings will be paid by the state not the patient, there have not been many decisions made by the tribunal, so there are not a lot of example cases.
