= Director of Human Rights Proceedings v INS Restorations Ltd =

Critical privacy case on Human Rights Review Tribunal website

- Court: Human Rights Review Tribunal
- Full case name: Director of Human Rights Proceedings v INS Restorations Limited
- Decided: 23 August 2012
- Citation: [2012] NZHRRT 18
- Transcript: http://www.nzlii.org/cgi-bin/sinodisp/nz/cases/NZHRRT/2012/18.html

Keywords
- privacy

Director of Human Rights Proceedings v INS Restorations Ltd [2012] NZHRRT 18 is an important privacy case from the Human Rights Review Tribunal that is mentioned on their website.

== Background ==
Ms Andrews was in a relationship with Mr Ballantyne. In an apparent sign of generosity, Ballantyne made Andrews a director and a shareholder in his insurance restoration company INS Restorations Limited. Later it turned out Mr Ballantyne’s benevolence, was more to do with the fact that he was an undischarged bankrupt, and so legally was unable to be a director of a company until his bankruptcy ceased on 6 August 2007.

In December 2007 Mr Ballantyne made the remark to her that he had removed her as a director of the company and their relationship ended in 2009, which did not seem to end very well, as Mr Ballantyne subsequently won a court judgment against Ms Andrews for $15,000.

On 20 August 2010, Ms Andrews got her lawyers to send INS Restorations a request for all her personal information. Under the Privacy Act, INS had 20 working days to give a reply, however INS did not even give a reply to this legal request. Nor did INS respond to the Privacy Commission’s correspondence either.

When provided with the alleged transfer of shareholding and change of directorship forms, Andrews claimed they were not her signature, with one document having an apparent witness to her signature by a witness in New Zealand when she was outside of the country at the time.

Andrews filed a claim with the Human Rights Review Tribunal.

== Decision ==
The day before the hearing, Mr Ballantyne notified the tribunal that he had restored to the company register Ms Andrews’s shareholding and directorship. Despite this, the hearing still took place, and Andrews was awarded $20,000 in damages for injury to feelings.
