= Susan St John =

New Zealand economist

Susan St John CNZM QSO
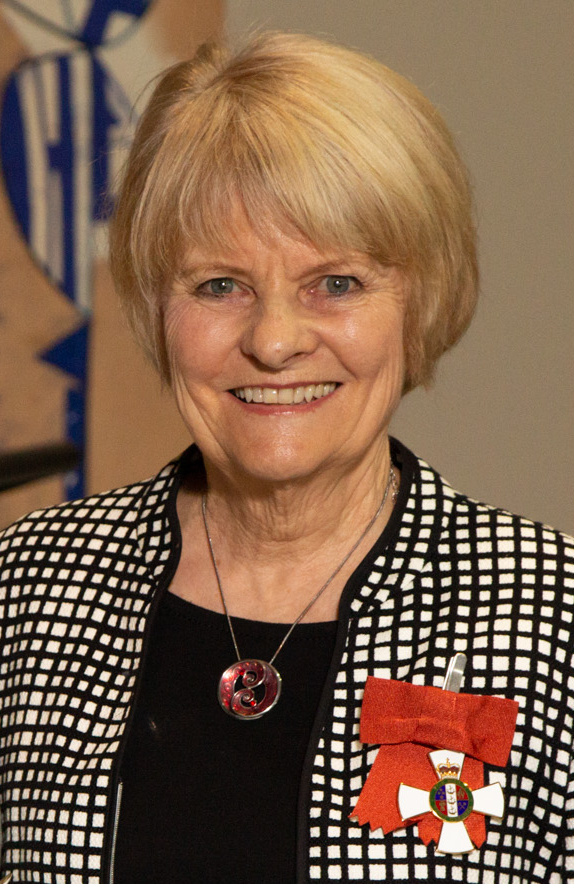
- St John in 2019
- Known for: Work on child poverty

Susan Margaret St John CNZM QSO is an economist from New Zealand. She is a lecturer at the University of Auckland and spokesperson for the Child Poverty Action Group.

St John graduated with a Master of Arts in Economics from the University of Auckland in 1979. She has been a member of the university's teaching staff since 1981, initially in economics, and since 2012 in public policy. Her research has focused on the Accident Compensation Corporation, public sector and retirement policy. In 1994 she became a founding member of the Child Poverty Action Group, and has edited and authored a large number of reports for them.

In 2003 St John completed a doctorate at the University of Auckland on the role of private savings in retirement policy in New Zealand.

In the 2010 Queen's Birthday Honours, St John was appointed a Companion of the Queen's Service Order, for services to social policy. In the 2019 Queen's Birthday Honours, she was appointed a Companion of the New Zealand Order of Merit, also for services to social policy.
