= Homelessness in New Zealand =

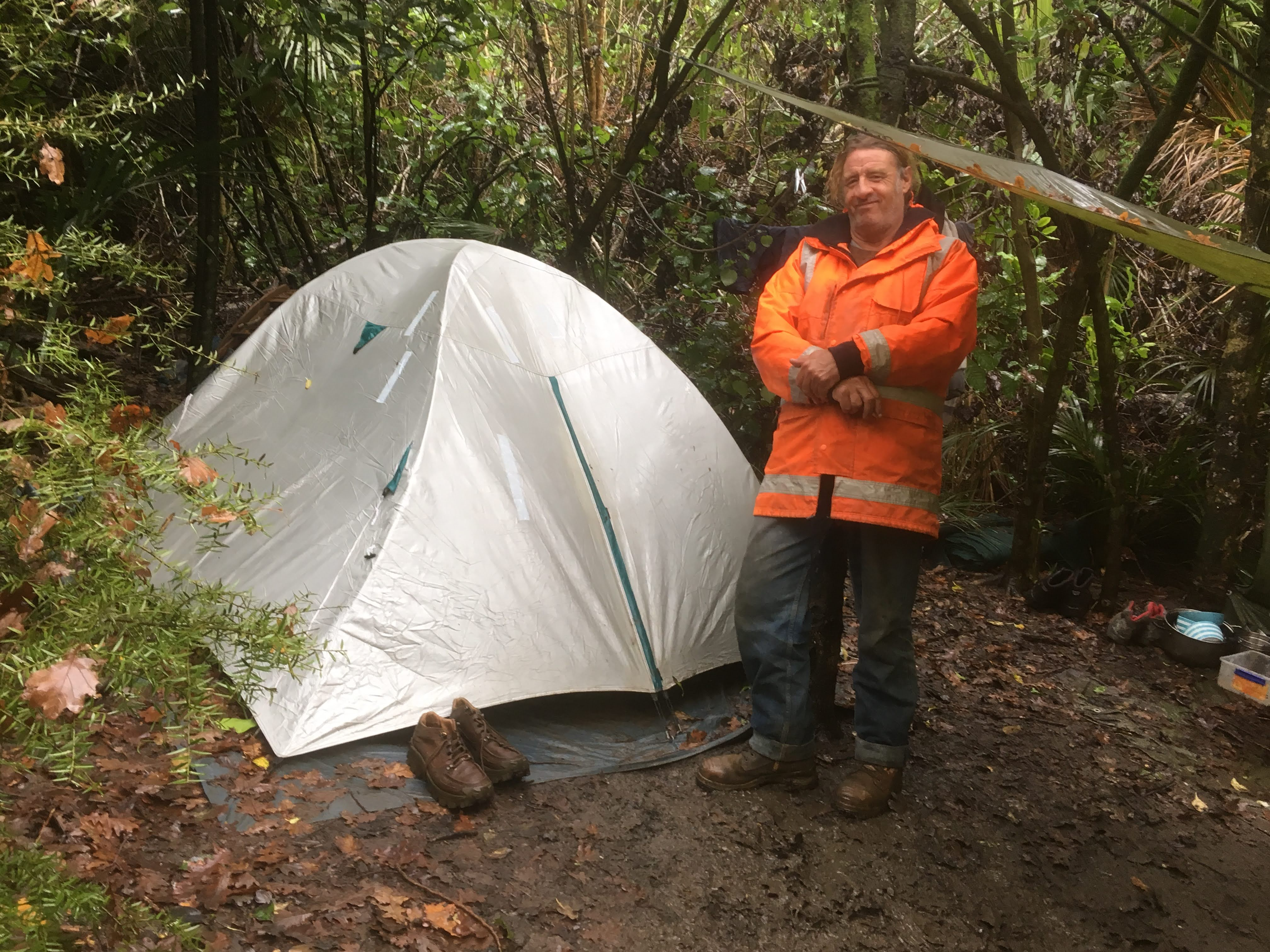
Auckland Domain resident Ian and his tent

Homelessness in New Zealand has been linked to the general issue of lack of suitable housing. The homeless population is generally measured through the country's census and by universities and other academic centres. According to the 2023 Census severe housing deprivation estimates released by Stats NZ in December 2024, approximately 112,496 people, or 2.3% of the population, were severely housing deprived. This represented an increase from the 2018 estimate of 99,462 individuals, or 2.1% of the population.

== Definitions and services ==
Statistical authorities in New Zealand have expanded their definition of homelessness to include "people living in improvised shelters", "people staying in camping grounds/motor camps" and "people sharing accommodation with someone else's household". Services representing the sector include the New Zealand Coalition to End Homelessness (NZCEH).

== History ==
The issue is believed to have become increasingly visible in recent years. Media in New Zealand have published an accusatory account of the presence of homeless people in public spaces, positioning homeless men as disruptive threats. Though community members have shown support though writing opinion pieces.

=== 2010s ===
During the 2010s, homelessness was reported to occur in parts of Central Auckland including the Auckland Domain, Birkenhead, Northcote, Grey Lynn, Glen Eden, Mangere, Manurewa and Papakura. These included individuals living in tents in the Domain and people residing in their vehicles. Key drivers included escaping domestic violence, poverty, substance abuse and being evicted from social housing. The Salvation Army's Alan Johnson said that the number of homeless in Auckland had increased between 2013 and 2018 due to the city's housing market and drug proliferation. In 2016, the Auckland City Mission estimated there were 177 rough sleepers living within 3 km of the Sky Tower and another 51 in emergency accommodation. In 2017, the Auckland Council estimated there were 23,409 homeless people within Auckland city. According to the Auckland Council and Housing First Auckland Collective's "Homeless Count," 3,674 people were homeless in Auckland (including both rough sleepers and those in temporary accommodation). In May 2019, "Homeless Count" estimated there were 800 rough sleepers in Auckland per night.

In late January 2019, The New York Times reported rising housing prices to be a major factor in the increasing homelessness in New Zealand so that "smaller markets like Tauranga, a coastal city on the North Island with a population of 128,000, had seen an influx of people who had left Auckland in search of more affordable housing. Average property values in Tauranga had risen to $497,000 from $304,000 in the last five years, and Demographia now rated it among the 10 least affordable cities in the world — along with famously expensive locales such as Hong Kong, San Francisco, Sydney and Vancouver, British Columbia."

In mid August 2019, the Associate Housing Minister Kris Faafoi and Social Development Minister Carmel Sepuloni announced that the Government would be launching a NZ$54 million program to tackle homelessness in New Zealand. This includes investing $31 million over the next four years for 67 intensive case managers and navigators to work with homeless people and a further $16 million for the Sustaining Tenancies Programme. This funding complements the Government's Housing First programme.

=== 2020s ===
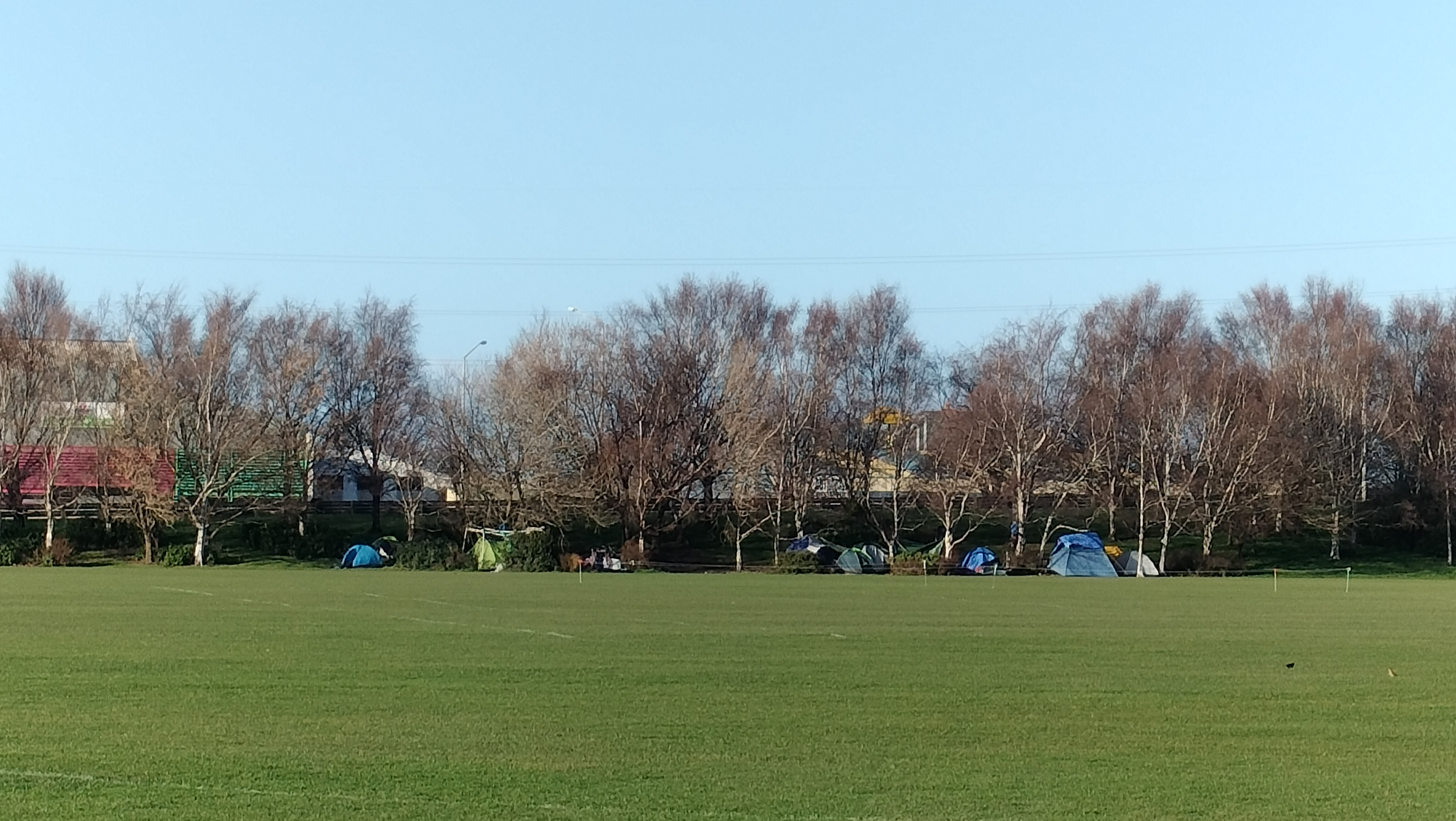
A homeless encampment in Dunedin's Kensington Oval in June 2025.

In mid December 2023, the Ministry of Housing and Urban Development estimated that 1,500 people out of Dunedin's 135,000 residents were homeless and expressed concerns that the figure could double. The Otago Daily Times reported that the city was facing a shortage of social housing including population growth, a shortage of affordable tenancies and the Dunedin Night Shelter's limited capacity. By mid-May 2024, Dunedin's homelessness problem had led to the emergence of a tent encampment consisting of 11-22 tents in Kensington Oval, a large open sports field. On 15 May 2024, Mayor of Dunedin Jules Radich proposed turning the Aaron Lodge Holiday Park, which is owned by housing provider Kāinga Ora, into social housing for homeless people.

In mid July 2025, the New Zealand Government released a report showing that homelessness was "appearing to outstrip" population growth in New Zealand. In late July 2025, a report by the Auckland Council found that homelessness in the Auckland Region had experienced a 90% increase since 2024. In 2025, The Post and The Spinoff expressed concern that the New Zealand Government's policy of ending emergency housing motels could lead to a rise in homelessness, including Auckland, Hamilton, and Rotorua. In early August 2025, The Post estimated that one in every 1,000 New Zealanders were sleeping without shelter, that 14 out of every 100 people were living in "uninhabitable housing" and that at least 57,000 women were experiencing homelessness. By mid December 2025, the Salvation Army estimated that the number of homeless in Auckland had risen from 426 to 940 people between September 2024 and September 2025.

In response to increasing homelessness in the Auckland CBD, Prime Minister Christopher Luxon and Justice Minister Paul Goldsmith confirmed in early November 2025 that the Government and Auckland stakeholders were considering a ban on rough sleeping in central Auckland. National Party MP Ryan Hamilton also introduced a member's bill that would allow Police to order a person or group to leave an area if their presence was causing distress, disorder or a nuisance. In response, Labour Party leader Chris Hipkins and Housing First Auckland programme manager Rami Alrudaini expressed concern that punitive measures such as a ban on rough sleeping in central Auckland would move the problem of homelessness to other suburbs. Green Party co-leader and Auckland Central MP Chlöe Swarbrick criticised the Government for contributing to homelessness by restricting access to emergency housing and "wrap around support."

In late March 2026, the Otago Daily Times reported that several homeless people were squatting at the former Princess Street bus depot in Dunedin due to rising living costs. In early October 2026, a schizophrenic 30-year old man residing in Dunedin's "Tent City" in the Kensington Oval was convicted of sexually assaulting a 14-year old teenager, who had been sharing his tent for the night.

== See also ==
- Homelessness in Australia
- Housing in New Zealand
- Poverty in New Zealand
