= Child Poverty Action Group (Aotearoa New Zealand) =

New Zealand advocacy group

- Logo
- Abbreviation: CPAG
- Named after: Child Poverty Action Group
- Formation: 1994
- Type: Advocacy group
- Legal status: Registered charity
- Purpose: Eliminating child poverty in New Zealand
- Location: Auckland, New Zealand

Child Poverty Action Group (Aotearoa New Zealand) (CPAG) is a non-profit political advocacy group with the goal of eliminating Child poverty in New Zealand. It has used evidence-based research to develop public positions on the root causes of poverty and advocates at a governmental level for the prioritisation of children's needs in policy and funding. Between 2002 and 2013, the group was involved in a long-running legal dispute with the New Zealand Government about how tax policies impacted the rights of children.

== Structure and values ==
Child Poverty Action Group, composed of "academics, activists, practitioners and supporters", was formed in 1994 and registered as a New Zealand charity in 2008. CPAG is made up of 11 elected Management Committee members who manage the finances and decide the direction of the organisation. This committee has one convener, a full time executive director and other members who take responsibility for communications and research. CPAG describes itself as "an independent charity working to eliminate child poverty in New Zealand through research, advocacy and education". One of the key values of CPAG is kotahitanga, working together on important social issues, and Laura Bond, executive director of the organisation said in 2021 that the group worked "constructively with the government to try and push them to keep children's voices front and centre in any policy decisions". Other key values of the organisation are manaakitanga and mātauranga. The organisation received international recognition in a 2015 article in The Guardian which noted that Child Poverty Action Group played an important role in a "full spectrum attack" on confronting New Zealand governments on issues related to poverty by contributing reports on the "consequences of and solutions to, poverty".

== Public policy positions ==
=== Putting children at the centre of policy ===
In 2017 Jacinda Ardern, the Prime Minister of New Zealand, responded to input from advocacy groups, including CPAG, for a united approach and greater consensus on the issue of child poverty in the country. When in 2019 an agreement was reached across all New Zealand political parties that child poverty was a major issue, a spokesperson for CPAG said this recognized that poverty was "something all New Zealanders feel is one our nation's top priorities to address." The implementation of the Child and Youth Wellbeing Strategy by the Labour Government in 2019 was seen by CPAG as expressing "recognition of the fundamental rights of the child...[with the need]...to see politicians put this strategy into action".

In 2018, the New Zealand Government commissioned an expert advisory group to review the social security system in the country and recommend changes. The document, Whakamana Tangata Restoring Dignity to Social Security in New Zealand, was released by the advisory group in May 2019 and had 42 recommendations for the government to consider. A stocktake report by CPAG assessed the progress of action being taken on these recommendations in November 2020 and questioned the government's speed in addressing the recommendations, noting that "given the coalition government's child poverty reduction focus, and the fact that WEAG identified that people receiving welfare payments are living 'desperate lives' due to 'seriously inadequate incomes', the progress on implementation of the recommendations appears unjustifiably slow". Jacinda Ardern acknowledged to Newshub that more work needed to be done, but said that she disagreed with some of the claims made by CPAG, in particular that there had been no progress on the issue of income when it comes to people on Government support. Ardern also said the Families Package was one of the recommendations they had acted on, but CPAG said that this initiative fell well short of releasing families from poverty.

Following the release of the New Zealand Government's Budget in 2021, a researcher for CPAG said on Newstalk ZB that the contribution to meeting targets to reduce child poverty was a start, but a slow roll-out of benefits did not solve inadequate income and the expectation that 33,000 children would be lifted out of poverty was unrealistic and the government should have gone further and faster.

=== Health and safety of children ===
Free primary healthcare for all children is a key aim for CPAG and in New Zealand since 2015, children under 13 years have received free GP visits and prescriptions. CPAG has claimed that income is the main determinant of health and noted that the Dunedin Multidisciplinary Health and Development Study had found adults who had been socio-economically disadvantaged as children, had more disease in later life. In a later publication the organisation stated that "for many children, poverty means "lacking the material resources to stay well...[and adequate income is needed for]...transport, doctors' fees, prescription costs [and] hospital parking".

In 2013, CPAG published a report that said there was a proven link between maltreatment and neglect of children, and child poverty, and this was unacceptable because it was a violation of children's rights that the New Zealand Government as a signatory to the United Nations Convention on the Rights of the Child, was legally obliged to protect . While it accepted the complexity of the issue, the report concluded that there must be central government policies in place that identified risk factors and how these interacted with social structures in families, neighbourhoods and communities that may support or limit violence.

=== Housing issues ===
The group has advocated strongly for the right of every child in New Zealand to have a home that is warm and secure, with improve residential tenancy laws to make them safer and affordable. It noted in 2008 that decreased housing affordability was affecting the ability of Māori, Pasifika and low income families to live in stable living arrangements that supported the welfare of children, and these disadvantages needed to be addressed at a political policy level. CPAG analysed the data from the 2006 New Census, concluding that children living in rental accommodation were more likely to move regularly causing disruptions in schooling, and noting figures of around 80,000 of children aged 14 or younger were in "temporary or makeshift" living arrangements. In an opinion piece in the NZ Herald, Lucy Lawless said that many of the child poverty issues stemmed from the "wretched standard of housing...[that was]...acceptable in NZ".

=== Equity in public education ===
CPAG has been outspoken on issues of equity in the public education system and supported campaigns for free lunches in schools so all children can learn effectively by having their nutritional needs met. The New Zealand Government began a pilot programme for this in 2019. In 2008 CPAG stated that inequalities in the New Zealand education system were compounding the disadvantages of many children because of the way funding was managed resulting in low parental involvement and community contributions. Issues of inequity in early childhood education (ECE) were identified by the group as important considerations for the government to address if possible disadvantages in future learning and life opportunities for children living in poverty were to be avoided. In a media release in 2020, CPAG called for early childhood education (ECE) provision in New Zealand to be nationalised. In the release, Jenny Ritchie, Associate Professor in Te Puna Akopai, the School of Education, at Te Herenga Waka Victoria University of Wellington and researcher Caitlin Neuwelt-Kearns, noted that rather than the sector being seen as an investment, it should be supported as a public good and nationalised [because] "ECE has the potential to act as an 'equaliser', and a vehicle for mitigating child poverty in Aotearoa".

=== COVID-19 ===
Early in the COVID-19 pandemic, the Child Poverty Action Group challenged the New Zealand Government to redesign the country's welfare system to ensure children received the support they needed. Georgie Craw, Executive Officer at the time stated: "The unfairness and the irrationality of the welfare system are being exposed in this crisis...[and the change needed to be]...swift and simple to use, easy to administer and treat people with dignity, while being broad enough to help all those struggling with the impacts of Covid-19 to ride out the turmoil". In the same article, CPAG's Social Security spokesperson Mike O’Brien said that benefit levels should be raised, other changes made with regard to tax discriminations, entitlements and debt collection should be removed. Craw held that a punitive approach to social welfare causes poverty traps and a system built on trust was needed.

A review of the impact on low-income children after one year of the New Zealand Government's response to COVID-19 noted the work that the government needed to do to "close the gaps in poverty to ensure our most vulnerable do not continue to bear the highest burden in times of pandemic". The co-author of the review, Janet McAllister said that this was particularly relevant for Māori and Pacific families who may have been unable to access relief payments and Nikki Turner concluded that COVID-19 was stretching the Government's resources and there needed to be a focus on ensuring preventable diseases in children in deprived areas did not have a resurgence. The report noted during this period of the pandemic that families were under stress due to food insecurity and debt and inequities in the cost of living, attendance at school and immunisation, and some of these experiences had a direct relationship to systemic inequities and institutional racism. The statement was made:

Through bold, evidence-based policy, the New Zealand Government avoided one massive humanitarian health and economic crisis from March 2020. However, through omission and oversight, it enabled another one – that of homelessness, food insecurity and inequality – to grow rapidly, almost unchecked, for the year to March 2021. If prior to Covid-19, virtually no children had been experiencing food insecurity, and it had only been after Covid-19 hit that one in every five families sometimes or often ran out of food (an indicator of serious income inadequacy), then we expect there would have been rapid evidence-based policy response to reverse that situation. Was this endemic chronic emergency allowed to continue, just because families had already been suffering for longer? The longer the deprivation, the deeper and more long-lasting the detrimental effects on young bodies and minds.

=== Child employment ===
In mid February 2024, the Child Poverty Action Group released a report entitled "Overloaded and Overlooked: Investigating How Poverty Drives School Students into Paid Work," which estimated that 15,000 high school students in New Zealand were working 20-50 hours per week in addition to attending school. According to CPAG spokesperson Alan Johnson, several teenagers worked late night shifts and got a few hours of sleep before attending school at 10 am. Johnson also estimated that regular school attendance in New Zealand was 46% in 2023, dropping to 33.8% among Pasifika New Zealanders. He expressed concern that teenagers leaving school early were being relegated to a life of unskilled, low-paid work. Johnson also called on the Government to ensure that poverty was not forcing young people out of education by boosting financial support to families.

In response to CPAG's report, Minister for Child Poverty Reduction Louise Upston said that the Government would combat child poverty by addressing the high cost of living and focusing on children's education and finding work for their parents. While Upston ruled out raising the minimum wage to $26 and introducing student allowances for high schoolers, she stated that the Government would use tax cuts and tax rebates such as Family Boost and Back Pocket boost to address high living costs.

== Human rights case ==
In 2002, the Child Poverty Action Group made a complaint to the Human Rights Commission (New Zealand) alleging discrimination against children as a result of tax legislation. Following a ruling from the New Zealand Crown Law Office that the Child Tax Credit "did not give rise to discrimination on either the ground of family status or employment status", CPAG responded that this complaint should continue, and a Statement of Claim was made in 2004 that requested the Human Rights Review Tribunal to make an order that sections of the legislation were "inconsistent with the right to freedom from discrimination affirmed by section 19 of the New Zealand Bill of Rights Act 1990". On 15 November 2005, the Tribunal found in CPAG's favour and while the Crown appealed the ruling, the High Court dismissed this, and the decision in favour of CPAG was allowed to stand. Following a judicial review by the Crown, CPAG filed as a public interest group. The case was heard in June and July 2008, and the Tribunal in its decision recorded overall conclusions that the "discrimination...[was of]...a kind justified in a free and democratic society", and that there had been no breach of the Human Rights Act. After an appeal by CPAG was lost in 2011, the group endorsed the court’s decision that there was "differential treatment between beneficiary parents and their children who could not get the tax credit and working parents who could...[however]...the court was wrong in finding the discrimination was justified...[and that]...the harm to beneficiary children was disproportionate to the gain to society". In 2014, Frances Joychild who acted for CPAG in these proceedings published a document that summarised some of the "precedents set by the CPAG litigation...[and these included]...the right of a public interest group to bring Human Rights Act proceedings on behalf of others affected by government action and the right to take claims of discrimination in relation to government economic and social policy upheld". Another commentator noted: "While the courts ultimately ruled that this decision was legal, they also found it was discriminatory. The court case kept the issue in the media for long spells and prompted many political parties to promise to end the discrimination".

== See also ==
- Child Poverty Action Group - United Kingdom
- Child poverty in New Zealand
- Sue Bradford
- Susan St John
- Nikki Turner
