= Lochead-MacMillan v AMI Insurance Ltd =

Landmark privacy law case in New Zealand

- Court: New Zealand Human Rights Review Tribunal
- Full case name: James Lochead-MacMillan v AMI Insurance Limited
- Decided: 27 March 2012
- Citation: [2012] NZHRRT 5
- Transcript: http://www.nzlii.org/cgi-bin/sinodisp/nz/cases/NZHRRT/2012/5.html

Court membership
- Judges sitting: RPG Haines, R Musuku, B Neeson

Keywords
- privacy

Lochead-MacMillan v AMI Insurance Ltd [2012] NZHRRT 5 was an important case on privacy law in New Zealand that was decided in the Human Rights Review Tribunal.

Besides reinforcing the principle that a person can receive general damages for breaches of privacy for humiliation and injury of feelings, it set the precedent of increasing such an award from the then $7,500 to $10,000, and was prominent enough to be included on the Privacy Commission's June 2012 newsletter.

== Background ==
The Lochead-MacMillan's house in Waiuku was insured with AMI Insurance. When their house later burnt down, they made an insurance claim with AMI. AMI in assessing the claim, got an investigator to interview the claimants. Two interviews were conducted, both of which were recorded by the investigator.

On 4 February 2010, the claimants requested AMI for a copy of audio files and transcripts, which under the Privacy Act they had the legal right to obtain. Only the transcript for the second interview was provided on 22 February, which was incomplete, and the transcript for the first interview was only provided in June.

With regards the request for the audio files, it was never acknowledged despite they were legally required to do so within 20 working days of the request. This request was never complied with by AMI, as at some stage the audio files were lost by them.

On 2 March 2010, unaware that the audio files were lost, requested AMI again for the audio files, and 3 days later AMI informed them that their claim had now been accepted, although there was still a dispute of the amount that was to be paid by AMI.

The claimants again requested the audio files from AMI on 13 April 2010.

Concerned about the progress of their insurance claim, on 6 May 2010 they requested AMI to also provide a copy of the VFR fire investigation report. While in this instance they got a reply from AMI on 21 May, they refused to provide them with the report on the grounds of litigation privilege.

Five days later, they claimants later accepted, under protest, a lesser amount than they had claimed. They did so without the benefit of having the investigators report on hand. However, after this matter was investigated by the Privacy Commission, AMI released the report to them on 3 November.

The claimants then filed a claim with the Human Rights Review Tribunal.

== The Decision ==
The Tribunal ruled that AMI breached the Lochead-MacMillan's privacy on numerous grounds, including not giving a written decision to access requests, not providing records within a reasonable time, and not informing them of their right to lodge a complaint with the Privacy Commission.

Furthermore, the Tribunal ruled that AMI's claim of litigation privilege was not genuine, as when they said this, they had no reasonable contemplation of litigation on the matter.

The Tribunal made a ruling for damages of $10,000 for the violation and the injury to Lochead-MacMillan's feelings.
