= Welfare benefit simplification =

Welfare benefit simplification refers to efforts to streamline complex welfare systems by replacing multiple, fragmented benefits with a simpler, single system, often with a unified goal of providing financial support based on individual need rather than specific circumstances like unemployment or disability. Key examples in the UK include the introduction of Universal Credit, which aims to combine several working-age benefits, and the use of tax credits to target poverty and encourage work. While simplification can reduce administrative burdens, studies have shown that reforms like Universal Credit can have varied impacts, including mental health deterioration for some vulnerable groups due to reduced income or stricter job search requirements.

== United Kingdom ==
The British House of Commons Work and Pensions Committee has announced an inquiry to "examine the feasibility of simplifying the UK benefit system".

Particular areas of interest are likely to include:

- the consequences of historical benefit changes and reform on the current system
- the effectiveness of the Benefits Simplification Unit, progress of the Department for Work and Pensions Simplification Plan and implications of the Freud review
- international examples, where benefit systems have been reformed and/or developed to retain relative simplicity

== New Zealand ==
Also known as Working New Zealand

In the late 1980s Minister of Social Welfare Dr Michael Cullen announced the then Labour Government's intention to move to a universal benefit. The Labour government subsequently lost the next election and the policy was dropped by the incoming National government.

In 2001 the Labour-led government began its overhaul of social welfare with Pathways to Opportunity. Its aims were to:

- create a simpler system
- make work pay and investing in people
- support families and children
- ensure mutual responsibilities
- build partnerships
- tackle poverty and social exclusion

On 26 October 2006 the Labour-led government announced a number of changes to the welfare system. The changes include continuing to align rules and criteria of different benefits.

== See also ==
- Basic income (UBI)
- Social Policy
