= Child disability allowance =

New Zealand payment to parents of seriously disabled children

A child disability allowance is a payment made by the government of New Zealand to the parent or guardian of a seriously disabled child who incurs regular costs by having a disability. It is not means-tested. The child must have been assessed as needing constant care and attention for at least 12 months because of a serious disability.
