= Occupational welfare =

Welfare from employer

Occupational welfare is welfare distributed by industry as part of employment. First characterized by British social researcher and teacher Richard Titmuss in 1956, occupational welfare includes perks, salary-related benefits, measures intended to improve the efficiency of the workforce and some philanthropic measures.

== See also ==
- Corporate welfare
- Social Policy
- Fiscal Welfare
- Social Welfare
