= Domestic Purposes Benefit =

New Zealand social welfare payment

The Domestic Purposes Benefit (DPB) was a social welfare payment in New Zealand's social security system, primarily given to single parents with dependent children. It, along with all other benefit payments, was managed by Work and Income, under the Ministry of Social Development. Since the Fifth National Government of New Zealand's welfare reforms in July 2013, the main Domestic Purposes Benefit Sole Parent was renamed Sole Parent Support, with the two other DPB benefits, Care of Sick or Infirm and Women Alone, absorbed into other benefits.

== History ==
The Domestic Purposes Benefit, or DPB, was first introduced in New Zealand in 1973 by the country's Third Labour Government led by Prime Minister Norman Kirk. The Destitute Persons Act 1910 and the Domestic Proceedings Act 1968 had previously created a statutory means by which a woman could seek a maintenance order against the father of her children. The court could, at its discretion, set the rate that it thought appropriate for the father to pay the mother in respect of the child. This maintenance continued until the child reached the age of sixteen; maintenance would continue to be payable in respect of a child over the age of sixteen if the child was engaged in full-time education. These statutes provided a means by which women could seek maintenance from the putative father, but in the event of any difficulties, women had to resort to the court in order to enforce the maintenance agreement or order. There were also further difficulties; an unmarried mother had to obtain an acknowledgement of paternity from the father or a declaration of paternity from the court in order to be entitled to seek maintenance. The DPB, introduced in statutory form in 1973, mitigated these difficulties. The Act provided State financial support for single mothers, irrespective of whether the father was contributing to maintenance payments.

The introduction of the DPB was blamed for "creating a shortage of babies for adoption". However, the extent to which the DPB contributed to the shortage of babies available for adoption is unclear. The number of births outside of marriage fell between 1971 and 1976. The numbers of ex nuptial children being adopted had started to fall in 1962, before the introduction of State financial support. Else notes that a number of other factors were at work, such as a "softening" of attitudes towards illegitimate children and their mothers, the removal of the stigma of illegitimacy by the Status of Children Act 1969, the increasing availability of contraception and delays in the placement of babies.

In the 2011 New Zealand general election, the ruling centre-right National Party campaigned on, among other policies, welfare reform. National's Welfare Reform plan, called for the streamlining of the existing 11 benefit categories into three, with extra work obligations and focusing on reducing long-term welfare dependency.

Upon winning power in 2011, National's Minister for Social Development and Employment Paula Bennett started implementing the policies. The changes to the welfare system came into effect in July 2013. 7 of the 11 existing benefit categories were replaced with three broad groups – Jobseeker Support (for people who can usually work full-time, only work part-time or can't work at the moment), Sole Parent Support (for solo parents caring for children under 14) and the Supported Living Payment (for those who are unable to work and those caring for someone needing significant care).

Response to the reforms have been mixed. A New Zealand Herald article on the reforms states under the heading 'The rationale' that 'New Zealand has among the world's highest rates of sole parenthood, especially among low-income groups for whom the DPB may seem a viable option.' But under the heading 'The risks', it says that '...the risk (of reform) is that it will also cause unintended harm to the majority of women who end up on the DPB through no fault of their own.'

== Details ==
=== Domestic Purposes Benefit – Sole Parent ===
The Domestic Purposes Benefit – Sole Parent is the main DPB benefit. It is a weekly payment to sole parents with one or more dependent children.

It is primarily awarded to a parent who is 19 years old or over, has a dependent child under 18 and who does not have a partner or has lost the support of their partner. A parent whose youngest child is under five years old needs to take practical steps to get ready for work. If their youngest child is aged between five and 13 (five being the earliest age a child can attend school, although it is not compulsory until the child turns six) they are expected to be in, or be actively seeking part-time work of at least 15 hours per week. If their youngest child is aged 14 or older (14 being the minimum legal age which children can be left unattended) they are expected to be in, or be actively seeking full-time work of at least 30 hours per week. If they do not meet these work obligations and do not have an exemption, their benefit may be reduced or stopped.

The benefit is a fixed amount for parents who earn $100 or less in other income per week, which as of 15 July 2013 is $335.18 before tax per week. The benefit amount is reduced by 30c per dollar earned between $100 and $200, and 70c per dollar earned over $200. The gross income cut-out point is $577 per week.

As of April 2014, this benefit has been mainly replaced by Sole Parent Support if the child is aged under 14 (a maximum net weekly payment of NZ$299.45 for those earning less than NZ$5200 a year – as well as NZ$20 extra per week if childcare costs are needed – and the gross income cut-out point is NZ$585 a week) or Jobseeker Support if the child is aged over 14 (a maximum net weekly payment of NZ$299.45 for sole parents). Both statistics are as of 1 April 2014.

=== Domestic Purposes Benefit – Care of Sick or Infirm ===
Domestic Purposes Benefit – Care of Sick or Infirm is a weekly payment which helps people who are caring for someone at home who needs full-time care.

As of 1 April 2014, the Domestic Purposes Benefit – Care of Sick or Infirm, has been replaced by the Supported Living Payment. The Supported Living Payment goes from a minimum weekly net payment of NZ$211.46 for single 16- and 17-year-olds to a maximum payment of NZ$435.50 for a married couple, de facto couple or a civil union couple. The maximum gross income cut-off point is NZ$780 per week for couples.

=== Domestic Purposes Benefit – Woman Alone ===
Domestic Purposes Benefit – Woman Alone is a weekly payment which helps women aged 50 or over (but under the age of New Zealand Superannuation, i.e. 65) who have lost the support of their partner or finished caring for a child or sick relative.

As of 1 April 2014, the Domestic Purposes Benefit has been replaced by Jobseeker Support. The maximum net weekly payment for those who was receiving the old DPB before 15 July 2013 is NZ$217.75 with a gross weekly income cut-off point of NZ$469. There is no dedicated category now for single women over 50: those applying after 15 July 2013 will receive the Jobseeker Support payment for those aged 25+, together with the obligations to find work that brings. The net weekly benefit is NZ$209.06 with a gross weekly income cut-off point of NZ$379.

== Benefit numbers ==
At the end of December 2012, 109,000 working-age people (aged 18–64 years) were receiving a Domestic Purposes Benefit. This represents around 4% of the working age population of New Zealand.
