= 1997 New Zealand pensions referendum =

- 26 September 1997
- Do you support the proposed compulsory retirement savings scheme?

Results
Choice	Votes	%
Yes	163,209	8.23%
No	1,820,403	91.77%
Valid votes	1,983,612	99.75%
Invalid or blank votes	4,938	0.25%
Total votes	1,988,550	100.00%
Registered voters/turnout	2,475,220	80.34%

A referendum on introducing a compulsory retirement savings scheme was held in New Zealand on 26 September 1997. The question put in the referendum was "Do you support the proposed compulsory retirement savings scheme?" The proposal was rejected by 92% of voters, with a turnout of 80%.

The design of the proposed savings scheme and the referendum were a result of the coalition agreement between the National Party and New Zealand First following the 1996 general elections. The referendum was set up by the Compulsory Retirement Savings Scheme Referendum Act 1997.

== Results ==
Choice	Votes	%
For	163,209	8.23
Against	1,820,403	91.77
Total	1,983,612	100.00
Valid votes	1,983,612	99.75
Invalid/blank votes	4,938	0.25
Total votes	1,988,550	100.00
Registered voters/turnout	2,475,220	80.34
Source: Nohlen et al.
