= Human Rights Review Tribunal =

Institution in New Zealand

The Human Rights Review Tribunal is a statutorily established institution fundamental to the application, determination and up holding of human rights in New Zealand. The tribunal is established under the New Zealand Human Rights Act 1993. The Human Rights Review Tribunal is one of two key human rights bodies in New Zealand and provides the mechanism for adjudication and resolution of human rights issues. The jurisdiction of the tribunal extends to cover matters from domestic human rights law, principles given in the Privacy Act 1993 and the Health and Disability Commissioner Act 1994. Complaints may be bought by the Director of Human Rights or where it is deemed not appropriate to do so, a citizen may proceed with a claim at their own cost. The tribunal has the power to grant a wide range of remedies and in making a determination, is not required to give effect to technicalities but rather, the substantial merits of the case. The Human Rights Review tribunal also holds special status within the array of tribunals in New Zealands domestic legal system, with a far more significant legal jurisdiction than other inter partes tribunals. This special status reflects the fact that decisions of the tribunal can have substantial political and societal implications.

== Composition ==
Members of the Human Rights Review Tribunal are normally selected on the basis of knowledge or expertise of matters likely to come before the Tribunal. This includes such matters as, international and domestic human rights, public administration, economic, employment or social issues, cultural issues and the needs, aspirations and experiences of different communities within New Zealand. The current Chairperson is Rodger Haines QC. At present there are 10 members aside from the Chairperson who are practising lawyers or who have legal qualifications. Unlike judges, the Chairperson is not accorded tenure.

== Jurisdiction ==
The jurisdiction of the Human Rights Review Tribunal is derived from three different statutes, The Human Rights Act 1993, The privacy Act 1993 and the Health and Disability Commissioner Act 1994, with claims allowed to be bought where discrimination has occurred on grounds prohibited under these acts. The Human Rights Act protects against unlawful discrimination, such as discrimination based on race, gender, sexual orientation, ethnic origin, disability and political opinion. The Health and Disability Commissioner Act 1994 sets out the standards expected of health care providers in areas such as respecting patient privacy, ensuring services comply with relevant legal, ethical or other professional standards, and providing full information. The Privacy Act governs agencies which collect, hold and use personal information. It does so by way of a set of Privacy Principles. Alleged infringements of the Privacy Principles (or of codes of practice made under the Privacy Act, such as the Health Information Privacy Code) can be brought before the Tribunal for adjudication. The ground on which a claim can be brought are therefore of a wide variety.

== Claims process ==
A claim may be made against another person or government agency, with these claims being brought by The Office of Human Rights Proceedings, a complainant or any other aggrieved party. Proceedings may be bought by the Director of Human Rights Proceedings. When making a decision on representation, the Director must consider certain factors including whether the complaint raises a significant question of law and whether or not providing representation would be in the public interest. Should the Director choose not to proceed then a complainant may bring an action but at their own cost. Proceedings are to be commenced by the lodging of an application in a prescribed form.

== Hearing procedure ==
Sittings of the Human Rights Review Tribunal are held at such times and places as directed by the Chairperson. The litigants may represent themselves or acquire the assistance of legal representation. All members of the tribunal must be present at a sitting but the decisions are by majority. The tribunal, unlike a court, must act according to the substantial merits of the case and not be bound by technicalities. In exercising its powers and functions the Tribunal must act in accordance with the principles of natural justice; in a manner that is fair and reasonable; and according to equity and good conscience. The Tribunal may call for evidence, call on witnesses and generally require the evidence to be given under oath. The Tribunal adjudicates to the civil standard of proof and that is the balance of probabilities, and the tribunals focus is on assessing the parties conduct. Also the tribunal, if it considers it necessary, can dismiss any claims it considers frivolous, vexatious or not brought in good faith. Every decision that grants a remedy or dismisses a claim, must be given in writing with reasons. These reasons must include, findings of fact, explanations and findings of the relevant legal issues and its conclusions on such matters. The option is available to the claimant to have the Human Rights commission attempt a settlement before tribunal proceedings, and should settlement not first be attempted, it is likely the Director will not consider acting on behalf of the claimant.

== Remedies ==
The Tribunal may award a wide range of remedies with the appropriate choice being determined by the circumstances of the case. these remedies include, a declaration of a breach of the Human Rights Act 1993, damages up to $350,000 which is equivalent to the general jurisdiction afforded to New Zealand District Courts under the District Courts Act 1947 (s29). An order that the defendant perform any acts specified in the order with a view to redressing any loss or damage suffered by the complainant or, as the case may be, the aggrieved person as a result of the breach. A declaration that any contract entered into or performed in contravention of any provision of Part 1A or Part 2 of the Human Rights Act 1993 is an illegal contract. An order that the defendant undertakes any specified training or any other programme, or implement any specified policy or programme, to enable the defendant to comply with the provisions of the Human Rights Act 1993. Or any other relief that the Tribunal thinks fit.

== Special status among tribunals ==
It has been said that the Human Rights Review Tribunal holds special significance in New Zealands tribunal system. The tribunal in granting damages, is the only tribunal accorded the full power of a district courts in terms pecuniary limit and significantly, has the power to issue a declaration that legislation is inconsistent with the New Zealand Bill of Rights Act 1990. Such a declaration has wide reaching repercussions and requires for the executive to place more emphasis on human rights in the creation of legislation. The other significant feature of the tribunal is that its decisions can carry substantial political and societal implications which in term reflects its important role and function within the New Zealand legal system. An example is the fact that the tribunal can deal with matters of political sensitivity such as the human rights of prisoners. These factors act to show the fundamental importance of the Human Rights Review Tribunal. It is a fundamental body for the providing maintenance, access and the upholding of human rights in New Zealand.It has been suggested as such that the Chairperson be granted tenure to the level of a district court judge or even High court judge, however, these suggestions have not been met with legislative effect.

== Costs ==
The costs associated with the tribunal are significantly less than those of litigating in court with the average per day being only $3,750. The minimal costs means that barriers to enforcement of human rights are minimised allowing access to justice. Further the costs may be covered by the Director of Human Rights Proceedings should the case be undertaken on behalf of the claimant. Should a claimant succeed on the merits of their case the Tribunal has the power to award their costs to be paid by the defendant.

== See also ==
- Director of Human Rights Proceedings v INS Restorations Ltd
- Lochead-MacMillan v AMI Insurance Ltd
