= Foundation for Research, Science and Technology =

Crown entity in New Zealand

Agency overview
- Formed: 1990
- Dissolved: 2011
- Superseding agency: Ministry of Science and Innovation
- Jurisdiction: Government of New Zealand
- Headquarters: Level 11, AT&T Tower, 15-17 Murphy Street, Thorndon, Wellington
- Agency executive: Murray Bain, Chief Executive
- Website: www.frst.govt.nz

The Foundation for Research, Science and Technology (Māori: Tūāpapa Rangahau Pūtaiao) was a Crown entity of New Zealand, established by the Foundation for Research, Science, and Technology Act 1990.

It had the stated mission of "investing for results from research, science and technology to deliver greater prosperity, security and opportunities to all New Zealanders".

In 2011, the Foundation for Research, Science and Technology merged with the Ministry of Research, Science and Technology (MoRST) to form the new Ministry of Science and Innovation (MSI), which took over the policy and investment functions of both agencies.

MSI became fully operational on 1 February 2011, at which point MoRST and the Foundation for Research, Science and Technology were disestablished.

In March 2012, Prime Minister John Key announced that the Ministry of Science and Innovation would be integrated into a new Ministry of Business, Innovation and Employment, comprising the Ministry of Economic Development, the Department of Labour, Ministry of Science and Innovation and the Department of Building and Housing. The new Ministry began operating on 1 July 2012.
