= New Zealand property bubble =

Economic bubble

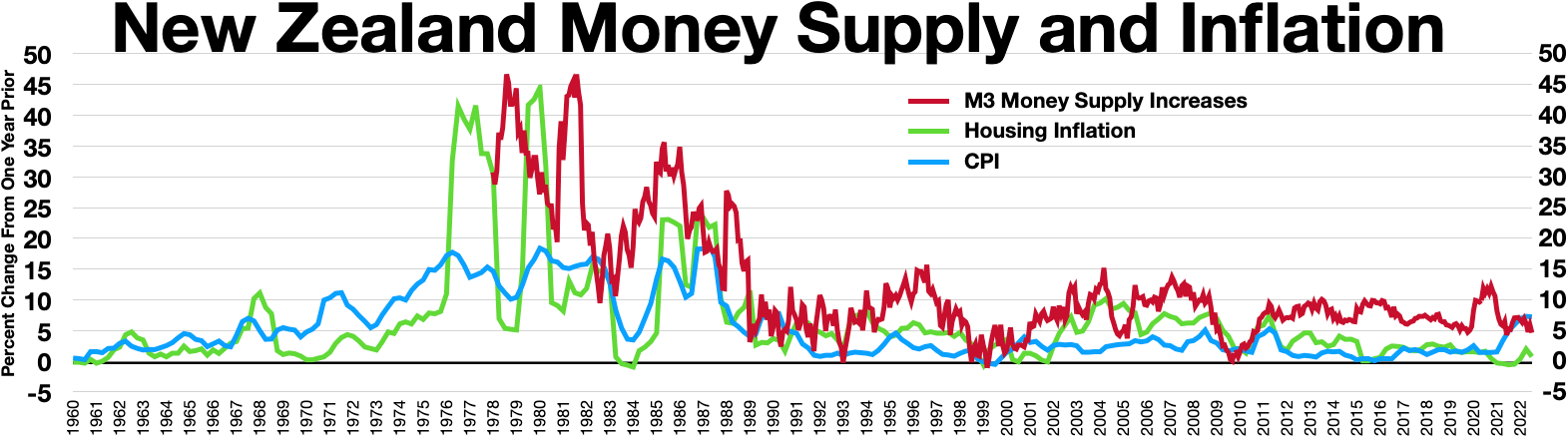
New Zealand money supply and inflation M3 money supply increases Housing inflation Consumer price index

The property bubble in New Zealand is a major national economic and social issue. Since the early 1990s, house prices in New Zealand have risen considerably faster than incomes, putting increasing pressure on public housing providers as fewer households have access to housing on the private market. The property bubble has produced significant impacts on economic inequality in New Zealand, which now has one of the highest homelessness rate in the OECD and a record-high waiting list for public housing. Government policies have attempted to address the crisis since 2013, but have produced limited impacts to reduce prices or increase the supply of affordable housing. However, prices started falling in 2022 in response to tightening of mortgage availability and supply increasing. Some areas saw drops as high as around 9% - albeit from very high prices.

Unaffordable housing has produced profound impacts on New Zealand society. Between 1986 and 2013, home ownership dropped from 74% to 65%.

== Background ==
A house price bubble is defined by economist Joseph Stiglitz as a period of speculative purchases, where investors demonstrate willingness to pay a high price today because they believe that it will be as high (or higher) tomorrow. A 2016 study found evidence of a bubble in the New Zealand housing market from 2003, which stalled in 2007/8 with the impacts of the Great Recession. A second bubble appeared in Auckland in 2013, and until 2015 there were no notable spillover effects to other regions. However, from 2015 onwards, rapid price-growth occurred in smaller centres.

Housing in New Zealand has been strongly shaped by historic events, including colonisation by Europeans beginning in the 19th century, and state intervention in the early 20th Century and again in the 1980s. The indigenous Māori population traditionally lived communally. In contrast, European settlers tended to prefer detached homes for nuclear families, each built on a separate section of land known as the quarter acre, which expressed a similar sentiment to the American white picket fence. There are strong social trends in New Zealand seeking home-ownership, and the real-estate industry promotes the concept of attaining wealth or social status by use of a property ladder where buyers start with a smaller or modest home and occasionally sell this property and uses profits from the sale to finance a larger or more luxurious home. Many New Zealand politicians foster the idea of a stable democracy rooted in property-ownership.

In 1977, the Town and Planning Act was passed, which began to make it easier for existing residents to oppose new housing nearby and force down-zoning, known as NIMBY for "Not in my backyard". Later analysis said this 1977 act caused house prices to rise by an average of 2% for every 1% increase in population between 1977-2018, compared with 0.5% rise per 1% population increase between 1938-1977.

The fourth Labour Government (elected in 1984) rapidly introduced policies of economic deregulation, as a result of the previous Prime Minister Robert Muldoon's Think Big policies which had left the country heavily in debt. Investment in shares, or stock ownership of businesses, increased rapidly, but often with little due diligence carried out. The 1987 sharemarket crash which began in the United States and spread globally hit New Zealand's market especially hard. The NZSE dropped around 60% from its peak, and needed more recovery time than most other developed markets. The refusal of New Zealand to loosen their monetary policy in response to the market downturn was a contributing factor in the prolonged recovery.

Many investors who lost heavily in the 1987 crash never returned to the sharemarket, instead opting for the perceived safety of property investment.

In 1989 Parliament passed the Reserve Bank Act, which emphasised controlling inflation and keeping lower interest rates, which in turn reduced the costs of borrowing for fixed assets such as houses. In the same year, tax exemptions for pension, insurance and other similar investments were abolished, but not for real estate. Two years later, the Resource Management Act (RMA) replaced a raft of regional-planning laws, including the Town and Planning Act. Some have regarded the RMA as an obstacle to building affordable housing. Although builds and sell-offs of state houses have happened in cycles since the inception of the state housing scheme, they were sold off in record numbers during the 1990s without being replaced. The number of state houses in the country peaked at 70,000 in 1991 until the sell-offs.

Alongside institutional reforms in the housing sector, problems with poor-quality construction, historic injustices and under-provision for the needs of indigenous Māori, and persistent income inequality, the lack of affordable housing is a critical issue. Since the Great Recession, the rapid growth in house prices has spawned an affordable housing crisis and housing has been a prominent issue on political agendas since 2013. Despite a number of policy interventions to address the crisis, prices have continued to grow across the country. As shown below, real house-prices increased almost three-fold between 2000 and 2018.

View source data.

== Affordability crisis ==
While house prices increased almost-continuously from the early 1990s, it was not until 2007 that the media started reporting an affordability crisis. Nationwide, property prices increased 80% in real terms between 2002 and 2008. The Great Recession led to a 10% drop in nominal prices in 2008, however price growth then picked up again significantly and, by 2014, nominal prices in Auckland were 34% higher than the pre-crisis peak.

As of 2019, the average house price in New Zealand exceeded NZ$700,000, with average prices in the country's largest city, Auckland, exceeding $1,000,000 in numerous suburbs. The ratio between median house price and median annual household income increased from just over 3.0 in January 2002 to 6.27 in March 2017, with Auckland's figures 4.0 to 9.81 respectively.

As of 2021, the average house price in New Zealand exceeded $1,000,000.

In 2017, the Demographia think-tank ranked Auckland's housing market the fourth-most unaffordable in the world—behind Hong Kong, Sydney and Vancouver—with median house prices rising from 6.4 times the median income in 2008 to 10 times in 2017. Another study carried out in 2016 reported that average house prices in Auckland surpassed those of Sydney. That same year, the International Monetary Fund ranked New Zealand at the top for housing unaffordability in the OECD, and has called for taxation of property speculation.

Multiple property owners in New Zealand are not subject to capital gains taxes and can use negative gearing on their properties, making it an attractive investment option. Prospective house-buyers, however, accuse property investors of crowding them out. When the Tax Working Group reported its findings to Parliament in 2019, a capital gains tax was among its recommendations, only to be shelved after failing to secure enough Parliamentary backing.

According to NZ's 2017 register of pecuniary interests, New Zealand's 120 members of parliament own more than 300 properties between them, prompting accusations of conflict of interest. As of 2025, the combined value of these properties amounted to NZD$379 million, with an average individual valuation of $3.16 million.

NIMBY sentiment among established home-owners—particularly towards attempts to relax building density rules in Auckland such as the Unitary Plan—has also been pointed to as a major factor in the housing bubble. In response, a YIMBY movement of mostly younger people has emerged to call for actions against housing unaffordability, including upzoning.

In late 2021, it was reported by property data company Valocity that over 22,100 homes were owned by "mega-landlords" who owned more than 20 properties each, as part of a trend towards further concentration of the housing market by investors.

=== Regional dynamics ===
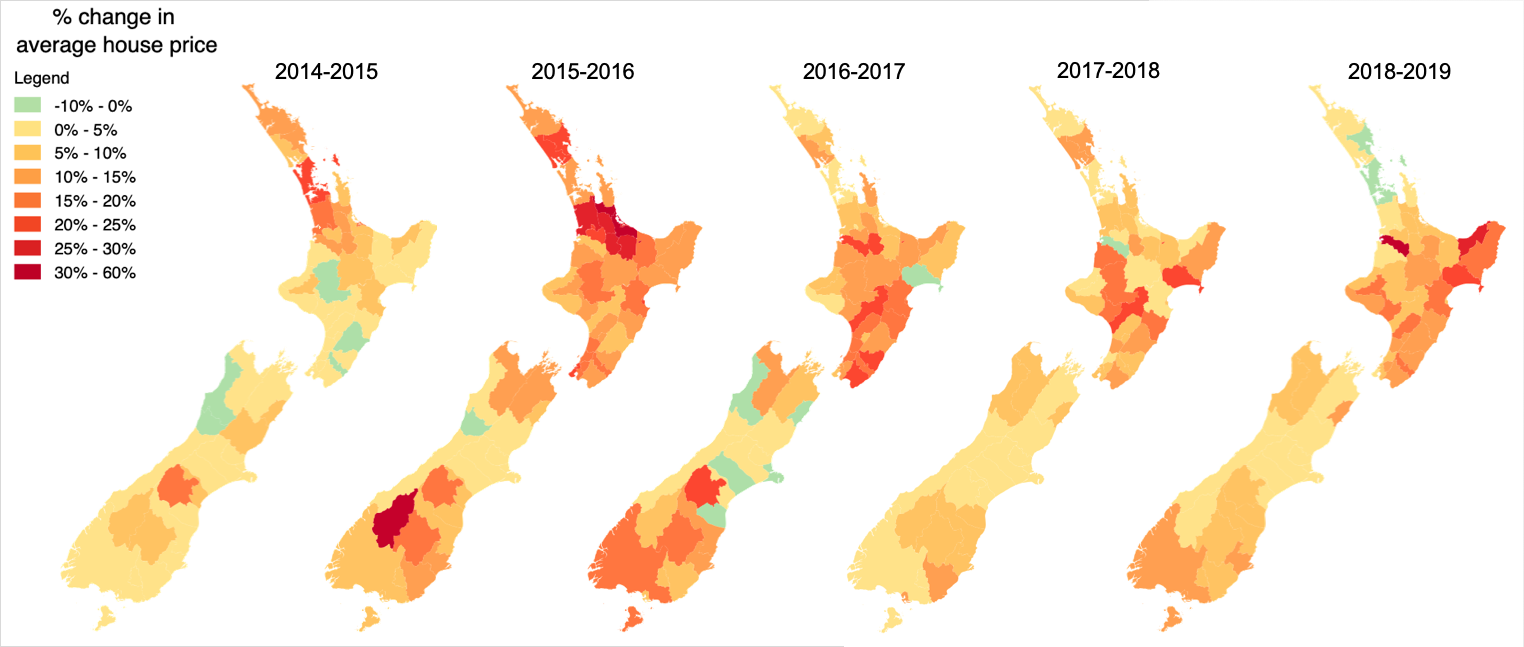
Annual change in average house price, 2014–2019. Source: QV.

=== Social impacts of the affordability crisis ===
Unaffordable housing has produced profound impacts on New Zealand society. Between 1986 and 2013, home ownership dropped from 74% to 65%.

The most recent statistics on homelessness, from the 2013 Census, showed that 1% of the population were living in severe housing deprivation. Of this population 71% are temporarily resident in severely crowded private dwellings, 19% live in commercial dwellings or marae, and 10% live on the street or in a car. Between 2017 and 2019, the waiting list for public housing doubled, reaching a record 12,500 in August 2019. In 2018, a report found that emergency housing providers were turning away 80–90% of those seeking assistance. In 2024, eligibility rules for emergency housing were tightened.

Public housing waitlist
Year	Eligible families and individuals waiting for public housing
Sep-14	4,189
Sep-15	3,399
Sep-16	4,602
Sep-17	5,844
Sep-18	9,546
Sep-19	13,966
Sep-20	21,415
Sep-21	24,546
Sep-22	24,996
Sep-23	25,284
Sep-24	21,957
Sep-25	19,431

The substantial growth of property prices over recent decades has significantly influenced the distribution of wealth in New Zealand. The 2019 National Business Review Rich List showed that eight of the top 25 wealthiest people made their money from property, and 16 of the 20 new additions to the list also became wealthy through property investment. Rising prices have been attributed to various factors including deregulation, mass immigration and politics, with considerable debate over how to address the issue due to its large size relative to the economy.

The Loafers Lodge fire in May 2023, where five people died and 20 were injured, further increased scrutiny on the housing crisis' effects.

== Policy responses ==
Policies to address the housing affordability crisis cover land use and planning regulation, state housing provision, rules on ownership and investment, and financial regulation.

=== National government, 2008–2017 ===
==== Special Housing Areas ====
In 2013, the government passed the Housing Accord and Special Housing Areas Act 2013, introducing Special Housing Areas (SHAs) to increase land supply in urban areas. Within designated SHAs, developments larger than 14 dwellings were required to allocate 10% of housing at 'affordable' prices. Affordability was defined as 75% of the region's median house price, or a price at which households earning up to 120% of median household income would spend no more than 30% of gross income on rent or mortgage repayments. Research showed that little evidence for the effectiveness of this policy to improve affordability. The act was not extended beyond 2019, after generating disappointing results.

From 2016, the housing development planned by Fletcher Building on a designated Special Housing Area at Ihumātao was opposed by protesters, who set up a camp at the site. Opponents contended that the land was confiscated during the Waikato War in 1863, in breach of the Treaty of Waitangi. In 2017 the United Nations recommended that the New Zealand Government review the designation of Ihumātao as a Special Housing Area, drawing attention to potential breaches of human rights. In 2019, after protestors were served an eviction notice and police presence escalated, the prime minister announced that no development would take place at Ihumātao while the government attempted to broker a solution.

==== Bright-line test ====
In October 2015 the government introduced a bright-line test to reduce speculative investment. This test applies to all property acquired after the law was introduced, and taxes capital gains at the same level as the seller's income tax rate.

==== Loan-to-value restrictions ====
The loan-to-value ratio measures how much a bank lends for a property, compared to the property's total value. Loan-to-value (LVR) restrictions were first introduced in 2013 by the Reserve Bank of New Zealand. The restrictions comprised a 'speed limit' on the proportion of high-LVR loans that banks can issue, and a threshold defining high-LVR loans.

Initial LVR restrictions in October 2013 restricted banks to no more than 10% of loans beyond 80% LVR. In 2015, the restrictions were revised to target price inflation in Auckland, easing the restrictions to 15% over 80% LVR for non-Auckland loans, and increasing to 5% over 70% LVR for investor purchases in Auckland. In 2016 the restrictions tightened further on Auckland investors, to 5% over 60% LVR.

Since 2018, LVR restrictions gradually reduced to 20% over 80% for owner-occupiers, and 5% over 70% for investors. In April 2020 the Reserve Bank lifted restrictions on mortgage borrowing in response to the COVID-19 pandemic, to ensure that the LVR rules did not unduly affect lenders or borrowers as part of the mortgage deferral scheme introduced in response to the pandemic.

The Reserve Bank has suggested that the targeted restriction for Auckland properties in 2015 may have contributed to price inflation in other regions.

==== National Policy Statement on Urban Development capacity (NPS-UDC) ====
The NPS-UDC is planned to be replaced by the National Policy Statement on Urban Development (NPS-UD), which the government consulted on in 2019.

The purpose of the NPS-UDC, introduced in 2016, was to ensure that sufficient development capacity was provided by local authorities, to meet demand for land for housing and commercial use. The NPS-UDC provided targeted measures for high-growth areas.

=== Labour-New Zealand First-Green government, 2017–2020 ===
==== Foreign ownership ban ====
In August 2018 the New Zealand Parliament passed a law to ban non-resident foreigners from buying existing homes, delivering on a New Zealand First Party's election promise. The law allows non-residents to own up to 60% of units in new-build apartment blocks, however, they are not permitted to buy existing homes. Immigration remained a topic of controversy in regard to housing affordability; the Reserve Bank and others cited immigration as a factor in rising house-prices. Annual net migration as of 2017 was approximately 70,000, compared with an average of 15,000 in the previous 25 years. However the Ministry of Business, Innovation and Employment refuted this emphasis, saying that New Zealanders returning from overseas make up much of the inflows, and that there was a need to allow in "skilled migrants required to ramp up housing supply". In 2016 it was reported that Auckland had over 33,000 "ghost" properties that were registered as unoccupied, many of them believed to be owned by absentee foreigners.

==== Extension of bright-line test ====
The bright-line test introduced under the previous administration was extended to five years, to reduce incentives for speculative investment in property. The five-year rule applies to properties purchased after March 2018, and the main family home is exempt. Changes in legal ownership for a property can count as a disposal, and can "reset the clock" on the five-year limit, even if the property is substantively owned and controlled by the same person.

==== State housing construction ====
In December 2017 the Labour-NZ First-Green coalition government stopped the sale of Housing New Zealand properties, and committed to expanding the supply of public housing.

==== KiwiBuild ====
KiwiBuild, the flagship housing policy of the New Zealand Labour Party, proposed to deliver 100,000 houses in ten years to address the affordability crisis. The scheme planned to boost housing supply by giving property developers more incentives to deliver affordable homes rapidly. This included the Land for Housing programme, which acquired vacant land, on-selling to developers, with conditions of making 20% of dwellings available for public housing and delivering 40% "affordable" housing according to KiwiBuild criteria. The scheme also purchased properties off-the-plans from developers, to sell to eligible buyers. The government was concerned about construction-sector capacity to deliver KiwiBuild's targets, so the KiwiBuild Shortage List was introduced, allowing accredited construction employers to accelerate the immigration process for construction workers.

Criticism of the policy highlighted that the prices of KiwiBuild homes remained out of reach for many, with "affordable" properties costing upward of NZD$500,000 in Auckland, and NZD$300,000–500,000 across the rest of the country. By September 2019 the scheme had delivered only 258 houses – well below the targets. The uptake also showed that the Kiwibuild homes did not attract buyers, with unsold homes released onto the private market in some regions.

===== KiwiBuild reset =====
A "reset" of KiwiBuild was released in 2019, following the reshuffle of ministerial responsibilities for housing and appointment of Megan Woods as Minister for Housing. The revised policy dropped the target to build 100,000 houses in ten years and introduced rent-to-buy and shared-equity options to improve affordability. The requirement for first-home buyers to hold their Kiwibuild homes for at least three years was reduced to one year.

==== National Policy Statement on Urban Development (NPS-UD) ====
The NPS-UD was consulted on in October 2019, to replace and expand on the 2016 NPS-UDC. The NPS-UD has a similar purpose to its predecessor, to enable growth in new areas by removing unnecessary restrictions, targeted to high-growth areas.

The discussion document included a range of requirements for councils, including:

- new objectives for Future Development Strategies, to ensure that growth is coordinated and responsive to demand
- allowing growth through intensification and greenfield development, in a way that contributes to a quality urban environment
- developing and maintaining an evidence base on demand and prices for housing and land
- ensuring the co-ordination of planning across urban areas, taking into account issues of concern for iwi and hapū

The NPS-UD was planned for implementation by mid-2020.

=== Labour government, 2020–2023 ===
==== Repeal of the Resource Management Act ====
In 2020, the Labour Party won a parliamentary majority; in 2021, the new government announced that it planned to repeal the Resource Management Act and to replace it with three separate planning acts:

- the Natural and Built Environments Act, focused on land use and environmental regulation
- the Strategic Planning Act, pulling together laws around development
- the Climate Change Adaptation Act, focused on managed retreat and its funding

The law changes were announced by Environment Minister David Parker following a 2020 high-level independent review into the Resource Management Act, which concluded that the Act had failed in its purpose. The RMA was finally repealed on 16 August, 2023.

==== March 2021 reform ====
As housing affordability worsened throughout February 2021, Jacinda Ardern announced that her government had undertaken a significant review of housing policy:

- Removal of interest rate tax-deduction.
- Housing Aid cap lifted for first home buyers.
- Allocation of infrastructure funds (named Housing Acceleration Fund) for district councils.
- Extension of the Bright Line Test from five to ten years.

Treasury recommended that the Bright Line Test be extended from five to twenty years, double that than what was eventually implemented. Both Inland Revenue and Treasury urged that the government not abolish the interest rate deduction.

Later in the year, a bipartisan agreement on Medium-Density Residential Standards (MDRS) was drafted and signed by the Labour and National Parties in Parliament to relax urban density rules. The new rules would allow houses up to three storeys to be built in existing areas, without the need for a resource consent. Two years later however, the National Party backed out of the agreement, claiming their own housing policy was "more ambitious and allowed discretion and flexibility for councils.".

== Alternative solutions considered ==
=== Tax reform ===
==== Capital gains tax ====
There is currently no tax on capital gains from property investment in New Zealand. The bright-line test introduced in 2015 and extended in 2018 aims to tax capital gains on property, however the main family home, estates, or properties sold through relationship settlements are exempt.

In late 2017, the Labour Government established the Tax Working Group, an advisory group to examine improvements to the fairness and balance of the tax system. The group published its report in February 2019, recommending a tax on capital gains that applies to gains and most losses related to all types of land and improvements, except for the main family home. This tax would apply to rental and second homes, business assets, land and shares. Following robust public and media debate, the government abandoned their plan to introduce the capital gains tax, citing a lack of consensus within government. The OECD and IMF have issued multiple recommendations for the passage of a capital gains tax.

==== Land value tax ====
Land value taxation has been suggested by a series of commentators, including Arthur Grimes and Andrew Coleman, Ryan Greenaway-McGrevy, economist Shamubeel Eaqub and Bernard Hickey.

=== Land use reform ===
In September 2015, the New Zealand Productivity Commission released a comprehensive report on Using land for housing, commissioned by the government to review local council processes for providing land for housing, with a focus on fast-growing areas. According to the report, insufficient supply of developable brownfield and greenfield land was a major contributor to house price growth between 2000 and 2015. It proposed reform in a range of areas:

1. Lifting restrictive planning controls in areas with spare capacity on existing infrastructure networks
2. More effective cost-recovery of infrastructure costs
3. Greater use of cost-benefit analysis for land use rules
4. Granting local urban development authorities (UDAs) more power to develop housing
5. Powers for central government to intervene to ensure sufficient development capacity is released, if councils are unable to release land (this was implemented through the 2016 National Policy Statement on Urban Development Capacity).

=== Financial regulation ===
==== Debt-to-income limits ====
In 2017 the Reserve Bank of New Zealand published a consultation paper on debt-to-income limits, as a tool to restrict credit growth and mitigate the risk of mortgage defaults during an economic downturn. High levels of private debt present a significant macro-economic risk. It reduces household consumption by diverting a large proportion of income to servicing debts and also makes households vulnerable to economic shocks.

== Potential effects of bubble burst ==
According to investment manager Brian Gaynor in 2012, a 10% drop in house prices would wipe out $60 billion of New Zealanders' personal wealth, which would exceed the losses from the 1987 sharemarket crash. Steve Keen, one of the few economists to forecast the Great Recession, warned in mid-2017 that New Zealand would be one of many nations to experience a private debt meltdown involving housing, and that "the bubble will burst in the next one to two years". A report published by Goldman Sachs predicted that New Zealand had a 40% chance of a "housing bust" over the same period. Financial commentator Bernard Hickey described New Zealand's property market in 2014 as "too big to fail", and supports a deposit insurance scheme in the event of a banking collapse caused by a property crash. Later, in 2021, Hickey described New Zealand's economy as "a housing market with bits tacked on".

The Reserve Bank of New Zealand has estimated that the total value of housing loans has increased from just under $60 billion in 1999 to over $220 billion in 2016.

In April 2021 the total value of housing loans was estimated to be $307.9 billion, having grown by over $30 billion in the preceding 12 month period.

== See also ==
- Housing in New Zealand
- KiwiBuild
- Real estate bubble
- Taxation in New Zealand
- New Zealand dream – aspirations of owning a property
- The Property Cycle
