= State Advances Corporation =

Defunct New Zealand government department

The State Advances Corporation was a government agency within the New Zealand government. Established in 1903 as the Government Advances to Settlers Office, it was disestablished in 1974 when its functions were transferred to the Housing Corporation of New Zealand.

== History ==
The Government Advances to Settlers Office was set up in 1903 for the purpose of issuing cheap loans to small farmers, settlers and workers as enabled by the passing of the Advances to Settlers Act, 1894. In between the passing of the act and establishing of the office, operations had been overseen by the Superintendent of the Advances to Settlers working in conjunction with the Treasury. In 1909 the office changed its name briefly to the State Guaranteed Advances Office and again in 1915 to the State Advances Department. In 1935 the government set up a Mortgage Corporation which was merged with State Advances Department to form the State Advances Corporation.

The State Advances Corporation was responsible for the provision of loans and mortgages for the purpose of constructing new houses, buying existing homes or farms, and the re-financing of existing mortgages. It also had responsibility for the construction, letting and administration of the country's state housing stock by way of the Department of Housing Construction.

The corporation ceased to exist on 14 October 1974 when its functions (along with the Housing Division of the Ministry of Works) were inherited by the newly established Housing Corporation of New Zealand.

== See also ==
- State housing in New Zealand
- Minister of Housing (New Zealand)
