= New Zealand King Salmon =

New Zealand aquaculture company

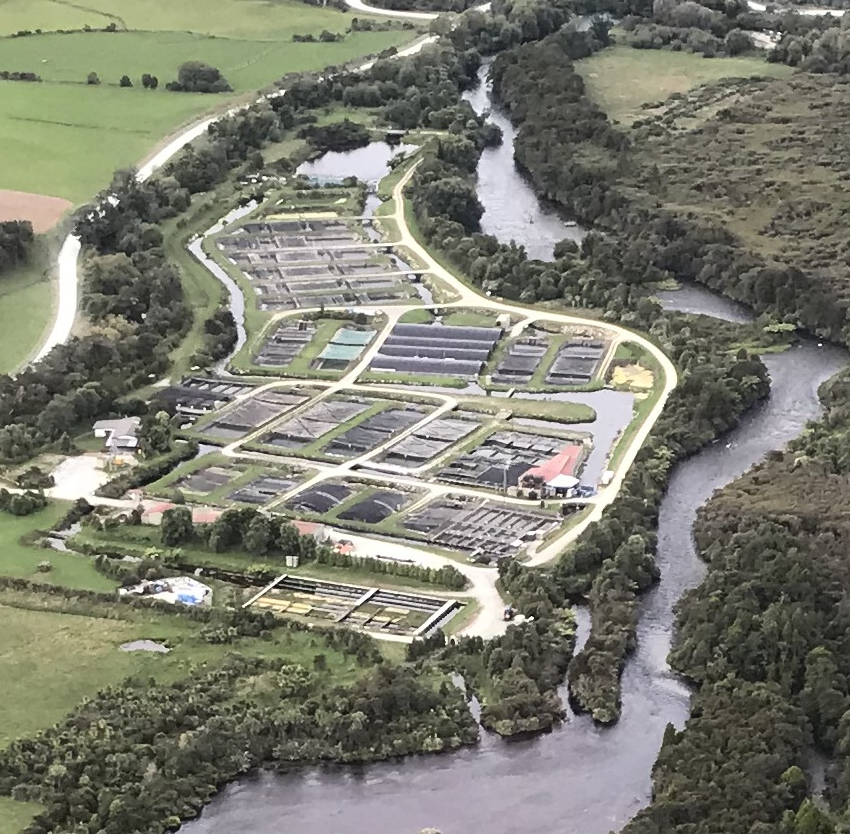
Tākaka hatchery of New Zealand King Salmon

New Zealand King Salmon is an aquaculture business located in the Nelson-Tasman region in New Zealand.

The business' operations include hatchery and broodstock facilities in Tākaka, sea farms in the Marlborough Sounds and a processing facility and corporate head office in Nelson. The company produces around 8,000 tonnes of king salmon annually.

In 2018, the company received the Exporter of the Year Award in the $10 Million-and-over category from the United States Chamber of Commerce, New Zealand.

In 2019, New Zealand King Salmon won an International Business Award from New Zealand Trade and Enterprise.

In 2020, New Zealand King Salmon received a Seafood Stars COVID-19 Response Award for their health and safety initiatives during the COVID-19 pandemic. In addition, a project manager at the company received a Seafood Stars Future Development Innovation Award for creating a sustainable solution for feeding multiple salmon farms from a single location.

The company makes donations to the Fifeshire Foundation, which supports local families in financial need.
