= Ministry of Science and Innovation =

Ministry of Science and Innovation may refer to:

- Ministry of Science (Spain)
- Ministry of Science and Innovation (New Zealand)
