= Health Sponsorship Council =

Agency overview
- Dissolved: 1 July 2012
- Superseding agency: Health Promotion Authority
- Jurisdiction: New Zealand

The Health Sponsorship Council (HSC) was a New Zealand Crown entity that used health promotion to promote health and encourage healthy lifestyles.

The long-term focus of the HSC was on reducing the social, financial and health sector costs of smoking, skin cancer, problem gambling, and obesity.

HSC communicated with the public using marketing tools such as sponsorship, advertising, partnerships and school-based activities.

HSC’s health promotion activities and campaigns included Slip, Slop, Slap and Wrap; Smoking Not Our Future; Auahi Kore; Face the Facts; Smokefree Schools; Choice Not Chance; Breakfast-eaters have it better; and Feeding our Families.

== History ==
HSC was established in 1990 following enactment of the Smoke-free Environments Act 1990, and dissolved following the enactment of the New Zealand Public Health and Disability Amendment Act 2012.

On 1 July 2012 the functions of HSC were taken over by a new Crown entity known as the Health Promotion Agency (HPA). HPA's work includes all of the HSC's functions as well as those of the Alcohol Advisory Council (ALAC) and some health promotion functions from the Ministry of Health.

== Research ==
HSC undertook and commissioned research to both inform and evaluate its health promotion activities and, in particular, the campaigns. Research findings were published on the HSC website and included insights into health and lifestyles, sun exposure, and attitudes to smoking.

== Awards ==
- 2011: Kanvas distinguished as an Official Honoree in the Best Visual Design – Aesthetic category at the 15th Annual Webby Awards
- 2010: Smoking Not Our Future’s online game Kanvas, designed and created by Resn, won the Non-Profit category at the 5th Annual Pixel Awards.
- 2002: The Health Sponsorship Council was awarded the World Health Organization's “Tobacco or Health” Medal for replacing tobacco sponsorship of sport and promoting tobacco-free sport.
