= Josiah Tualamaliʻi =

Samoan New Zealander health and social justice advocate

- Born: Dunedin, New Zealand
- Education: University of Canterbury (BA, MA Distinction)
- Occupation: Former New Zealand Children's Commissioner
- Board member of: Te Hiringa Mahara

Josiah Tavita Tualamaliʻi is a New Zealand health and social justice advocate. He was a co-founder of the Pacific Youth Leadership and Transformation Trust and was a member of the New Zealand Government Inquiry into Mental Health and Addiction. He is a former New Zealand Children's Commissioner of the Children and Young People's Commission and a current board member of Te Hiringa Mahara - the Mental Health and Wellbeing Commission.

== Biography ==
Tualamaliʻi was born in Dunedin and was educated at Middleton Grange School. He is a graduate of the University of Canterbury where he gained a Bachelor of Arts in 2019. As a member of Christchurch's Pacific community, Tualamaliʻi helped establish the Pacific Youth Leadership and Transformation Trust (PYLAT) and has served as its treasurer and chair. Concurrently, Tualamaliʻi supported the development of iSPEAK, a forum for Pacific youth to discuss issues affecting people in New Zealand, such as Christchurch's recovery from the 2011 earthquake, justice and housing. Tualamali'i retired from the PYLAT board and programme in December 2025 after 15 years service. In July 2023 he was appointed as a New Zealand Children's Commissioner of the Children and Young People's Commission and served for two years. He is the youngest person to ever be a New Zealand Children's Commissioner and first of Pacific and Samoan descent. He completed his Master of Arts in History with Distinction at the University of Canterbury in 2025. His dissertation research focused on his great-grandmother and her life - it is titled; Charlotte Leslie: Private Citizen and Unintentional Public Figure. In 2026 as part of the Antarctic Heritage Trust (New Zealand) Inspiring Explorers programme he travelled to the Antarctic peninsula.

== Health and wellbeing leadership ==
While serving on the board of Pacific wellbeing charity Le Va, Tualamaliʻi was appointed as a member of the New Zealand Government's Inquiry into Mental Health and Addiction. Subsequently, he was appointed as a member of the Psychotherapy Board of Aotearoa New Zealand in 2019 and in 2020 became an advisor with lived experience for the Lancet Commission on Depression. The commission's report showed evidence that depression has become one of the leading causes of avoidable suffering globally. In October 2025 the New Zealand Government appointed Tualamali'i as a board member of Independent Crown Entity Te Hiringa Mahara - The Mental Health and Wellbeing Commission.

== Social justice advocacy ==
In 2020, Tualamaliʻi co-brought a case to the Broadcasting Standards Authority against broadcaster Sean Plunket. While discussing an iwi roadblock intended to protect its elderly members from the COVID-19 pandemic, Plunket levelled accusations that a Māori iwi "did not care about child abuse". Tualamaliʻi's case was upheld and the Broadcasting Standards Authority fined Plunket's employer MediaWorks New Zealand and ordered it to issue an on-air apology for the “offensive and harmful” interview.

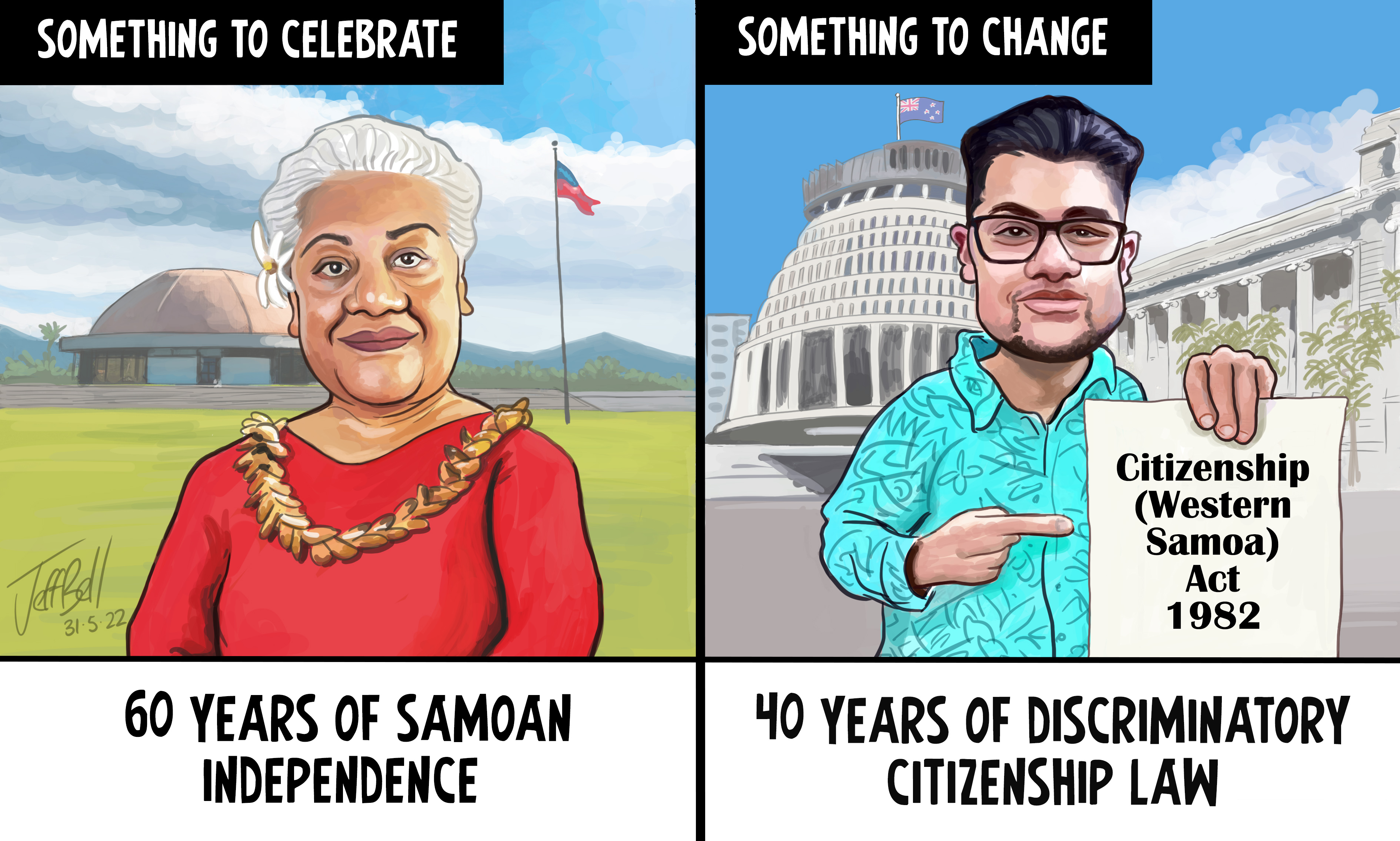
2012 was 60 years since Samoa became independent. Josiah Tualamal'i wrote an article that this anniversary was an important time to reflect on imbalances in the relationships. He called for removal of the Citizenship (Western Samoa) Act 1982.

Tualamaliʻi and Benji Timu co-led the youth component of the campaign for the New Zealand government to issue a formal apology for the Dawn Raids after describing the actions as "government‑sanctioned racism". On 1 August 2021, a formal apology was given by New Zealand Prime Minister Jacinda Ardern in a public ifoga ceremony before 1,000 Pasifika guests at the Auckland Town Hall. As part of the apology, the government announced that it would provide resources for schools to teach the dawn raids, $2.1 million towards academic and vocational scholarships for Pacific communities and $1 million towards Manaaki New Zealand short term scholarship training courses for delegates from Samoa, Tonga, Tuvalu, and Fiji. One year after the apology Timu directed and Tualamali'i produced a documentary on the Polynesian Panther Party Legacy Trust "How We Made it to 50 years.". He has continued advocating for broader aspects he and community leaders see are still to be addressed. In 2025 his Grandmother received her New Zealand citizenship as a result of the community campaigning to address the impacts of the Dawn Raids through taking Falema'i Lesa's case to the Privy Council in 1982. The returning of the citizenship was a result of the Citizenship (Western Samoa) (Restoration) Amendment Act 2024

Tualamali'i has also been part of advocacy teams in 2020 who successfully advocated against routine arming of the New Zealand Police and in 2022 to remove library fines in Christchurch, New Zealand.

== Recognition and awards ==
Tualamaliʻi won a Civic Award for Youth Advocacy from the Christchurch City Council in 2016 and was nationally recognised the same year with the Prime Minister's Pacific Youth Leadership and Inspiration Award. He received the Pacific Emerging Leadership Award in 2020.

Tualamaliʻi was named as a semi-finalist for the Young New Zealander of the Year Awards in 2018 alongside fellow University of Canterbury alumnus Logan Williams and in 2022 alongside fellow University of Canterbury alumnus and author, Abbas Nazari. He was a finalist in the 2024 awards.

In 2018 Apolitical named Tualamali'i as one of "100 Future Leaders: The World's Most Influential Young People in Government."

== Bibliography ==
- Government Inquiry into Mental Health and Addiction. (2018). He Ara Oranga : Report of the Government Inquiry into Mental Health and Addiction. Government of New Zealand
- El Omrani, O., Carmen, V. A., Bionat, J. F., Ghebreyesus, T. A., Fore, H., & Wickramanayake, J. (2021). COVID-19, mental health, and Young People's engagement. Journal of Adolescent Health. https://doi.org/10.1016/j.jadohealth.2021.03.02
- Radio New Zealand. (2020). Episode 15: Josiah Tualamaliʻi. Radio New Zealand. Retrieved April 12, 2022, from https://www.rnz.co.nz/programmes/the-outliers/story/2018746471/episode-15-josiah-tualamali-i-the-outliers.
