= Minister for Building and Construction (New Zealand) =

New Zealand minister of the Crown

- Coat of arms of New Zealand

- Flag of New Zealand

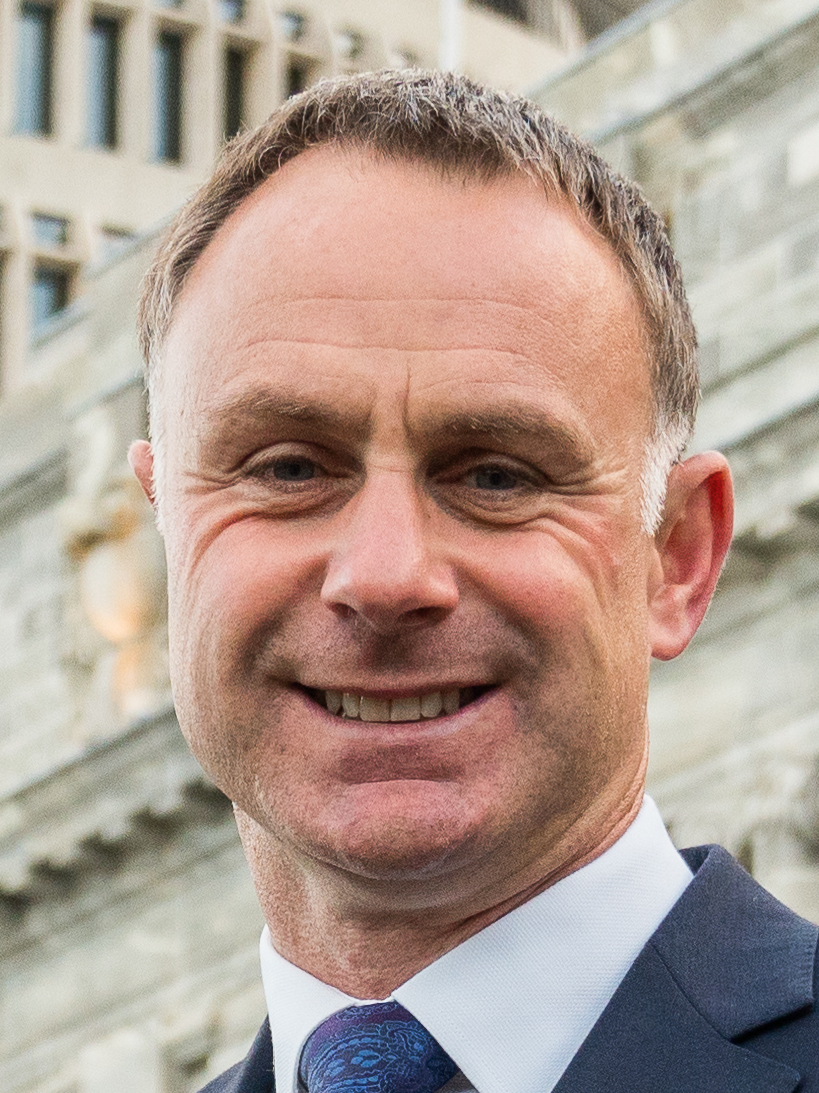
- Incumbent; Simon Watts since 13 August 2026
- Ministry of Business, Innovation and Employment
- Style: The Honourable
- Member of: Cabinet of New Zealand; Executive Council
- Reports to: Prime Minister of New Zealand
- Appointer: Governor-General of New Zealand
- Term length: At His Majesty's pleasure
- Precursor: Minister of Building Issues; Minister for Building and Housing
- Formation: 1 November 2004
- First holder: Margaret Wilson
- Salary: $288,900
- Website: www.beehive.govt.nz

The Minister for Building and Construction is a minister in the New Zealand Government with responsibility for the government's building, construction and housing programmes. The position was established in 2004 as the Minister for Building Issues.

The present Minister is Simon Watts, a member of the National Party.

== Responsibilities and powers ==
The minister's responsibilities include the regulation of the building and construction sector, including setting the performance requirements for buildings and building products. The portfolio is administered by the Ministry of Business, Innovation and Employment.

The primary legislation for the portfolio is the Building Act 2004, which sets out the rules for the construction, alteration, demolition and maintenance of new and existing buildings in New Zealand. The minister also oversees the regulation of engineers, plumbers, gasfitters, drainlayers and architects.

== History ==
In 2004, following its 2003 review of the housing sector amid the leaky homes crisis, the Fifth Labour Government announced plans to reconfigure government services related to building and housing. A new Department of Building and Housing was created by disestablishing the existing Ministry of Housing and transferring relevant functions from the Ministry of Economic Development, Department of Internal Affairs and Ministry of Social Development. The new agency was to report to two Ministers: the Minister of Housing (an existing role) and the new Minister of Building Issues.

It had been suggested that John Tamihere, an Associate Minister of Commerce who had overseen the passage of the Building Act 2004, would be named Building Minister; however, he resigned from Cabinet in October 2004 and Commerce Minister Margaret Wilson was named the inaugural Minister of Building Issues instead.

The portfolio was renamed Minister of Building and Construction in 2007. In 2014, it was amalgamated with the housing portfolio (as Minister of Building and Housing); this was reversed in 2016 with housing responsibility now sitting with the Minister for Social Housing.

== List of ministers ==
Key

National Labour

No.	Name	Portrait	Term of office		Prime Minister
As Minister of Building Issues
1	Margaret Wilson		1 November 2004	21 December 2004	Clark
2	Chris Carter		21 December 2004	19 October 2005	Clark
3	Clayton Cosgrove		19 November 2005	5 November 2007	Clark
As Minister for Building and Construction
4	Shane Jones		5 November 2007	19 November 2008	Clark
5	Maurice Williamson		19 November 2008	1 May 2014	Key
6	Nick Smith (Note: as Minister for Building and Housing (8 October 2014 to 20 December 2016))		1 May 2014	26 October 2017	Key
6	Nick Smith		1 May 2014	26 October 2017	English
7	Jenny Salesa		26 October 2017	6 November 2020	Ardern
8	Poto Williams		6 November 2020	14 June 2022	Ardern
9	Megan Woods		14 June 2022	27 November 2023	Ardern
9	Megan Woods		14 June 2022	27 November 2023	Hipkins
10	Chris Penk		27 November 2023	13 August 2026	Luxon
11	Simon Watts		13 August 2026	Incumbent	Luxon

Table footnotes:
