= Invest New Zealand =

New Zealand foreign investment agency

Invest New Zealand is an autonomous Crown entity created by the New Zealand Government to boost productivity and innovation in 2025. The unit was initially established as a unit within the New Zealand Trade and Enterprise organisation before becoming a separate Crown entity on 1 July 2025.

== Functions and mandate ==
Invest New Zealand is one of the two designated government agencies alongside New Zealand Trade and Enterprise (NZTE) tasked with boosting economic growth through international trade and investment. Invest New Zealand will be responsible for facilitating foreign direct investment with the exception of public infrastructure, which falls under the responsibility of National Infrastructure Funding and Financing. The agency will be tasked with working with multi-national companies and foreign investors to attract people, businesses and capital into the New Zealand economy. Invest NZ will also focus on investing in science, innovation and technology that contributes to economic development.

The Invest New Zealand Bill is the proposed regulatory framework for the agency.

== History ==
On 23 January 2025, Prime Minister Christopher Luxon announced during his state of the nation speech that the Government would create a new foreign investment agency to boost New Zealand. That same month, Invest New Zealand was established as a unit within NZTE with plans to transition it into a separate autonomous Crown entity.

On 1 July 2025, Invest New Zealand became an autonomous Crown entity. In early December 2025, Trade and Investment Minister Todd McClay appointed Invest NZ's inaugural board members. Rob Morrison was appointed as chair and Carmel Fisher as deputy chair. Other board members included David Tapsell, Richard Headley, Mary MacLeod and Ross George.

On 6 August, Invest New Zealand cancelled its Golden Visa roadshows in Europe and North America, and laid off its US and European-based staff members.
