= Pylat =

Pylat or PYLAT may refer to:

- Pacific Youth Leadership and Transformation Trust (PYLAT)
- Pylat bird from Star Wars
- Volodymyr Pylat, creator of Combat Hopak, Ukrainan martial arts

== See also ==
- Pilat
