= Crown entity =

Organisation in New Zealand's state sector

A Crown entity (from the Commonwealth term Crown) is an organisation that forms part of New Zealand's state sector established under the Crown Entities Act 2004, a unique umbrella governance and accountability statute. The Crown Entities Act is based on the corporate model where the governance of the organisation is split from the management of the organisation.

== Types of crown entities ==
Crown entities come under the following types:

- Statutory entities – bodies corporate established under an Act
  - Crown agents – organisations that give effect to government policy, such as the Accident Compensation Corporation, which administers no-fault workers compensation
  - Autonomous Crown entities (ACE), which must have regard to government policy, such as Te Papa, the national museum
  - Independent Crown entities (ICE), which are generally independent of government policy, such as the Commerce Commission, which enforces legislation promoting competition
- Crown entity companies – registered companies wholly owned by the Crown, including Crown Research Institutes (CRIs) and a small number of other companies
- Crown entity subsidiaries – companies that are subsidiaries of Crown entities
- School boards of trustees
- Tertiary education institutions, including universities, colleges of education, polytechnics, and wānanga

Crown entities can be contrasted with other New Zealand public sector organisational forms: departments of state, state-owned enterprises, offices of Parliament and sui generis organisations like the Reserve Bank.

== Crown entities, responsible ministers and monitoring departments ==
Under the Crown Entities Act, ministers are required to "oversee and manage" the Crown's interests in the Crown entities within their portfolio (sections 27 and 88). The board of the entity has the key role in ensuring the entity is achieving results within budget. This is done by a monitoring department on behalf of the minister unless other arrangements for monitoring are made. Monitoring departments make explicit agreements with their minister, setting out what monitoring they will undertake and how they will do it. Crown entity boards should also facilitate clear and transparent monitoring, for example, by providing the minister and monitoring department with good information on which to make judgements about performance.

This table is based on one from the State Services Commission.

Responsible minister(s)	Crown entities	Monitoring department(s)	Category / type	Empowering legislation
ACC	Accident Compensation Corporation	Labour	Crown agent	Injury Prevention, Rehabilitation, and Compensation Act 2001 (Part 7/Sched 5)
Arts, Culture and Heritage	Arts Council of New Zealand Toi Aotearoa	Culture and Heritage	ACE	Arts Council of New Zealand Toi Aotearoa Act 1994 (Part 1)
Arts, Culture and Heritage	Museum of New Zealand Te Papa Tongarewa	Culture and Heritage	ACE	Museum of New Zealand Te Papa Tongarewa Act 1992 (Part 1 and Schedule 1)
Arts, Culture and Heritage	New Zealand Film Commission	Culture and Heritage	ACE	New Zealand Film Commission Act 1978
Arts, Culture and Heritage	Heritage New Zealand (Pouhere Taonga)	Culture and Heritage	ACE	Heritage New Zealand Pouhere Taonga Act 2014
Arts, Culture and Heritage	New Zealand Symphony Orchestra	Culture and Heritage	ACE	New Zealand Symphony Orchestra Act 2004 (Part 2 and Schedule 1)
Broadcasting	Broadcasting Commission (New Zealand On Air)	Culture and Heritage	ACE	Broadcasting Act 1989 (Part 4 and Schedule 1)
Broadcasting	Broadcasting Standards Authority	Culture and Heritage	ICE	Broadcasting Act 1989 (Part 3 and Schedule 1)
Broadcasting and Finance (2)	Radio New Zealand Limited	CCMAU / Culture and Heritage and Treasury	CEC	Radio New Zealand Act 1995
Broadcasting and Finance (2)	Television New Zealand Limited	CCMAU / Culture and Heritage and Treasury	CEC	Television New Zealand Act 2003
Commerce	Accounting Standards Review Board	Economic Development	ICE	Financial Reporting Act 1993 (Part 3 and Schedule 1)
Commerce	Commerce Commission	Economic Development	ICE	Commerce Act 1986 (Part 1)
Commerce	Securities Commission	Economic Development	ICE	Securities Act 1978 (Part 1)
Commerce	Standards Council	Economic Development	ACE	Standards Act 1988
Commerce	Takeovers Panel	Economic Development	ICE	Takeovers Act 1993 (Part 1 and Schedule)
Commerce	Testing Laboratory Registration Council	Economic Development	ACE	Testing Laboratory Registration Act 1972
Community and Voluntary Sector	Charities Services	Internal Affairs	ACE	Charities Act 2005 (Part 1)
CRIs and Finance (2)	Crown research institutes (9)	CCMAU and Treasury	CEC	Crown Research Institutes Act 1992
Economic Development and Finance (2)	New Zealand Venture Investment Fund Limited	CCMAU and Treasury	CEC	None (company constitution)
Education	New Zealand Qualifications Authority	Education	Crown agent	Education Act 1989 (Part 20)
Education	New Zealand Teachers Council	Education	ACE	Education Act 1989 (Part 10A)
Education	School boards of trustees (2,474)	Education	School BoTs	Education Act 1989 (Parts 7, 7A, 8, 9 and 12 and Schedules 5A and 6)
Emergency	Natural Hazards Commission (Toka Tū Ake)	Emergency	Crown agent	Natural Hazards Insurance Act
Energy	Electricity Authority	Economic Development	Crown agent	Electricity Act 1992 (Part 15)
Energy	Energy Efficiency and Conservation Authority	Environment	Crown agent	Energy Efficiency and Conservation Act 2000 (and Schedule)
Environment	Environmental Protection Authority	Environment	ACE	Environmental Protection Authority Act 2011 (the EPA Act)
Finance	Earthquake Commission (Natural Hazards Commission)	Treasury	Crown agent	Earthquake Commission Act 1993 (Part 1 and Schedule 1)
Finance	Government Superannuation Fund Authority	Treasury	ACE	Government Superannuation Fund Act 1956 (Part 1 and Schedule 4)
Finance	Guardians of New Zealand Superannuation	Treasury	ACE	New Zealand Superannuation and Retirement Income Act 2001 (Part 2 and Schedule 3)
Finance	New Zealand Productivity Commission	Treasury	ICE	New Zealand Productivity Commission Act, 2010
Foreign Affairs	New Zealand Antarctic Institute	Foreign Affairs and Trade	Crown agent	New Zealand Antarctic Institute Act 1996 (Part 1 and Schedule 1)
Health	Alcohol Advisory Council of New Zealand	Health	ACE	Alcohol Advisory Council Act 1976
Health	Crown Health Financing Agency	Health	Crown agent	New Zealand Public Health and Disability Act 2000 (Part 4 and Schedule 6)
Health	Health New Zealand - Te Whatu Ora	Health	Crown agent	Pae Ora (Healthy Futures) Act 2022 (Part 2)
Health	Health and Disability Commissioner	Health	ICE	Health and Disability Commissioner Act 1994 (Part 1 and Schedule 2)
Health	Health Research Council of New Zealand	Health	Crown agent	Health Research Council Act 1990 (Part 1 and Schedule 1)
Health	Health Sponsorship Council	Health	Crown agent	Smoke-free Environments Act 1990 (Part 3)
Mental Health	Te Hiringa Mahara (formerly the Mental Health and Wellbeing Commission)	Health	ICE	Mental Health and Wellbeing Commission Act 2020 (Part 2)
Health	New Zealand Blood Service	Health	Crown agent	New Zealand Public Health and Disability Act 2000 (Part 4 and Schedule 6)
Health	Pharmaceutical Management Agency (Pharmac)	Health	Crown agent	New Zealand Public Health and Disability Act 2000 (Part 4 and Schedule 6)
Health	Taumata Arowai (Water Services Regulator)	Health/environment	Crown agent	Taumata Arowai - Water Services Regulator Act 2020, Water Services Act 2021
Health	Te Whatu Ora (Health New Zealand)	Health	Crown agent	Pae Ora (Healthy Futures) Act 2022
Housing and Finance (2)	Kāinga Ora – Homes and Communities	Building and Housing / Treasury	Crown agent	Housing Corporation Act 1974 (Part 1 and Schedule 1A)
Industry and Regional Development, and Trade (2)	New Zealand Trade and Enterprise	Economic Development, and Foreign Affairs and Trade	Crown agent	New Zealand Trade and Enterprise Act 2003 (Part 2)
Internal Affairs	Fire and Emergency New Zealand (FENZ)	Internal Affairs	Crown agent	Fire and Emergency New Zealand Act 2017 (Part 1)
Internal Affairs	New Zealand Lotteries Commission	CCMAU	ACE	Gambling Act 2003 (Part 3, Subpart 2, and Schedule 4)
Internal Affairs	Office of Film and Literature Classification	Internal Affairs	ICE	Films, Videos, and Publications Classification Act 1993 (Part 6 and Schedule 1)
Justice	Electoral Commission	Justice	ICE	Electoral Act 1993 (Part 1 and Schedule 1)
Justice	Human Rights Commission (New Zealand)	Justice	ICE	Human Rights Act 1993 (Part 1 and Schedule 1)
Justice	Independent Police Conduct Authority	Justice	ICE	Independent Police Complaints Authority Act 1988
Justice	Privacy Commissioner	Justice	ICE	Privacy Act 2020 (Part 2)
Justice	Real Estate Authority	Justice	Crown agent	Real Estate Agents Act 2008 (Part 2)
Justice	Law Commission	Justice	ICE	Law Commission Act 1985 (and Schedule 1)
Maori Affairs	Te Reo Whakapuaki Irirangi (Te Mangai Paho)	TPK (Maori Development)	ACE	Broadcasting Act 1989 (Part 4A and Schedule 1)
Maori Affairs	Te Taura Whiri I te Reo Maori (Maori Language Commission)	TPK (Maori Development))	ACE	Maori Language Act 1987 (and Schedule 2)
Public Trust and Finance (2)	Public Trust	CCMAU / Justice and Treasury	ACE	Public Trust Act 2001 (Part 2)
Research, Science and Technology	Foundation for Research, Science and Technology	MoRST	Crown agent	Foundation for Research, Science and Technology Act 1990 (and Schedule 1)
Social Development and Employment	Children's Commissioner	Social Development	ICE	Children's Commissioner Act 2003 (and Schedule 1)
Social Development and Employment	Social Policy Evaluation and Research Unit (Superu)	Social Development	ACE	Families Commission Act 2003 (Part 1), Families Commission Amendment Act 2014
Social Development and Employment	New Zealand Artificial Limb Board	Social Development	ACE	Social Welfare (Transitional Provisions) Act 1990 (Part 3 and Schedule 3)
Social Development and Employment	Retirement Commissioner	Social Development	ACE	New Zealand Superannuation and Retirement Income Act 2001 (Part 4 and Schedule 6)
Social Development and Employment	Social Workers Registration Board	Social Development	Crown agent	Social Workers Registration Act 2003 (Part 6 and Schedule 1)
Sport and Recreation	Drug Free Sport New Zealand	Culture and Heritage	ICE	Sports Anti-Doping Act 2006 (Part 2)
Sport and Recreation	Sport and Recreation New Zealand	Culture and Heritage	Crown agent	Sport and Recreation New Zealand Act 2002 (Part 2)
Tertiary Education	Tertiary Education Commission	Education	Crown agent	Education Act 1989 (Part 13A)
Tertiary Education	Tertiary education institutions (33)	Education	TEIs	Education Act 1989 (Parts 14 and 15 and Schedule 13A)
Tourism	New Zealand Tourism Board	Economic Development	Crown agent	New Zealand Tourism Board Act 1991 (Part 1 and Schedule 1)
Transport	Civil Aviation Authority of New Zealand	Transport	Crown agent	Civil Aviation Act 1990 (Part 6A and Schedule 3)
Transport	New Zealand Transport Agency Waka Kotahi	Transport	Crown agent	Land Transport Management Amendment Act 2008 (Part 4)
Transport	Maritime New Zealand	Transport	Crown agent	Maritime Transport Act 1994 (Part 29 and Schedule 1)
Transport	Transport Accident Investigation Commission	Transport	ICE	Transport Accident Investigation Commission Act 1990 (Part 2 and Schedule)

Abbreviations used:

- ACE = autonomous Crown entity
- CCMAU = Crown Company Monitoring Advisory Unit
- CEC = Crown entity company
- CRIs = Crown research institutes (all CECs)
- ICE = independent Crown entity
- TPK = Te Puni Kokiri (Ministry of Maori Development)
- MoRST = Ministry of Research, Science and Technology
- TEIs = tertiary education institutions
- School BoTs = school boards of trustees

== See also ==
- List of public sector organisations in New Zealand
- Public Service Commission (New Zealand)
- Regulatory agency
- Statutory body
- Statutory corporation
- Te Arawhiti
- Crown corporations of Canada
