= Ministry of Research, Science and Technology (New Zealand) =

- Te Manatū Pūtaiao
- Logo of the Ministry of Research, Science and Technology

Agency overview
- Dissolved: 2011
- Superseding agency: Ministry of Science and Innovation
- Website: www.morst.govt.nz

The Ministry of Research, Science and Technology (Māori: Te Manatū Pūtaiao) was a government agency within the New Zealand government.

== Mandate and functions ==
Its main responsibilities were to:

- Manage the Government's research, science and technology (RS&T) investment
- Provide policy advice on RS&T issues
- Encourage innovation and commercialisation of scientific and technological knowledge and ideas
- Collaborate with other government organisations where RS&T intersects with their work.

== History ==
The role of Chief Scientist for the Ministry was held by Don McGregor between 1992 and 1997. Initiatives through his tenure included a landmark assessment of the value of science in supporting land management in New Zealand.

In 2011 the Ministry of Research, Science and Technology (MoRST) was merged with the Foundation for Research, Science and Technology to create the new Ministry of Science and Innovation (MSI), which took over the policy and investment functions of both agencies. MSI became fully operational on 1 February 2011, at which point MoRST and the Foundation for Research, Science and Technology were disestablished. MSI was then subsequently merged with other ministries into the Ministry of Business, Innovation and Employment (MBIE).
