= Ministry of Science and Innovation (New Zealand) =

- Māori: Te Pūnaha Hiringa Whakaea

Agency overview
- Formed: 2011
- Preceding agencies: Ministry of Research, Science and Technology; Foundation for Research, Science and Technology
- Dissolved: 2012
- Superseding agency: Ministry of Business, Innovation and Employment
- Annual budget: NZ$19,660,000
- Minister responsible: Minister of Science and Innovation
- Agency executive: Murray Bain, Chief Executive
- Website: www.msi.govt.nz

The Ministry of Science and Innovation (MSI; Māori: Te Pūnaha Hiringa Whakaea) was a government agency within the New Zealand Government, dealing with the science and innovation sector in New Zealand.

== History ==
The Ministry became operational on 1 February 2011, bringing together and replacing the Foundation for Research, Science and Technology and the Ministry of Research, Science and Technology. MSI assumed responsibility for the science and innovation policy and investment functions of both agencies.

In March 2012, Prime Minister John Key announced that the Ministry of Science and Innovation would be integrated into a new Ministry of Business, Innovation and Employment, comprising the Ministry of Economic Development, the Department of Labour, the Ministry of Science and Innovation and the Department of Building and Housing. The new Ministry began operating on 1 July 2012.

== Functions ==
Its key roles and functions included:

- advising the government on New Zealand's science and innovation system
- overseeing the Government's investment in science and innovation, and in infrastructure that supports science and innovation
- fostering commercialisation and the transfer of knowledge into technology, processes and products; enhancing productivity; and, through the application of research results and innovative effort, achieving wider benefits for New Zealand.
