= Don McGregor (scientist) =

New Zealand scientist (1938–2020)

Donald Dalglish McGregor (15 October 1938 – 17 September 2020) was a New Zealand scientist and research advisor.

== Early life and education ==
McGregor was born and raised in Christchurch to Roy and Elsie (née Hall). He married Marjorie (née Mauger) in Timaru on Easter Monday, 1966. After having completed an MSc with first Class Honours at the University of Canterbury, he arrived in Dunedin in 1962 to work as a Research Officer in the Wellcome Medical Research Institute at the University of Otago, where he obtained his PhD in 1969.

His early work focused on the vascular system and the alleviation of hypertension producing at least one classic paper (McGregor and Smirk, 1970) that was so well-regarded it was re-visited nearly four decades later. He also had a keen interest in mosquitoes, in particular Opifex fuscus (Naeroa) endemic around the New Zealand coast.

The majority of his academic career was spent at the University of Otago. Despite his education in the medical school, he commenced a lecturing position in the Department of Zoology in 1968. He eventually progressed to a term as Head of the Department of Zoology (1980–1985), and as Dean of the Faculty of Science (1986–1988). By 1991 McGregor was Assistant Vice-Chancellor leading the newly created Division of Sciences.

== Science adviser ==
McGregor was appointed chief scientist at the Ministry of Research, Science and Technology (MoRST) in 1992. He set up and managed the expert science panels established to inform government policies on bovine spongiform encephalopathy, the incursion and eradication of tussock moth as well as possum-spreading of bovine tuberculosis.
