= Ministry of Housing and Urban Development =

New Zealand government ministry

- Māori: Te Tūāpapa Kura Kāinga

Agency overview
- Formed: 1 October 2018
- Dissolved: 1 July 2026
- Superseding agency: Ministry for Cities, Environment, Regions and Transport (MCERT)
- Jurisdiction: New Zealand
- Annual budget: Vote Housing and Urban Development; Total budget for 2019/20 ▲$2,228,080,000
- Ministers responsible: Hon Chris Bishop, Minister of Housing; Hon Tama Potaka, Associate Minister of Housing (Social Housing)
- Agency executive: Andrew Crisp, Chief Executive
- Website: Ministry of Housing and Urban Development

The Ministry of Housing and Urban Development (HUD; Māori: Te Tūāpapa Kura Kāinga) was a cabinet-level public service department responsible for overseeing the New Zealand Government's housing and urban development programme. It formally came into existence on 1 October 2018 and assumed the housing policy, funding and regulatory functions of the Ministry of Business, Innovation and Employment (MBIE), the Ministry of Social Development (MSD), and the New Zealand Treasury. It was headed by the Minister of Housing Chris Bishop. On 1 July 2026, the Ministry was amalgamated into the Ministry for Cities, Environment, Regions and Transport (MCERT).

== History ==
On 8 June 2018, Housing Minister Phil Twyford announced the creation of the Ministry of Housing and Urban Development to coordinate the New Zealand Government's efforts to combat the country's housing shortage and to facilitate the provision of affordable social housing. The new ministry was established on 1 August and commenced operating on 1 October 2018. While Twyford argued that the new ministry would "restore the basic right to healthy, affordable housing for all New Zealanders", the opposition National Party Housing Spokesperson Judith Collins and housing lobby group the Property Institute's Chief Executive Ashley Church questioned its effectiveness.

In mid-January, the Head of KiwiBuild Stephen Barclay resigned following a disagreement with Twyford over transferring oversight of the building programme from the Ministry of Business, Innovation and Employment to Housing and Urban and Development. Later reports indicated that staff, advisers, and contractors were dissatisfied with Barclay's management style and leadership. In response, Barclay announced that he was filing a "constructive dismissal case" against the Ministry alleging they had breached his privacy. This development accompanied the Housing Minister's acknowledgement that the Government was unable to deliver on its target of building 1,000 homes by 1 July 2019.

Following a cabinet reshuffle in late June 2019, the Housing and Urban Development ministry was split into two separate portfolios. Megan Woods became Minister of Housing while Twyford was demoted to Minister of Urban Development. This new division of labour came in response to the failure of the Labour-led coalition government's flagship KiwiBuild scheme. Kris Faafoi was appointed as Associate Minister of Housing with responsibility for urban housing while Nanaia Mahuta was appointed Associate Minister of Housing with responsibility for Māori housing.

Following a later reshuffle following the 2020 election and the resignation of Kris Faafoi from Parliament, Megan Woods remained as Minister Housing however Willie Jackson took over as Associate Minister of Housing with responsibility for Māori housing as Barbara Edmonds was appointed Associate Minister of Housing with responsibility for Public Housing along with Green Party co-leader Marama Davidson as Associate Minister of Housing with responsibility for Homelessness

On 1 July 2026, the Ministry was amalgamated into a new mega ministry called the Ministry for Cities, Environment, Regions and Transport (MCERT), which assumed its housing and urban development functions.

== Functions ==
The Ministry of Housing and Urban Development is responsible for advising and delivering the Government's housing and urban development programme. Key priorities include addressing homelessness, increasing public and private housing supply, promoting healthier and warmer homes, making housing more affordable to rent and to buy, and supporting quality urban development and thriving communities.

HUD consolidates a range of housing policy, funding, and regulatory functions from the following government departments:

- The Ministry of Business, Innovation and Employment: housing and urban policy, KiwiBuild, the Community Housing Regulatory Authority and administration of funding for HomeStart, Welcome Home Loans, the legacy Social Housing Fund, and Community Group Housing.
- The Ministry of Social Development: public housing purchasing, homelessness policy and response, and emergency, transitional and public housing policy.
- The Treasury: monitoring of Housing New Zealand and the Tamaki Redevelopment Company.

The HUD is in charge of the Government's KiwiBuild scheme project. It also works closely with MBIE, MSD, the Treasury, Te Puni Kōkiri (Ministry of Māori Development), Housing New Zealand, and Corrections New Zealand.

== Leadership and structure ==
HUD comes under the oversight of Housing Minister, Associate Minister of Housing (Social Housing) Tama Potaka. The HUD's leadership team consists of Chief Executive Andrew Crisp, Deputy Chief Executive - Intelligence and System Direction Stephanie Rowe, Deputy Chief Executive, Tumuaki - Te Kāhui Māori Housing Kararaina Calcott-Cribb, Deputy Chief Executive – System Delivery and Performance Ben Dalton, Deputy Chief Executive - Solutions Design and Implementation Anne Shaw, Deputy Chief Executive - Organisational Performance Brad Ward, and Director - Office of the Chief Executive Jo Hogg .

== Ministers ==
The Ministry supports currently supports one ministerial portfolio and one associate minister.

Officeholder	Portfolios	Other responsibilities
Hon Chris Bishop	Minister of Housing	
Hon Tama Potaka		Associate Minister of Housing (Social Housing)
