= Te Hiringa Mahara =

New Zealand government entity

- Mental Health and Wellbeing Commission

Agency overview
- Formed: February 2021
- Preceding agency: Mental Health functions of the Health and Disability Commissioner, including the role of Mental Health Commissioner
- Jurisdiction: New Zealand
- Minister responsible: Minister of Health
- Agency executives: Karen Orsborn, Chief Executive; Hayden Wano, Board chair
- Parent agency: Ministry of Health
- Website: www.mhwc.govt.nz

Te Hiringa Mahara, formerly known as the Mental Health and Wellbeing Commission, is a New Zealand independent Crown entity that opened on 9 February 2021 which focuses on promoting mental health and wellbeing as well as providing leadership to the sector. It was established by the Sixth Labour Government with the passage of the Mental Health and Wellbeing Commission Act 2020.

Te Hiringa Mahara was created after a 2018 inquiry into mental health and addiction in New Zealand recommended the establishment of a Commission to provide oversight and monitoring of the mental health sector. The findings of this inquiry, including the recommendations around the establishment of the Commission, were detailed in the report He Ara Oranga. In December 2020, Minister of Health Andrew Little announced Hayden Wano as chair of the Commission's board; other board members as of March 2026 are Professor Sunny Collings, Dr Barbara Disley, Rae Lamb, Tuari Potiki, Wayne Langford and Josiah Tualamali'i. Former board members include Kevin Hague, Taimi Allan, and Alexander El Amanni

The roles and duties of Te Hiringa Mahara, as set out in the Mental Health and Wellbeing Commission Act 2020, are to:

1. Assess and report on the wellbeing and mental health of people in New Zealand, as well as what affects people’s health in those regards.
2. Analysis and publish findings on the adequacy of how people approach mental health and wellbeing in New Zealand, as well as how that can be improved for greater effectiveness.
3. Monitor and advocate for improvements to mental health and addiction services in New Zealand at a national level. This was previously work done by the Office of the Health and Disability Commissioner.
4. Promote cross-agency alignment and connection for entities involved with mental health and wellbeing.
5. Support communities with histories of distress or addiction.

Te Hiringa Mahara has released a series of reports based on their duties. A recent collection of small reports focused on COVID-19 effects.

Te Hiringa Mahara is not in charge of responding to individual or whānau experiences of mental health or addiction services. Handling complaints is still the domain of the Office of the Health and Disability Commissioner (HDC).

== Formation ==
Mental health in New Zealand tends to follow the trends of mental health in other developed countries. While the suicide rate is comparable with similar countries, the youth suicide rate is much higher. In the mid-1990s, the suicide rate for people aged 15–34 was over 25 per 100,000. By 2015 the rate had fallen to 16.9 per 100,000, still high compared to similar nations. Many social issues, including child poverty and employment, are among the contributing factors to high rates of suicide.

New Zealand’s first Mental Health Commission was established by the Fourth National Government through the Mental Health Commission Act 1998. Over time, the Commission's powers, scope, and funding were substantially reduced. It was disestablished in 2012, with the position of Mental Health Commissioner subsumed into the Office of the Health and Disability Commissioner.

Establishing a new Mental Health and Wellbeing Commission was one of the recommendations of He Ara Oranga: Report of the Government Inquiry into Mental Health and Addiction, which was established in January 2018 to review the mental health system and recommend specific changes to improve New Zealand’s approach to mental health. The report was presented to the Government by the Inquiry Panel in November 2018.

The Mental Health and Wellbeing Commission was established by the Mental Health and Wellbeing Commission Act 2020, all parties comprising the 52nd New Zealand Parliament supported the introduction of the Legislation, and it was passed into law in June 2020.

The Commission operates as an Independent Crown entity, independent of government policy but with Ministerial oversight. The Commission provides system-level oversight of mental health and well-being in New Zealand.

In December 2020, the Chair and members of the Board were announced by the Minister of Health, Andrew Little. Appointments were made in accordance with the Crown Entities Act 2004.

== Functions ==
The stated main function of the Mental Health and Wellbeing Commission is to assess, monitor and report on the mental health and well-being of the New Zealand people. They are also required to make recommendations on how mental health and addiction services can be improved. The Commission has two main frameworks: He Ara Āwhina and He Ara Oranga. The use of these particular frameworks allows for a focus on the experience and outcome of Maori by maintaining the principles of the Treaty of Waitangi.

The He Ara Āwhina (pathways to support) framework was developed by the Initial Mental Health and Wellbeing Commission. The final version was published on June 30th 2022. The main intention of this framework was to find out what an ideal system would look like, and then use this criterion to assess and monitor services. There are two main perspectives highlighted in this framework which are Te Ao Māori (created by Māori for Māori) and shared (for everyone). Alongside this framework are two other groups that were established to provide advice and further oversight on methods, measures, data sources and data gaps. These groups are the Expert Advisory Group (EAG) and the Technical Advisory Network (TAN).

He Ara Oranga's well-being outcomes framework is very similar to He Ara Āwhina, with the same main goals and values. The only notable difference is that He Ara Oranga focuses more on measuring the well-being of New Zealanders. The two perspectives previously mentioned also apply here. These two frameworks were created to work in partnership, as it is argued that well-being requires a collaborative approach. This framework was also specifically designed to reflect He Ara Oranga, the Government Inquiry into Mental Health and Addiction.

Te Hiringa Mahara’s full title is Te Hiringa Mahara - Te hinengaro tūmata tōrunga pai o te whakaaro nui. Te Hiringa Mahara on its own is Maori for "positive energy and thoughtfulness". The full title of Te Hiringa Mahara - Te hinengaro tūmata tōrunga pai o te whakaaro nui, means "igniting minds through positive energy and thoughtfulness". Te Hiringa Mahara was previously known as the Mental Health and Wellbeing Commission. The current name was officially unveiled at a ceremony in Te Whanganui-a-Tara Wellington on the 5th of July 2022.

Te Hiringa Mahara’s Board Head Hayden Wano stated that the name change was done to reflect Te Hiringa Mahara’s principles and its obligations under Te Tiriti o Waitangi, by showing Te Hiringa Mahara’s goal as the kaitiaki of mental health and wellbeing in New Zealand.

== Reports ==
=== Te Rau Tira Wellbeing Outcomes Report 2021 ===
On December 8th, 2021, the Mental Health Commission released its first report on wellbeing outcomes. This report details wellbeing results from a Māori perspective and a shared perspective that encompasses both Māori and non-Māori; the He Ara Oranga Wellbeing Outcomes Framework is used to advise the report. Te Kupenga, the General Social Survey, and the national health survey were used to develop the data indicators. Data indicators covered safety, health, financial security, discrimination, and culture. The Commission concluded that most people in New Zealand have positive wellbeing; however, specific marginalised communities are experiencing worse wellbeing outcomes.

According to the report, wellbeing from the Māori perspective showed multiple positive movements in economic growth, health, and life satisfaction. From 2013 to 2018, the Māori economy experienced a 60% growth, with an increase in the value of settlement assets. Notably, 77% of Māori rated their physical health highly, and an overall improvement in life expectancy is seen. Māori adults generally felt satisfied with life, with an average life satisfaction rating of 7.8 out of 10. Also, many reported feeling in control of their lives. However, mental health was lower for youth, with only 49% describing good wellbeing. Furthermore, 53 % reported experiencing depression symptoms, and 45% reported suicidal thoughts in the past year. For the Commission, young Māori's mental health and educational experiences remained a concern.

From a shared perspective, the wellbeing outcomes were primarily positive, but there was more variation between different communities. For instance, 66% of participants reported high levels of trust, whereas Māori and Pacific people had lower trust levels. Most adults reported good health (87%) and positive mental wellbeing (78%); however, people from marginalised groups were likelier to rate lower levels, such as the LGBT community, disabled people, and prisoners. For the general population, youth showed increased psychological distress, with 32% of young people feeling they did not receive adequate support during a difficult time.

The report findings prompted the Commission to create goals to improve wellbeing in New Zealand. These include advocating for disadvantaged groups, higher-quality and timely data indicators, and implementing the government's mental health pathway to benefit all communities.

=== Te Huringa: Change and Transformation ===
In 2022, the New Zealand Mental Health and Wellbeing Commission published the mental health services and addiction services report, Te Huringa: Change and Transformation. This monitoring report was the first of its kind and was a reconstructed model of the previous Mental Health Commissioner’s framework. It was a transitional report intended as a temporary substitute for the He Ara Āwhina (Pathways to Support, a monitoring framework that is currently in the process of development. The Commission' stated desires were to see advancements in the provision of services for addiction and mental health in order to transform the system in the direction of He Ara Oranga’s vision.

Between 2016 and 2017 and 2020 to 2021, Te Huringa evaluated and provided transparency on how well mental health and addictions programmes were performing. It was found that there was an increased demand for more government intervention in terms of transforming the mental health and addiction system funded by the public health system post-pandemic. These encompassed both primary mental health services and addiction services as well as specialised mental health and addiction services.

The report claimed that there had not been much proof of service improvement in the last five years, and the strain on specialised services was an area that requires more attention. Additionally, wait times for mental health services had not diminished, while those for addiction services had increased, despite the substantial investment of $883 million in addiction and mental health services. The findings of this report were considered with most of the Commission’s previous research, with a specific lens on the necessity to prioritise marginalised groups such as Māori, Pasifika, and youth in the workforce and services development. The measures in this report mostly pertained to services, especially specialised mental health services, where there hadn't been a lot of necessary investment.

=== Access and Choice Programme Report 2022 ===
The Access and Choice Programme is one of the 2019 Wellbeing Budget's major initiatives, and $664 million has been set aside for its implementation over a five-year period, from 2019 to 2024. The programme set aside $48.15 million for system enablers, $99.7 million for workforce development, and $516.4 million for four new service categories (Kaupapa Māori, Pacific, Integrated Primary Mental Health and Addiction (IPMHA), and Youth Services). An update on the Access and Choice program's implementation through to June 30, 2022 was provided in a 2022 report.

17 additional Kaupapa Māori services were noted to have been established, totalling to 29 Kaupapa Māori services spread over 19 districts. Substantial workforce deficits in Pacific services were highlighted, and patient and session counts had not increased. Across 7 districts, there were 9 Pacific services. Kaupapa Māori, Pacific, and Youth services were used by 19,250 people in 2022, and 77,000 people are anticipated to use them by 30 June 2024.

In 18 out of 20 districts, there are 23 youth services. The report recommended that to guarantee that all young people in New Zealand have access to services, it was imperative that services be expanded in the remaining two districts.

Individuals who appear to be experiencing addiction, gambling harm, or substance abuse did not appear to be utilising IPMHA; therefore, the report claimed the way services are provided needed to be reviewed, preferably with the help of those who have firsthand experience. There were 364 IPMHA services spread out over 19 districts, and just under 50% of the population who are enrolled with a GP could access them.

== Controversy ==
A December 2023 New Zealand Herald article reported on five Te Hiringa Mahara employees who had left due to what they described as toxic workplace conditions.
