= KiwiBuild =

New Zealand government housing scheme

KiwiBuild logo.

KiwiBuild was a real estate development scheme pursued by the Sixth Labour Government of New Zealand. It began in 2018, with the aim of building 100,000 homes by 2028 to increase housing affordability in New Zealand. It came under the oversight of the Ministry of Housing and Urban Development and the Minister responsible was the Minister of Housing, Megan Woods.

== History ==
The KiwiBuild scheme was first announced as Labour Party policy in 2012 by then leader David Shearer. The policy survived as party policy under all his successors and was a prominent feature of Labour's 2014 election campaign.

After the 2017 general election, the Sixth Labour Government of New Zealand took office. Finance Minister Grant Robertson outlined a mini-budget on 14 December 2017 which allocated $2 billion of capital spending to KiwiBuild. Homes built under the programme are sold to first-home buyers and the cash is recycled into further housing developments.

In mid-January 2019, Housing Minister Phil Twyford acknowledged that the government would be able to build only 300 of the 1,000 KiwiBuild homes it had promised by 1 July 2019. That same month, it was reported that KiwiBuild's head Stephen Barclay had resigned following a dispute with Twyford over moving KiwiBuild from the Ministry of Business, Innovation and Employment (MBIE) to the new Ministry of Housing and Urban Development (HUD). Later reports claimed that Barclay had been the subject of complaints by staff over his leadership behaviour and treatment of others. In late January, Barclay filed a constructive dismissal case against HUD, claiming that the Ministry had breached his privacy. In August 2019, the Head of KiwiBuild Commercial, Helen O'Sullivan, also resigned, causing further disruption.

On 4 September 2019 a "reset" of the scheme was announced by new Housing Minister Megan Woods. Changes included the target of building 100,000 houses over 10 years being abandoned, the allocation of $400 million to support alternative home ownership schemes (such as rent-to-own), those buying studios and one-bedrooms units only having to commit to one year of ownership opposed to three, the 10% deposit requirement for a First Home Grant being lowered to 5%, allowing groups of more than three to combine their $10,000 First Home Grants together for a single joint deposit, and the amount developers receive after triggering the underwrite being lowered.

By September 2019, the scheme had produced only 258 homes, far below the set targets.

By October 2020 the scheme had produced around 600 homes, and by May 2021, this number had increased to 1,058. By December 2023, this number increased to 2,229.

== Eligibility ==
To be eligible to buy a KiwiBuild home, buyers must be New Zealand citizens, permanent or usual residents, earn less than the relevant annual income caps ($120,000 for singles, $180,000 for couples) and intend to live in and own the home for at least three years.

== Reaction ==
The scheme has attracted criticism around the income caps, with claims that they are too high for low-income buyers to be able to compete with those receiving higher incomes. Following the sale of the first KiwiBuild homes, then-Housing Minister Phil Twyford stated that the scheme was not targeted towards working poor and unemployed families, attracting criticism from aspiring home-owners and activists who argued that KiwiBuild will lead to increased speculation and gentrification.

== See also ==
- Housing in New Zealand
- New Zealand property bubble
