= Department of Building and Housing =

Defunct government department in New Zealand

Department of Building and Housing Te Tari Kaupapa Whare

Agency overview
- Formed: 2004
- Preceding agency: Ministry of Housing
- Dissolved: 2012
- Superseding agency: Ministry of Business, Innovation and Employment
- Jurisdiction: Building and housing sector in New Zealand

The Department of Building and Housing (Māori: Te Tari Kaupapa Whare) was a government agency within the New Zealand government. Established in 2004 out of the former Ministry of Housing, it was disestablished in 2012. The department's former functions are now incorporated within the Ministry of Business, Innovation and Employment and the Ministry of Housing and Urban Development.

== History ==
The Ministry of Housing was established in 1991 by the Fourth National Government as a policy advice agency alongside Housing New Zealand Corporation, which managed the state housing portfolio. The Ministry of Social Policy, later the Ministry of Social Development (MSD), gained a housing policy role in the late 1990s.

The Fifth Labour Government reviewed the housing sector in 2003 as part of its response to the leaky homes crisis. The following year, the Government announced plans to restructure government building and housing services. The new Department of Building and Housing was established, replacing the Ministry of Housing and picking up functions from the Ministry of Economic Development and the MSD (retirement village legislation) and the Department of Internal Affairs (swimming pool fencing regulation). The Building Industry Authority, which had been the sector's regulator, was also merged into this new department. The agency commenced operations in November 2004, following the passage of the Building Act 2004 that August. Its responsible ministers were the Minister of Housing and the Minister of Building Issues (later Minister for Building and Construction).

In March 2012, the Fifth National Government announced that the Department would be integrated into a new Ministry comprising the Ministry of Economic Development, the Department of Labour, Ministry of Science and Innovation and the Department of Building and Housing. The new Ministry of Business, Innovation and Employment (MBIE) began operating on 1 July 2012. Some building and housing functions were later transferred from MBIE to the Ministry of Housing and Urban Development in 2018.

== See also ==
- State housing in New Zealand
- Ministry of Business, Innovation and Employment
- Ministry of Housing and Urban Development
- Minister of Housing (New Zealand)
- Minister for Building and Construction (New Zealand)
