= Michael Hirschfeld =

New Zealand businessman and politician (1944–1999)

30th President of the Labour Party
- In office November 1995 – 5 January 1999
- Vice President: Terry Scott
- Leader: Helen Clark
- Preceded by: Maryan Street
- Succeeded by: Bob Harvey

Personal details
- Born: 27 October 1944 Wellington, New Zealand
- Died: 5 January 1999 (aged 54) Raumati, New Zealand
- Party: Labour
- Spouse: Vivien Flack
- Children: 3

Michael Avigdor Hirschfeld (27 October 1944 – 5 January 1999) was a New Zealand businessman, and was President of the New Zealand Labour Party from 1995 to 1999.

== Biography ==
=== Early life and career ===
He was born in Wellington; his parents had arrived from Palestine in 1940. His father Sigi Hirschfeld started the firm of Mico Wakefield, a plumbing, stainless steel and aluminium supply business. His grandparents were Austrian, and he was a 'secular Jew' and agnostic. He was initially educated in England before returning and attending Wellington College and Victoria University of Wellington, where he was active in the anti-Vietnam War movement. In his youth he had hopes of becoming a full-time actor. He then gained a master's degree at Victoria University. At university he was active in student politics and rose to become vice-president of the New Zealand University Students' Association, spearheading campaigns against New Zealand's involvement in the Vietnam conflict. Hirschfeld wrote his thesis for his degree on the performance of the second Labour government, but was unpublished. He conducted interviews with several cabinet ministers, including Sir Arnold Nordmeyer, and provided transcripts of the interviews as appendices.

He married Vivien Flack (whom he met while acting in a university production) in 1967, with whom he had two daughters and one son. Together with Vivien, he travelled briefly to Israel after the outbreak of the Six-Day War, before returning home to work for his family firm Mico Wakefield. From the 1980s to early 1990s he built the company up to a 450-staff organisation with a turnover of $160 million, before negotiating its sale to an Australian company in 1994. In the 1998 National Business Review rich list his personal worth at $20 million, a figure he did not dispute in a subsequent North & South article. His cousin was Yair Hirschfeld, one of the architects of the 1993 Oslo Accords, which set the Middle East peace process in motion.

While carving out an impressive business record, Hirschfeld spent much of his spare time working for other causes, he joined his parents Gisi and Sigi in backing the left-wing Unity Theatre and was a tireless supporter of professional theatre in Wellington. Hirschfeld was a member of the Victoria University Council. He had many company directorships and was a chairman of Amnesty International's Freedom Foundation, chairman of the Theatre Artists' Co-operative Trust, the Wellington Museum Trust, New Zealand Jews For Peace In The Middle East, the Associates Of City Art Gallery, the Shipping Corporation of New Zealand; deputy chairman of the Pacific Forum Line, New Zealand member of the Pacific Basin Economic Council; member of the building project committee of Te Papa, and founder of the New Zealand-Israel Trade Association. The Michael Hirschfeld Gallery on Wellington's Waterfront is named after him.

=== Labour Party ===
He first joined Labour in the 1960s and helped found Young Labour in 1967, but clashed with Labour Prime Minister Norman Kirk (who disliked academics) over the Vietnam conflict. In 1971, at the age of 27, he was elected to Labour's national executive, the youngest person ever to gain such high office. His involvement with the party lessened after he failed to be re-elected in 1972. His party activities waned significantly and it was not until he was shoulder-tapped to stand for party president in 1995 that he became more active, pledging to galvanise factions within Labour. His main objective was to build better relations with the Alliance and bring about ceasefire in what Hirschfeld once described as the "internecine war" between Labour and the Alliance. He was the one who encouraged Labour leader Helen Clark to speak at the 1998 Alliance conference. As a successful businessman Hirschfeld was also able to act as a link to the business sector, who were suspicious of Labour's supposed "anti-business" ideology, to raise funds and improve the party's image.

=== Death ===
He suffered from diabetes which led to total kidney failure in 1995, forcing him to add daily dialysis to a regime of insulin injections. His ill health was no secret and on his election as Labour president in November 1995, he announced if the opportunity for a kidney transplant were to arise, he would take it, no matter how inconvenient. He died in Waikanae Beach on 5 January 1999 after he had been admitted to hospital in late 1998.

== Works ==
- Hirschfeld, M. A. (1970). The New Zealand Labour Party in Office, 1957-60 (Thesis). Victoria University of Wellington.

Party political offices
Preceded by Maryan Street	President of the Labour Party; 1995–1999	Succeeded by Bob Harvey
