= Kāinga Ora =

New Zealand government agency for social housing

Kāinga Ora – Homes and Communities
- Kaporeihana ā-Whare (Māori)

Agency overview
- Formed: 1894 – State Advances Office; 1936 – State Advances Corporation; 1974 – Housing Corporation of New Zealand (HCNZ); 2001 – Housing New Zealand Corporation; 2018 – Housing New Zealand (HNZ); 2019 – Kāinga Ora – Homes and Communities
- Jurisdiction: New Zealand
- Headquarters: Level 5, 7 Waterloo Quay Wellington 6011, New Zealand
- Employees: 3305 (2023)
- Ministers responsible: Hon Chris Bishop, Minister of Housing; Hon Tama Potaka, Associate Minister of Housing (Social Housing)
- Agency executives: Simon Moutter, Board Chairperson; Matt Crockett, Chief Executive
- Website: www.kaingaora.govt.nz

Kāinga Ora (KO), officially Kāinga Ora – Homes and Communities, is a Crown agency that provides rental housing for New Zealanders in need. It has Crown entity status under the Kāinga Ora–Homes and Communities Act 2019.

On 1 October 2019 Kāinga Ora was formed by the merger of Housing New Zealand with its development subsidiary Homes, Land, Community (HLC) and the KiwiBuild Unit from the Ministry of Housing.

Kāinga Ora is a Crown entity with assets valued at approximately $45 billion and annual expenditure exceeding $2.5 billion. As New Zealand's largest landlord, it manages over 70,000 properties, primarily providing social housing to low-income populations.

== History ==
=== Origins ===
State housing in New Zealand dates from 1894 with the establishment of the State Advances Office.

In 1905, Prime Minister Richard Seddon introduced the Workers Dwellings Act 1905, introducing public housing to New Zealand. This Act made New Zealand the first nation in the Western world to provide public housing for its citizens. The scheme ultimately failed in 1906 when the workers could no longer afford to pay the high rents asked by the Government for the properties.

The first official state house was opened in 1937 at 12 Fife Lane in Miramar in Wellington.

=== Housing New Zealand, 1974-2019 ===
Housing Corporation of New Zealand was formed in 1974 through a merger of the State Advances Corporation (SAC) and the Housing Division of the Ministry of Works.

The Housing New Zealand Corporation in its current form is a statutory corporation that was established on 1 July 2001 under the Housing Corporation Act 1974, as amended by the Housing Corporation Amendment Act 2001. This was an amalgamation of Housing New Zealand Limited, Community Housing Limited, and the Ministry of Social Policy. In 2018 the Labour-led coalition government removed the word Corporation from the name and it was formally known as Housing New Zealand (HNZ).

=== Kāinga Ora, 2019–present ===
On 1 October 2019 the Labour-led government merged Housing New Zealand with its development subsidiary HLC and the KiwiBuild Unit from the Ministry of Housing and Urban Development to form a new Crown entity called Kāinga Ora – Homes and Communities.

Following the 2023 New Zealand general election, the incoming National-led coalition government announced that former Prime Minister Bill English, financial expert Simon Allen, and Ceinwein McNeil would be leading an independent review into the agency's financial situation, procurement, and asset management.

In May 2024, English's review into Kāinga Ora criticised the housing agency's excessive borrowing practices and leadership. On 20 May, Prime Minister Christopher Luxon and Housing Minister Bishop announced on a multi-year revamp of the agency including replacing the leadership board, realigning contractual arrangements across Kāinga Ora and community housing providers, simplifying the agency's directive and requiring the new leadership board to develop a plan to improve financial performance and reduce losses. Simon Moutter, the former chief executive of Powerco, Auckland International Airport and Spark New Zealand, was appointed Kāinga Ora's new board chair, effective 4 June 2024. On 21 May, Newshub reported that the Government would scrap Kāinga Ora's NZ$60 million first-home grant programme and redirect the money towards social housing as part of the 2024 Budget. On 1 July 2024, Kāinga Ora CEO Andrew McKenzie resigned due to disagreements with the Government's overhaul of the housing agency including reducing its scale and accountabilities.

On 25 September, Kāinga Ora announced a second round of job cuts, affecting 321 jobs. This was part of the National-led government's public sector job cuts in 2024.

== Responsibility ==
Housing New Zealand was the New Zealand Government's principal advisor on housing with its primary role as a provider and manager for housing, specialising in New Zealanders in need of housing assistance.

In 1986, The Residential Tenancies Act was passed and The Ministry of Housing was formed. This entity was responsible for government housing policy, managing the State Housing Appeals Authority, holding and managing Tenancy bond monies, providing tenancy advice (Tenancy Services), delivering mediations and administration of The Tenancy Tribunal.

In 2004 this role was transferred to the Department of Building and Housing, and then in 2012 it was again transferred to the Ministry of Business, Innovation and Employment. In 2019 the Ministry of Housing held the role.

In April 2014 the Ministry of Social Development took over the assessment of housing needs to determine who was entitled to social housing and their rent subsidy entitlement.

Kāinga Ora is one of New Zealand's largest providers of housing, owning and maintaining almost 69,000 properties housing approximately 200,000 people. It estimates the assets it is responsible for to be worth around 40 Billion dollars. It also maintains a focus on urban development, having delivered approximately 7,000 homes since its formation, and plans to deliver a further 40,000 in coming years.

Kāinga Ora works closely with both the Ministry of Social Development and the Ministry of Housing and Urban Development with Kāinga Ora's main responsibilities in relation to MSD and HUD being placing people from the Housing Register into homes, as well as delivering more public, transitional, and affordable housing.

== Management ==
=== Ministers responsible ===
The shareholding ministers of all Housing New Zealand subsidiaries are the Minister of Housing and the Minister of Finance.

The Minister of Housing/and Urban Development

- The Hon. Mark Gosche (2001–2003)
- The Hon. Steve Maharey (2003–2007)
- The Hon. Maryan Street (2007–2008)
- The Hon. Phil Heatley (2008–2013)
- The Hon. Nick Smith (2013–2014)
- The Hon. Paula Bennett (2014–2016)
- The Hon. Amy Adams (2016–2017)
- The Hon. Phil Twyford (2017–2019)
- The Hon. Megan Woods (2019–2023)
- The Hon. Chris Bishop (2023–present)

Associate Minister of Housing (Social Housing)

- The Hon. Kris Faafoi (2019–2020)
- The Hon. Poto Williams (2020–2022)
- The Hon. Tama Potaka (2023–present)

Associate Minister of Housing and Urban Development/Minister for Building and Construction

- The Hon. Jenny Salesa (2017–2019)

Associate Minister of Housing (Maori)

- The Hon. Nanaia Mahuta (2019–2020)
- The Hon. Peeni Henare (2020–2023)

Associate Minister of Housing (Homelessness)

- The Hon. Marama Davidson (2020–2023)

The Minister of Finance

- The Hon. Michael Cullen (2001–2008)
- The Rt. Hon. Bill English (2008–2016)
- The Hon. Steven Joyce (2016–2017)
- The Hon. Grant Robertson (2017–2023)
- The Hon. Nicola Willis (2023–present)

=== Board ===
Name	Position	Notes
Simon Moutter	Chairperson	
John Duncan	Deputy Chairperson	
Ngarimu Blair	Director	
Robin Hapi	Director	
Philippa Howden-Chapman	Director	
Penelope Hulse	Director	
Victoria Kingi	Director	
John Bridgman	Director	

==== Chairpersons ====
- Roger Bonifant (2001–2004)
- Patrick Snedden (2005–2010)
- Alan Jackson (2011–2012)
- Allan Freeth (2013–2014)
- Adrienne Young-Cooper (2014–2019)
- Simon Moutter (2024–present)

=== Senior management ===
The Kāinga Ora Leadership Team at 23 July 2021 was as follows.

Name	Title	Notes
Matt Crockett	Chief executive	
Caroline Butterworth	DCE Auckland & Northland	
Daniel Soughtton	DCE Central	
Paul Commons	DCE South Island	
Te Ariki Pihama	Ring Raupa DCE Māori	
Matthew Hulett	General Manager Delivery Transformation	
Caroline McDowall	General Manager Commercial	
Patrick Dougherty	General manager Construction & Innovation	
Nick Maling	General manager National Services	
Gareth Stiven	General manager Strategy, Finance & Policy	
Rowan Macrae	General manager People, Governance & Capability	
Katja Lietz	General manager Urban Planning & Design	
Mark Fraser	General manager Urban Development & Delivery	

==== Chief executives ====
- Michael Lennon (2001–2003)
- Helen Fulcher (2003–2006)
- Lesley McTurk (2006–2012)
- Glen Sowry (2013–2016)
- Andrew McKenzie (2016–present)

== Controversies ==
=== Arena Williams advertisement ===
In November 2021, Kāinga Ora drew controversy after Newshub and Radio New Zealand reported that the agency had used Labour Party candidate Arena Williams in a taxpayer funded advertisement in 2020, compromising its political neutrality. Kāinga Ora drew criticism from Housing Minister Megan Woods and National Party Nicola Willis on the grounds of professionalism and compromising its political neutrality. Woods subsequently reported the agency to the Public Service Commission. The National Party called for an investigation into Kāinga Ora, alleging a cover up and "culture of deceit."

=== Eviction policies ===
In March 2024, Housing Minister Chris Bishop and Finance Minister Nicola Willis ordered Kāinga Ora to end the previous Labour Government's "Sustainable Tenancies Framework" and take disciplinary action against unruly tenants and those with overdue rent through evictions and relocations. The Government's announcement was criticised by Green Party housing spokesperson Tamatha Paul, who described the policy as seeking to create a category of "undeserving poor" and argued that housing was a basic right. Labour Party housing spokesperson Kieran McAnulty responded that the Government's policy failed to address the housing shortage. By contrast, ACT Party leader David Seymour and Manurewa-Papakura Ward Councillor Daniel Newman welcomed the eviction of unruly state housing tenants.

In mid July 2024, RNZ reported that 14 state housing tenancies had been revoked in the past three months due to behavioural issues or persistent rent arrears. In addition, 80 Section 55A formal warning notices had been issued to tenants for disruptive behaviour over the past three months, compared to 13 warnings for the same period in 2023. Housing Minister Bishop praised the increase in disciplinary actions against unruly tenants, saying that "there needs to be consequences for bad behaviour." Citizens Advice Bureau national advisor Sacha Green also confirmed that her group had seen a 24% increase in customers seeking eviction-related advice in 2024 and attributed problematic behaviour to various underlying issues including mental health, addiction and poverty.

In late December 2024, Stuff reported that the number of warnings and evictions for Kāinga Ora had risen exponentially between 2022 and 2024. The number of warnings issued rose from 57 during the 2022-2023 year to 202 in the 2023-2024 year. Between 1 July and 31 October 2024, a record 375 warnings were issued. If a tenant receives three warnings during a 90-day period, Kāinga Ora can apply to the Tenancy Tribunal to terminate their tenancy. In addition, the number of evictions rose from two in 2022-2023 to 17 in 2023-2024 and 17 between 1 July and 31 October 2024.

=== Procurement policies ===
In December 2024, Kāinga Ora was criticised by Associate Agriculture Minister Mark Patterson for excluding woollen products from its procurement policies in favour of nylon products due to its durability and lower cost.
