= Maryan Street =

New Zealand politician

The Honourable Maryan Street MNZM
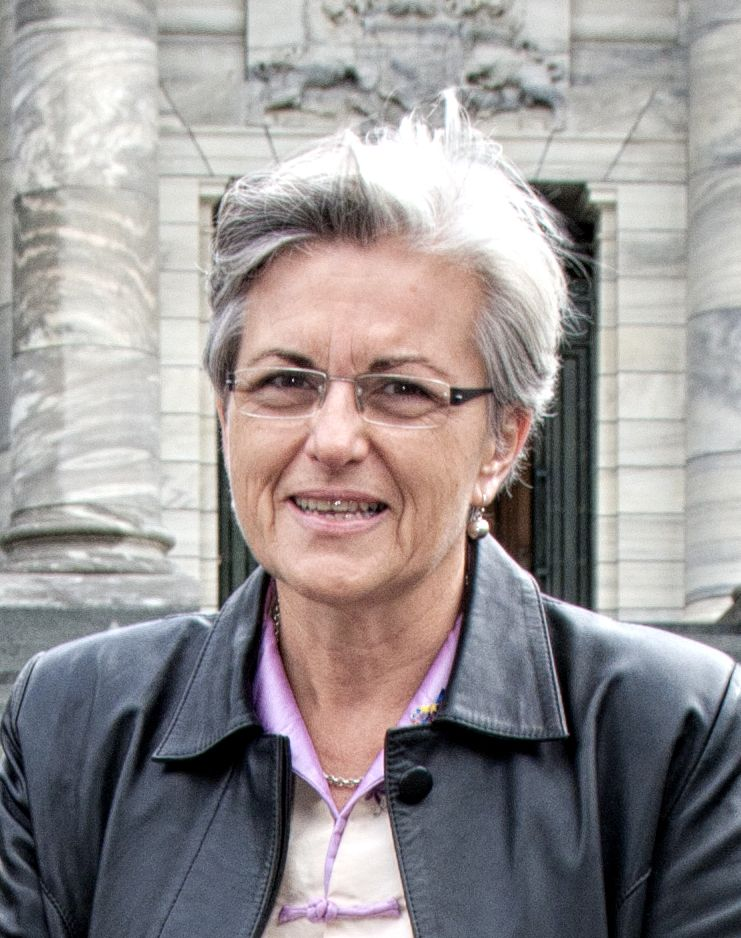
- Street in 2012

22nd Minister of Housing
- In office 31 October 2007 – 19 November 2008
- Prime Minister: Helen Clark
- Preceded by: Chris Carter
- Succeeded by: Phil Heatley

8th Minister for ACC
- In office 31 October 2007 – 19 November 2008
- Prime Minister: Helen Clark
- Preceded by: Ruth Dyson
- Succeeded by: Nick Smith

Member of the New Zealand Parliament for Labour Party List
- In office 17 September 2005 – 20 September 2014

29th President of the Labour Party
- In office 1993–1995
- Preceded by: Ruth Dyson
- Succeeded by: Michael Hirschfeld

Personal details
- Born: 5 April 1955 (age 71) New Plymouth, New Zealand
- Party: Labour Party

Maryan Street MNZM (born 5 April 1955) is a New Zealand unionist, academic and former politician. She was president of the New Zealand Labour Party from 1993 to 1995 and a Labour Party list member of the New Zealand House of Representatives from 2005 until 2014.

For the final year of the Fifth Labour Government, Street held the offices of Minister of Housing and Minister for the Accident Compensation Corporation. She was the first openly lesbian MP elected to the New Zealand Parliament.

== Early life and career ==
Street was born and raised in New Plymouth. In her youth, she intended to become a Presbyterian minister but instead studied English literature and comparative religion at Victoria University of Wellington, receiving a BA (Hons) in 1976. She thereafter trained as a teacher and taught at Westlake Girls High School. It was through teaching that she became involved in unionism, joining the Post-Primary Teachers' Association which she chaired from 1981 to 1983.

She joined the New Zealand Labour Party in 1984, and was the party's senior vice president from 1991 to 1993 and president from 1993 to 1995. She succeeded Margaret Wilson and Ruth Dyson as the third female Labour Party president; all three would together serve as Members of Parliament between 2005 and 2008. Street's term as president included the 1993 general election and subsequent Labour leadership change from Mike Moore to Helen Clark. Despite the president's obligation to support the leader, Street gave a radio interview in November 1993 that, in her view, Moore should no longer be the leader. She justified this by saying she thought her statement was made in the best interests of the party. Street wrote to Moore asking him to step down voluntarily, but he refused.

In 1990, Street was appointed senior lecturer in management relations and director of labour studies at Auckland University. She gained a Master of Philosophy in industrial relations from Auckland in 1993 and began, but did not complete, a PhD on worker participation. After leaving the university in 1999 she worked as the employment relations manager for District Health Boards New Zealand, an incorporated society established to coordinate advocacy efforts for the country's district health boards, and also served on the boards of government agencies Housing New Zealand and the Crown Forestry Rental Trust (an agency involved in the Treaty settlements process) from 2000 to 2005.

== Member of Parliament ==
New Zealand Parliament
Years	Term	Electorate	List	Party
2005–2008	48th	List	36	Labour
2008–2011	49th	List	9	Labour
2011–2014	50th	List	7	Labour

Street was named as a potential future candidate for Labour in September 2004 and confirmed that November as a candidate for the 2005 general election. In May 2005, she was selected to contest the National Party stronghold of Taranaki-King Country, which she lost to the incumbent Shane Ardern in the September election. Ranked thirty-sixth on the party list, the second highest position given by Labour in 2005 to a person who was not already a member of Parliament, Street was elected to parliament as a list MP.

In her 16 November 2005 maiden statement, Street set out a human rights agenda. She said she stood for public office to campaign for social justice and believed human rights were at the core of democracy. “I have not come into this House to be less than brave about the human rights of those whom some would seek to marginalise. I seek an inclusive, just, and tolerant society as one that is more likely to be peaceful, productive, and safe for our children to grow up in. A pluralist society is stable because of its differences, not despite them. It is the very differences between people, working together peacefully and with respect for each other, that allow a society to remain strong and cohesive.”

As a first-term MP with previous political experience, Street was immediately marked as a future minister. She was deputy chair of the health committee, and also sat on the commerce and regulatory review committees, from 2005 until 2007, when she was appointed a Cabinet minister in the Fifth Labour Government. Between 31 October 2007 and 19 November 2008 she served as Minister of Housing, Minister for the Accident Compensation Corporation, Associate Minister of Tertiary Education, and Associate Minister of Economic Development. She was regarded as a competent minister by columnist John Armstrong and progressed legislation intended to improve affordable housing availability and to support pensioners to access vocational rehabilitation schemes.

In the 2008 and 2011 general elections, Street contested the Nelson electorate, where she was defeated by National Party incumbent Nick Smith. She was returned each time for her second and third terms as a list MP. With Labour in opposition after the 2008 election, Street was the party's spokesperson for tertiary education, trade, Treaty of Waitangi negotiations and foreign affairs in the 49th New Zealand Parliament and for health, the environment, disarmament and arms control, and state services in the 50th Parliament. She sat on the parliamentary committees for education, foreign affairs, health, and justice between 2008 and 2014, and chaired the regulations review committee from February 2013 to August 2014.

As a government backbencher and opposition MP, Street championed law changes to address tenants’ insurance rights, ethical investment, banning the importation of goods made by slave labour, and the right to die with dignity, though none were enacted. She has also been a lead supporter of legislated human rights for the LGBTQI communities. Street advocated on behalf of political prisoners and refugees from Myanmar. In 2010, she put a motion before the New Zealand Parliament to affirm the commitment to human rights for political prisoners in Myanmar and visited Myanmar in November 2012 to observe the rollout of the Gavi vaccination programme. Street supported the professional development of young leaders from Myanmar and participated in the Ministry of Foreign Affairs and Trade's Myanmar Young Leaders Programme.

Street supported Grant Robertson in the 2013 Labour Party leadership election. She was defeated for a third time in Nelson at the 2014 general election. Despite her relatively high place of 15th on the Labour Party list, the party's poor performance under leader David Cunliffe meant she was not returned as a list MP. She declined the opportunity to return as a list MP in 2017 and did not contest the 2017 general election.

== International work and later career ==
Street worked as an international observer of general elections across Africa and Asia, mostly on behalf of the Commonwealth, with a focus on human rights and good governance. She has observed elections in Lesotho (2007 and 2015), Sierra Leone (2018), and the Maldives (2019).

After leaving Parliament, Street continued to maintain a high profile as a campaigner for euthanasia, other human rights causes and employment relations. She has worked for KiwiRail as employment relations manager from 2015 to 2022. She was appointed to the Victoria University of Wellington council for a four-year term from 2021 and to the KiwiRail board in July 2022 for a three-year term.

== Awards and honours ==
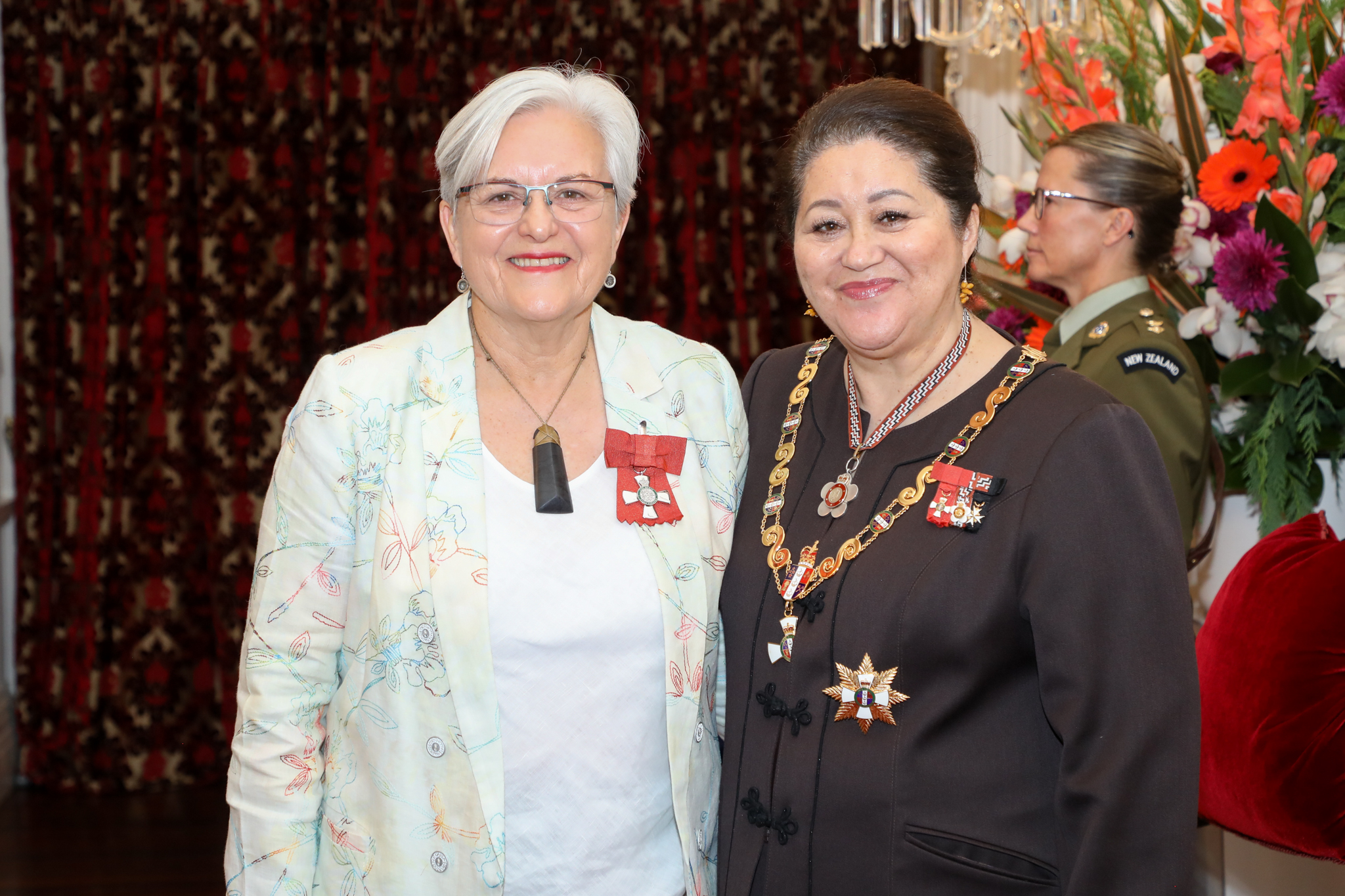
Street (left), after her investiture as a Member of the New Zealand Order of Merit by the governor-general, Dame Cindy Kiro, at Government House, Wellington, on 23 May 2024

Street was awarded the New Zealand 1990 Commemoration Medal for service to New Zealand in 1990 and the New Zealand Suffrage Centennial Medal for service to women in 1993. In the 2024 New Year Honours, Street was appointed a Member of the New Zealand Order of Merit, for services as a member of Parliament and to human and democratic rights.

Party political offices
Preceded by Ruth Dyson	President of the Labour Party; 1993–1995	Succeeded by Michael Hirschfeld
Political offices
Preceded by Chris Carter	Minister of Housing; 2007–2008	Succeeded by Phil Heatley
Preceded by Ruth Dyson	Minister for ACC; 2007–2008	Succeeded by Nick Smith
