= Radio Spectrum Management =

New Zealand radio spectrum regulator

Agency overview
- Jurisdiction: New Zealand Government
- Parent agency: Ministry of Business, Innovation and Employment
- Website: https://www.rsm.govt.nz/

The Radio Spectrum Management (RSM) is a New Zealand public service business unit within the Ministry of Business, Innovation and Employment (MBIE) that is in charge of the radio spectrum and radio-related regulations in New Zealand.

Radio Spectrum Management is charged with regulating New Zealand's radio spectrum activities such as planning, allocations, and licensing.
