= Fifeshire Foundation =

Charitable organisation in the Nelson/Tasman region

The Fifeshire Foundation is a charitable organisation operating in the Nelson/Tasman region of New Zealand.

The Foundation was established and registered in 1993. During its first year, it distributed $6,600 in grants. The organisation offers assistance to people in need, covering expenses such as dental work, medical expenses, swimming lessons, clothing, school camps and drivers’ licence costs. There is a scheme specifically to assist with heating costs in winter, and at Christmas there is a collection and distribution of toys and food.

The organisation is supported by grants from Whakatū Rotary Club, Network Tasman and New Zealand King Salmon. Local businesses also provide professional services free of charge, such as printing, web design, legal advice and media relations.
