= Ministry of Business, Innovation and Employment =

Government ministry of New Zealand

- Hīkina Whakatutuki (Māori)

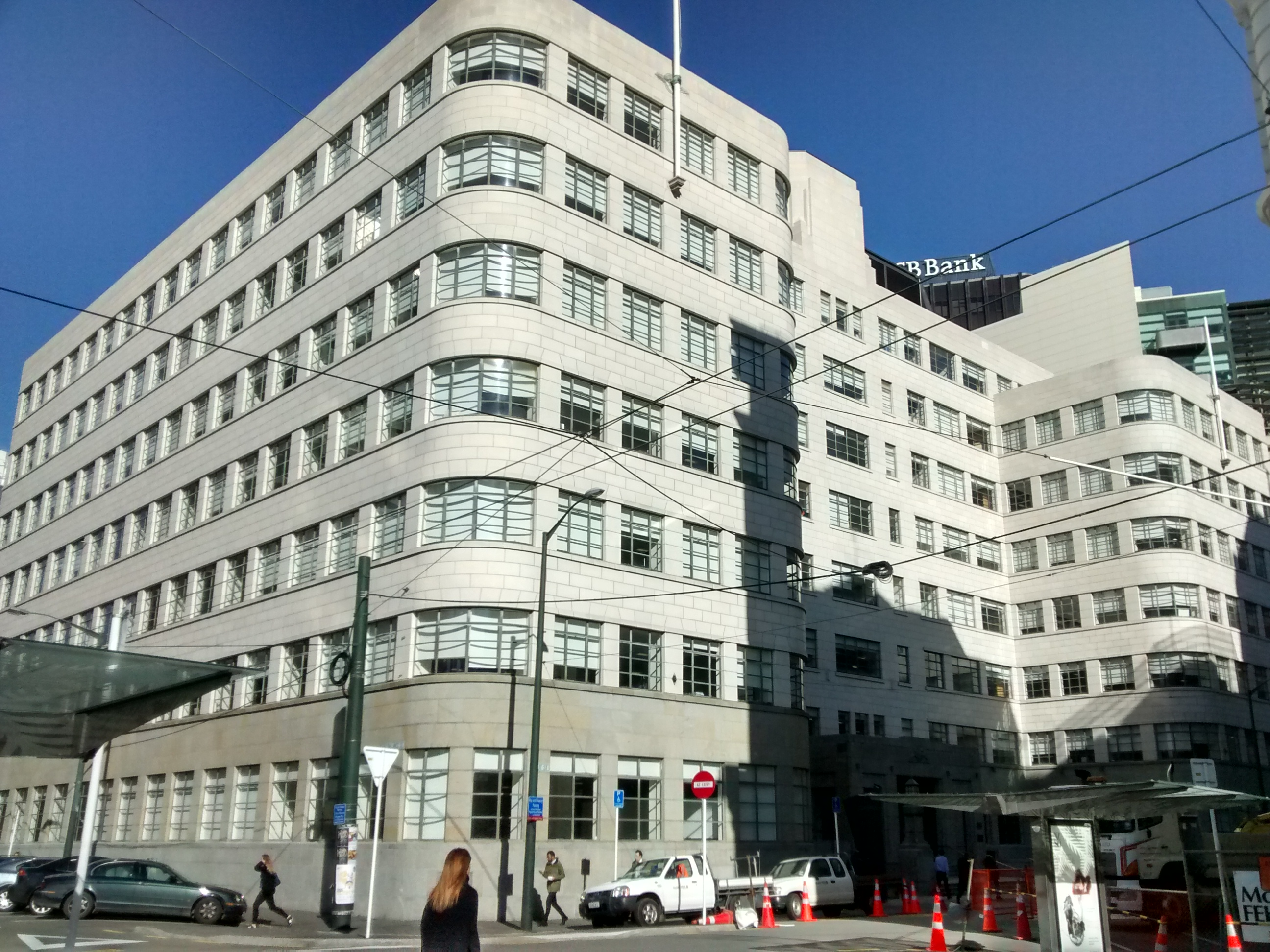
- MBIE head office, Wellington

Agency overview
- Formed: 2012
- Preceding agencies: Department of Building and Housing; Department of Labour; Ministry of Economic Development; Ministry of Science and Innovation
- Type: Public service department
- Jurisdiction: New Zealand
- Headquarters: 15 Stout Street Wellington 6011; 41.2811887°S 174.7768489°E
- Annual budget: Total budgets for 2019/20; Vote Business, Science and Innovation ▲$3,851,912,000; Vote Building and Construction ▼$112,438,000; Vote Labour Market ▲$2,040,966,000
- Minister responsible: Hon Nicola Willis Minister for Economic Growth
- Agency executive: Nic Blakeley Secretary for Business, Innovation and Employment
- Child agencies: Immigration New Zealand; New Zealand Space Agency
- Website: mbie.govt.nz

The Ministry of Business, Innovation and Employment (MBIE; Māori: Hīkina Whakatutuki) is the public service department of New Zealand charged with "delivering policy, services, advice and regulation to support business growth".

MBIE is the New Zealand Government's lead microeconomic agency and one of its largest government departments. In 2024/25, it employed more than 5,800 full-time-equivalent staff across 40 offices in New Zealand and overseas, and had responsibilities spanning 19 ministerial portfolios and 17 regulatory systems. Its areas of responsibility include immigration, tourism, construction, energy, communications, natural resources, regional development and government procurement.

== History ==
Formed on 1 July 2012, MBIE is a merger of the Department of Building and Housing (DBH), the Department of Labour (DoL), the Ministry of Economic Development (MED), and the Ministry of Science and Innovation (MSI). The government said the merger was intended to improve coordination between the agencies, reduce duplication and make it easier for business to engage with the government.

The Ministry was responsible for the Pike River Recovery Agency from 31 January 2018 to 1 July 2022.

In October 2018, the newly created Ministry of Housing and Urban Development (HUD) assumed several of MBIE's housing policy, funding and regulatory functions including the KiwiBuild programme, the Community Housing Regulatory Authority, and administration of funding for the HomeStart, Welcome Home Loans, the legacy Social Housing Fund and Community Group Housing programmes.

On 14 July 2020, the Ministry assumed responsibility for running the New Zealand Government's COVID-19 managed isolation and quarantine (MIQ) programme. The last four MIQ facilities closed in June 2022.

In October 2023, RNZ reported that MBIE had a secret intelligence unit focusing on immigration, intelligence and operational matters. It drew criticism from the Federation of Islamic Associations of New Zealand for using tools from Israeli surveillance firm Cobwebs Technologies to scour the social media accounts of prospective immigrants. In April 2024, the Ministry chose not to renew its contract with Cobwebs for undisclosed reasons.

By April 2024, MBIE had laid off 286 employees as part of Government cost-cutting measures in the public sector. 111 resigned in the first wave of voluntary redundancies while 175 full-time roles were disestablished between December 2023 and March 2024.

In mid-February 2025, the Crown Research Institute Callaghan Innovation announced that its funding and grant services and the Health Tech Activator would be transferred to MBIE. The New Zealand Government had earlier in January 2025 announced plans to dissolve Callaghan Innovation and replace the various Crown Research Institutes with four new Public Research Organisations by 1 July 2025.

In mid-June 2026, the Minister of Immigration Erica Stanford criticised MBIE and Immigration New Zealand officials for allegedly misleading her and her predecessors Kris Faafoi and Andrew Little about the failed NZ$33 million Immigration Biometric Upgrade project, which ran between November 2018 and November 2025 without delivering anything. Stanford alleged that MBIE officials used "creative accounting" to avoid scrutiny from the New Zealand Cabinet and misled Crown ministers about the cost and progress of the project. In response, the Public Service Commission and MBIE launched separate investigations into the Immigration Biometric Upgrade Project and another similar IT upgrade project called "Our Future Services." On 26 August, the New Zealand Parliament's Privileges Committee found the Ministry's chief executive Nick Blakeley and former Immigration New Zealand head Alison McDonald in contempt of Parliament for failing to disclose that the biometric upgrade project had been cancelled during a meeting with the Education and Workforce select committee in March 2026. By late September 2026, Blakely acknowledged that MBIE had spent NZ$50.7 million in taxpayer funding on the botched biometric upgrade project.

In November 2026, MBIE agreed to pay a record $251,000 in reparations to the online magazine National Business Review for the unauthorised sharing of paywalled stories among its employees.

== Structure ==
Senior Leadership

- Chief Executive and Secretary (Ministry of Business, Innovation and Employment)
  - Deputy Secretary – Labour, Science and Enterprise
  - Deputy Secretary – Corporate and Digital Shared Services
  - Deputy Secretary – Immigration
  - Deputy Secretary – Regional Development and Commercial Services
  - Deputy Secretary – Strategy and Assurance
  - Deputy Secretary – Building, Resources and Markets
  - Deputy Secretary – Te Whakatairanga Service Delivery
  - Chief Advisor to the Secretary

== Operational functions ==
The Ministry manages a number of operational services, including:

- Building Practitioners Board
- Building Systems Performance
- Business.govt.nz
- Companies Office, which also manages registers for:
  - motor-vehicle traders
  - financial-service providers
  - societies and trusts
  - personal-property securities
- Consumer Protection (formerly the Ministry of Consumer Affairs)
- Electrical Workers Registration Board
- Employment New Zealand
- Government procurement
- Immigration Advisers Authority
- Immigration New Zealand
- Insolvency and Trustee Service
- Intellectual Property Office of New Zealand
- Major events
- Māori Economic Development, including partnership with the independent Māori Economic Development Panel and partnering in He kai kei aku ringa (HKKAR – providing the food you need with your own hands) – the Māori Economic Development Strategy and Action Plan
- "MI": a secret intelligence unit focusing on immigration, intelligence and operational matters.
- Motor Vehicle Traders Register
- New Zealand Petroleum and Minerals
- Natural Hazards Research Platform (NHRP)
- New Zealand Cycle Trail
- New Zealand Space Agency
- Personal Property Securities Register
- Provincial Growth Fund
- Radio Spectrum Management
- Registrar of Unions
- Resolution Services
- Standards New Zealand
- State Housing Appeals Authority
- Strategic Science Investment Fund (SSIF)
- Tenancy Services
- Trading Services
- Vision Mātauranga (indigenous knowledge policy)
- Weathertight Services

== Monitoring functions ==
The ministry is the monitor of the following Crown entities, Crown research institutes, statutory boards and non-listed companies.

Name	Entity type
Accident Compensation Corporation	Crown entity
Accreditation Council	Crown entity
AgResearch Limited	Crown research institute
Building Practitioners Board	Statutory body
Callaghan Innovation	Crown entity
Chartered Professional Engineers Council	Statutory body
Commerce Commission	Independent Crown entity
Crown Infrastructure Partners Limited	Public Finance Act 1989 Schedule 4A non-listed company
Education New Zealand	Crown entity
Electrical Workers Registration Board	Statutory body
Electricity Authority	Independent Crown entity
Energy Efficiency and Conservation Authority	Crown entity
Engineering Associates Registration Board	Statutory body
Institute of Environmental Science and Research Limited	Crown research institute
External Reporting Board	Independent Crown entity
Financial Markets Authority	Crown entity
Institute of Geological and Nuclear Science Limited (GNS Science)	Crown research institute
Landcare Research New Zealand Limited (Manaaki Whenua)	Crown research institute
National Institute of Water and Atmospheric Research Limited (NIWA)	Crown research institute
New Zealand Institute for Plant & Food Research Limited	Crown research institute
New Zealand Forest Research Institute Limited (Scion)	Crown research institute
New Zealand Registered Architects Board	Statutory body
New Zealand Tourism Board	Crown entity
New Zealand Trade and Enterprise	Crown entity
New Zealand Growth Capital Partners (formerly New Zealand Venture Investment Fund)	Crown entity company
Plumbers, Gasfitters and Drainlayers Board	Statutory body
REANNZ (Research & Education Advanced Network NZ Ltd)	Crown entity
Takeovers Panel	Independent Crown entity
Te Ara Ahunga Ora Retirement Commission	Crown entity
Tertiary Education Commission	Crown entity
WorkSafe New Zealand	Crown entity

== Ministers ==
The Ministry serves 21 portfolios, 16 ministers and 2 parliamentary under-secretaries.

Officeholder	Portfolios	Other responsibilities
Hon Nicola Willis	Lead Minister (Ministry of Business, Innovation and Employment); Minister for Economic Growth	
Hon Chris Bishop	Minister of Housing; Minister for Infrastructure	
Hon Erica Stanford	Minister of Immigration	
Hon Paul Goldsmith	Minister for Media and Communications; Minister for the Public Service; Minister for Space	
Hon Louise Upston	Minister for Social Development and Employment; Minister for Tourism and Hospitality	
Hon Todd McClay	Minister for Trade and Investment	
Hon Tama Potaka		Associate Minister of Housing
Hon Simon Watts	Minister for Energy; Minister for Building and Construction	Minister for Auckland
Hon Penny Simmonds	Minister of Science, Innovation and Technology	Associate Minister for Social Development and Employment
Hon Scott Simpson	Minister for ACC	
Hon Cameron Brewer	Minister of Commerce and Consumer Affairs; Minister for Small Business and Manufacturing	
Hon James Meager		Minister for the South Island
Hon Brooke van Velden	Minister for Workplace Relations and Safety	
Hon Shane Jones	Minister for Regional Development; Minister for Resources	Associate Minister for Energy
Hon Casey Costello		Associate Minister of Immigration
Hon Mark Patterson		Associate Minister for Regional Development
Simon Court		Parliamentary Under-Secretary to the Minister for Infrastructure
Jenny Marcroft		Parliamentary Under-Secretary to the Minister for Media and Communications
