= Property cycle =

Recurrent events influencing the property market

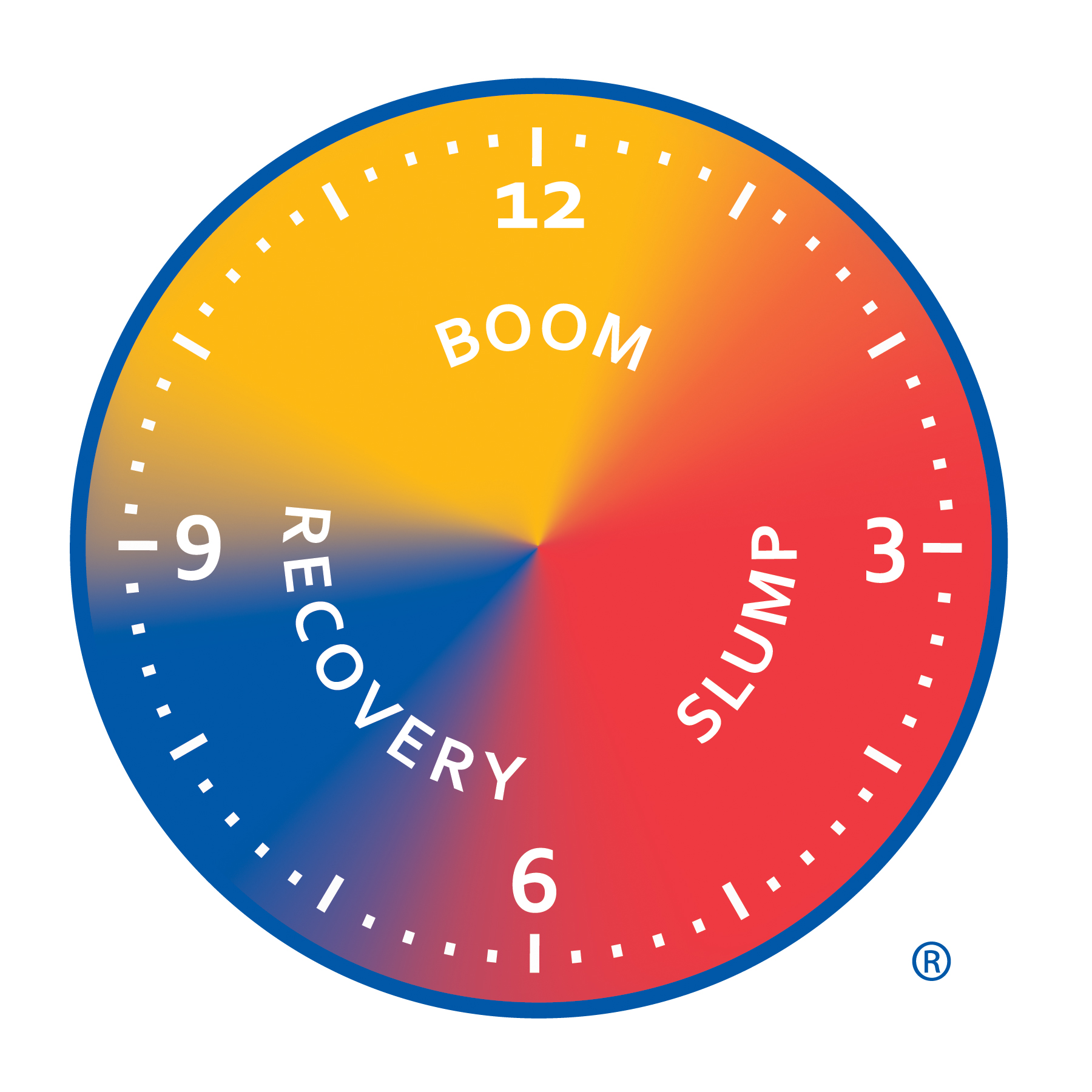
Property cycle clock

A property cycle is a sequence of recurrent events reflected in demographic, economic and emotional factors that affect supply and demand for property subsequently influencing the property market. Cyclical patterns are a well-documented and consistent feature of housing markets.

== See also ==
- Real Estate Economics
- Law of rent
- Housing bubble
