= Health and Disability Commissioner =

New Zealand Crown entity

- Te Toihau Hauora, Hauātanga

Agency overview
- Formed: 1994
- Jurisdiction: New Zealand
- Agency executive: Morag McDowell, Health and Disability Commissioner
- Website: http://www.hdc.org.nz/

The Health And Disability Commissioner (Māori: Te Toihau Hauora, Hauātanga) is a New Zealand Crown entity responsible for promoting and protecting the rights of health and disability services consumers, and facilitating the fair, simple, speedy, and efficient resolution of complaints.

== History ==
Prior to 1972 to obtain compensation for illness, accident or disability the consumer would have to go through the Workers Compensation act, or through the common law. The Woodhouse report led to the Accident Compensation Act (1994). The purpose of this was to speed treatment and compensation. Consumers could not sue healthcare providers under this act. The Accident Compensation Act (1974) was intended to give better access to services for consumers. However the shortcomings with this was that healthcare providers that consistently provided substandard care were not penalized. Following the Cartwright inquiry, the Health and Disability act (1992) appointed the Health and Disability commissioner to receive complaints from consumers, review and address where there are breaches.

Morag McDowell became Health and Disability Commissioner in September 2020. She came to the HDC after 13 years as a Coroner in the Auckland region.

== Function of the HDC ==
The Health and Disability Commissioner is established under the Health and Disability Commissioner Act 1994. The statutory purpose of the Health and Disability Commissioner is to "promote and protect the rights of health consumers and disability services consumers," and facilitate "the fair, simple, speedy, and efficient resolution of complaints". To this end, the Health and Disability Commissioner's stated functions are to:

1. Promote, by education and publicity, respect for and observance of the rights of health and disability services consumers, and, in particular, to promote awareness among health and disability services consumers and health and disability services providers, of the rights of health and disability services consumers, and of the means by which those rights may be enforced;
2. Make public statements and publish reports in relation to any matter affecting the rights of health and disability services consumers, including statements and reports that promote an understanding of, and compliance with, the Code or the provisions of the Act;
3. Act as the initial recipient of complaints about health care providers and disability services providers, and to ensure that each complaint is appropriately dealt with;
4. Investigate, on complaint or on the Commissioner's own initiative, any action that is or appears to be in breach of the Code of Health and Disability Services Consumers' Rights 1996 (a regulation under the Health and Disability Commissioner Act 1994);
5. Refer complaints or investigations on the Commissioner's own initiative to the Director of Proceedings for the purpose of deciding whether or not any further action should be taken in respect of any such breach or alleged breach;
6. Make recommendations to any appropriate person or authority in relation to the means by which complaints involving alleged breaches of the Code may be resolved and further breaches avoided;
7. Prepare guidelines for the operation of advocacy services;
8. Make suggestions to any person in relation to any matter that concerns the need for, or desirability of, action by that person in the interests of the rights of health consumers or disability services consumers;
9. Advise the Minister of Health on any matter relating to the rights of health and disability services consumers or the administration of the Act;
10. Review the Code of Rights and make recommendations to the Minister of Health about changes to the Code;
11. report to the Minister of Health on the need for, or desirability of, legislative, administrative or other action to give protection or better protection to the rights of health or disability services consumers;
12. receive and invite representations from members of the public and from any other body, organisation or agency on matters relating to the rights of health consumers or disability services consumers;
13. gather information that in the Commissioner's opinion will assist in carrying out the Commissioner's functions under the Act;
14. do anything incidental or conducive to carrying out the above functions;
15. perform functions that are authorised by the Minister of Health;
16. exercise and perform such other functions, powers and duties as are conferred or imposed on the Commissioner under the Act or by any other enactment;
17. establish and maintain links with representatives of consumers, providers, and other bodies and organisations concerned with health or disability matters in performing his or her functions; and
18. consult and co-operate with other agencies concerned with personal rights in performing his or her functions.

== See also ==
- Cartwright Inquiry
- Accident Compensation Act 2001
