= Department of Labour (New Zealand) =

Former government ministry in New Zealand

Department of Labour Te Tari Mahi
- Department of Labour logo

Department overview
- Formed: June 1891
- Dissolved: 30 June 2012
- Superseding Department: Ministry of Business, Innovation and Employment
- Jurisdiction: New Zealand
- Child Department: Immigration New Zealand
- Website: www.dol.govt.nz

The Department of Labour (Māori: Te Tari Mahi) was a New Zealand public sector organisation tasked with improving the performance of the labour market and, through this, strengthening the economy and increasing the standard of living.

It was replaced with the Ministry of Business, Innovation and Employment on 1 July 2012.

== History ==
The department was established under the Liberal Government of New Zealand in 1891 as the Bureau of Industries with Edward Tregear as its sole employee. The following year, when W. Pember Reeves was appointed the first Minister of Labour, the department changed its name to the Department of Labour.

The Labour Department Act 1893 defined the general duties of and powers of the department, which were to administer the labour laws, acquire and disseminate knowledge of occupations with a view to improving relations between employers and workers, and collect and publish information on industries and rates of wages. Over time, the functions of the department changed, including the acquisition of responsibilities around employment. The department's functions were reaffirmed through the Labour Department Act 1954. As a result, the Employment and Immigration Departments were merged into the Department of Labour.

One division of the Department of Labour was the Immigration Department, which was established in 1912. The Immigration Department underwent several incarnations including the Immigration Division and Immigration Service before assuming its current name, Immigration New Zealand.

The department produced a monthly paper, the Labour Journal. Publication ended in April 1917, after which some of the department's statistics appeared in the Government Statistician's Monthly Abstract.

From 1977 to 1980 the Department of Labour ran a Temporary Employment Programme (TEP) where in 1979 out of the 23,700 registered unemployed there were 26,100 employed in special work programmes mostly the TEP. From 1980 to 1986 was the Project Employment Programme (PEP scheme) for unemployed workers.

== Disestablishment ==
In March 2012 Prime Minister John Key announced that the Department of Labour would be integrated into a new Ministry, the Ministry of Business, Innovation and Employment (MBIE), comprising the Ministry of Economic Development, the Department of Labour, the Ministry of Science and Innovation and the Department of Building and Housing. The new Ministry began operating on 1 July 2012. Immigration New Zealand also followed its parent organisation into MBIE.

Employment New Zealand is the brand name for the part of the MBIE responsible for overseeing the former functions of the Department of Labour.
