= Resn =

Resn is a digital production company from New Zealand that works within the advertising industry. The company was founded in 2004 by Rik Campbell and Steve Le Marquand. Resn has one office in Wellington, New Zealand, and one in Amsterdam, Netherlands.

== Clients and recognition ==
Resn has created digital productions for brands such as Panasonic, Coke, Ricoh, Toyota, Johnson & Johnson, and the All Blacks.

Resn has been the recipient of Webby Awards, Awwwards and is a member of the FWA Hall of Fame.
