= Minister of Housing (New Zealand) =

New Zealand minister of the Crown

- Coat of arms of New Zealand

- Flag of New Zealand

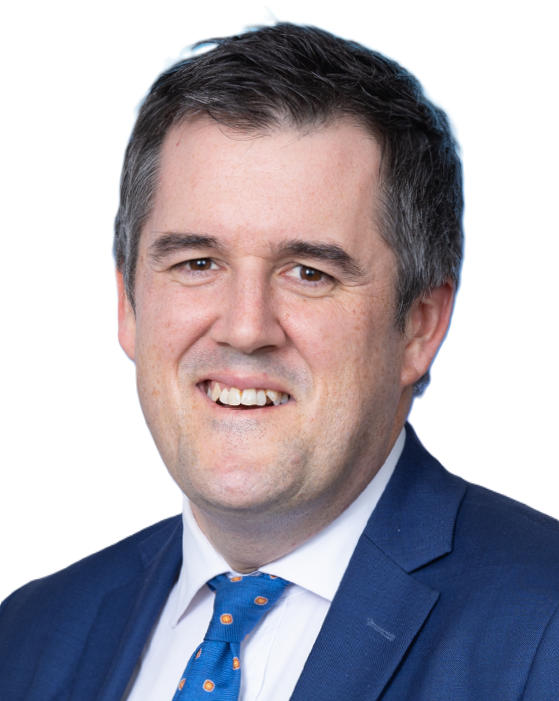
- Incumbent; Chris Bishop since 27 November 2023
- Ministry of Housing and Urban Development
- Style: The Honourable
- Member of: Cabinet of New Zealand; Executive Council
- Reports to: Prime Minister of New Zealand
- Appointer: Governor-General of New Zealand
- Term length: At His Majesty's pleasure
- Precursor: Minister of Housing and Urban Development
- Formation: 13 December 1938
- First holder: Tim Armstrong
- Salary: $288,900
- Website: www.beehive.govt.nz

The Minister of Housing is a minister in the New Zealand Government with responsibility for the government's house-building programme. The position was established in 1938 as Minister in charge of Housing, and has most commonly been known as Minister of Housing. Other iterations have included the Minister of Building and Housing, the Minister of Social Housing, and the Minister of Housing and Urban Development.

The present Minister is Chris Bishop.

== History ==
The First Labour Government created the position of Minister in charge of Housing in 1938, to oversee the government's state housing agenda. Responsibility for housing was part of the Works portfolio for some years until the restoration of the Housing portfolio by the Second National Government in 1949.

Until the 1970s, the Housing portfolio was often held in conjunction with responsibility for the State Advances Corporation; the Corporation was dissolved and much of its responsibility transferred to the new Housing Corporation of New Zealand in 1974. In the 1990s, under the significant redistribution of responsibility that occurred following Jenny Shipley's appointment as Prime Minister, responsibility for housing issues was divided between three ministers: the Minister for Social Services, Work and Income; the Minister responsible for the Housing Corporation of New Zealand; and the Minister responsible for Housing New Zealand. The Housing Corporation and Housing New Zealand merged into a single entity, Housing New Zealand Corporation, on 6 March 2002.

A separate Minister for Building Issues (later Minister for Building and Construction) was established by the Fourth Labour Government as the Ministry of Housing was expanded to become the Department of Building and Housing. Under the Fifth National Government, the government's focus shifted from providing state houses to providing "social houses," which meant that income-related rent subsidies could be paid to non-governmental community housing providers. While this Government had once combined social housing and building regulation responsibility in a combined "Building and Housing" portfolio, this was disestablished in December 2016 and divided between the Minister for Social Housing and the Minister for Building and Construction.

Following the 2017 election, the Labour-New Zealand First-Green coalition government revamped the portfolio as the Minister of Housing and Urban Development. Phil Twyford was appointed as Housing Minister. On 1 October 2018, Housing Minister Twyford launched a new government department called the Ministry of Housing and Urban Development to advise the Government on housing and urban development issues. During a 2019 cabinet reshuffle the housing and urban development portfolio was split into three positions; appointing Megan Woods as Minister of Housing, Kris Faafoi as Associate Minister of Housing (for rentals), and Twyford as Minister of Urban Development. After the 2020 election Woods was confirmed as Minister of Housing while the urban development portfolio was abolished completely. In early 2021, the Labour government was criticised by the opposition government and some housing industry stakeholders, who said the government has failed to address New Zealand's out-of-control house prices.

== List of ministers ==
Key

Labour National

No.	Name	Portrait	Term of office		Prime Minister
As Minister in charge of Housing
1	Tim Armstrong		13 December 1938	8 November 1942†	Savage
1	Tim Armstrong		13 December 1938	8 November 1942†	Fraser
As Minister in charge of Housing Construction
2	Bob Semple		9 December 1942	December 1945	Fraser
1945–1949: See Minister of Works
3	Stan Goosman		13 December 1949	9 September 1953	Holland
As Minister of Housing
4	Bill Sullivan		9 September 1953	13 February 1957	Holland
5	Dean Eyre		13 February 1957	26 September 1957	Holland
5	Dean Eyre		13 February 1957	26 September 1957	Holyoake
6	John Rae		26 September 1957	12 December 1957	Holyoake
7	Bill Fox		12 December 1957	12 December 1960	Nash
(6)	John Rae		12 December 1960	9 February 1972	Holyoake
(6)	John Rae		12 December 1960	9 February 1972	Marshall
8	Eric Holland		9 February 1972	8 December 1972	Marshall
9	Bill Fraser		8 December 1972	10 September 1974	Kirk
9	Bill Fraser		8 December 1972	10 September 1974	Rowling
10	Roger Douglas		10 September 1974	12 December 1975	Rowling
11	George Gair		12 December 1975	8 March 1977	Muldoon
(8)	Eric Holland		8 March 1977	13 December 1978	Muldoon
12	Derek Quigley		13 December 1978	15 June 1982	Muldoon
13	Tony Friedlander		15 June 1982	26 July 1984	Muldoon
14	Phil Goff		26 July 1984	24 August 1987	Lange
15	Helen Clark		24 August 1987	14 August 1989	Lange
15	Helen Clark		24 August 1987	14 August 1989	Palmer
16	Jonathan Hunt		14 August 1989	2 November 1990	Palmer
16	Jonathan Hunt		14 August 1989	2 November 1990	Moore
17	John Luxton		2 November 1990	29 November 1993	Bolger
18	Murray McCully		29 November 1993	31 August 1998	Bolger
18	Murray McCully		29 November 1993	31 August 1998	Shipley
1998–1999: See Minister for Social Services, Work and Income; Minister responsible for Housing New Zealand; Minister responsible for the Housing Corporation of New Zealand
19	Mark Gosche		10 December 1999	12 May 2003	Clark
20	Steve Maharey		12 May 2003 (acting); 19 May 2003	19 October 2005	Clark
21	Chris Carter		19 October 2005	5 November 2007	Clark
22	Maryan Street		5 November 2007	19 November 2008	Clark
23	Phil Heatley		19 November 2008	22 January 2013	Key
24	Nick Smith		22 January 2013	8 October 2014	Key
As Minister for Building and Housing
(24)	Nick Smith		8 October 2014	20 December 2016^{a}	Key
(24)	Nick Smith		8 October 2014	20 December 2016^{a}	English
As Minister for Social Housing
25	Paula Bennett		8 October 2014	20 December 2016^{a}	Key
25	Paula Bennett		8 October 2014	20 December 2016^{a}	English
26	Amy Adams		20 December 2016	26 October 2017	English
As Minister of Housing and Urban Development
27	Phil Twyford		26 October 2017	27 June 2019	Ardern
As Minister of Housing
28	Megan Woods		27 June 2019	27 November 2023	Ardern
28	Megan Woods		27 June 2019	27 November 2023	Hipkins
29	Chris Bishop		27 November 2023	present	Luxon

== Notes ==
a. The Ministers for Building and Housing and Social Housing existed simultaneously during the period 8 October 2014 – 20 December 2016.
