= New Zealand Trade and Enterprise =

New Zealand business development agency

Agency overview
- Formed: 1 July 2003
- Jurisdiction: New Zealand
- Ministers responsible: Hon Todd McClay, Minister for Trade; Hon Nicola Willis, Minister for Economic Growth
- Agency executives: Chief executive; Peter Chrisp
- Website: www.nzte.govt.nz

New Zealand Trade and Enterprise (Māori: Te Taurapa Tūhono; abbreviated NZTE) is New Zealand's international business development agency that focuses on helping New Zealand businesses improve their international engagement. It is considered a Crown agent under the Crown Entities Act 2004.

== History ==
NZTE is a Crown agent that was established on 1 July 2003 under the New Zealand Trade and Enterprise Act 2003, which merged Trade New Zealand and Industry New Zealand. NZTE is also regulated by the Crown Entities Act 2004.

In January 2025, the New Zealand Government established a new investment agency called Invest New Zealand as a unit within NZTE. The Government plans to transition Invest NZ into a separate Crown entity.

== Functions and mandate ==
New Zealand Trade and Enterprise (NZTE) is New Zealand's international business development agency. Its role is to support New Zealand’s economic growth by helping New Zealand companies to boost their international trade and engagement.

As of 2025, NZTE is one of the two government agencies, alongside the newly-established Invest New Zealand agency, tasked with boosting economic growth through international trade and investment. The NZTE's mandate is to focus on promoting export growth by facilitating trade and ensuring that New Zealand companies have access to the international market with the necessary support.

== NZTE New Zealand Offices ==
- Auckland
- Christchurch
- Dunedin
- Hamilton
- Hawke’s Bay
- New Plymouth
- Nelson
- Tauranga
- Wellington
- Whangarei

== NZTE International Offices ==
=== Australia-Pacific ===
- Brisbane, Australia
- Melbourne, Australia
- Suva, Fiji
- Sydney, Australia

=== Southeast and East Asia ===
- Bangkok, Thailand
- Ho Chi Minh, Vietnam
- Jakarta, Indonesia
- Kuala Lumpur, Malaysia
- Manila, Philippines
- Mumbai, India
- New Delhi, India
- Seoul, Korea
- Singapore, Singapore
- Tokyo, Japan

=== Greater China ===
- Beijing, China
- Guangzhou, China
- Hong Kong, China
- Shanghai, China
- Taipei, Taiwan

=== Europe, Middle East & Africa ===
- Amsterdam, Netherlands
- Berlin, Germany
- Dubai, United Arab Emirates
- Istanbul, Turkey
- London, United Kingdom
- Madrid, Spain
- Milan, Italy
- Paris, France
- Riyadh, Saudi Arabia

=== North America ===
- Los Angeles, United States of America
- New York, United States of America
- San Francisco, United States of America
- Vancouver, Canada
- Washington DC, United States of America

=== Latin America ===
- Bogota, Colombia
- Mexico City, Mexico
- Santiago, Chile
- São Paulo, Brazil

== Programmes and Services ==
NZTE supports many services designed to grow New Zealand businesses internationally. These include:

- MyNZTE website
- FernMark Licence Programme
- International Growth Fund
- Workshops and Webinars
- Market Research
- Beachhead Advisor Network
- Kea New Zealand
- New Zealand International Business Awards
