= Ministry of Economic Development (New Zealand) =

Former government ministry of New Zealand

Ministry of Economic Development Manatū Ōhanga
- Logo of the Ministry of Economic Development

Agency overview
- Formed: 29 February 2000
- Preceding agency: Ministry of Commerce
- Dissolved: 1 July 2012
- Superseding agency: Ministry of Business, Innovation and Employment
- Jurisdiction: New Zealand
- Website: www.med.govt.nz

The Ministry of Economic Development (Māori: Manatū Ōhanga) was a New Zealand public sector organisation tasked with promoting development of New Zealand's economy. Known as the Ministry of Commerce until 2000, it was renamed in 2000 under the Fifth Labour Government, then replaced with the Ministry of Business, Innovation and Employment on 1 July 2012 by the subsequent National Government.

== History ==
The Ministry dealt with policy in a wide range of different areas including energy, communications, the radio spectrum, industry and regional development, intellectual property, consumer issues, tourism, international trade, and the regulatory environment.

At the time of its disestablishment, the Ministry supported eight ministerial portfolios: the Minister of Economic Development (Lead Minister for the Ministry of Economic Development), the Minister of Commerce, the Minister for Communications and Information Technology, the Minister of Consumer Affairs, the Minister of Energy and Resources, the Minister of Regulatory Reform, the Minister for Small Business, and the Minister of Tourism, and previously provide support for the disestablished positions of Minister for Industry and Regional Development and Minister responsible for the Government Superannuation Fund, and to the Minister of Broadcasting and the Minister for Sport, Fitness and Leisure before support for these positions was provided by the Ministry for Culture and Heritage.

== See also ==
- Ministry of Business, Innovation and Employment
- Communications in New Zealand
- Copyright law of New Zealand
- Economy of New Zealand
- Energy in New Zealand
