= Shadow Cabinet of Phil Goff =

New Zealand shadow cabinet (2008–2011)

New Zealand political leader Phil Goff assembled a "shadow cabinet" after his election to the positions of Leader of the Labour Party and Leader of the Opposition in 2008 unopposed.

The shadow cabinet was mostly made up of New Zealand members of Parliament of the Labour Party; however, Progressive Party leader and sole MP Jim Anderton, who had been in coalition with Labour in the previous Government remained aligned to Labour in Opposition, as the Opposition Agriculture spokesperson.

== Frontbench team ==
=== 2011 ===
By the 2011 general election, the Opposition spokespersons were as follows:

Rank	Spokesperson	Portfolio
1	Hon Phil Goff	Leader of the Opposition; Spokesperson for the NZ Security Intelligence Service
2	Hon Annette King	Deputy Leader; Spokesperson for Social Policy
3	Hon David Cunliffe	Spokesperson for Finance
4	Hon David Parker	Spokesperson for Economic Development; Spokesperson for Energy; Shadow Attorney General; Associate Spokesperson for Finance
5	Hon Ruth Dyson	Spokesperson for Conservation; Spokesperson for State Services; Spokesperson for Immigration
6	Hon Clayton Cosgrove	Spokesperson for Law & Order (incl. Police & Corrections); Spokesperson for State Owned Enterprises; Associate Spokesperson for Finance; Spokesperson for Earthquake Recovery
7	Hon Maryan Street	Spokesperson for Foreign Affairs; Spokesperson for Trade; Spokesperson for Overseas Development Assistance
8	Hon Trevor Mallard	Shadow Leader of the House; Spokesperson for the Rugby World Cup; Spokesperson for the America's Cup; Spokesperson for Sport and Recreation; Associate Spokesperson for Finance
9	Hon Parekura Horomia	Spokesperson for Māori Affairs; Spokesperson for Treaty of Waitangi Negotiations
10	Charles Chauvel	Spokesperson for Justice; Spokesperson for the Environment
11	Grant Robertson	Spokesperson for Health; Associate Spokesperson for Arts, Culture and Heritage
12	Hon Shane Jones	Spokesperson for Transport; Spokesperson for Infrastructure; Spokesperson for Fisheries; Associate Spokesperson for Māori Affairs (Economic Development)
13	Sue Moroney	Spokesperson for Education
14	Hon Lianne Dalziel	Spokesperson for Commerce; Spokesperson for Small Business; Spokesperson for Regulatory Reform; Spokesperson for Electoral Reform
15	William Sio	Spokesperson for Pacific Island Affairs; Spokesperson for Interfaith Dialogue; Spokesperson for Customs
16	Phil Twyford	Spokesperson for Local Government; Spokesperson for Building and Construction; Spokesperson for Auckland Issues
17	Moana Mackey	Spokesperson for Housing Associate Spokesperson for Research, Science and Technology
18	Jacinda Ardern	Spokesperson for Employment; Spokesperson for Youth Affairs; Associate Spokesperson for Arts, Culture and Heritage
19	Hon Nanaia Mahuta	Spokesperson for Māori Social Development; Spokesperson for the Community and Voluntary Sector
20	Hon Rick Barker	Chief Whip; Spokesperson for Veterans' Affairs; Spokesperson for Courts
21	Hon Damien O'Connor	Spokesperson for Agriculture; Spokesperson for Rural Affairs; Spokesperson for Biosecurity
22	Hon Steve Chadwick	Junior Whip; Spokesperson for Arts, Culture and Heritage; Spokesperson for Senior Citizens; Associate Spokesperson for Health (Aged Care)
23	Darien Fenton	Spokesperson for Labour; Spokesperson for Transport Safety
24	David Shearer	Spokesperson for Research, Science and Technology; Spokesperson for Tertiary Education
25	Stuart Nash	Spokesperson for Revenue; Spokesperson for Forestry; Associate Spokesperson for Trade
26	Chris Hipkins	Spokesperson for ACC; Spokesperson for Internal Affairs
27	Kelvin Davis	Spokesperson for Tourism; Associate Spokesperson for Education (Special Education); Associate Spokesperson for Māori Affairs (Education)
28	Brendon Burns	Spokesperson for Climate Change Spokesperson for Water Associate Spokesperson for the Environment
29	Ross Robertson	Assistant Speaker; Spokesperson for Disarmament and Arms Control; Spokesperson for Racing
30	Carol Beaumont	Spokesperson for Women's Affairs; Spokesperson for Consumer Affairs; Associate Spokesperson for Education (Skills)
31	Clare Curran	Spokesperson for Communications; Spokesperson for Broadcasting
32	Ashraf Choudhary	Spokesperson for Food Safety; Associate Spokesperson for Ethnic Affairs; Associate Spokesperson for Research, Science and Technology
33	Raymond Huo	Spokesperson for Chinese Community Affairs; Spokesperson for Statistics; Spokesperson for the Law Commission
34	Iain Lees-Galloway	Spokesperson for Land Information; Spokesperson for Defence; Associate Spokesperson for Health; Associate Spokesperson for Transport
35	Rajen Prasad	Spokesperson for Ethnic Affairs; Associate Spokesperson for Social Development
36	Mita Ririnui	Associate Spokesperson for Treaty Issues; Associate Spokesperson for Health (Māori)
37	Carmel Sepuloni	Spokesperson for Disability Issues; Spokesperson for Victims' Rights; Associate Spokesperson for Social Development
38	Kris Faafoi	Spokesperson for Civil Defence; Associate Spokesperson for Pacific Island Affairs
39	Hon. Pete Hodgson	
40	Hon. George Hawkins	
41	Lynne Pillay	
42	Louisa Wall	

=== 2008 ===
At the time of announcement, the Opposition spokespersons were as follows:

Rank	Spokesperson	Portfolio
1	Hon Phil Goff	Leader of the Opposition; Spokesperson for the NZ Security Intelligence Service
2	Hon Annette King	Deputy Leader Spokesperson for Social Development
3	Hon David Cunliffe	Spokesperson for Finance
4	Hon Ruth Dyson	Spokesperson for Health
5	Hon Parekura Horomia	Spokesperson for Maori Affairs; Spokesperson for Fisheries
6	Hon Clayton Cosgrove	Spokesperson for Police; Spokesperson for Corrections; Spokesperson for State-Owned Enterprises; Associate Spokesperson for Finance
7	Hon Chris Carter	Spokesperson for Education (Overall; Compulsory); Spokesperson for Ethnic Affairs
8	Hon Nanaia Mahuta	Spokesperson for the Environment; Spokesperson for Tourism; Associate Spokesperson for Maori Affairs
9	Hon Maryan Street	Spokesperson for Trade; Spokesperson for Tertiary Education
10	Hon Darren Hughes	Senior Whip; Spokesperson for Transport
11	Hon David Parker	Shadow Attorney-General; Spokesperson for Electoral Reform; Spokesperson for ACC; Associate Spokesperson for Finance
12	Hon Shane Jones	Spokesperson for Local Government; Spokesperson for Building and Construction; Spokesperson for Infrastructure
13	Hon Trevor Mallard	Spokesperson for Labour; Spokesperson for Economic Development; Spokesperson for Sport and Recreation
14	Hon Lianne Dalziel	Spokesperson for Justice; Spokesperson for Commerce
15	Charles Chauvel	Spokesperson Responsible for Climate Change Issues; Spokesperson for Energy; Associate Spokesperson for Commerce
16	Hon Pete Hodgson	Spokesperson for Immigration; Spokesperson for Defence
–	Rt Hon Helen Clark	Spokesperson for Foreign Affairs; Spokesperson for Arts, Culture and Heritage
–	Hon Michael Cullen	Shadow Leader of the House; Spokesperson for Treaty of Waitangi Negotiations
17	Hon Luamanuvao Winnie Laban	Spokesperson for Pacific Island Affairs; Associate Spokesperson for Health (Aged Care); Associate Spokesperson for Economic Development
18	Moana Mackey	Spokesperson for Rural Affairs; Spokesperson for Research and Development; Spokesperson for Science and Technology
19	Hon Steve Chadwick	Junior Whip; Spokesperson for Conservation
20	Sue Moroney	Spokesperson for Women's Affairs; Spokesperson for Early Childhood Education
21	Hon Rick Barker	Spokesperson for Courts; Spokesperson for Veterans' Affairs
22	Ross Robertson	Spokesperson for Small Business; Spokesperson for Senior Citizens; Spokesperson for Racing; Associate Spokesperson for Disarmament and Arms Control
23	George Hawkins	Spokesperson for Housing
24	Mita Ririnui	Spokesperson for Forestry; Associate Spokesperson for Treaty of Waitangi Negotiations; Associate Spokesperson for Agriculture
25	Lynne Pillay	Spokesperson for Disability Issues; Associate Spokesperson for Justice (Victims Rights)
26	Ashraf Choudhary	Spokesperson for Food Safety; Spokesperson for Agricultural Science; Associate Spokesperson for Ethnic Affairs
27	Darien Fenton	Spokesperson for Transport Safety; Associate Spokesperson for Labour
28	William Sio	Spokesperson for Customs; Associate Spokesperson for Pacific Island Affairs; Associate Spokesperson for Local Government
29	Jacinda Ardern	Spokesperson for Youth Affairs; Associate Spokesperson for Justice (Youth Justice)
30	Carol Beaumont	Spokesperson for Consumer Affairs; Associate Spokesperson for Labour
31	Brendon Burns	Spokesperson for Broadcasting; Associate Spokesperson for the Environment (Water Quality)
32	Clare Curran	Spokesperson for Communication and IT
33	Kelvin Davis	Spokesperson for Biosecurity; Associate Spokesperson for Education
34	Chris Hipkins	Spokesperson for Internal Affairs; Associate Spokesperson for Energy
35	Raymond Huo	Spokesperson Responsible for the Law Commission; Spokesperson for Statistics; Associate Spokesperson for Ethnic Affairs
36	Iain Lees-Galloway	Spokesperson for Land Information; Associate Spokesperson for Defence; Associate Spokesperson for Health (Drugs & Alcohol)
37	Stuart Nash	Spokesperson for Revenue; Associate Spokesperson for Trade; Associate Spokesperson for Forestry
38	Rajen Prasad	Spokesperson for the Voluntary and Community Sector; Associate Spokesperson for Ethnic Affairs; Associate Spokesperson for Social Development and Employment (Family & CYF)
39	Grant Robertson	Spokesperson for State Services; Associate Spokesperson for Arts, Culture, and Heritage; Associate Spokesperson for Foreign Affairs
40	Carmel Sepuloni	Spokesperson for Civil Defence; Associate Spokesperson for Tertiary Education; Associate Spokesperson for Social Development and Employment
41	Phil Twyford	Spokesperson for Disarmament and Arms Control; Spokesperson Responsible for Auckland Issues; Associate Spokesperson for Foreign Affairs (Development Assistance)
–	Hon Jim Anderton	Spokesperson for Agriculture
