= Land Information New Zealand =

New Zealand government department

- Toitū Te Whenua (Māori)

Agency overview
- Formed: 1 July 1996; 29 years ago
- Preceding agency: Department of Survey and Land Information
- Jurisdiction: New Zealand
- Headquarters: Radio New Zealand House, 155 The Terrace, Wellington; WELLINGTON 6011
- Annual budget: Vote Lands; Total budget for 2019/20 ▼$494,024,000
- Minister responsible: Mike Butterick, Minister for Land Information
- Agency executive: Gaye Searancke, Chief Executive
- Child agencies: New Zealand Geospatial Office; Overseas Investment Office; New Zealand Geographic Board
- Website: www.linz.govt.nz

Land Information New Zealand (LINZ; Māori: Toitū Te Whenua) is the public service department of New Zealand charged with geographical information and surveying functions as well as handling land titles, and managing Crown land and property. The minister responsible is the Minister for Land Information, and was formerly the Minister of Survey and Land Information. LINZ was established in 1996 following the restructure of the Department of Survey and Land Information (DOSLI), which was itself one of the successor organisations to the Department of Lands and Survey.

The New Zealand Geographic Board secretariat is part of LINZ and provides the Board with administrative and research assistance and advice.

The Minister for Land Information is Mike Butterick.

Gaye Searancke was appointed Chief Executive of Land Information New Zealand in August 2019. She succeeded Andrew Crisp, who had been in the post since 2016.

== Nature and scope of functions ==
LINZ's purpose is to:

- Maintain and build confidence in property rights in land, geographic and hydrographic information.
- Encourage land information markets to develop and mature.

LINZ has three core roles:

- Transaction management – maintaining and operating the regulatory framework and systems for rights and transactions involving land.
- Information management – generating, collecting, compiling, and providing geographic and hydrographic information, and information relating to property rights and transactions.
- Land management – administering a range of Crown-owned lands for the benefit of the New Zealand public.

=== Transaction management ===
LINZ oversees the regulatory framework and systems for defining, and dealing in, property rights in land. Functions include:

- Maintaining and improving regulatory frameworks used to define and transact land.
- Administering the process by which land is transferred, including creating new titles, and recording changes of ownership and interests in land.
- Providing a secure environment for buying, selling and subdividing land through guaranteed titles for property dealings, and an accurate system of land boundary definition.
- Providing a nationally consistent valuation system for rating purposes.
- Administering New Zealand's inbound investment regime under the Overseas Investment Amendment Act 2018.

=== Information management ===
Beyond defining property rights, LINZ provides databases for New Zealand survey, mapping, hydrographic and property activities. The organisation's geographic information serves a variety of purposes, ranging from supporting essential services such as national security, and emergency service responses, to defining electoral boundaries, and enabling commercial applications. It also assists with local and national government planning and management. LINZ is also the organisation responsible for the surveying and production of all official maritime sea charts and Notices to Mariners covering New Zealand waters and certain areas of Antarctica and the South-West Pacific.

Through the Landonline system, LINZ provides property professionals with online access to New Zealand's title register – the national database of property ownership – and New Zealand's 'cadastre' – the official record of land boundary surveys. Landonline is used by surveyors, lawyers, conveyancers and other professionals to securely search, lodge and update title dealings and survey data, digitally, in real time.

=== Land management ===
LINZ manages almost three million hectares of Crown land, which is around 8% of New Zealand's land area. This includes 1.6 million hectares of high country pastoral land in the South Island, Crown forest land in the North Island, approximately 4,000 properties, and river and lake beds. In managing Crown land, LINZ aims to protect New Zealanders’ interests by putting this land to best use. Functions include:

- The acquisition, management and disposal of Crown land for which LINZ is responsible.
- The management of liabilities arising in relation to Crown land for which LINZ is responsible.
- The framework for disposal of Crown lands by other government agencies.

=== Statutory positions ===
In carrying out these functions, LINZ has a number of statutory officers with specific functions under the various Acts LINZ administer – these are:

- Commissioner of Crown Lands
- Registrar-General of Land
- Surveyor-General, and
- Valuer-General.

In addition, LINZ has special responsibilities relating to land transactions under more than 50 other statutes.

== See also ==
- Overseas Investment Office
- New Zealand Geographic Board
- Surveying in New Zealand
