= David Parker (New Zealand politician) =

New Zealand politician

The Honourable David Parker
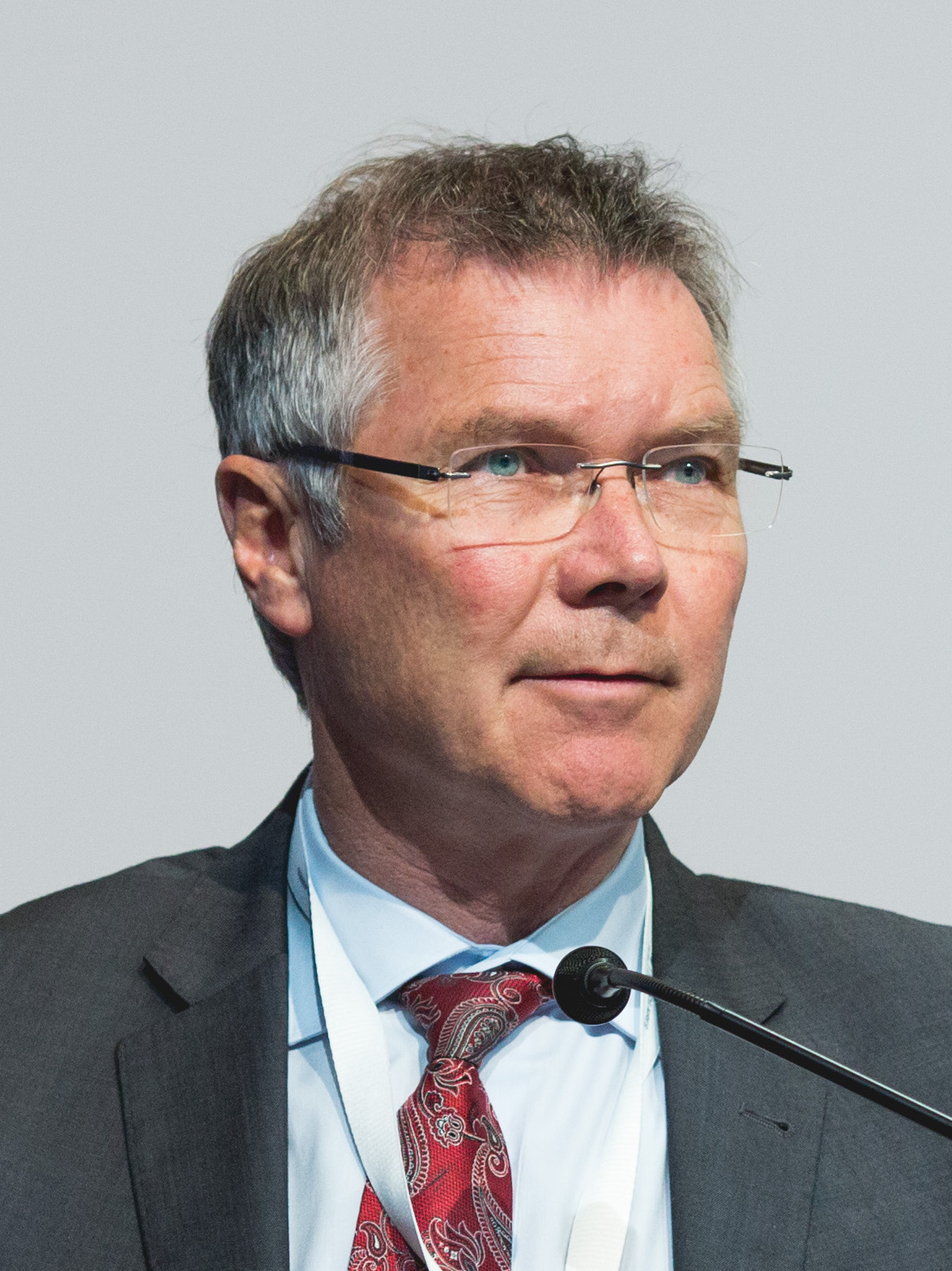
- Parker in 2017

32nd Attorney-General of New Zealand
- In office 26 October 2017 – 27 November 2023
- Prime Minister: Jacinda Ardern; Chris Hipkins
- Preceded by: Chris Finlayson
- Succeeded by: Judith Collins
- In office 19 October 2005 – 20 March 2006
- Prime Minister: Helen Clark
- Preceded by: Michael Cullen
- Succeeded by: Michael Cullen

16th Minister for the Environment
- In office 26 October 2017 – 27 November 2023
- Prime Minister: Jacinda Ardern; Chris Hipkins
- Preceded by: Nick Smith
- Succeeded by: Penny Simmonds

12th Minister for Trade and Export Growth
- In office 26 October 2017 – 6 November 2020
- Prime Minister: Jacinda Ardern
- Preceded by: Todd McClay
- Succeeded by: Damien O'Connor

7th Minister for Economic Development
- In office 26 October 2017 – 27 June 2019
- Prime Minister: Jacinda Ardern
- Preceded by: Simon Bridges
- Succeeded by: Phil Twyford

Deputy Leader of the Opposition
- In office 15 September 2013 – 30 September 2014
- Leader: David Cunliffe
- Preceded by: Grant Robertson
- Succeeded by: Annette King

16th Deputy Leader of the New Zealand Labour Party
- In office 15 September 2013 – 30 September 2014
- Leader: David Cunliffe
- Preceded by: Grant Robertson
- Succeeded by: Annette King

Member of the New Zealand Parliament for Labour Party list
- In office 17 September 2005 – 12 May 2025
- Succeeded by: Vanushi Walters (Note: Normally, list MPs do not have individual predecessors or successors, but Parker resigned during a sitting parliament and therefore was succeeded by Walters.)

Member of the New Zealand Parliament for Otago
- In office 27 July 2002 – 17 September 2005
- Preceded by: Gavan Herlihy
- Succeeded by: Jacqui Dean

Personal details
- Born: 1960 (age 65–66) Roxburgh, New Zealand
- Party: Labour
- Children: 3
- Education: University of Otago
- Occupation: Lawyer

David William Parker (born 1960) is a New Zealand lawyer, businessman and politician who was a Labour Party Member of Parliament from 2002 to 2025.

After a career in law and business, Parker entered Parliament by winning the marginal Otago electorate. He was Attorney-General of New Zealand and a senior Cabinet minister in the Sixth Labour Government between 2017 and 2023, holding the posts of Minister for the Environment, Minister of Transport, Minister for Trade and Export Growth, Minister for Economic Development and Associate Minister of Finance. Parker was also a Cabinet minister in the Fifth Labour Government and a senior figure in the Labour Party opposition between 2008 and 2017, including as deputy leader and interim leader between 2013 and 2014.

== Early life and family ==
David Parker was born in Roxburgh to parents Joan (née Pinfold) and Francis Parker. He is the second of four children and grew up in Dunedin, where he attended Otago Boys' High School. He studied law and business at the University of Otago, graduating with a Bachelor of Commerce in accounting and Bachelor of Laws. While still a student, he co-founded the Dunedin Community Law Centre.

Parker has three children with his ex-wife, the poet Sue Wootton. Since 2011, he has had a relationship with Barbara Ward, a sculptor and Labour Party activist. He lives in Auckland and has a holiday home in Karitane.

== Professional careers ==
Before entering politics, Parker had a career in law and business. He was admitted as a barrister at the High Court in Dunedin on 1 December 1982. His legal career began with general law followed by some time working as a duty solicitor and working in family and environmental law. He was then a resource management law specialist for the firm Anderson Lloyd, based in Queenstown, and a civil litigation specialist and managing partner for the same firm, based in Dunedin.

Parker's business career began with a Dunedin café, the Percolator, which he co-owned and ran with his wife. His Labour MP colleague Pete Hodgson said Parker's decision to leave legal practice and pursue other activities was because the high charges associated with civil litigation work conflicted with Parker's values. Business ventures with Dunedin property developer Russell Hyslop in the late 1990s, including the restoration of Dunedin's St James Theatre (now the Rialto Cinema), were unsuccessful and led to Hyslop's bankruptcy. In 2006, Parker stated that he, too, had considered voluntarily filing for bankruptcy to "take the easy way out", but did not. He returned to legal practice for three years before resuming his business career.

Parker was hired by entrepreneur Howard Paterson as a business manager for his agri-biotechnology ventures. Parker said one of his early roles was to identify commercial opportunities emerging out of universities and Crown Research Institutes and develop corporate structures for them. Companies Parker was involved with, including as inaugural chief executive, included A2 Corporation, Blis Technologies, Botryzen and Pharmazen.

== Fifth Labour Government, 2002–2008 ==
New Zealand Parliament
Years	Term	Electorate	List	Party
2002–2005	47th	Otago	47	Labour
2005–2008	48th	List	37	Labour
2008–2011	49th	List	17	Labour
2011–2014	50th	List	4	Labour
2014–2017	51st	List	2	Labour
2017–2020	52nd	List	10	Labour
2020–2023	53rd	List	9	Labour
2023–2025	54th	List	13	Labour

=== First term, 2002–2005 ===
From about 1999, and spurred by his opposition to then National government's energy reforms, Parker began planning a political career and joined the Labour Party. He was chair of the Dunedin North electorate from 2001 and was selected as Labour candidate in Otago for the 2002 general election. Otago had previously been regarded as a safe National Party seat but was downgraded to marginal when National's support dropped ahead of the election. Ranked an unwinnable 47th place on the party list, and himself not expecting to make it into Parliament, Parker won an upset victory over the incumbent, Gavan Herlihy, by 648 votes.

Parker gave his maiden statement to Parliament on 3 September 2002. In his speech, he addressed infrastructure inaffordability in Queenstown and gave his support to the proposed ability of Queenstown-Lakes District Council to collect a visitor level to fund infrastructure improvements. More than 20 years later, the levy remained only a proposal. Parker's speech also outlined his early views on the economy. He said he supported waste minimisation efforts and suggested that energy consumption and resource depletion should be added to indicators of economic performance, in addition to gross domestic product (GDP). He criticised the governance of the Reserve Bank by Don Brash, who was by then also a first-term MP, saying that the late 1990s "marked the greatest mismanagement of the New Zealand economy" since the days of Sir Robert Muldoon. He further set out his views that the sale of rural land to non-residents should be controlled "very strict[ly]" and that overtime rates should be reintroduced as an incentive for employers to increase employment and decrease the size of the average working week for workers.

Parker's parliamentary roles centred on economic, environmental, and legal portfolios. In his first term, Parker sat on the finance and expenditure committee, the commerce committee, and the regulations review committee. He was promoted in March 2003 to be deputy chair of the local government and environment committee and in February 2005 to be deputy chair of the constitutional arrangements committee.

=== Second term, 2005–2008 ===
While he was unsuccessful in holding Otago against Jacqui Dean in 2005, it was said that Parker lost by a lesser margin than was expected. He was instead re-elected to Parliament on the Labour Party list.

Parker joined the Clark ministry in its third and final term. He was appointed Attorney-General, Minister of Transport, Minister of Energy, and Minister Responsible for Climate Change Issues on 19 October 2005. Parker's appointment as Attorney-General and "a de facto Minister of Infrastructure" in his second term, despite his Otago election defeat, was criticised by the National Party due to his apparent inexperience. Media commentary on Parker's promotion and early days in his portfolios focused on his status as one of the "few lawyers" within Labour, his apparent close relationships with the prime minister and deputy prime minister, and the perception that he was a "rising star" of the party.

Parker resigned from the Cabinet in March 2006 (see § Attorney-General) but was reappointed with the energy, climate change, and land information portfolios that May. In July 2007 prime minister Helen Clark appointed Parker as the acting Minister for the Environment following the resignation of David Benson-Pope. Parker was promoted to Minister of State Services, and thirteenth in the Cabinet, on 5 November 2007. During this first term as a minister, Parker was praised for his policy formulation and attention to detail, and was proposed by commentators as a possible successor to Michael Cullen as finance minister.

==== Attorney-General ====
In his first appointment, Parker was Attorney-General for only 152 days, the shortest tenure of any Attorney-General since the 1920s. In his term, he elevated Noel Anderson to the Supreme Court and appointed William Young president of the Court of Appeal.

In March 2006, Investigate magazine published allegations by Russell Hyslop that Parker had filed an incorrect declaration with the Companies Office regarding the property company Queens Park Mews Limited, the directors of which were Parker, Hyslop, and Parker's father. Parker resigned as Attorney-General on 20 March and resigned from Cabinet the next day. Hyslop's charge was that Parker had failed to consult him over the filing as required by law. An inquiry by the Companies Office cleared him of the charge of filing false returns, due to the fact that Hyslop had previously waived that requirement before declaring bankruptcy in 1997, and it was later waived again by the official assignee responsible for Hyslop's affairs after the bankruptcy. Clark described Parker as having pleaded guilty to something he was innocent of and reappointed him to Cabinet as Minister of Energy, Minister for Land Information, and Minister Responsible for Climate Change Issues on 2 May 2006. Political commentator Colin James wrote of the incident: "[it] must be the world’s first resignation by a minister for something he thought he might conceivably have done but turned out not to have... David Parker is one of the few to end 2006 with reputation enhanced."

==== Other portfolios ====
As energy minister, Parker's priorities were energy supply and competition. Early in his tenure he "ruled out" rolling winter blackouts to manage supply of hydro-generated electricity; however, equipment failures in Auckland led to a significant blackout in 2006. He developed the government's national energy strategy, which was announced in 2007, which had a strong focus on energy sustainability. Power shortages were a persistent trend through Parker's time in the portfolio, with additional gas-generated electricity commissioned to ease demand in 2008. Parker also reiterated New Zealand's commitment to being nuclear free. His proposals to phase out inefficient light bulbs drew criticism of the government's "nanny state" approach, leading Parker to brandish modern energy-efficient bulbs as props during one parliamentary debate.

As climate change minister, Parker announced the cancellation of a proposed carbon tax, pursuant to a coalition agreement between Labour and New Zealand First. In its place, Parker proposed Labour's flagship climate change mitigation policy, the New Zealand Emissions Trading Scheme, which was legislated as the Climate Change Response (Emissions Trading) Amendment Act 2008. For his work in the energy and climate change portfolios, Parker was named 2008 Environmentalist of the Year by The Listener.

In the transport portfolio, Parker opened consultation on possible toll roads in Auckland, described by The New Zealand Herald as the most "courageous" step towards road pricing undertaken in New Zealand. Appointed state services minister in November 2007, Parker immediately came under pressure when it was revealed he, as climate minister, had suggested the environment ministry hire a Labour activist, Clare Curran, as a communications advisor. An investigation by the State Services Commission cleared Parker of charges of inappropriate ministerial direction, although some commentators like the Herald's Fran O'Sullivan and the National Party's Gerry Brownlee were highly critical both of the report's findings as well as of Parker's role and "impatience" in pressuring the environment ministry on a political appointment. As land information minister, he blocked the partial sale of Auckland Airport to the Canada Pension Plan in 2008.

== Opposition, 2008–2017 ==
=== Third term, 2008–2011 ===
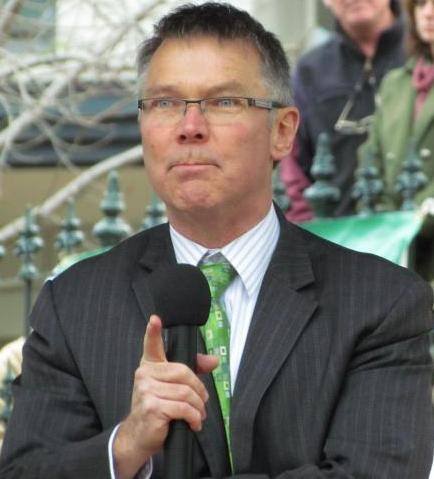
Parker in 2011

Parker was defeated by Dean in the new Waitaki electorate in 2008. He was re-elected to Parliament on the Labour Party list.

Following Labour's defeat in the 2008 general election, Parker was named spokesperson for ACC and electoral reform, shadow attorney-general, and associate spokesperson for finance in the shadow Cabinet of Phil Goff. The conservation portfolio was added to Parker's workload in 2009 and replaced with economic development in 2010. In 2011, ahead of that year's election, Parker was elevated to fourth in the Labour caucus and also assigned the energy portfolio. He led Labour's campaign against the National government's proposed sale of state-owned electricity companies, which resulted in a win at a 2013 referendum but did not prevent any asset sales. He also promoted, for the first time for the Labour Party, a capital gains tax and retirement age increase.

=== Fourth term, 2011–2014 ===
After the breakdown of his marriage in 2009, Parker moved to Auckland where he unsuccessfully contested the Epsom electorate in 2011. He was instead re-elected to Parliament on the Labour Party list.

Parker was increasingly seen as a leading figure within the Labour Party. He was described as a top performer in opposition and the "frontrunner" in the party's November 2011 leadership election due to his role developing the party's policies for that year's general election, much of which was seen as moving the party more towards the political left. Critics of Parker saw him as bookish and boring with an understated sense of humour. Parker did enter the leadership election, but withdrew partway through the contest to support David Shearer's bid. It was reported that he withdrew because a key backer, Grant Robertson, had shifted his allegiance to Shearer, who defeated David Cunliffe in the election and appointed Parker as the finance spokesperson. By July 2013, Parker had become critical of Shearer's leadership. With six other senior MPs, he challenged Shearer to improve. Shearer resigned six weeks later. Cunliffe took over as leader on 15 September 2013; Parker became deputy leader and continued as finance spokesperson and shadow attorney-general.

=== Fifth term, 2014–2017 ===
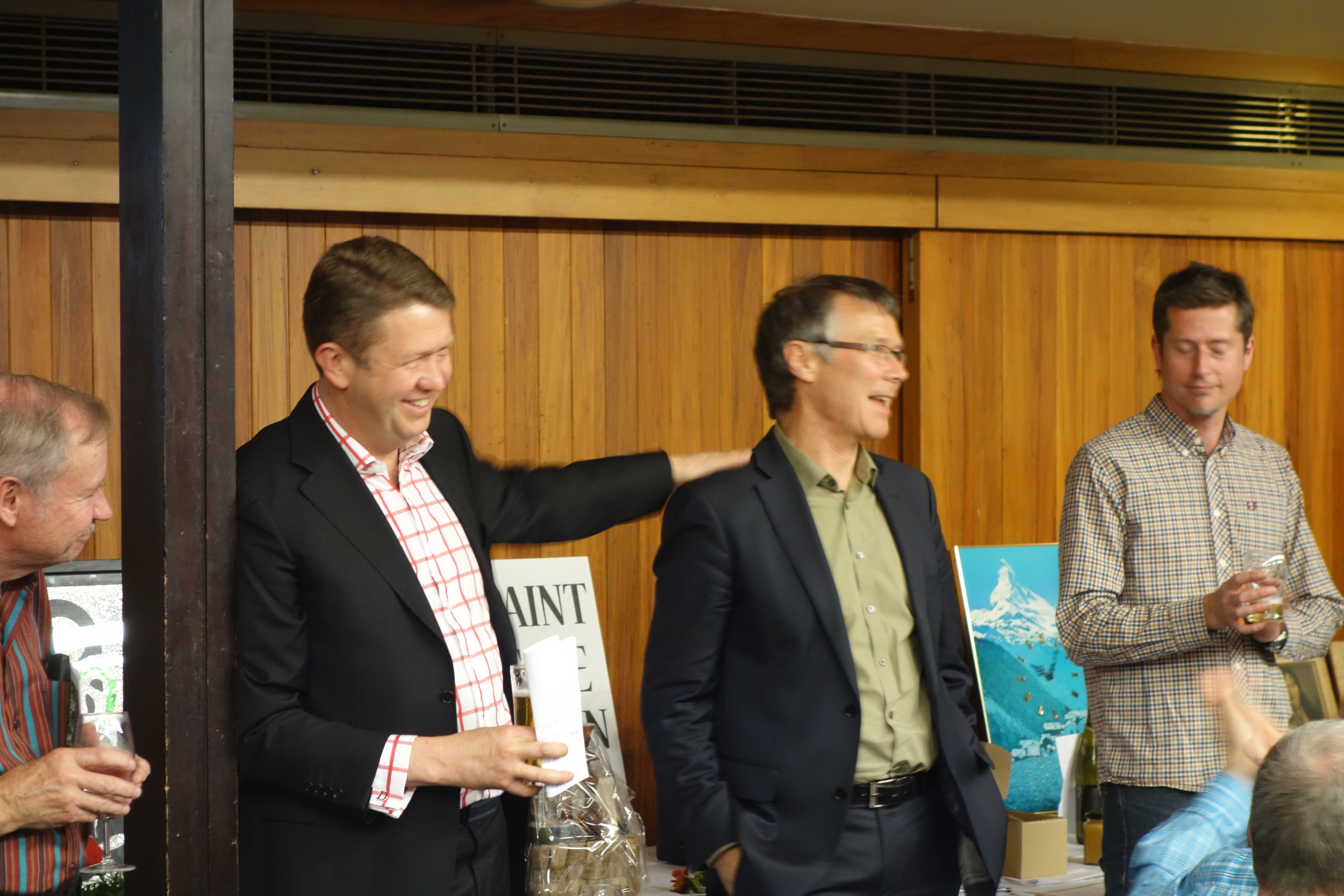
Deputy Labour leader David Parker, second from right, pictured with leader David Cunliffe in October 2013

Parker was elected as a Labour Party list-only candidate at the 2014 New Zealand general election.

Following the poor performance of the Labour Party in the 2014 general election, and Cunliffe's resignation as leader, Parker was appointed interim leader of the Labour Party. He initially ruled himself out of the ensuing leadership election, but changed his mind. Although he was seen as a frontrunner in the race, he finished third. New leader Andrew Little offered for Parker to continue as finance spokesperson, but Parker declined. Little had campaigned on doing away with Parker's economic policies from the previous election, like a capital gains tax and raising the retirement age. Instead, Parker was assigned a range of portfolios including shadow attorney-general and spokesperson for trade and export growth, the environment and, after the resignations of former leaders Goff and Shearer, foreign affairs.

As spokesperson for trade and foreign affairs between 2015 and 2017, Parker prosecuted allegations that foreign affairs minister Murray McCully had deliberately misrepresented an arrangement with businessman Sheikh Hmood Al Ali Al Khalaf. It emerged that McCully had sourced government funding for the development of an "agribusiness hub" promoting New Zealand agriculture in Saudi Arabia, including secret "facilitation payments" of more than $4 million, seemingly to prevent the sheik from suing the New Zealand government. The deal circumvented a ban on live sheep exports for slaughter the sheik disagreed with and was also an attempt by McCully to try to secure Saudi Arabia's agreement to a New Zealand–Gulf Cooperation Council free trade agreement (NZGCC FTA). Parker referred the matter to Auditor-General Lyn Provost, who investigated and found that while there was "no evidence of corruption," the deal amounted to "the settlement of a grievance... provided under the guise of a contract for services [which did] not specifically reflect the settlement component relating to the grievance." Parker cancelled the arrangement as trade minister in 2019. NZGCC FTA negotiations resumed in 2022 under Parker's successor, Damien O'Connor, and were signed in October 2024.

Parker was responsible for three member's bills in the 2014–2017 term. In 2015 and 2016, he proposed the Minimum Wage (Contractor Remuneration) Amendment Bill, which sought to ensure contract workers could not be remunerated below minimum wage. Although the bill passed its first and second readings, it was voted down in the Committee of the Whole House when Peter Dunne withdrew his support. In June 2016, he took over the Keep Kiwibank Bill from Clayton Cosgrove for its second reading. The bill was defeated by the National-led government, which said it had no intention of selling the bank. The Ombudsmen (Cost Recovery) Amendment Bill was defeated in May 2017.

== Sixth Labour Government, 2017–2023 ==
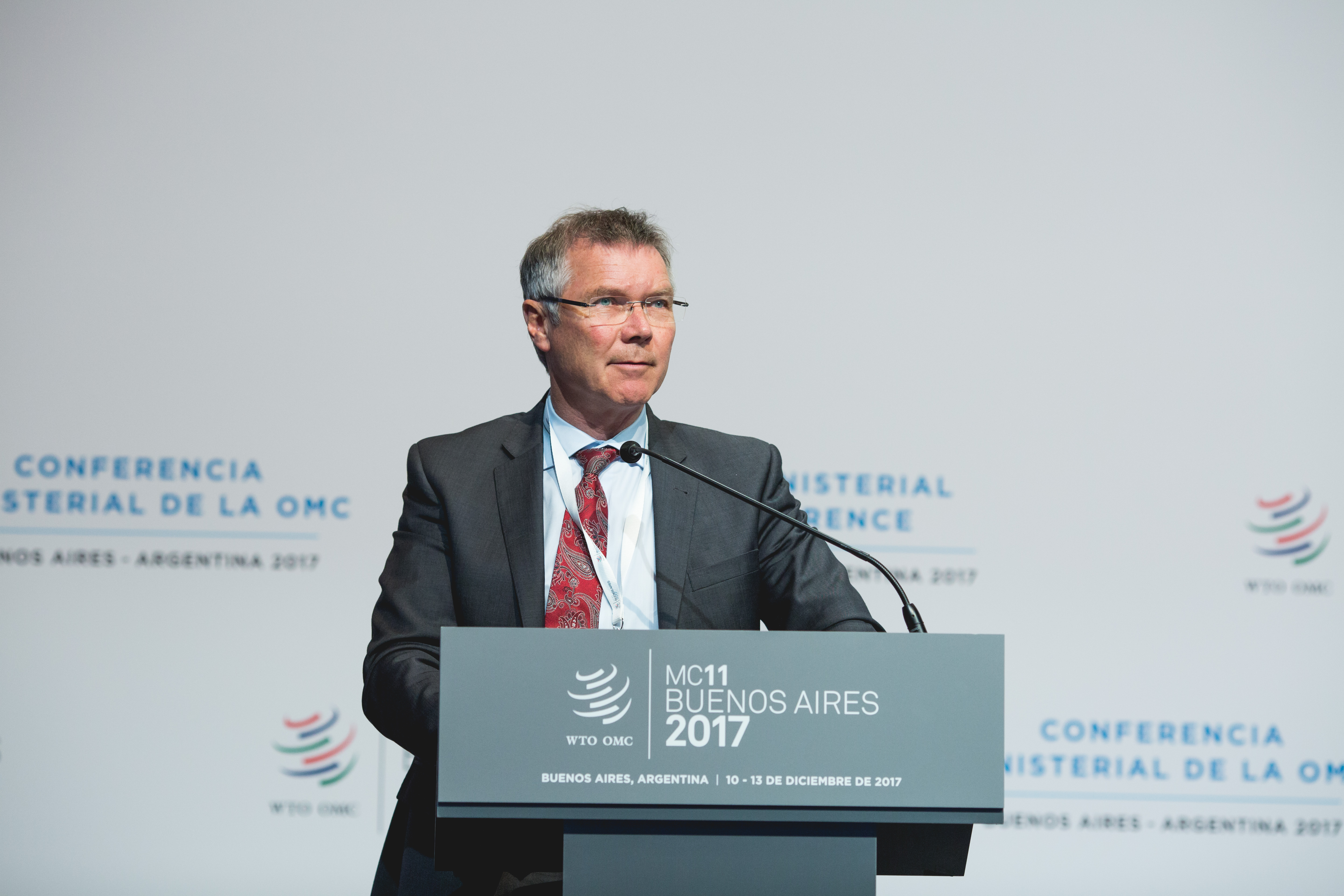
As Minister of Economic Development, Parker addresses the WTO Ministerial Conference, 11 December 2017

During the 2017 and 2020 New Zealand general elections, Parker was re-elected to Parliament on the Labour Party list. In 2017, he unsuccessfully contested the Epsom electorate.

Following the formation of the Labour–New Zealand First coalition government, Parker was sworn in for a second appointment as Attorney-General and also became Minister for Economic Development, Minister for the Environment, and Minister for Trade and Export Growth. He also became Associate Minister of Finance. The depth and breadth of his portfolios led him to be described as "the minister of almost everything", an epithet that had previously been given to Sir Michael Cullen. Parker was seen as a trusted confidante of the prime minister, Jacinda Ardern, and was remarked as having a close relationship with the deputy prime minister, New Zealand First leader Winston Peters. Chess international master and journalist Vernon Small was brought on as Parker's press secretary.

Parker's economic development portfolio was reassigned to Phil Twyford in June 2019; Ardern said this was so Parker could focus more on domestic water quality proposals and free trade negotiations with the European Union and United Kingdom. In the Labour government's second term, from October 2020, he was reappointed as Attorney-General, Minister for the Environment, and Associate Minister of Finance. He also became Minister for Oceans and Fisheries, Minister of Revenue and, briefly in 2023, Minister of Transport. Several commentators saw him as a candidate for foreign affairs minister in 2020; that role instead went to Nanaia Mahuta.

On 28 February 2022, Parker became the first New Zealand Member of Parliament to test positive for COVID-19.

=== Attorney-General ===
During his second period as Attorney-General, Parker made three appointments to the Supreme Court of New Zealand. With prime minister Ardern, Parker oversaw the appointment of Dame Helen Winkelmann as Chief Justice—the first such appointment since the creation of the Supreme Court in 2004—in November 2018. Parker also announced the elevation to the Supreme Court of Sir Joseph Williams in May 2019 and of Sir Stephen Kós in April 2022.

In May 2020, as Attorney-General, Parker led the passage of the COVID-19 Public Health Response Act 2020 (the PHRA) through Parliament. This provided the legal framework for the Government's efforts to combat COVID-19. Shortly before the bill was introduced, Parker gave a lengthy Facebook Live address where he addressed and refuted the claim that the government's lockdown direction was unenforceable; the High Court later found that while this was justified, it was not lawful for the first nine days. In an address to the New Zealand Centre for Public Law in December 2021, Parker reflected on the legal framework for managing COVID-19. He said that in his view, the PHRA served New Zealand well until the emergence of the SARS-CoV-2 Delta variant in 2021.

In November 2021, Parker chaired the annual meeting of attorneys-general from Australia, Canada, New Zealand, the United Kingdom, and the United States. In 2022, he progressed the New Zealand Bill of Rights (Declarations of Inconsistency) Amendment Bill, which required if Supreme Court finds a law to be inconsistent with the New Zealand Bill of Rights Act that the issue be returned to Parliament.

=== Environment portfolios ===
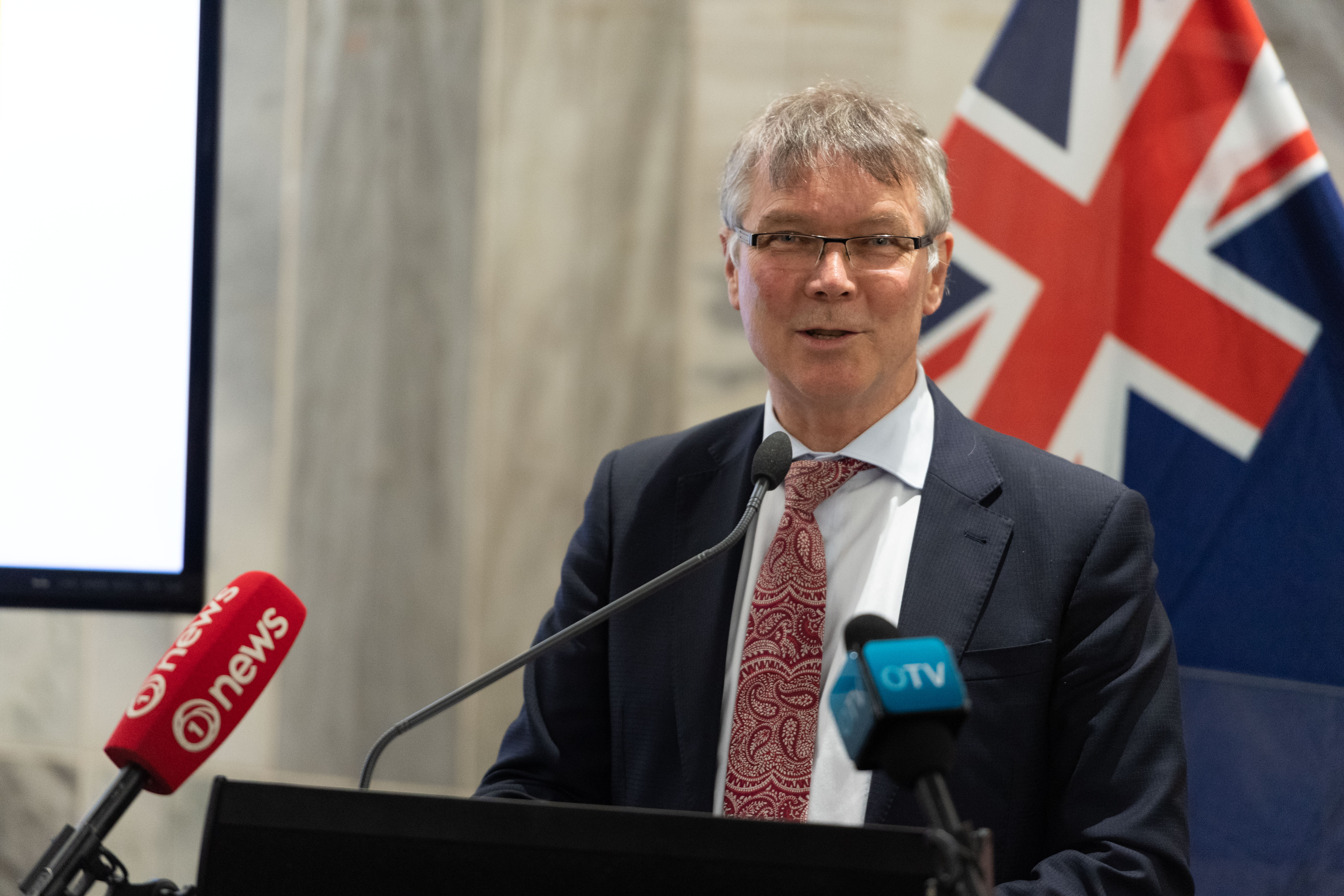
Parker addresses New Zealand students accepted as NASA interns, 13 May 2019

As environment minister, Parker oversaw a "comprehensive overhaul" of the Resource Management Act 1991 (RMA). He appointed retired judge Tony Randerson, who had previously been on a review panel for the RMA before its enactment, to make recommendations about the future direction for resource management. Parker led the government's development of new policy and two new laws: the Natural and Built Environment Act 2023 and the Spatial Planning Act 2023. Both bills were introduced into parliament on 14 November 2022 and passed into law on 16 August 2023. Parker said his rationale for replacing the RMA was that it had become too complex and expensive, without adequately protecting water quality or decreasing carbon emissions. The legislation was repealed in January 2024 after a change of government.

Parker launched the government's freshwater policy statement in September 2019, which aimed to improve water quality in lakes and rivers. A report Parker had commissioned the previous year had found significant water quality issues, including increases of nitrates and E. coli. By 2020, another report showed that water quality had not improved in nearly half of monitoring sites. Tighter water quality regulations, including controls on winter grazing of stock, were enacted in 2020 and these were soon described as "onerous" and "unworkable" by farming lobbyists. However, environmental advocates like Mike Joy said Parker's regulations were insufficient at addressing nitrate pollution. Following the change of government in 2023, the winter grazing rules are expected to be repealed by the end of 2024.

As the first minister in the new oceans and fisheries portfolio, Parker launched the government's sustainable oceans strategy in a pair of speeches to Forest & Bird in June 2021 and Auckland University in June 2022. During two years in the portfolio, he launched a marine protected area in the Hauraki Gulf and reformed fisheries legislation. He passed the portfolio to Stuart Nash in February 2023, and held it briefly again after Nash's dismissal from the executive in March 2023.

In March 2023, Parker used his discretionary powers as environment minister to dismiss Rob Campbell as chair of the Environment Protection Authority following the latter's criticism of the National Party's opposition of the Three Waters reform programme, which breached the Public Service Commission's neutrality policy.

=== Economic and trade portfolios ===
Parker was Minister for Economic Development from October 2017 to June 2019. In the 2019 budget, he announced a new $300 million venture capital fund, administered in a similar way as the New Zealand Superannuation Fund. Parker said the intention of the fund is to increase productivity and generate revenue to fund future superannuation. After leaving the economic development portfolio, Parker was continued as the responsible minister for the venture capital fund through his associate finance delegation. He said in 2023 that the fund had already generated $1 billion total market capital available for start-up companies. Parker's finance delegation also included responsibility on behalf of the Minister of Finance for the Overseas Investment Act 2005. In August 2018, Parker led the passage of the Overseas Investment Amendment Act 2018, that banned the sale of existing residential property in New Zealand to foreign buyers.

As trade minister between 2017 and 2020, Parker's trade strategy centered on defending the rules-based system for international trade led by the World Trade Organization and embedding New Zealand within Asia-Pacific free trade agreements. On 8 March 2018, he signed the Comprehensive and Progressive Agreement for Trans-Pacific Partnership on behalf of New Zealand. In October 2018, he led New Zealand's ratification of the PACER Plus agreement. He also worked with Liz Truss, then the United Kingdom Secretary of State for International Trade, on the development of a United Kingdom–New Zealand free trade agreement. In 2019, Parker announced government support for Saudi Arabia "agri-hub" he had questioned, and described as a bribe, in Opposition had been cancelled. Parker's final engagement as trade minister was a speech addressing global challenges to the OECD on 9 October 2020.

=== Revenue portfolio ===
Parker became revenue minister in October 2020, having requested to hold the portfolio. He was responsible for legislating the government's Budget 2022 "cost of living" payment scheme for low-income individuals, but faced criticism for the scheme's poor implementation. Around the same time, he proposed adding goods and services tax to KiwiSaver account fees but the proposal was dropped due to widespread criticism. Parker said the proposal would have made the tax system more consistent, but opponents accused it of "eating into" retirement savings. New Zealand Herald columnist Audrey Young said these incidents showed Parker's difficulty at seeing political risk.

Parker also conducted work on tax inequality, which he said was his main priority in the portfolio and was inspired by reading Thomas Piketty's Capital in the Twenty-First Century. In April 2022, Parker gave a speech titled "Shining a light on unfairness in our tax system," which set out his belief that New Zealand no longer has a progressive tax system. In the speech, he said: "the effective marginal tax rate for middle income Kiwis is generally higher than it is for their wealthiest citizens. Indeed, some of their wealthier Kiwi compatriots pay very low rates of tax on most of their income." One year later, he released research from the Inland Revenue Department that found New Zealand's wealthiest families pay less than half the amount of tax, across all forms of income, than most other New Zealanders. Parker said the "internationally ground-breaking research" revealed a "large differential between the tax rates ordinary New Zealanders pay on their full income compared with the super-wealthy". Piketty responded to the report saying New Zealand should institute a wealth tax.

Following on from these findings, in May 2023, Parker introduced the Tax Principles Reporting Bill that proposes an ongoing reporting framework for fairness in the tax system. The relevant principles were horizontal equity, efficiency, vertical equity, revenue integrity, compliance and administrative costs, certainty and predictability, and flexibility and adaptability. The bill, which passed its third reading in August 2023, was described by National Party opponents as "David Parker's pet envy project." It was repealed under urgency by the incoming National government in December 2023, days before the first report was due to be published. Despite the repeal, the Inland Revenue Department published a draft of the report on its website; the report presented factual information about the tax system without making recommendations.

Parker resigned his role as revenue minister on 24 July 2023, describing remaining in the position as "untenable," after prime minister Chris Hipkins said Labour would not introduce a wealth tax policy that Parker had spent several years developing. Parker also refused to say whether he thought Hipkins' preferred tax policy (removing goods and services tax on fresh fruits and vegetables) was workable. His stance was criticised by The New Zealand Herald's Claire Trevett as "an ill-timed bout of personal principle that carries a whiff of petulance and selfishness" that came in the lead-up to an election and amid several other resignations of Cabinet ministers for various scandals, but was praised by former revenue minister Peter Dunne as the correct decision and by journalist Simon Wilson for being a rare act of principle.

== In opposition, 2023–2025 ==
During the 2023 New Zealand general election, Parker was re-elected to Parliament on the Labour party list. He broke his leg in late 2023 and was unable to travel to Parliament to be sworn in; instead the Clerk of the House traveled to Dunedin to administer Parker's oath remotely.

After the election, Parker initially refused to endorse Chris Hipkins to continue as leader in opposition, but ruled out challenging him directly. Hipkins retained the leadership and appointed Parker as Labour's shadow attorney-general and spokesperson on foreign affairs and electoral reform. He was also reappointed as chair of the regulations review committee, holding that role from January 2024 until April 2025. Following a cabinet reshuffle in early March 2025, Parker retained his foreign affairs and shadow attorney-general portfolios but lost his electoral reform one.

Parker was an active contributor to Labour's policy work on the tax system despite not having a finance or revenue portfolio. In 2024 it was reported that Parker had given a speech to party members where he proposed a "capital income tax." Hipkins said the party was still developing its tax policy, and was considering a capital gains tax, a wealth tax, a combination of the two, and a land value tax.

At the party conference in December 2024, delegates rejected a remit that Parker had promoted to adopt a wealth tax policy; instead, they agreed for the party to do more work that would let it choose between a capital gains tax and wealth tax in the future. Politik editor Richard Harman wrote that Hipkins and Labour's finance spokesperson Barbara Edmonds both preferred a capital gains tax and described the decision not to agree a wealth tax as a defeat for Parker. In contrast, Audrey Young wrote for the New Zealand Herald that Parker was a "principled martyr" and had "effectively won" by getting agreement to campaign on some form of tax reform.

On 8 April 2025, Parker announced that he would resign from Parliament in May 2025. He denied that his decision was related to internal party disputes on tax policy. Parker gave his valedictory speech in Parliament on 7 May, and his resignation took effect at 1 pm on 12 May. He was succeeded as a list MP, and as Labour's shadow attorney-general, by human rights lawyer Vanushi Walters.

== Political views ==
Parker is on the left of the Labour Party. He has been described as an "ardent progressive" and once self-described himself as an "agent of progressive change." Consistently through his career, he has described himself as an egalitarian politician. He voted in support of civil unions in 2004 (the Civil Union Bill) and gay marriage in 2013 (the Marriage (Definition of Marriage) Amendment Bill). He voted against legalising voluntary euthanasia in 2003, but voted for the End of Life Choice Bill in 2019. In 2019, he stated a personal view that the sale of fireworks should be limited to only the days around Matariki rather than Guy Fawkes Night. He has also given his support to a four-year electoral cycle, rather than the current three-year parliamentary term, but prefers keeping the voting age and drinking age at 18.

=== Peter Ellis case ===
In 2003, Parker supported a petition calling for the government to hold a royal commission of inquiry to review the case of Peter Ellis. A parliamentary committee reviewed the petition and rejected the petitioners' call for a commission of inquiry, concluding that it was not practical to hold such an inquiry. Ellis's case was eventually heard by the Supreme Court which found in his favour; in 2021, North & South argued that without Parker's 2019 appointment of Sir Joseph Williams to the court it is unlikely the case would have been successful. In terms of the reach of the senior courts, Parker said that he is "concerned when judicial activism goes too far and amounts to lawmaking, which should be left to Parliament." He co-authored the Labour Party policy, later the New Zealand Bill of Rights (Declarations of Inconsistency) Amendment Act 2022, which set out that when the Supreme Court finds a law to be inconsistent with the New Zealand Bill of Rights Act that the issue be returned to Parliament.

=== Israel–Palestine ===
Parker is opposed to Israeli occupation of the West Bank and supports the creation and international recognition of a Palestinian state. He has been outspoken on these views since 2003. As Labour's foreign affairs spokesperson in 2024, he wrote to foreign affairs minister Winston Peters requesting the government officially recognise Palestine, which Peters rejected, and opposed the government's deployment of New Zealand soldiers into the Red Sea crisis.

=== Economic views ===
French economist Thomas Piketty has been a strong influence on Parker's economic views. In a speech following one by Piketty at the OECD in 2020, Parker said he became a Piketty "disciple" after reading Capital in the Twenty-First Century. In 2023, Parker described Capital to The Spinoff as the book "everyone should read" because it demonstrated how wealth is being concentrated among very few individuals and that this has largely been missed because of a lack of sufficient, accurate data-based monitoring. Parker said of Piketty, "he has written some of the most important economic analysis of the problems of the world in the last couple of decades." When Parker was an opposition spokesperson on finance, Labour campaigned on a capital gains tax in both the 2011 and 2014 elections. Later, he was a proponent of a tax on wealth above $5m (the wealthiest 0.5% of New Zealanders). After retiring from Parliament in 2025, Parker told the Sunday Star-Times that he supported a "tax switch" policy where income taxes are decreased in favour of introducing a capital gains tax, an annual wealth tax, and an inheritance tax (on inheritance greater than $1m).

== Notes ==
Political offices
Preceded by Pete Hodgson	Minister for Land Information; 2006–2008	Succeeded by Richard Worth
Preceded by Michael Cullen	Attorney-General; 2005–2006; 2017–2023	Succeeded by Michael Cullen
Preceded by Chris Finlayson	Attorney-General; 2005–2006; 2017–2023	Succeeded by Judith Collins
Preceded by Nick Smith	Minister for the Environment; 2017–2023	Succeeded by Penny Simmonds
Preceded by Todd McClay	Minister for Trade and Export Growth; 2017–2020	Succeeded by Damien O'Connor
Preceded by Simon Bridges	Minister of Economic Development; 2017–2019	Succeeded by Phil Twyford
Preceded by Grant Robertson	Deputy Leader of the Opposition; 2013–2014	Succeeded by Annette King
New Zealand Parliament
Preceded by Gavan Herlihy	Member of Parliament for Otago; 2002–2005	Succeeded by Jacqui Dean
Party political offices
Preceded by Grant Robertson	Deputy Leader of the Labour Party; 2013–2014	Succeeded by Annette King
