= Timaru Customs House =

Customs House
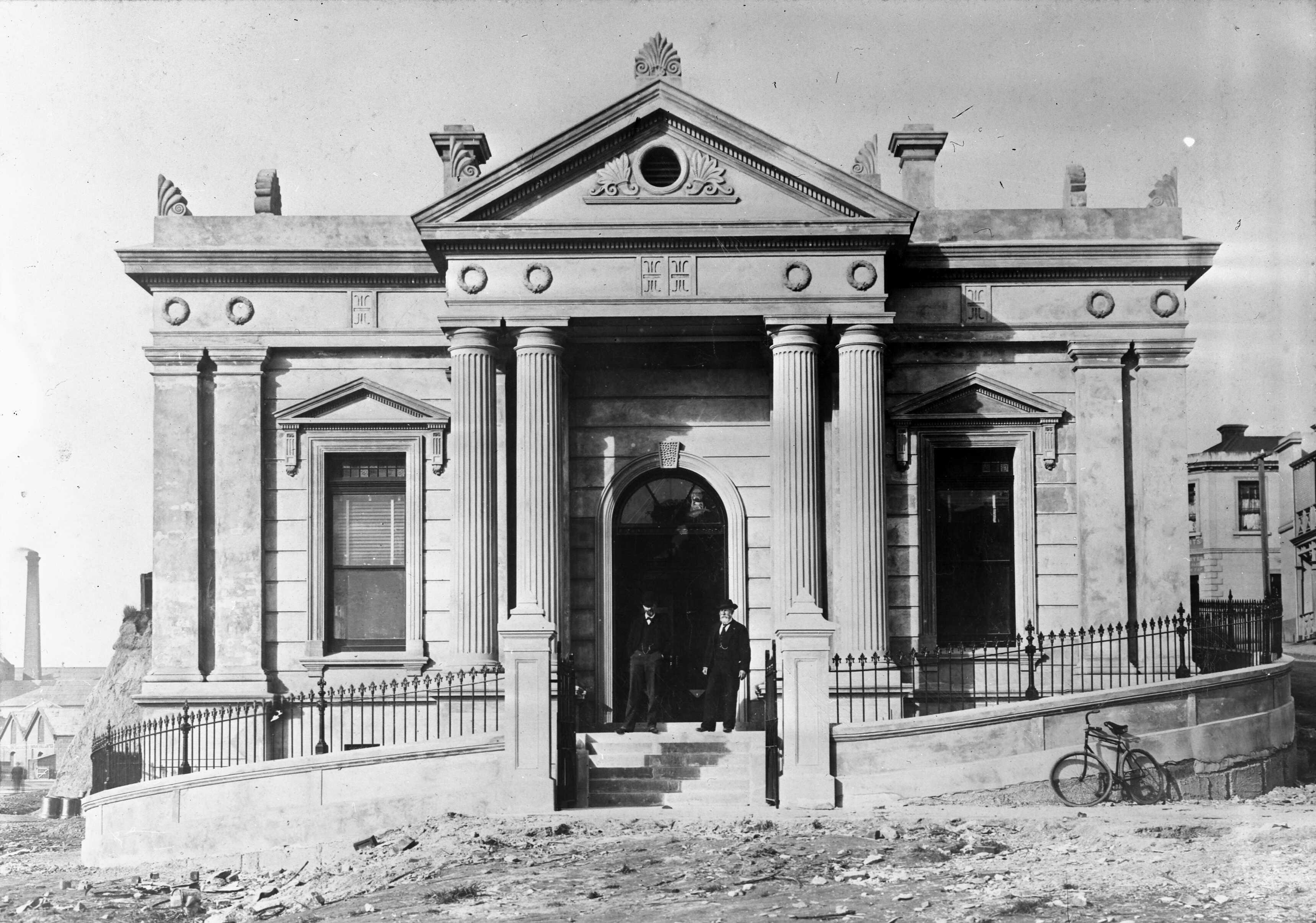
- Customs House c.1902

General information
- Type: Customs house
- Architectural style: Neoclassical
- Location: Timaru, 2 Strathallan Street, Cains Terrace and Station Street, New Zealand
- Year built: 1901–1902
- Cost: £1,944
- Owner: Timaru Civic Trust
- Affiliation: Timaru Port

Technical details
- Size: 552 m^{2} (660 sq yd)
- Floor count: 192 m^{2} (230 sq yd)

Design and construction
- Architect: Daniel West
- Main contractor: Thomas Pringle

Heritage New Zealand – Category 1
- Designated: 9 September 1983
- Reference no.: 324

Customs House is a historic neoclassical building in Timaru, New Zealand. Opened in 1902 it served the Customs Department until the 1970s. It later became a restaurant and has a category 1 registration with Heritage New Zealand.

== Description ==
Customs House is a neoclassical building with Doric design. Designed by Daniel West. It is located on Cains Terrace and Station Street and fronts out onto Strathallan Street. The building is surrounded by a concrete wall and metal fence. It is constructed from brick which is plastered with cement. The entrance is under a portico supported by four fluted pillars and topped off with a pediment alongside two pediments on each side of the building. Pilasters are used to ornament the façade and support the frieze. All windows have a pediment bead. The gabled roof is hidden by a parapet, with acroteria atop it and the pediments. A flagpole is mounted to the portico, which was added after construction at unknown date, alongside the removal of the chimneys. The site is 552 m^{2} (660 sq yd) and the floor space is 192 m^{2} (230 sq yd).

The interior originally had a lobby, to the left was the collector's room, to the right the tide-waiter's room, and at the end of the lobby the long room with a storeroom. The interior has cornices and skirting boards. The ceilings are well detailed with ornamentation.

== History ==
Since 1880 the Collector of Customs in Timaru was based out of the Timaru Post Office. On 12 September 1901, tenders were called for a Customs House between Cains Terrace and Station Street. A tender of £1,944 by Thomas Pringle was accepted. After opening the Timaru Herald stated the workmanship of the building was a great reflection of the craftsmanship of the contractor and his assistants. The building opened in August 1902.

In the early 1970s the State Services Commission had proposed moving the Customs Department out of the building to new premises. The Timaru Collector of Customs did not want to have the premises moved arguing that the location near the port and railway line made their business easier and more convenient for both the workers and those who had to deal with the Customs Department. One worker stated that 'being cooed up like hens in battery cages gives [workers] a pinheaded outlook on life, where as in a building with space and character, suchs as the Customs House, expansive thinking is promoted.' One author wrote about how he deplored the 'modern fetish of pulling fine old buildings down to be replaced by concrete boxes.' Despite the backlash the Customs Department was moved out in 1976. The building was transferred to the Lands and Survey Department who were responsible for disposing of surplus buildings. Charles Russell Hervey, the Mayor of Timaru, said the council was open to having the building being retained and that a maritime museum could be one option for the building. Ultimately neither the Timaru City Council nor the New Zealand Historic Places Trust accepted the offer from the Lands and Survey Department. In May 1981, the Commissioner of Crown Land proceeded with disposing of the property. The price was set at $50,000, despite the interest in the building no sale took place until early 1983. Despite the new owner, the building remained unused until Paul and Rien Cox, restaurateurs from Akaroa, visited Timaru in 1985 and decided on purchasing it. The two cousins had managed an eatery out of the Akaroa shipping office. Following the purchase the building underwent restoration work before the building opened as a restaurant in August 1985.

In 2018 the Timaru Civic Trust purchased the building. It is still operated as a restaurant.
