= Chris Carter (New Zealand politician) =

New Zealand politician

The Honourable Chris Carter
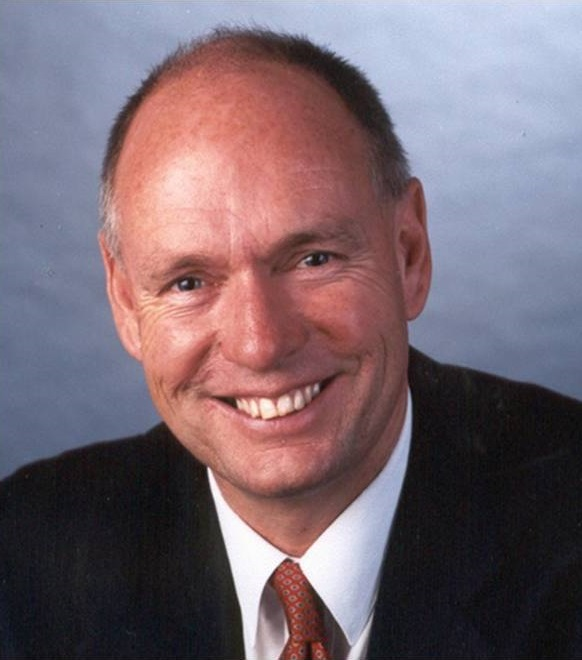

43rd Minister of Education
- In office 5 November 2007 – 19 November 2008
- Prime Minister: Helen Clark
- Preceded by: Steve Maharey
- Succeeded by: Anne Tolley

21st Minister of Housing
- In office 19 October 2005 – 5 November 2007
- Prime Minister: Helen Clark
- Preceded by: Steve Maharey
- Succeeded by: Maryan Street

2nd Minister for Building Issues
- In office 21 December 2004 – 19 October 2005
- Prime Minister: Helen Clark
- Preceded by: Margaret Wilson
- Succeeded by: Clayton Cosgrove

8th Minister of Conservation
- In office 15 August 2002 – 5 November 2007
- Prime Minister: Helen Clark
- Preceded by: Sandra Lee
- Succeeded by: Stephanie Chadwick

11th Minister of Local Government
- In office 15 August 2002 – 19 October 2005
- Prime Minister: Helen Clark
- Preceded by: Sandra Lee
- Succeeded by: Nanaia Mahuta

Member of the New Zealand Parliament for Te Atatu
- In office 27 November 1999 – 30 September 2011
- Preceded by: Seat recreated
- Succeeded by: Phil Twyford
- In office 6 November 1993 – 12 October 1996
- Preceded by: Brian Neeson
- Succeeded by: Seat abolished

Personal details
- Born: 4 May 1952 (age 74) Auckland, New Zealand
- Party: Labour
- Domestic partner: Peter Kaiser
- Education: University of Auckland
- Profession: Teacher

Christopher Joseph Carter JP (born 4 May 1952) is a former New Zealand Labour Party and independent Member of the New Zealand Parliament. He was a senior Cabinet Minister in the Fifth Labour Government of New Zealand, serving lastly as Minister of Education, Minister Responsible for the Education Review Office and Minister of Ethnic Affairs. He was the Member of Parliament for the Te Atatu electorate, where he was first elected in 1993. He did not win re-election (to the replacement seat, Waipareira) in 1996, but won a new and expanded Te Atatu seat in 1999. In 2010, he was suspended from the Labour Party caucus following a dispute with party leader Phil Goff, shortly afterwards he became an independent MP. He was expelled by the Labour Party for breaching the Party's constitution in bringing the Party in disrepute, on 11 October 2010. In September 2011 Carter resigned from Parliament following his appointment to a United Nations position in Afghanistan where he served for 4 years. In 2015 he was appointed to head UN operations in Rakhine State in Myanmar where he served for 3 years. In 2018 he rejoined the New Zealand Labour Party and stood for election as a Labour Party representative in the 2019 New Zealand local elections. Carter was elected and appointed as Chairperson of the Henderson Massey Local Board with 11,250 votes. He also won election in 2019 as one of the seven elected board members of the Waitemata District Health Board with 14,593 votes. Both positions have three year terms.

== Early and personal life ==
Carter was born on 4 May 1952, and brought up in the Auckland suburb of Panmure. He was educated at St Peter's College, Auckland and at the University of Auckland where he received an MA (Hons) in history.

Before entering politics, Carter had served as a teacher and as a poultry farmer. His partner is Peter Kaiser, a headmaster, and they have been together for over 40 years. On 10 February 2007, Carter and Kaiser were joined in the first civil union for a Cabinet Minister or Member of Parliament since civil unions in New Zealand were introduced after legislation was passed in December 2004.

== Member of Parliament ==
New Zealand Parliament
Years	Term	Electorate	List	Party
1993–1996	44th	Te Atatu		Labour
1999–2002	46th	Te Atatu	34	Labour
2002–2005	47th	Te Atatu	25	Labour
2005–2008	48th	Te Atatu	19	Labour
2008–2010	49th	Te Atatū	7	Labour
2010–2011	Changed allegiance to:			Independent

At the 1987 election Carter stood unsuccessfully as the Labour Party candidate in the Albany electorate, losing to National's Don McKinnon. In a local-body election in 1988 he stood as a candidate for the Te Atatu ward of the Auckland Regional Authority, but was unsuccessful. He placed third out of six candidates. In the lead up to the 1990 election he contested the Labour nomination for the seat of Te Atatu. One of six contenders, he emerged one of the two front-runners alongside news service manager Dan McCaffrey. At the selection meeting McCaffrey was successful.

At the 1993 election he stood as the Labour candidate for Te Atatu and won the seat. In 1993 he was appointed Labour's spokesperson for Ethnic Affairs. In 1994, Carter was named by the Speaker of the House Peter Tapsell for calling John Banks a hypocrite over his anti-abortion stance on abortions.

The Te Atatu seat was abolished for the 1996 election and he lost the newly created Waipareira electorate to National's Brian Neeson by just 107 votes, and not having been placed on the Labour list for the election.

After losing his seat, Carter started one of the first branches of New Zealand Rainbow Labour for centre-left lesbians, gays, bisexuals, transgender people (LGBT) and others during the 1996–1999 term. At the 1999 election the Te Atatu seat was recreated and he won the seat once again. From 1999 to 2002 he was Labour's junior whip.

After being re-elected in 2002 Carter was elevated to cabinet and was appointed Minister of Conservation, Minister of Local Government and Minister of Ethnic Affairs. In 2004 he was additionally appointed Minister for Building Issues. Carter was the first openly gay man ever appointed as a New Zealand Cabinet minister. He had been a strong advocate of gay equality for some time, and continued this role on entering Parliament.

At the 2005 election, Carter was re-elected to his seat with 59.4% of the vote, a majority of 10,447. Labour lost power in the 2008 election. Carter was re-elected, but his majority was almost halved to 5,298.

On 14 June 2010, 4 days after the release of ministerial credit card records, Carter along with two other MPs Shane Jones MP and Mita Ririnui MP (Lab – Lists) were demoted by Opposition Leader Phil Goff MP (Mount Roskill) for misuse of such credit cards. In the case of Carter, he was accused of purchasing personal items with the card, which was outside the rules for Ministerial expenditure as a minister under the former Clark government over a six-year period. Carter repaid the money in full, a total of $26 ($NZ). His main dispute with Phil Goff was over allegations by Goff that Carter had travelled too much as a Cabinet Minister. All of Carter's travel as a minister was official travel and approved by Cabinet (of which Goff was a member). Carter's demotion included removal from the front bench, and loss of the shadow portfolio of Foreign Affairs. Carter subsequently speculated publicly about whether he would continue as a Member of Parliament.

As a cabinet minister, Carter was entitled to the title of The Honourable and became The Hon. Mr Chris Carter, which is a title granted for the rest of his life.

On 29 July 2010 Carter was suspended from the Labour Party caucus for allegedly being behind an anonymous letter sent around the press gallery claiming there was a leadership challenge against Phil Goff; a charge he later admitted. On 17 August 2010, Speaker Lockwood Smith announced that Carter was officially an independent MP and no longer a Labour MP.

Carter remained an independent MP until his resignation as a Member of Parliament on 30 September 2011. Because Carter's resignation was less than six months prior to the general election on 26 November 2011 election, no by-election was held to fill the vacancy he created.

== United Nations ==
In early September 2011 Carter was appointed as programme manager of the Governance Unit of the United Nations Development Programme (UNDP) in Afghanistan, leading the strengthening of local governance in all 34 Afghan Provinces. He served in that role for 4 years.

On 18 October 2013, Carter was waiting for a colleague to leave his compound in Kabul when a suicide bomber attacked a passing military convoy on the street some 25 metres (82 ft) away; he was separated from the blast by a glass wall. If his Australian colleague had not been late, they could have been the victims of the attack themselves. Carter considered it a "close shave".

In September 2015 Carter was appointed as the Senior UN Advisor for Rakhine State in Myanmar after serving for 4 years in Afghanistan. His Myanmar role, which he filled until 2019, was to lead and coordinate development by UN Agencies operating in Rakhine State, a region of Myanmar marked by serious religious and ethnic conflict between Buddhist and Muslim communities.

== Local politics ==
In 2019, Carter retired from the United Nations after seven years' service and returned to New Zealand to live in Te Atatū. He had rejoined the New Zealand Labour Party in 2018. In the 2019 New Zealand local elections, he was elected a member of Auckland Council's Henderson-Massey Local Board and became chairperson. He was re-elected in 2022 and retained the position of chairperson. He was also elected as a member of the Waitemata District Health Board.

New Zealand Parliament
Preceded by Brian Neeson	Member of Parliament for Te Atatu; 1993–1996 1999–2011	Vacant Seat abolished
Vacant Seat recreated	Member of Parliament for Te Atatu; 1993–1996 1999–2011	Succeeded by Phil Twyford
Political offices
Preceded by Sandra Lee	Minister of Conservation; 2002–2007	Succeeded by Stephanie Chadwick
Preceded by Steve Maharey	Minister of Housing; 2005–2007	Succeeded by Maryan Street
Preceded by Steve Maharey	Minister of Education; 2007–2008	Succeeded by Anne Tolley
