= Phil Twyford =

New Zealand politician (born 1963)

The Honourable Phil Twyford MP
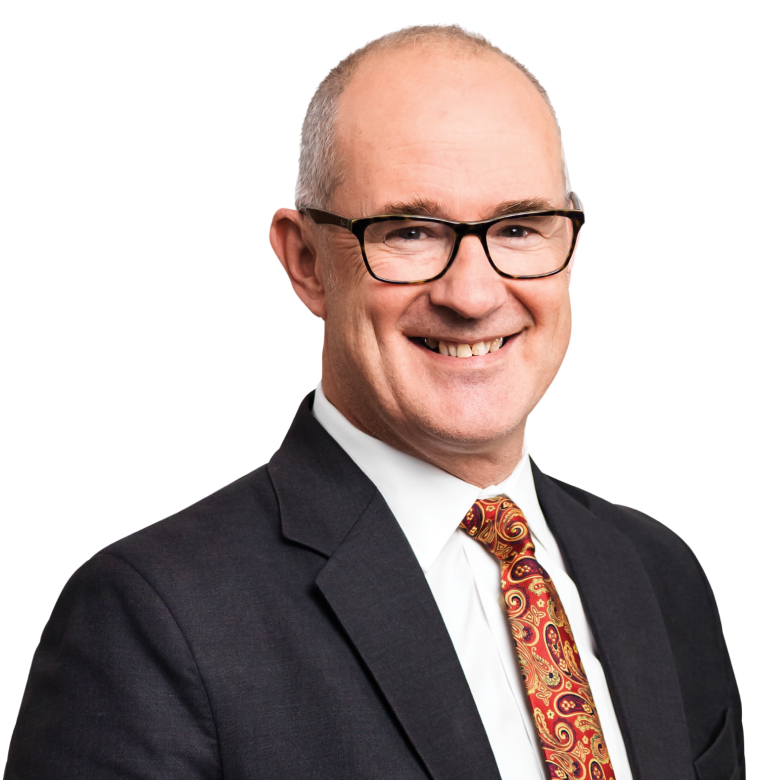
- Twyford in 2023

10th Minister of Disarmament and Arms Control
- In office 6 November 2020 – 1 February 2023
- Prime Minister: Jacinda Ardern; Chris Hipkins
- Preceded by: Winston Peters
- Succeeded by: Nanaia Mahuta

8th Minister for Economic Development
- In office 27 June 2019 – 6 November 2020
- Prime Minister: Jacinda Ardern
- Preceded by: David Parker
- Succeeded by: Stuart Nash

1st Minister for Urban Development
- In office 27 June 2019 – 6 November 2020
- Prime Minister: Jacinda Ardern
- Preceded by: Office Created
- Succeeded by: Office Abolished

27th Minister of Transport
- In office 26 October 2017 – 6 November 2020
- Prime Minister: Jacinda Ardern
- Preceded by: Simon Bridges
- Succeeded by: Michael Wood

27th Minister of Housing and Urban Development
- In office 26 October 2017 – 27 June 2019
- Prime Minister: Jacinda Ardern
- Preceded by: Amy Adams
- Succeeded by: Megan Woods

Member of the New Zealand Parliament for Te Atatū
- Incumbent
- Assumed office 26 November 2011
- Preceded by: Chris Carter
- Majority: 131

Member of the New Zealand Parliament for Labour Party list
- In office 8 November 2008 – 26 November 2011

Personal details
- Born: 4 May 1963 (age 63) Auckland, New Zealand
- Party: Labour
- Education: University of Auckland
- Website: twyford.org.nz

Philip Stoner Twyford (born 4 May 1963) is a politician from New Zealand and a member of the Labour Party. He has been a Member of Parliament since 2008. He is the Labour Party MP for Te Atatū.

== Early years ==
Twyford was born in 1963 in Auckland. His middle name, Stoner, is the maiden name of his mother. He was educated at Westlake Boys High School, and graduated with a Bachelor of Arts from the University of Auckland in 1999. Before politics he worked as the founding director of Oxfam New Zealand, as a journalist and a trade union organiser.

== Member of Parliament ==
Twyford stood for election in the North Shore electorate at the 2005 and 2008 elections. He placed second both times but in 2008 he was elected as a list MP. Prior to entering Parliament, Twyford was a representative on Labour's policy council. After the resignation of Chris Carter, Twyford contested and won the Te Atatū electorate in the 2011 general election and has retained the electorate since.

=== Opposition, 2008–2017 ===
Twyford's first nine years as a Member of Parliament were spent in Opposition. He held a range of urban development and foreign affairs portfolios under successive Labour leaders including development assistance, disarmament and arms control (2008–2011), transport or associate transport (2011–2013, 2014–2017), housing (2013–2017) and building and construction (2009–2011, 2015–2017). In his second term, he was ranked 11th in the shadow Cabinet by leader David Shearer and he continued as a senior member of the Opposition under David Cunliffe and, in Twyford's third term, Andrew Little and Jacinda Ardern.

As an Auckland-based member of Parliament Twyford was appointed to the Auckland Governance Committee which examined the National Government's proposals to consolidate Auckland's eight existing local authorities into one "supercity" governed by the Auckland Council. The Labour Party opposed the reforms. In 2009, Twyford promoted the Local Government (Protection of Auckland Assets) Amendment Bill to address concerns that the council amalgamation was partially to allow the sell-off of public assets. The Bill was defeated at first reading.

A second member's Bill in Twyford's name, the Depleted Uranium (Prohibition) Bill, was selected for debate in September 2010. It proposed a ban on depleted uranium weapons and armour from New Zealand. It was debated in June 2012, and failed to advance on a tied vote.

As housing spokesperson in July 2015, Twyford was criticised for alleged racism when he produced statistics claiming that Chinese foreign buyers were disproportionately buying up real estate in Auckland.

=== Sixth Labour Government, 2017–2023 ===
New Zealand Parliament
Years	Term	Electorate	List	Party
2008–2011	49th	List	26	Labour
2011–2014	50th	Te Atatū	33	Labour
2014–2017	51st	Te Atatū	7	Labour
2017–2020	52nd	Te Atatū	5	Labour
2020–2023	53rd	Te Atatū	4	Labour
2023–2026	54th	Te Atatū	49	Labour
2026–present	55th	Henderson	39	Labour

Twyford was elected as a Cabinet Minister by the Labour Party caucus following Labour's formation of a coalition government with New Zealand First and the Greens, and appointed as the Minister of Housing and Urban Development and the Minister of Transport. In November 2017, Twyford defended his government's proposed Overseas Investment Amendment Act to ban foreign buyers from buying residential property in order to ease the country's housing shortage.

On 24 May 2018, Twyford was dismissed from responsibility for civil aviation (part of the Transport portfolio) after making an unauthorised phone call on a domestic flight as the plane was taking off, a violation of national civil aviation laws. The matter had been raised by Opposition Transport spokesperson Judith Collins. Twyford also offered to resign as Transport Minister but his resignation was turned down by Prime Minister Jacinda Ardern.

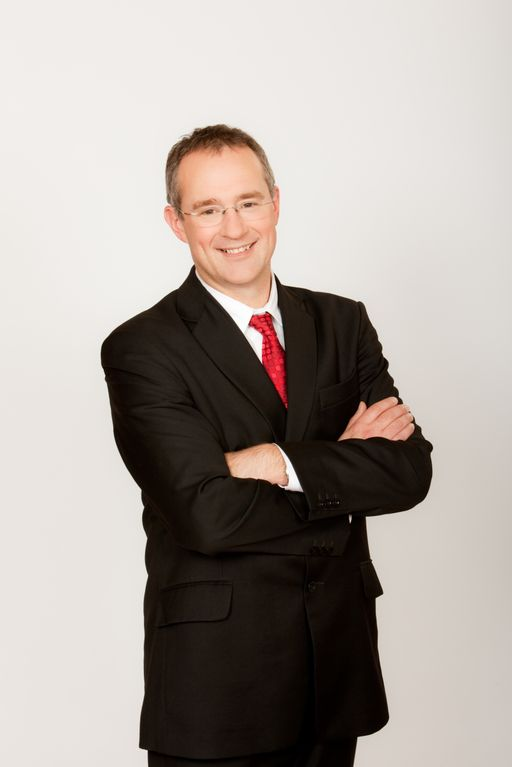
Twyford in 2011

On 23 January 2019, Twyford admitted that the Government would not meet its first target of building 1,000 KiwiBuild homes by 1 July 2019, stating that only 300 homes would be built by then.

On 27 June 2019, in Prime Minister Jacinda Ardern's first major reshuffle of the coalition government, Twyford was replaced as Housing Minister by Megan Woods and succeeded David Parker as Minister of Economic Development. He retained the Urban Development and Transport portfolios.

During the 2020 New Zealand general election, Twyford was the subject of a Facebook attack ad by his National Party opponent Alfred Ngaro alleging that Twyford supported recreational cannabis and unlimited abortion. Though Ngaro subsequently deleted his post, Twyford captured a screenshot and accused his opponent of spreading fake news. In response, National Party leader Judith Collins issued a media statement that Ngaro's comments did not represent the views of the party. Twyford retained his seat in Te Atatū by a final margin of 10,508 votes, defeating Ngaro.

Following the 2020 election, Twyford was dropped from Cabinet but remained a Minister outside of Cabinet as Minister for Disarmament and Arms Control, Minister of State for Trade and Export Growth, Associate Minister of Immigration and Associate Minister for the Environment.

In a cabinet reshuffle by new Prime Minister Chris Hipkins on 31 January 2023, Twyford lost all his remaining ministerial portfolios. On 10 February 2023, Twyford was granted retention of the title "The Honourable" for life, in recognition of his term as a member of the Executive Council.

During the 2023 New Zealand general election, Twyford retained the Te Atatū by a narrow margin of 131 votes over the National Party candidate Angee Nicholas.

=== Sixth National Government, 2023–present ===
Following the formation of the National-led coalition government in late November 2023, Twyford assumed the shadow immigration, disarmament and arms control, and associate foreign affairs portfolios in the Shadow Cabinet of Chris Hipkins.

During the 2026 New Zealand general election, Twyford contested the Henderson for Labour. He was ranked 39th on the Labour Party list. Based on preliminary results, Twyford retained Henderson with a comfortable margin of 6,213 votes on 7 November.

== Political views ==
Twyford identifies as a social democrat. In his maiden speech to Parliament, Twyford expressed support for a New Zealand republic.

=== Israeli-Palestinian conflict ===
In early November 2023, Twyford condemned violence by both Hamas and the Israeli Defense Force during the Gaza war at a Palestine solidarity rally in Auckland. He was booed off the stage by the crowd, later saying "I am sure I also bore the brunt of some people's frustration that politicians are not doing more to stop the war." He has also expressed support for a two-state solution, saying "I want to see the creation of a Palestinian state that will allow both Israel and Palestine to live in peace." Green Party MP Chlöe Swarbrick also spoke at the same rally and expressed support for the Palestinians, chanting "From the river to the sea, Palestine will be free." In response to controversy around Swarbrick's chant, Twyford stated that he "chose not to [use it] because I think it's unhelpful."

New Zealand Parliament
Preceded by Chris Carter	Member of Parliament for Te Atatū; 2011–present	Incumbent
Political offices
Preceded by Simon Bridges	Minister of Transport; 2017–2020	Succeeded by Michael Wood
Preceded by Amy Adams	Minister of Housing and Urban Development; 2017–2019	Succeeded by Megan Woods
Preceded by David Parker	Minister for Economic Development; 2019–2020	Succeeded by Stuart Nash
Preceded by Winston Peters	Minister of Disarmament and Arms Control; 2020–2023	Succeeded by Nanaia Mahuta
