= Waipareira =

Former New Zealand parliamentary electorate

Waipareira was a New Zealand parliamentary electorate that existed for one parliamentary term from 1996 to 1999. Located in West Auckland, it was held by Brian Neeson of the New Zealand National Party, who had narrowly beaten Labour's Chris Carter.

== Population centres ==
The 1996 election was notable for the significant change of electorate boundaries, based on the provisions of the Electoral Act 1993. Because of the introduction of the mixed-member proportional (MMP) electoral system, the number of electorates had to be reduced, leading to significant changes. More than half of the electorates contested in 1996 were newly constituted, and most of the remainder had seen significant boundary changes. In total, 73 electorates were abolished, 29 electorates were newly created (including Waipareira), and 10 electorates were recreated, giving a net loss of 34 electorates.

The electorate includes the following population centres:

- Te Atatū Peninsula
- Massey
- Henderson

== History ==
The electorate was established in the first mixed-member proportional (MMP) election in 1996. The election was won by Brian Neeson, who had represented the Te Atatu (1990–1993) and Waitakere (1993–1996) electorates previously. Neeson narrowly defeated Labour's Chris Carter, who became an MP three years later in 1999.

The race was closely contested with three incumbent MPs (Neeson, Carter and Jack Elder). Neeson had a 141 vote lead after the preliminary count but Carter said he was hopeful of turning around his defeat as there were 4,000 special votes still to be counted. Ultimately Neeson held the electorate by the slightly lower margin of 107. Carter was subsequently employed as an electorate secretary for Labour list MP Jonathan Hunt at his electorate office in Henderson. Hunt's electorate office serviced the constituents of both Waipareira and neighbouring Waitakere.

The electorate was abolished after one parliamentary term for the 1999 election. Neeson transferred back to the Waitakere electorate and represented it for another term.

=== Members of Parliament ===
Key

National Alliance NZ First

Election	Winner
1996 election	Brian Neeson
(Electorate abolished 1999, see Te Atatū)

=== List MPs ===
Members of Parliament elected from party lists in elections where that person also unsuccessfully contested the Waipareira electorate. Unless otherwise stated, all MPs terms began and ended at general elections.

Election	Winner
1996 election	Laila Harré
1996 election	Jack Elder

== Election results ==
=== 1996 election ===
1996 general election: Waipareira
Notes:	Blue background denotes the winner of the electorate vote. Pink background denotes a candidate elected from their party list. Yellow background denotes an electorate win by a list member, or other incumbent. A ✓ or ✗ denotes status of any incumbent, win or lose respectively.						
Party	Candidate	Votes	%	±%	Party votes	%	±%
National	Brian Neeson	12,123	35.56		11,837	34.72	
Labour	Chris Carter	12,016	35.24		10,208	29.94	
NZ First	Jack Elder	4,920	14.43		3,791	11.12	
Alliance	Laila Harré	3,818	11.20		2,932	8.60	
ACT	Chris Fidoe	680	1.99		1,895	5.55	
Natural Law	Judy Boock	146	0.42		155	0.45	
Republican	Akesa Tagaloa-Faleiva	40	0.11				
Christian Coalition					2,029	5.95	
Legalise Cannabis					501	1.46	
United NZ					122	0.35	
McGillicuddy Serious					91	0.27	
Progressive Green					90	0.26	
Ethnic Minority Party					88	0.25	
Animals First					59	0.17	
Superannuitants & Youth					37	0.10	
Green Society					24	0.07	
Advance New Zealand					20	0.05	
Mana Māori					9	0.03	
Libertarianz					7	0.02	
Asia Pacific United					6	0.01	
Conservatives					5	0.01	
Te Tawharau					1	0.01	
Informal votes		345			181		
Total valid votes		34,088			34,088		
National win new seat	Majority	107	0.31				
