= Landcorp =

State-owned New Zealand pastoral farming enterprise

Landcorp Farming Limited
- Company type: State owned enterprise
- Founded: 1987; 39 years ago
- Headquarters: Wellington, New Zealand
- Key people: Dr Warren Parker(Chair); Steven Carden (CEO)
- Products: Pastoral farming and food
- Website: pamunewzealand.com

Landcorp Farming Limited ("Landcorp") is a state-owned enterprise of the New Zealand government. Its brand name is Pāmu, the Māori language word for 'to farm'. Its core business is pastoral farming including dairy, sheep, beef and deer, as well as a foods business marketing milk and meat products globally under the Pāmu brand and as a supplier to other food processors. Pāmu manages 117 properties carrying over 1 million stock units on 365,257 hectares of property under management.

== History ==
Landcorp was incorporated as a State-owned Enterprise on 1 April 1987 to assume the commercial farming and property activities of the former Department of Lands and Survey. It operates under the State Owned Enterprises Act 1986. Landcorp is New Zealand's largest farmer, with over $1.7 billion in total assets. It farms 117 beef, dairy, deer and sheep farms - 84 are owned directly by the company and the others are farmed on behalf of the Crown or private interests. It also owns Focus Genetics, an animal genetics company, and has a 50% investment in Spring Sheep Milk; as well as investments in FarmIQ and Melody Dairies. The company has won a food innovation award for its groundbreaking deer milk innovation and was ranked in the top 10 innovative companies in Australasia in the agriculture category in the 2019 AFR Innovation Awards. Landcorp employs about 700 permanent staff and up to an additional 300 staff during busy periods. It farms about 440000 Sheep, 80000 beef cattle, 74000 dairy cows and 89000 deer. The company has over 9,400 hectares of plantation forestry.

== Climate Change ==
Pāmu states it is dedicated to reducing its climate impact through initiatives aimed at decreasing greenhouse gas emissions and improving climate change resistance. The main strategies include adapting land use in variable conditions, securing climate risk reduction at the forefront of plans, and responding to market demands. Collaborative efforts with research agencies, suppliers, and customers focus on testing innovative technologies to efficiently reach reduction targets, despite the challenges of the agricultural sector such as livestock runoff. Pāmu has committed to reducing net greenhouse gas emissions by at least 30.3% by 2031 from 2021. Detailed climate adaptation plans informed by farm-specific vulnerability research have been implemented.

== Services ==
Landcorp has three main subsidiary companies:

- Landcorp Pastoral Limited holds the investments in Focus Genetics and Spring Sheep
- Landcorp Estates Limited works with joint venture partners to develop land.
- Landcorp Holdings Limited holds selected properties under an agreement with the Crown, with these properties deemed "sensitive" in relation to public policy issues. The properties cannot be sold by Landcorp and continue to be farmed until required by the Crown, principally for Treaty of Waitangi settlements.
