= Department of Survey and Land Information =

Former department of the New Zealand Government

Agency overview
- Formed: 1 April 1987
- Preceding agency: Department of Lands and Survey
- Dissolved: 30 June 1996
- Superseding agency: Land Information New Zealand
- Minister responsible: Minister for Land Information

The Department of Survey and Land Information (DOSLI) is a former department of the New Zealand Government. It was formed in April 1987 as a restructuring of the Department of Lands and Survey.

== History ==
The Department of Lands and Survey was established in 1876 with a wide range of responsibilities, including survey, health and tourist resorts, immigration, Crown lands and roads. Forests and agriculture were added in 1886. Over the years, many of these responsibilities passed to other departments, and by the 1980s Lands and Survey's core responsibilities included survey, land development, mapping, lands and deeds and Crown land.

In the 1987 restructuring, the Department of Survey and Land Information was set up to provide government civil and military survey mapping and land information services. Land development activities were placed with a state-owned enterprise. Conservation management roles were placed with new departments. In July 1996, the Department of Survey and Land Information was itself restructured into Land Information New Zealand, vested with core government land-related regulatory and purchase functions, while the former department's commercial activities were vested with Terralink NZ Ltd, then a state-owned enterprise and now a private company, Terralink International.
