= Te Atatū (electorate) =

- Single-member constituency for the New Zealand House of Representatives
- Location of Te Atatū within Auckland
- Region: Auckland

Current constituency
- Current MP: Phil Twyford
- Party: Labour
- List MP: Simon Court (ACT)

Te Atatū (before 2008 spelled Te Atatu, without a macron) was a parliamentary electorate, returning one Member of Parliament to the New Zealand House of Representatives. The current MP for Te Atatū is Phil Twyford of the Labour Party. The electorate was abolished ahead of the 2026 general election.

== Population centres ==
The 1977 electoral redistribution was the most overtly political since the Representation Commission had been established through an amendment to the Representation Act in 1886, initiated by Muldoon's National Government. As part of the 1976 census, a large number of people failed to fill in an electoral re-registration card, and census staff had not been given the authority to insist on the card being completed. This had little practical effect for people on the general roll, but it transferred Māori to the general roll if the card was not handed in. Together with a northward shift of New Zealand's population, this resulted in five new electorates having to be created in the upper part of the North Island. The electoral redistribution was very disruptive, and 22 electorates were abolished, while 27 electorates were newly created (including Te Atatu) or re-established. These changes came into effect for the 1978 election.

Te Atatū comprises the suburbs of West Auckland on the western side of the Whau River in Auckland. The main parts of the seat are the suburbs of Glendene, Te Atatū Peninsula, Te Atatū South, Lincoln and Massey. Boundary changes in the leadup to the 2008 election have seen the northern boundary edge northwards to include Massey East, with a small southern block transferred to the neighbouring Waitakere seat.

The makeup of Te Atatū shows that while its population is composed roughly inline with the national average: It is roughly the same ages as the nation (with slightly more residents over fifty), and its average income ($22627) is only slightly lower than the rest of New Zealand. Its main point of demographic difference with its country is ethnic – it has more Asian New Zealanders and more Pacific Islanders than the rest of the country.

== History ==
The Te Atatu electorate was created ahead of the 1978 election by pulling apart the seat of Waitemata; its first MP was future cabinet minister Michael Bassett, who had been the MP for Waitemata from 1972 until 1975 before an anti-labour landslide cost him his job. Bassett held the seat until his retirement in 1990, when a toxic battle to succeed Bassett in an already lean year for Labour passed one of their safe seats into the hands of Brian Neeson. Neeson opted not to recontest Te Atatu in 1993; instead shifting to Waitakere. His departure, coupled with a reversal of electoral fortune for the National Party (down from 47.8 to 35.1 percent) led to a victory for incoming Labour MP Chris Carter. In his first three years in Parliament, Carter made news for being the first openly gay member of Parliament.

With the introduction of MMP voting in 1996, Te Atatū was briefly abolished in favour of a new seat called Waipareira, which covered the same area as Te Atatū but also included the wealthy harbourside suburbs to the north of the seat. Te Atatu was re-established for the 1999 election, with the new seat focused more on the working class suburbs at the southern end of Waitakere City. Carter, who had lost Waipareira to Neeson and spent three years out of Parliament, returned as Te Atatu MP and held the position in the 2002, 2005 and 2008 elections. Since 2008 the electorate has been spelled Te Atatū, with a macron.

Carter resigned from the Labour Party in 2010 and from Parliament in 2011. He was succeeded by Labour's Phil Twyford.

The 2025 boundary review saw the reconfiguration of electorates in West Auckland resulting in the disestablishment of Te Atatū, Kelston and New Lynn. Most of the population of Te Atatū has been redistributed to the new electorates of Glendene and Henderson.

=== Members of Parliament ===
Key

Labour National Independent Alliance Green ACT

Election	Winner
1978 election	Michael Bassett
1981 election	Michael Bassett
1984 election	Michael Bassett
1987 election	Michael Bassett
1990 election	Brian Neeson
1993 election	Chris Carter
(Electorate abolished 1996–1999; see Waipareira)
1999 election	Chris Carter
2002 election	Chris Carter
2005 election	Chris Carter
2008 election	Chris Carter
2011 election	Phil Twyford
2014 election	Phil Twyford
2017 election	Phil Twyford
2020 election	Phil Twyford
2023 election	Phil Twyford
(Electorate abolished in 2026; see Henderson)

=== List MPs ===
Members of Parliament elected from party lists in elections since 1999 where that person also unsuccessfully contested the Te Atatū electorate. Unless otherwise stated, all MPs' terms began and ended at general elections.

Election	Winner
1999 election	Laila Harré
2005 election	Tau Henare
2008 election	Tau Henare
2011 election	Tau Henare
2014 election	Alfred Ngaro
2017 election	Alfred Ngaro
2017 election	Golriz Ghahraman
2020 election	Simon Court
2023 election	Simon Court

== Election results ==
=== 2023 ===
2023 general election: Te Atatū
Notes:	Blue background denotes the winner of the electorate vote. Pink background denotes a candidate elected from their party list. Yellow background denotes an electorate win by a list member, or other incumbent. A ✓ or ✗ denotes status of any incumbent, win or lose respectively.						
Party	Candidate	Votes	%	±%	Party votes	%	±%
Labour	✓ Phil Twyford	14,202	38.55	–19.02	12,460	33.32	–24.73
National	Angee Nicholas	14,071	38.20	+9.09	14,045	37.56	+14.84
Green	Zooey Neumann	3,516	9.54	+3.88	4,199	11.23	+4.72
ACT	Simon Court	2,506	6.80	+2.44	2,412	6.45	+1.32
Te Pāti Māori	John Tamihere	1,261	3.42	–	588	1.57	+0.90
Independent	Melanie Philips	482	1.30	–			
NZ First					1,681	4.49	+1.95
Opportunities					681	1.61	+0.55
NewZeal					354	0.94	+0.65
NZ Loyal					282	0.75	–
Legalise Cannabis					151	0.40	+0.06
Freedoms NZ					106	0.28	–
Animal Justice					67	0.17	–
New Conservatives					67	0.17	–1.24
Women's Rights					40	0.10	–
DemocracyNZ					37	0.09	–
New Nation					25	0.06	–
Leighton Baker Party					16	0.04	–
Informal votes		794			255		
Total valid votes		36,832			37,388		
Labour hold	Majority	131	0.35	–28.11			

=== 2020 ===
2020 general election: Te Atatū
Notes:	Blue background denotes the winner of the electorate vote. Pink background denotes a candidate elected from their party list. Yellow background denotes an electorate win by a list member, or other incumbent. A ✓ or ✗ denotes status of any incumbent, win or lose respectively.						
Party	Candidate	Votes	%	±%	Party votes	%	±%
Labour	✓ Phil Twyford	21,253	57.57	+8.67	22,106	58.05	+14.28
National	Alfred Ngaro	10,745	29.11	−10.51	8,653	22.72	−18.51
Green	Scott Hindman	2,088	5.66	+1.54	2,480	6.51	+1.64
ACT	Simon Court	1,610	4.36	+3.66	1,954	5.13	+4.65
Opportunities	Brendon Monk	538	1.46	—	403	1.06	−0.22
New Conservative	Okusitino Paseka	449	1.22	+0.74	537	1.41	+1.07
TEA	Frank Amoah	233	0.63	—	114	0.30	—
NZ First					966	2.54	−3.87
Advance NZ					289	0.67	—
Māori Party					256	0.67	+0.21
Legalise Cannabis					128	0.34	+0.04
ONE					110	0.29	—
Sustainable NZ					31	0.08	—
Vision NZ					22	0.06	—
Outdoors					21	0.06	+0.01
Social Credit					11	0.03	+0.01
Heartland					2	0.01	—
Informal votes		1,115			319		
Total valid votes		36,916			38,083		
Labour hold	Majority	10,508	28.46	+19.18			

=== 2017 ===
2017 general election: Te Atatū
Notes:	Blue background denotes the winner of the electorate vote. Pink background denotes a candidate elected from their party list. Yellow background denotes an electorate win by a list member, or other incumbent. A ✓ or ✗ denotes status of any incumbent, win or lose respectively.						
Party	Candidate	Votes	%	±%	Party votes	%	±%
Labour	✓ Phil Twyford	16,774	48.90	+0.79	15,406	43.77	+8.99
National	Alfred Ngaro	13,590	39.62	+0.14	14,514	41.23	+1.72
NZ First	David Wilson	1,609	4.69	—	2,256	6.41	−1.94
Green	Golriz Ghahraman	1,413	4.12	−0.85	1,715	4.87	−3.18
ACT	Stephen Fletcher	240	0.70	−0.58	170	0.48	−0.87
New Conservative	Marilyn Johnson	164	0.48	−2.48	120	0.34	−3.39
Independent	Tua Schuster	133	0.39	—			
Opportunities					451	1.28	—
Māori Party					161	0.46	+0.03
Legalise Cannabis					104	0.30	−0.07
People's Party					42	0.12	—
United Future					25	0.07	−0.09
Mana					15	0.04	−1.1 (Note: 2017 Mana Party swing is relative to the votes for Internet-Mana in 2014; it shared a party list with the Internet Party in the 2014 election)
Outdoors					15	0.04	—
Internet					14	0.04	−1.1 (Note: 2017 Internet Party swing is relative to the votes for Internet-Mana in 2014; it shared a party list with Mana Party in the 2014 election)
Ban 1080					13	0.04	±0
Democrats					8	0.02	−0.01
Informal votes		381			170		
Total valid votes		34,304			35,199		
Labour hold	Majority	3,184	9.28	+0.65			

=== 2014 ===
2014 general election: Te Atatū
Notes:	Blue background denotes the winner of the electorate vote. Pink background denotes a candidate elected from their party list. Yellow background denotes an electorate win by a list member, or other incumbent. A ✓ or ✗ denotes status of any incumbent, win or lose respectively.						
Party	Candidate	Votes	%	±%	Party votes	%	±%
Labour	✓ Phil Twyford	15,676	48.11	−5.72	11,603	34.81	−4.10
National	Alfred Ngaro	12,863	39.48	+4.03	13,614	40.84	−0.35
Green	Gary Stewart	1,618	4.97	−0.95	2,684	8.05	+0.81
Conservative	Paddy O'Rourke	965	2.96	−0.79	1,243	3.73	+0.97
ACT	Stephen Fletcher	416	1.28	+0.23	450	1.35	+0.47
Legalise Cannabis	Adrian McDermott	328	1.01	+1.01	122	0.37	−0.18
Internet	Chris Yong	300	0.92	+0.92			
NZ First					2,784	8.35	+1.60
Internet Mana					380	1.14	+1.14
Māori Party					142	0.43	−0.20
United Future					52	0.16	−0.23
Ban 1080					12	0.04	+0.04
Independent Coalition					12	0.04	+0.04
Democrats					9	0.03	−0.04
Civilian					5	0.01	+0.01
Focus					0	0.00	0.00
Informal votes		416			223		
Total valid votes		32,582			33,335		
Labour hold	Majority	2,813	8.63	−9.75			

=== 2011 ===
2011 general election: Te Atatū
Notes:	Blue background denotes the winner of the electorate vote. Pink background denotes a candidate elected from their party list. Yellow background denotes an electorate win by a list member, or other incumbent. A ✓ or ✗ denotes status of any incumbent, win or lose respectively.						
Party	Candidate	Votes	%	±%	Party votes	%	±%
Labour	Phil Twyford	15,860	53.83	+0.39	11,999	38.91	-2.59
National	Tau Henare	10,444	35.45	−0.79	12,701	41.19	−0.35
Green	Gary Stewart	1,744	5.92	+2.66	2,231	7.24	+3.23
Conservative	Cynthia Liu	1,106	3.75	+3.75	851	2.76	+2.76
ACT	Dominic Costello	308	1.05	−1.85	271	0.88	−2.28
NZ First					2,081	6.75	+2.56
Māori Party					193	0.63	−0.21
Legalise Cannabis					169	0.55	+0.20
Mana					159	0.52	+0.52
United Future					121	0.39	−0.48
Alliance					24	0.08	−0.01
Democrats					21	0.07	+0.04
Libertarianz					14	0.05	+0.02
Informal votes		1,067			356		
Total valid votes		29,462			30,835		
Labour hold	Majority	5,416	18.38	+1.18			

Electorate (as at 26 November 2011): 43,746

=== 2008 ===
2008 general election: Te Atatū
Notes:	Blue background denotes the winner of the electorate vote. Pink background denotes a candidate elected from their party list. Yellow background denotes an electorate win by a list member, or other incumbent. A ✓ or ✗ denotes status of any incumbent, win or lose respectively.						
Party	Candidate	Votes	%	±%	Party votes	%	±%
Labour	✓ Chris Carter	16,459	53.44		13,171	41.50	
National	Tau Henare	11,161	36.24		13,183	41.54	
Green	Xavier Goldie	1,003	3.26		1,270	4.00	
ACT	Lech Beltowski	891	2.89		1,002	3.16	
Pacific	Fiasili Jackueline Ah Tong	435	1.41		362	1.14	
Kiwi	Jo van Kempen	260	0.84		123	0.39	
United Future	Talei Solomon-Mua	250	0.81		278	0.88	
Progressive	Pavitra Roy	244	0.79		267	0.84	
Alliance	Bob van Ruyssevelt	94	0.31		27	0.09	
NZ First					1,328	4.18	
Māori Party					264	0.83	
Bill and Ben					180	0.57	
Family Party					134	0.42	
Legalise Cannabis					111	0.35	
Workers Party					12	0.04	
Democrats					8	0.03	
Libertarianz					8	0.03	
RAM					6	0.02	
RONZ					4	0.01	
Informal votes		480			174		
Total valid votes		30,797			31,738		
Labour hold	Majority	5,298	17.20				

=== 2005 ===
2005 general election: Te Atatu
Notes:	Blue background denotes the winner of the electorate vote. Pink background denotes a candidate elected from their party list. Yellow background denotes an electorate win by a list member, or other incumbent. A ✓ or ✗ denotes status of any incumbent, win or lose respectively.						
Party	Candidate	Votes	%	±%	Party votes	%	±%
Labour	✓ Chris Carter	18,087	59.37	−3.12	16,209	52.03	
National	Tau Henare	7,640	25.08	+10.63	9,466	30.38	
NZ First	Moetu Davis	1,016	11.14		1,830	5.87	
United Future	Jo van Kemp	897	2.94		956	3.07	
Green	Kath Dewar	849	2.79		1,064	3.42	
Māori Party	Kelvin Martin	250	0.82		219	0.70	
Progressive	Patriva Roy	226	0.74		347	1.11	
Christian Heritage	Betty Jenkins	205	0.67		97	0.31	
Alliance	Bob van Ruyssevelt	104	0.34		24	0.08	
Independent	Adele Hughes	86	0.28				
Family Rights	Stella Te Paeru Brown-Knowles	77	0.25		101	0.32	
Direct Democracy	Gregory Trichon	56	0.18		23	0.07	
ACT					379	1.03	
Destiny					107	0.29	
Legalise Cannabis					52	0.17	
One NZ					6	0.02	
RONZ					6	0.02	
Libertarianz					5	0.02	
99 MP					4	0.01	
Democrats					4	0.01	
Informal votes		370			176		
Total valid votes		30,463			31,154		
Labour hold	Majority	10,447	34.29	−13.75			

=== 2002 ===
2002 general election: Te Atatu
Notes:	Blue background denotes the winner of the electorate vote. Pink background denotes a candidate elected from their party list. Yellow background denotes an electorate win by a list member, or other incumbent. A ✓ or ✗ denotes status of any incumbent, win or lose respectively.						
Party	Candidate	Votes	%	±%	Party votes	%	±%
Labour	✓ Chris Carter	16,821	62.03		14,128	51.39	
National	Tau Henare	3,889	14.34		3,595	13.07	
NZ First	Christine Ritchie	1,811	6.67		2,953	10.74	
United Future	Anne Drake	1,540	5.67		2,100	7.63	
ACT	Ted Erskine-Legget	875	3.22		1,381	5.02	
Alliance	Bob van Ruyssevelt	654	2.41		618	2.24	
Christian Heritage	Matthew Flannagan	584	2.15		473	1.72	
Progressive	Pasene Taulialo-O-Lilomaiava	365	1.34		490	1.78	
Independent	Helen Wiseman-Dare	197	0.72				
Green					1,248	4.54	
ORNZ					174	0.63	
Legalise Cannabis					132	0.48	
One NZ					16	0.05	
Mana Māori					8	0.02	
NMP					3	0.01	
Informal votes		378			169		
Total valid votes		27,114			27,488		
Labour hold	Majority	12,932	47.69				

=== 1999 ===
Refer to Candidates in the New Zealand general election 1999 by electorate#Te Atatu for a list of candidates.

=== 1993 ===
1993 general election: Te Atatu
Party	Candidate	Votes	%	±%
Labour	Chris Carter	6,889	36.78	
Alliance	Laila Harré	5,501	29.37	
National	Tracey Adams	4,724	25.22	
NZ First	Peter Brown	1,121	5.98	
Christian Heritage	Alan Broadbent	342	1.82	
McGillicuddy Serious	Aaron Lloyd Franklin	89	0.47	
Workers Rights	Bill Bradford	36	0.19	
Natural Law	Judith Ann Boock	27	0.14	
Majority		1,388	7.41	
Turnout		18,729	96.90	+20.33
Registered electors		22,588		

=== 1990 ===
1990 general election: Te Atatu
Party	Candidate	Votes	%	±%
National	Brian Neeson	8,662	44.75	+3.48
Labour	Dan McCaffrey	7,292	37.67	
Green	Warwick Pudney	1,627	8.40	
NewLabour	Sue Pockett	1,277	6.59	
Democrats	Marilyn Jackson	323	1.66	−3.13
McGillicuddy Serious	Kit Boyes	129	0.66	
Majority		1,370	7.07	
Turnout		19,355	76.57	−7.30
Registered electors		25,277		

=== 1987 ===
1987 general election: Te Atatu
Party	Candidate	Votes	%	±%
Labour	Michael Bassett	10,044	53.18	−1.38
National	Brian Neeson	7,795	41.27	
Democrats	Marilyn Jackson	906	4.79	−0.72
NZ Party	G M Oxton	140	0.74	
Majority		2,249	11.90	−13.34
Turnout		18,885	83.87	−6.17
Registered electors		22,516		

=== 1984 ===
1984 general election: Te Atatu
Party	Candidate	Votes	%	±%
Labour	Michael Bassett	10,786	54.56	+6.17
National	Frank Diment	5,795	29.31	
NZ Party	Gray Phillips	1,972	9.97	
Social Credit	Marilyn Jackson	1,090	5.51	
Independent	Gordon Raymond Prout	126	0.63	
Majority		4,991	25.24	+6.57
Turnout		19,769	90.04	+3.85
Registered electors		21,954		

=== 1981 ===
1981 general election: Te Atatu
Party	Candidate	Votes	%	±%
Labour	Michael Bassett	8,577	48.09	−0.90
National	Stella Noble	5,247	29.42	
Social Credit	Rodney Wilson	4,009	22.48	
Majority		3,330	18.67	+2.69
Turnout		17,833	86.19	+16.18
Registered electors		20,688		

=== 1978 ===
1978 general election: Te Atatu
Party	Candidate	Votes	%	±%
Labour	Michael Bassett	8,640	48.99	
National	W R Cross	5,821	33.01	
Social Credit	John Geoffrey Rawson	2,923	16.57	
Values	D C Bartle	250	1.41	
Majority		2,819	15.98	
Turnout		17,634	70.01	
Registered electors		25,186		

== Bibliography ==
- McRobie, Alan (1989). Electoral Atlas of New Zealand. Wellington: GP Books. ISBN 0-477-01384-8.
- Norton, Clifford (1988). New Zealand Parliamentary Election Results 1946-1987: Occasional Publications No 1, Department of Political Science. Wellington: Victoria University of Wellington. ISBN 0-475-11200-8.
- Wilson, Jim (1985) [First ed. published 1913]. New Zealand Parliamentary Record, 1840–1984 (4th ed.). Wellington: V.R. Ward, Govt. Printer. OCLC 154283103.
