= Minister for Economic Growth =

New Zealand minister of the Crown

- Coat of arms of New Zealand

- Flag of New Zealand

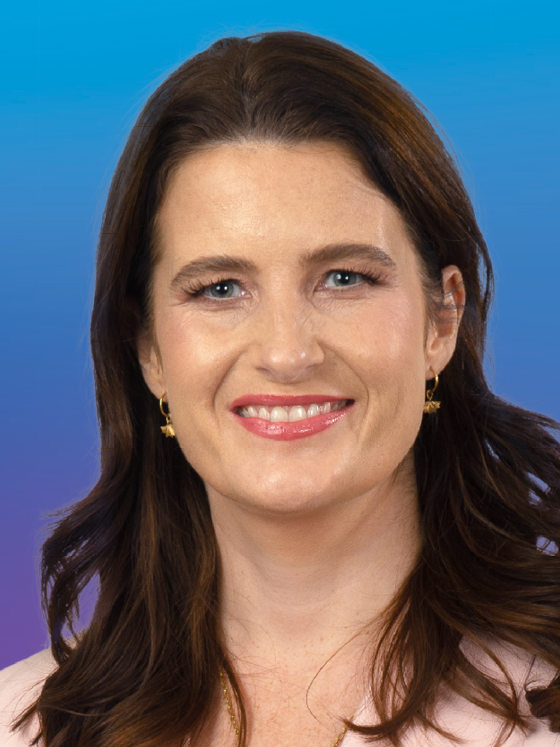
- Incumbent; Nicola Willis since 24 January 2025
- Ministry of Business, Innovation and Employment
- Style: The Honourable
- Member of: Cabinet of New Zealand; Executive Council
- Reports to: Prime Minister of New Zealand
- Appointer: Governor-General of New Zealand
- Term length: At His Majesty's pleasure
- Formation: 10 December 1999
- First holder: Jim Anderton
- Salary: $288,900
- Website: www.beehive.govt.nz

The minister for economic growth, previously the minister for economic development, is a minister in the New Zealand Government with the responsibility of promoting development of New Zealand's economy, and is in charge of the Ministry of Business, Innovation and Employment. The position was established in 1999.

The present minister is Nicola Willis.

== History ==
At its establishment, the minister for economic development was the lead minister for the Ministry of Economic Development, which was established out of the former Ministry of Commerce as part of the Labour-Alliance coalition agreement.

From 1 July 2012, the minister assumed responsibility for the new Ministry of Business, Innovation and Employment following the merger of the Ministry of Economic Development with several other government agencies.

The position was briefly renamed minister for economic and regional development after being merged with the standalone Regional Economic Development in 2020. In early 2023 the portfolio was split back into two, and its name reverted back to minister for economic development.

Similar ministerial roles under previous governments include the minister for enterprise and commerce (1998–1999), the minister of trade and industry (1972–1988) and the minister of industries and commerce (1894–1972).

== List of ministers ==
Key

Alliance Progressive Labour National

No.	Name	Portrait	Term of office		Prime Minister
As Minister for Economic Development
1	Jim Anderton		10 December 1999	19 October 2005	Clark
2	Trevor Mallard		19 October 2005	2 November 2007	Clark
3	Pete Hodgson		2 November 2007	19 November 2008	Clark
4	Gerry Brownlee		19 November 2008	13 December 2011^{[A]}	Key
-	David Carter (Acting)^{[A]}		24 February 2011	13 December 2011	Key
5	Steven Joyce		14 December 2011	20 December 2016	Key
6	Simon Bridges		20 December 2016	26 October 2017	English
7	David Parker		26 October 2017	27 June 2019	Ardern
8	Phil Twyford		27 June 2019	6 November 2020	Ardern
9	Stuart Nash		6 November 2020	28 March 2023^{[B]}	Ardern
9	Stuart Nash		6 November 2020	28 March 2023^{[B]}	Hipkins
–	Megan Woods		28 March 2023	12 April 2023	Hipkins
10	Barbara Edmonds		12 April 2023	27 November 2023	Hipkins
11	Melissa Lee		27 November 2023	24 January 2025	Luxon
As Minister for Economic Growth
12	Nicola Willis		24 January 2025	Incumbent	Luxon

A.Carter was appointed as Acting Minister of Economic Development following the 2011 Christchurch earthquake and Brownlee's increased workload as Minister for Christchurch Earthquake Recovery (to which he had been appointed in September 2010 after the 2010 Christchurch earthquake). However, Brownlee retained his warrant as Minister of Economic Development until after the 2011 general election.
B.Stylised as Minister for Economic and Regional Development from 6 November 2020 to 1 February 2023.
