= Overtime rate =

Extra hours worked by an employee

Overtime rate is a calculation of hours worked by a worker that exceed those hours defined for a standard workweek. This rate can have different meanings in different countries and jurisdictions, depending on how that jurisdiction's labor law defines overtime. In many jurisdictions, additional pay is mandated for certain classes of workers when this set number of hours is exceeded. In others, there is no concept of a standard workweek or analogous time period, and no additional pay for exceeding a set number of hours within that week.

The overtime rate calculates the ratio between employee overtime with the regular hours in a specific time period. Even if the work is planned or scheduled, it can still be considered overtime if it exceeds what is considered the standard workweek in that jurisdiction.

A high overtime rate is a good indicator of a temporary or permanent high workload, and can be a contentious issue in labor-management relations. It could result in a higher illness rate, lower safety rate, higher labor costs, and lower productivity.

== United States ==
In the United States a standard workweek is considered to be 40 hours. Most waged employees or so-called non-exempt workers under U.S. federal labor and tax law must be paid at a wage rate of 150% of their regular hourly rate for hours that exceed 40 in a week. The start of the pay week can be defined by the employer, and need not be a standard calendar week start (e.g., Sunday midnight). Many employees, especially shift workers in the U.S., have some amount of overtime built into their schedules so that 24/7 coverage can be obtained.

== Formula ==
$\textstyle{\mbox{Overtime Rate } = \frac{\sum{\mbox{Overtime Hours}}}{\sum{\mbox{Regular Hours (defined)}}}} \times 100 \%$
