= Brian Neeson =

New Zealand politician (born 1945)

Brian Kevin Neeson (born 30 September 1945) is a New Zealand politician. He was an MP from 1990 to 2002, representing the National Party, and a member of the Waitematā District Health Board from 2004 to 2010.

== Early life ==
Neeson was born in Durban, South Africa, and moved to New Zealand when he was six years old. He worked in a number of jobs, having owned a restaurant and retail meat business and worked as a real estate consultant and property developer. He later managed a private investment company.

== Political career ==
New Zealand Parliament
Years	Term	Electorate	List	Party
1990–1993	43rd	Te Atatu		National
1993–1996	44th	Waitakere		National
1996–1999	45th	Waipareira	35	National
1999–2002	46th	Waitakere	34	National

Neeson represented a number of West Auckland electorates in his career, with frequent boundary changes meaning that he never ran in any electorate as an incumbent. He was first elected to Parliament in the 1990 election as MP for the Te Atatu seat, and in the 1993 election, he successfully contested the Waitakere seat. In the 1996 election, he successfully contested the Waipareira seat, and in the 1999 election, he contested the Waitakere seat once again. From age 38, he had lived in a house in West Harbour and he always stood in the electorate that his house was located in.

In the 2002 election, he sought the National Party nomination for the new seat of Helensville, which had absorbed most of the Waitakere electorate. However, he was controversially defeated for selection by John Key, a new candidate. Neeson considered his non-selection to be a betrayal, believing that National Party president Michelle Boag had deliberately engineered his defeat in order to further her "rejuvenation" of the party. Neeson quit the National Party and stood as an independent, but placed third.

== After parliament ==
In December 2009 Neeson was appointed to the Human Rights Review Tribunal. The appointment was criticised by the gay community and by Labour MP Grant Robertson due to Neeson's record of voting against gay rights while an MP.

In 2010 Neeson was elected to the Upper Harbour Local Board of the new Auckland Council, as well as the Waitakere Licensing Trust. He also ran for the Auckland Council, placing 10th in the Albany ward with 4,911 votes.

At the 2016 Auckland elections, Neeson was elected to the Upper Harbour Local Board and the Waitematā District Health Board.
