= Department of Lands and Survey =

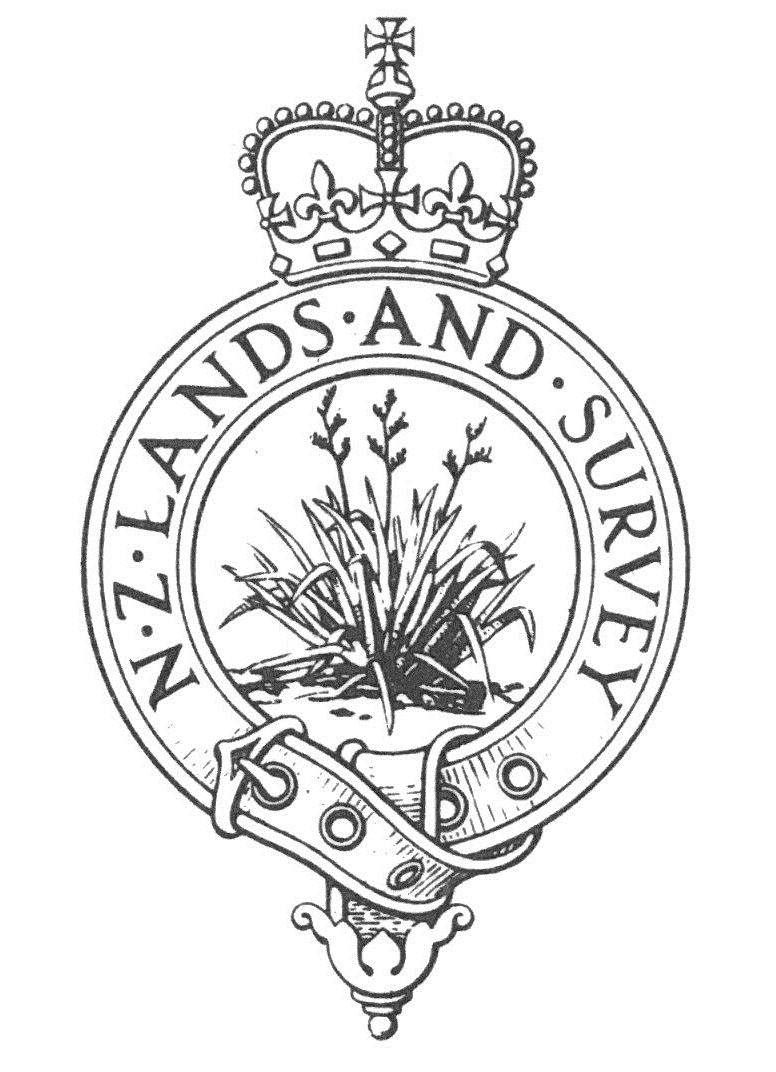

Agency overview
- Formed: 1 May 1876
- Preceding agencies: Department of the Surveyor-General; Crown Lands Department
- Dissolved: 1 April 1987
- Superseding agencies: Department of Conservation; Department of Survey and Land Information; Landcorp
- Minister responsible: Minister of Lands

The Department of Lands and Survey was a government department in New Zealand that managed the administration of Crown land and its survey and mapping requirements.

== History ==
=== Establishment ===
The department was established in 1876 with the appointment of John Turnbull Thomson as Surveyor-General. A major expansion took place in 1891 by combining the Department of the Surveyor-General and the Crown Lands Department into one agency. Its existence as an independent agency was consolidated with the passing of the Land Act 1892. Although the two agencies had merged, operationally they functioned separately until 1913. The minister responsible, from 1891, was the Minister of Lands. The head of the department initially held the titles of both preceding agencies as the Surveyor-General and Under-Secretary for Lands until 1906. The former post was subsumed by the latter before being renamed Director-General of Lands in 1949.

=== Functions and responsibilities ===
The Department of Lands and Survey main duties were administrating and managing Crown land (including walkways, national parks and reserves), surveying and mapping, land development and area planning. The department also administered a number of Statutory Boards which dealt the administration and management of land.

=== Disestablishment ===
In April 1987 the department was disestablished as part of significant restructuring of government administration. Its functions were split among three new government departments; the Department of Conservation, the Department of Survey and Land Information and Landcorp (a public company established under the State Owned Enterprises Act). A similar merger between the department and Forest Service had been intended in 1983 but was called off, citing too high a cost to combine the departments.
