= Terralink International =

New Zealand geographic information systems provider

- Company type: Private
- Industry: Geospatial Data
- Founded: 1 July 1996
- Headquarters: Wellington, New Zealand
- Key people: Mike Donald, Managing Director
- Products: Land and Property Information
- Services: Spatial Data Services, Geospatial Solutions
- Number of employees: 75
- Parent: Cotality
- Website: http://terralink.co.nz/ archived from the original on 16 May 2014

Terralink International was a New Zealand owned and operated provider of geographic information systems (GIS) and mapping solutions. In 2014 it was bought by Property IQ — 60% owned by the US-based CoreLogic corporation — and the two were merged and renamed CoreLogic NZ Limited.

== Overview ==
Terralink International specialised in delivering mapping, property information and imagery, as well as geographical and spatial information. Terralink also produced and updated many of New Zealand's official topographic, city and scientific maps. Other geospatial related services and solutions provided by Terralink International included:

- GIS/Spatial data maintenance, production and analysis
- Photogrammetry
- Cartography
- Imagery acquisition, provision and hosting
- Data replication and integration
- GIS infrastructure development
- Addressing Services/Matching
- Geocoding
- Online hosting
- Web and software development
- Customer Support Services
- Data analytics

== History ==
A former Government-owned enterprise with a history extending back over 100 years, Terralink International maintained and managed New Zealand’s largest and most comprehensive land and property information database. Terralink NZ Limited was privatised in May 2001 when it was purchased by a consortium of investors to form Terralink International Limited. This occurred following a receivership in January 2001, after which its ownership was 80% Animation Research Holdings Ltd, a New Zealand company specialising in 3D animation, and 20% Spatial Holdings Ltd.

Terralink International was 100% New Zealand owned and operated. In 2014 it was bought by and merged with Property IQ, and has now become CoreLogic NZ Limited; 60% owned by the US-based CoreLogic corporation.

== Location ==
Terralink International's head office and core production facility was situated in Wellington with a satellite office in Auckland. Around 75 staff were employed by Terralink International.
