= Stuart Nash =

New Zealand politician (born 1967)

The Honourable Stuart Nash
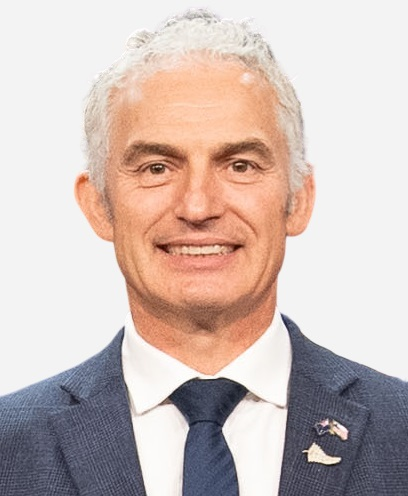
- Nash in 2023

9th Minister for Economic Development
- In office 1 February 2023 – 28 March 2023
- Prime Minister: Chris Hipkins
- Preceded by: himself (as Minister for Economic and Regional Development)
- Succeeded by: Megan Woods (Acting)

32nd Minister of Forestry
- In office 6 November 2020 – 28 March 2023
- Prime Minister: Jacinda Ardern; Chris Hipkins
- Preceded by: Shane Jones
- Succeeded by: Megan Woods (Acting)

11th Minister for Oceans and Fisheries
- In office 1 February 2023 – 28 March 2023
- Prime Minister: Chris Hipkins
- Preceded by: David Parker
- Succeeded by: David Parker (Acting)

39th Minister of Police
- In office 1 February 2023 – 15 March 2023
- Prime Minister: Chris Hipkins
- Preceded by: Chris Hipkins
- Succeeded by: Megan Woods (Acting)
- In office 26 October 2017 – 6 November 2020
- Prime Minister: Jacinda Ardern
- Preceded by: Paula Bennett
- Succeeded by: Poto Williams

9th Minister for Economic and Regional Development
- In office 6 November 2020 – 1 February 2023
- Prime Minister: Jacinda Ardern; Chris Hipkins
- Preceded by: Phil Twyford (as Minister for Economic Development); Shane Jones (as Minister for Regional Economic Development)
- Succeeded by: himself (as Minister for Economic Development); Kiri Allan (as Minister for Regional Development)

37th Minister of Tourism
- In office 6 November 2020 – 1 February 2023
- Prime Minister: Jacinda Ardern; Chris Hipkins
- Preceded by: Kelvin Davis
- Succeeded by: Peeni Henare

11th Minister of Fisheries
- In office 26 October 2017 – 6 November 2020
- Prime Minister: Jacinda Ardern
- Preceded by: Nathan Guy (as Minister for Primary Industries)
- Succeeded by: David Parker

30th Minister of Revenue
- In office 26 October 2017 – 6 November 2020
- Prime Minister: Jacinda Ardern
- Preceded by: Judith Collins
- Succeeded by: David Parker

Member of the New Zealand Parliament for Napier
- In office 20 September 2014 – 14 October 2023
- Preceded by: Chris Tremain
- Succeeded by: Katie Nimon

Member of the New Zealand Parliament for the Labour Party list
- In office 8 November 2008 – 26 November 2011

Personal details
- Born: August 1967 (age 59) Napier, New Zealand
- Party: Labour Party (until 2025); New Zealand First (2026–present)
- Spouse: Sarah Nash
- Children: 4
- Parent(s): Hal Nash; Jenny Nash
- Relatives: Sir Walter Nash (great-grandfather)
- Education: University of Canterbury
- Profession: International Business
- Website: Official website archived

Stuart Alexander Nash (born August 1967) is a former New Zealand politician from 2008 to 2026. He was a member of the House of Representatives for the Labour Party from 2008 to 2011, and was re-elected in the 2014 election as a representative for the Napier electorate. In October 2017 when Jacinda Ardern became Prime Minister of New Zealand, Nash entered the Labour Cabinet, with portfolios of Police, Revenue, Small Business and Fisheries. In the second Ardern administration, Nash was handed the Economic Development, Tourism, Forestry, and Small Business portfolios. In early April 2023, Nash confirmed that he would not be contesting the 2023 election.

Nash is the adoptive great-grandson of Sir Walter Nash, 27th Prime Minister of New Zealand in the Second Labour Government from 1957 to 1960.

== Early, professional, and personal life ==
Stuart Alexander Nash was born in August 1967 to a single mother and adopted by Jenny and Hal Nash, making him a great-grandson of Sir Walter Nash. In an oral interview in 2018, Nash recounted growing up in Napier, attending Napier Boys' High School, then gaining Masters degrees in law, forestry science, and management from the University of Canterbury, before becoming Director of Strategic Development at the Auckland University of Technology.

He is married to health and fitness coach Sarah Nash. The couple has two children, and Stuart has two adult children from a previous marriage.

In March 2024, the couple purchased the former Napier courthouse with the intention of renovating it as their family home.

== Political career ==
New Zealand Parliament
Years	Term	Electorate	List	Party
2008–2011	49th	List	36	Labour
2014–2017	51st	Napier	none	Labour
2017–2020	52nd	Napier	11	Labour
2020–2023	53rd	Napier	12	Labour

=== Early political career ===
In 2005, Nash was a Labour candidate for the safe National seat of Epsom, placing third behind Rodney Hide and Richard Worth; having been directed by then-Prime Minister Helen Clark to ask Labour supporters to vote for the National candidate, Richard Worth, in a strategy designed to defeat ACT MP Rodney Hide. The tactic failed, with Hide winning; though at 9,915 Labour received the highest number of party votes in this electorate since the introduction of the MMP parliamentary system in 1996. Placed at number 60 on the party list, Nash failed to get elected.

=== Election to Parliament on the list ===
In 2007, Nash contested the Labour Party selection for Napier seat in 2008 election, but lost to Russell Fairbrother, a list MP and a former Napier electorate MP. However, Nash was ranked at number 36 on the party list and was subsequently elected to parliament.

After becoming a list MP Nash was appointed Labour's spokesperson for Revenue, and associate spokesperson for Trade and Forestry by Labour leader Phil Goff. On 15 June 2010, Opposition Leader Phil Goff appointed Nash to be portfolio spokesperson for Forestry, a position formerly held by Mita Ririnui. In February 2011 Phil Goff announced his new caucus line up and Nash was ranked 27th, retaining all his portfolio responsibilities.

=== 2011–2014 ===
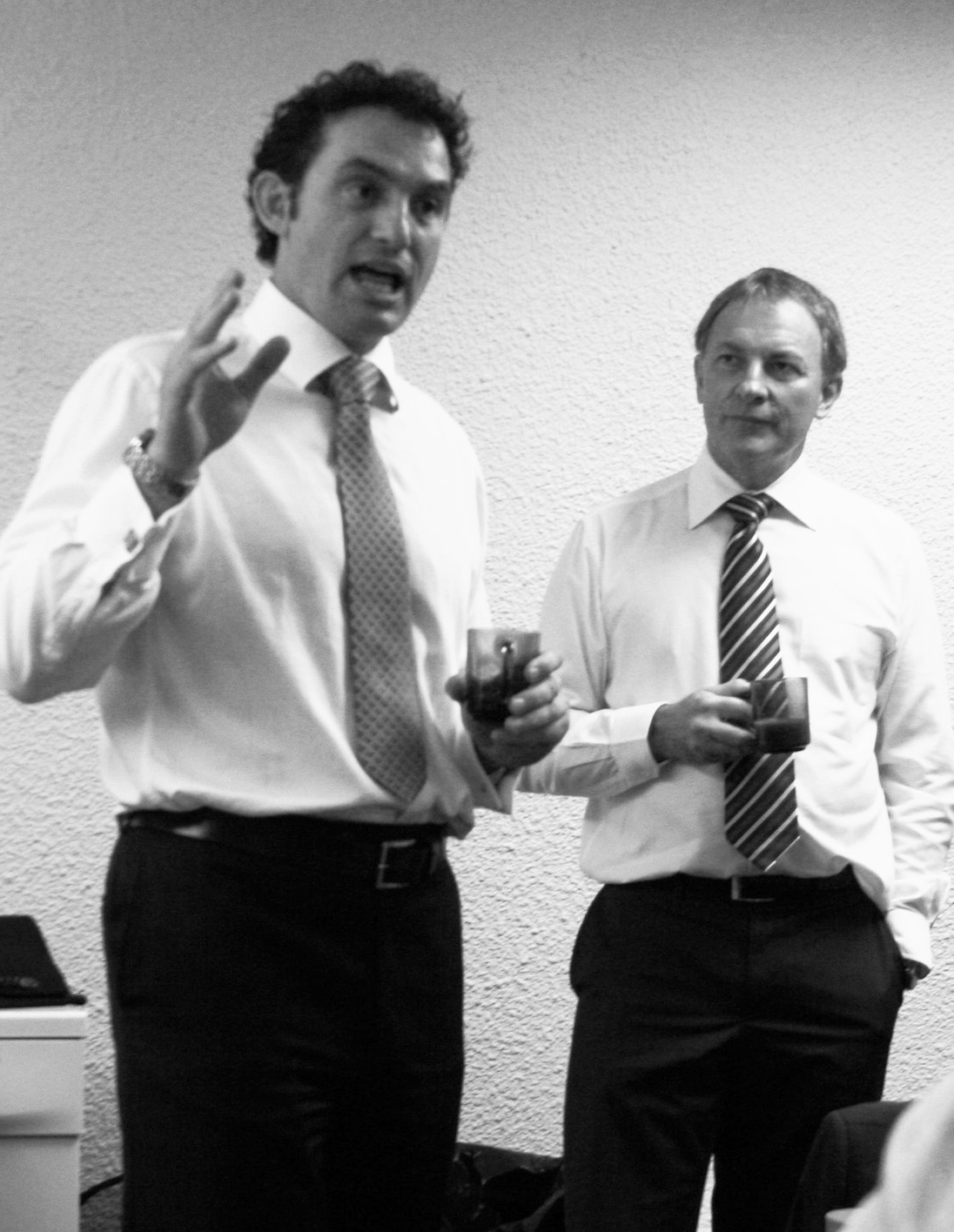
Nash and Phil Goff addressing community groups in 2011

In the 2011 general election, Nash contested Napier electorate seat held by National Cabinet Minister Chris Tremain. Nash reduced Tremain's 2008 majority of 9,018 votes by 5,300 votes (the highest reduction achieved against a sitting National electorate MP) but still came second. As well, Nash was ranked 27 on the Labour list, higher than in 2008 but not high enough on the Labour list to return to Parliament as a List MP.

After leaving Parliament, Nash signed on as the chief-of-staff for newly appointed party leader David Shearer. However, Nash resigned after just four months into the job and returned to his home town of Napier, citing the birth of his new child and focusing on winning back the electorate there.

=== 2014–current: Return to Parliament ===
In February 2014, Nash was selected as Labour's candidate for Napier to contest the 2014 general election. National's Tremain had retired and was succeeded by Wayne Walford, and Nash had a majority of 3,850 votes over Walford. The electorate was also contested by Garth McVicar for the Conservative Party, and McVicar's 7,603 votes cut into traditional National Party votes.

Nash retained the Napier electorate in 2017, increasing his majority and becoming only the second Labour MP after Damien O'Connor to win and hold a seat off the National party this century. Nash was elected as a Cabinet Minister by the Labour Party caucus following Labour's formation of a coalition government with New Zealand First and the Greens. On 26 October, he was appointed as Minister of Police, Revenue, Small Business and Fisheries.

During the 2020 general election, Nash retained his seat in Napier by a final margin of 5,856. On 2 November 2020, Jacinda Ardern announced that Nash would be dropping the Police, Revenue and Fisheries portfolios, and would pick up the Economic and Regional Development, Forestry, and Tourism portfolios, while retaining Small Business.

In mid November 2021, Nash claimed that farming advocacy group Groundswell NZ's website promoted racism and vaccine hesitancy in response to a question by ACT Member of Parliament Mark Cameron. When Cameron reiterated his question, Nash told Cameron to avoid posing with someone holding an anti-vaccination sign at a Groundswell protest. In response to Nash's remarks, Groundswell co-founder Bryce McKenzie emphasised the group's efforts to combat racism and vaccine hesitancy among its ranks. McKenzie added that the group had accepted the resignation of Groundswell member and Tatua Dairy board of directors member Ross Townshend for posting an offensive image depicting Foreign Minister Nanaia Mahuta as a gang member.

==== 2023 ministerial indiscretions and resignation ====
In mid–March 2023, Nash resigned as Minister of Police following revelations he asked the Police Commissioner Andrew Coster to appeal a decision Nash felt was too light, a breach of the expectation that the Government remains neutral in regards to operational police matters. On 16 March, Nash faced further calls from the opposition National and ACT parties to resign from his remaining portfolios after revelations that the Attorney-General David Parker had reprimanded Nash for making remarks during a 2020 Newstalk ZB interview calling for murder suspect Eli Epiha to be imprisoned for his actions during the murder of Matthew Hunt. At the time, Epiha was facing trial and had not yet been convicted for murdering Hunt. Nash subsequently admitted to a third incident of misconduct where he contacted the Ministry of Business, Innovation and Employment (MBIE) to advocate for a migrant health professional in Napier in September 2022. In response, Hipkins demoted Nash to the bottom of the Cabinet rankings as a "final warning" but declined to strip him of his remaining cabinet portfolios.

On 28 March it was revealed that in 2020 Nash emailed two of his donors, who were commercial property owners, about a commercial rent relief policy Cabinet was discussing. The Cabinet Manual, part of New Zealand's unwritten constitution, sets out that "discussion at Cabinet and Cabinet committee meetings is informal and confidential", and that any proposals "likely to be considered at forthcoming meetings, outside Cabinet-approved consultation procedures" are not allowed to be disclosed. In the email, Nash expressed his view that "I am as annoyed (and surprised) about the final outcome of the 'commercial rent relief package' as you are". Prime Minister Chris Hipkins advised the Governor General to strip Nash of his ministerial portfolios the same day.

On 3 April, Nash announced that he would not be contesting the 2023 New Zealand general election. In a statement published on Facebook, he stated while his work as a minister in the Ardern Cabinet "has been rewarding, and both intellectually and professionally stimulating, it has also been incredibly taxing on relationships with family and friends." Prior to Nash's announcement, Hipkins had asked the Cabinet Secretary to conduct a review into communications between Nash and his donors in order to identify further breaches of Cabinet confidentiality and both perceived or real conflicts of interest. Despite his dismissal, on 26 April 2023 Nash was granted the use of the prefix "The Honourable" for life, in recognition of his term as a Member of the Executive Council.

On 16 June, a Cabinet Office report cleared Nash of confidentiality breaches but identified a conflict of interest in the government appointment of a donor and high school friend, Phil McCaw, who had donated the sum of NZ$6,500 to Nash's 2020 election campaign. While Nash had managed McCaw's conflict of interest by getting another minister to appoint McCaw, he failed in the continual management of the problem. Newshub reported that the Cabinet office had examined five years worth of Nash's communications and that a senior minister had disputed the inclusion of McCaw's appointment within the probe. On 19 June, the Chief Ombudsman Peter Boshier found that Nash had breached Official Information Act by improperly withholding emails in which he discussed confidential Cabinet briefings with two donors, Troy Bowker and Greg Loveridge, during the COVID-19 pandemic in June 2020.

== Post-politics ==
In late February 2024, Nash criticised his former Labour Party colleagues' legislation targeting gang assets, claiming that it did not go far enough. In March 2023, the Labour government had passed the Criminal Proceeds (Recovery) Act 2023, which allowed police to seize gang leaders' properties, cars, bikes and jewelry valued at NZ$30,000 or above in compliance with the New Zealand Bill of Rights. Nash argued that there should be no limit on the amount of gang assets seized. Nash claimed that former Justice Minister Kiri Allan had blocked efforts to introduce tougher anti-gang legislation on the grounds that it targeted Māori people. Nash pressed for the National-led coalition government to do away with the $30,000 limit on the seizure of gang assets. In response, Labour MP Willie Jackson accused Nash of grandstanding, "lacking class" and pitching for contracts around Wellington.

In April 2025, amid rumours that he was considering contesting the 2026 general election as a New Zealand First candidate, Nash confirmed that he was no longer a member of the Labour Party and did not deny the rumours. He spoke at a New Zealand First party conference in September, criticising Labour for being "woke".

In September 2025, Nash made national headlines in New Zealand for using sexist slurs when asked for a definition of a woman, stating that a woman is "a person with a pussy and a pair of tits" in an interview on internet radio station The Platform with host Sean Plunket. He later contacted the show and asked for the comment to be removed. On 11 September, Nash resigned from his job at recruitment company Robert Walters after his employer launched a review into his radio remarks. He also resigned from the board of the New Zealand Taxpayers' Union.

In May 2026, Nash announced he would be contesting the Napier electorate for New Zealand First in the 2026 election. In July 2026, further claims of sexist language appeared in the press, directed at National MP Katie Nimon. This was followed by an announcement from Prime Minister Christopher Luxon that Nash would not be in any cabinet led by Luxon as a minister. On 22 July, his resignation as a candidate in the 2026 election was accepted by New Zealand First. After initially refusing to apologise, Nash contacted Nimon on 23 July and apologised for his remarks.

New Zealand Parliament
Preceded by Chris Tremain	Member of Parliament for Napier; 2014–2023	Succeeded by Katie Nimon
Political offices
Preceded by Judith Collins	Minister of Revenue; 2017–2020	Succeeded by David Parker
Preceded by Nathan Guy as Minister for Primary Industries	Minister of Fisheries; 2017–2020	Succeeded by David Parker
Preceded by Paula Bennett	Minister of Police; 2017–2020 2023	Succeeded by Poto Williams
Preceded by Chris Hipkins	Minister of Police; 2017–2020 2023	Succeeded by Ginny Andersen
Preceded by Phil Twyford	Minister for Economic Development; 2020–2023	Succeeded by Barbara Edmonds
Preceded by Shane Jones	Minister of Forestry; 2020–2023	Succeeded by Peeni Henare
Preceded by Kelvin Davis	Minister of Tourism; 2020–2023	Succeeded by Peeni Henare
Preceded by David Parker	Minister for Oceans and Fisheries; 2023	Succeeded by Rachel Brooking
