= Overseas Investment Amendment Act 2018 =

Act of Parliament in New Zealand

New Zealand Parliament
- Long title: An Act to— amend the Overseas Investment Act 2005 to ensure that investments made by overseas persons in New Zealand will have genuine benefits for the country.
- Passed: 15 August 2018
- Royal assent: 22 August 2018
- Introduced by: David Parker
- Status: Current legislation

The Overseas Investment Amendment Act 2018 is a New Zealand bill that amends the Overseas Investment Act 2005 to ban most non-resident foreigners from buying existing houses, by classifying them as sensitive land and introducing a residency test. Australian citizens are exempt from this rule as they are considered New Zealand residents per the Trans-Tasman Travel Arrangement. Singaporean citizens are also exempt due to free trade rules. The Overseas Investment Amendment Act was supported by the Labour–led coalition government but was opposed by the opposition centre-right National and libertarian ACT parties. It passed its third reading on 15 August 2018 and received royal assent on 22 August.

== Legislative features ==
The Overseas Investment Amendment Act 2018 amends the Overseas Investment Act 2005 to ensure that investments made by foreign persons benefit New Zealand. The Act would also enhance the information-gathering and enforcement powers of the Overseas Investment Office, which is responsible for administering the Act.

The Act amends the definition of "ordinarily resident in New Zealand" to require that they be permanent resident visa holders. Resident visa holders are not considered "ordinarily resident in New Zealand" under this amendment. Clause 11 of the Act allows overseas persons to purchase residential land if it is used to increase the supply of housing in New Zealand. Properties built on land purchased under this pathway must not be inhabited by the owner and must be sold once they have been built.

The Overseas Investment Amendment Act would require overseas buyers to seek approval from the Overseas Investment Office to purchase hotel units if the land was classified as "residential" or "lifestyle." Overseas investors are allowed to purchase and own units in hotels with more than 20 units provided they enter into a lease-back arrangement with the hotel's developer or operator. The Act also allows network utility operators such as electricity and gas distributors, telecommunications companies, and transmission network operators to acquire land without consent for business purposes.

The Act allows overseas persons to take leases of up to five years over residential land that is not classified as "sensitive land." The Act also has provisions for introducing a "streamlined approval path" for businesses to either purchase residential land for non-residential purposes or for residential purposes to support a business. Such purchases would be subject to conditions imposed by the Minister of Trade and Export Growth to ensure that the land is being used for the purposes it was purchased for.

The Act also imposes a fine of up to NZ$20,000 for those failing to comply with the Act's sections. In addition, the Act also covers overseas investments in sensitive land that involve forestry rights and establishes new tests for consent where an overseas investment in sensitive land relates to forestry.

== History ==
=== Background ===
The Overseas Investment Amendment Act 2018 was the result of an acute housing shortage in New Zealand during the early 21st century. In addition, national housing prices rose faster than incomes, with the gap rising from over 3.0 in January 2002 to 6.27 in March 2017. In 2017, a report by the International Monetary Fund ranked New Zealand as the most unaffordable country in the OECD and recommended the taxation of property speculation. That same year, the Demographia think-tank ranked Auckland's housing market the fourth-most unaffordable in the world — behind Hong Kong, Sydney and Vancouver — with median house prices rising from 6.4 times the median income in 2008 to 10 times in 2017.

The housing shortage was a major issue during the 2017 general election. The incumbent National Party campaigned to build 200,000 houses over the next six years while the opposition Labour Party vowed to build 100,000 houses over the next decade as part of its KiwiBuild scheme. The populist New Zealand First promised to restrict foreign investment and the sale of houses and farmland to New Zealand citizens and permanent residents. Labour also campaigned on banning foreign speculators from buying existing houses, taxing property speculators, and making it easier for first-time buyers to purchase homes.

=== Legislative passage ===
Following the 2017 general election held on 23 September 2017, none of the parties in the New Zealand House of Representatives had enough seats to govern alone. After several weeks of negotiations, the Labour and New Zealand First parties formed a coalition government on 19 October, with a confidence and supply agreement with the Green Party. On 14 December, the Overseas Investment Amendment Bill was introduced by Labour Member of Parliament David Parker. On 19 December, the Bill passed its first reading in with the support of Labour, NZ First, and the Greens parties while the opposition National Party voted against the bill (63:56).

The Overseas Investment Amendment Bill passed the select committee stage on 18 June 2018. On 26 June, the Bill passed its second reading with the support of Labour, NZ First, and the Greens. National and the libertarian ACT party voted against the bill (63:56). On 15 August, the Bill passed its third reading with the support of the Labour-led coalition while the National and ACT parties opposed the bill (63:57). The Overseas Investment Amendment Act received royal assent on 22 August, becoming law.

=== Proposed amendments ===
On 2 September, Prime Minister Christopher Luxon confirmed that the Sixth National Government would seek to amend the Overseas Investment Amendment Act 2018 to allow investor visa holders to buy homes with a minimum value of NZ$5million. In response, Labour leader and Opposition leader Chris Hipkins criticised the Government's plans to amend the foreign buyer ban, questioning the commitment of investor visa holders to living in New Zealand. By contrast, Bayleys residential national director Johnny Sinclair and Sotheby's International Realty managing director Mark Harris welcomed the proposed changes to the foreign buyer ban. Sinclair proposed retaining the NZ$5 million threshold for Auckland and Queenstown while Harris proposed a lower threshold for Wellington.
