= Graeme Harrison =

New Zealand business executive

Sir Graeme Harrison KNZM
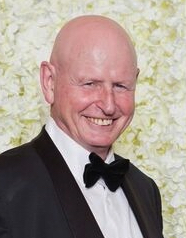
- Harrison in 2017
- Born: Graeme Thomas Harrison; 13 November 1948 (age 78); Methven, New Zealand
- Known for: Founder of ANZCO Foods

Sir Graeme Thomas Harrison KNZM (born 13 November 1948) is a New Zealand business executive. He was the driving force behind ANZCO Foods, which is New Zealand's fifth-largest exporter. He was at the helm of ANZCO Foods for 34 years until his retirement in 2018.

== Early life ==
Harrison was born in Methven in 1948. He received his education at Methven District High School, at Ashburton College, and at the University of Canterbury. He graduated with a Bachelor of Arts in 1969 and a Master of Arts with honours in 1971. He undertook further study at the Manchester Business School, where he graduated in 1979.

== Business career ==
From 1976 to 1979, Harrison was the London-based commercial manager of the New Zealand Meat Producers Board. From 1980 to 1983, he was the board's Assistant General Manager based in Wellington. From 1984, he was Managing Director of the Asian New Zealand Meat Company Limited, known under its trading name ANZCO Foods. He founded the company while he was in Japan. Initially, ANZCO Foods was owned through the New Zealand Meat Producers Board by individual farmers. In 1989, Japanese company Itoham Foods and ANZCO formed a 50–50 partnership and founded Five Star Beef, a company that operates a feedlot in Wakanui near Ashburton; this is New Zealand's largest feedlot and mainly exports to Japan. In 1995, the ANZCO management team led a buy-out of the company from the Meat Producers Board, with Itoham Foods taking a 48.3% minority shareholding and another Japanese company, Nissui (Nippon Suisan Kaisha Ltd), taking a smaller shareholding. Through that buy-out, the initial investment of NZ$350,000 returned over NZ$40m to the original owners. ANZCO Foods started operating under the new ownership arrangement on 17 August 1995.

In 2015, founder Harrison announced that he intended to retire in the near future. In the accompanying restructure in shareholding, Harrison sold down from just over 20% to 14%. In late 2017, Itoham Foods received Overseas Investment Office (OIO) approval to become to sole owner by obtaining the remaining 35% shareholding. Harrison retired from the company after the March 2018 annual general meeting; he had been at the helm of the company for 34 years, with his initial position of managing director followed as chairperson from 2004.

== Family and private life ==
In 1971, Harrison married Barbara Jean Buchly. They have three children; two girls (born 1973 and 1977) and one boy (born 1981). Harrison retired to Methven but takes an active role in a sheep and beef farm operated by his second daughter and her husband at nearby Alford Forest.

It was announced in September 2021 that Harrison was appointed to the board of the New Zealand National Party.

== Honours and awards ==
Harrison was awarded the New Zealand 1990 Commemoration Medal for services to international trade. In the 2011 Birthday Honours, Harrison was appointed a Knight Companion of the New Zealand Order of Merit, for services to business. In 2012, he was conferred with an honorary Doctor of Commerce degree by Lincoln University. Harrison was inducted into the New Zealand Business Hall of Fame in 2017.
