= Kokiri Tramway =

Coordinates: 42.4923°S 171.3872°E

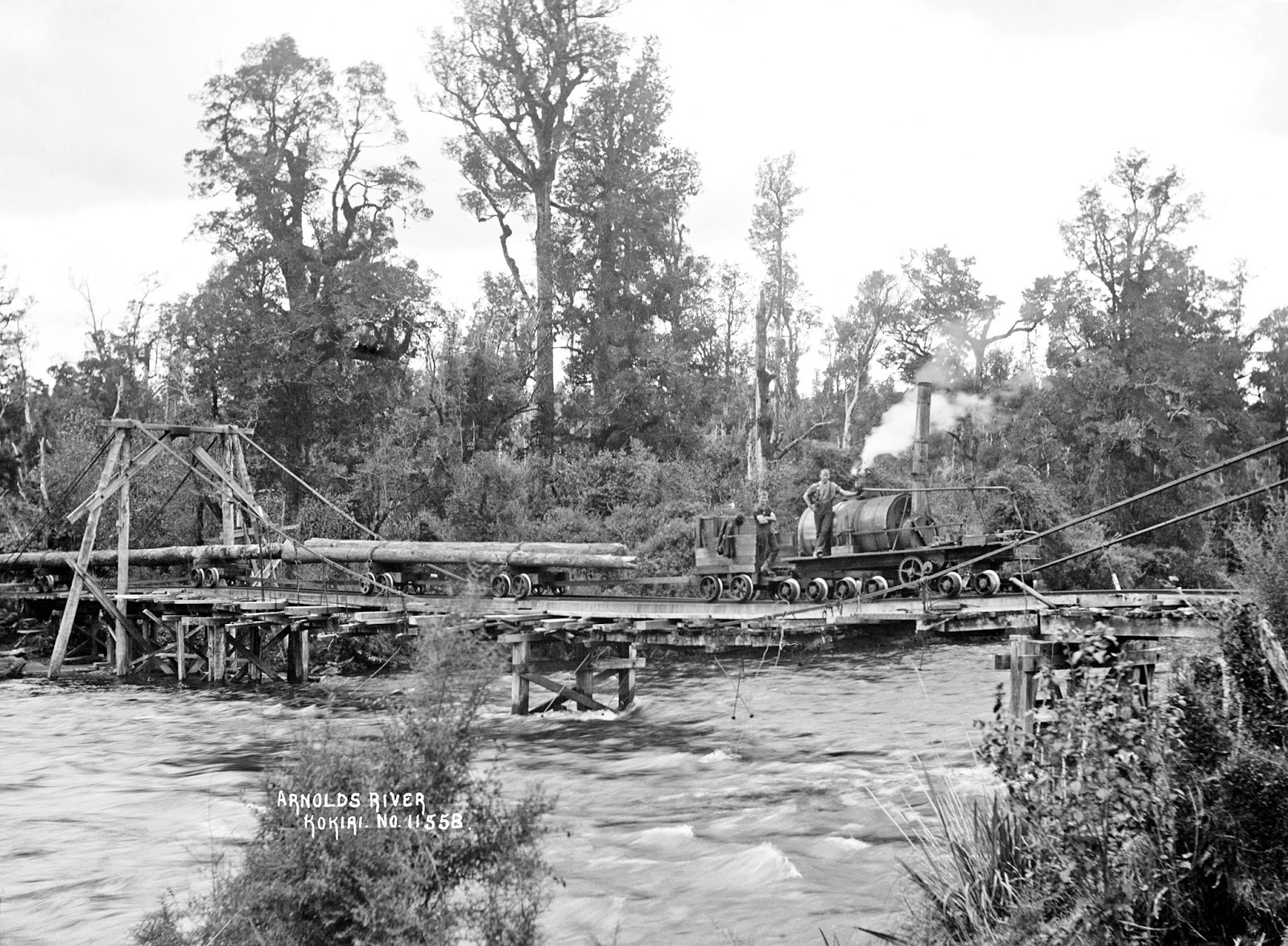
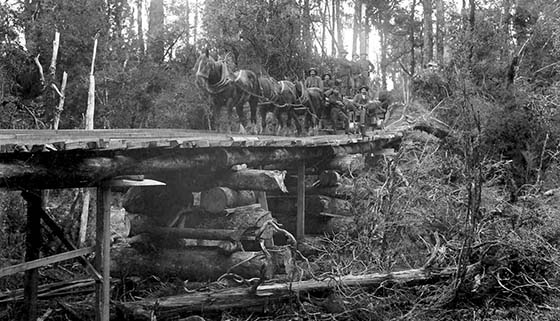
- Steam locomotive with logs, on a bridge over the Arnold River at Kokiri, 1900-30 Horse tram at Kokiri, circa 1890

Technical
- Track gauge: 1,067 mm (3 ft 6 in)

The Kokiri Tramway (flourished 1895 to 1902) was a bush tramway with a gauge of 1,067 mm (3 ft 6 in) near Kokiri on the Arnold River in the west of New Zealand's South Island .

== History ==
William James Butler (born on 18 March 1858 at Leamington, Warwickshire, England; died on 10 December 1932 at Wellington) and his brother Joseph Butler (born on 1 March 1862 at Leamington; died on 30 September 1934 in London) had by 1892 become so wealthy that they could purchase a large saw mill at Kokiri, from which they began exporting to Australia. At Kokiri they pioneered the use of a steam-powered log hauler in New Zealand, and in 1895 introduced a steam locomotive running on a wooden tramway. The use of the steam hauler resulted in great economy in hauling heavy logs from the bush. In fact, so powerful was the steam hauler that timber, which at one time had to be left in the bush, was taken out with but little trouble.

Their well-known sawmill, which was one of the largest in Westland and ranked amongst the leading sawmill businesses in the South Island, was a very complete one, capable of turning out 40,000 feet of timber per week. The machinery was of the latest pattern, and had been imported from England and America. The mill was kept working full time around 1906, to supply a brisk trade in New Zealand and Australia. In the sister colonies the name of Butler Brothers has been familiar to all users of New Zealand timbers. The firm's bush in Westland covered an area of 2000 acres, and consisted principally of red, white and silver pine. It shipped white pine in large quantities direct to Melbourne, where it was used in the manufacture of butter boxes.

Acting on the advice of a Government expert, the firm at one time exported, with other merchants, large quantities of timber to London, but the results were not encouraging. Between thirty and forty men were constantly employed in connection with the mills of the Butler Brothers, who, while in Westland, gained a high reputation for bridge building. The brothers sold their Kokiri mill in 1902 and subsequently focussed on a new business that they had set up as the White Pine Company of New Zealand to mill kauri and kahikatea at Naumai on the Wairoa River (Northland), which they exported completely to Australia.
