= Shane Jones =

New Zealand politician

The Honourable Shane Jones MP
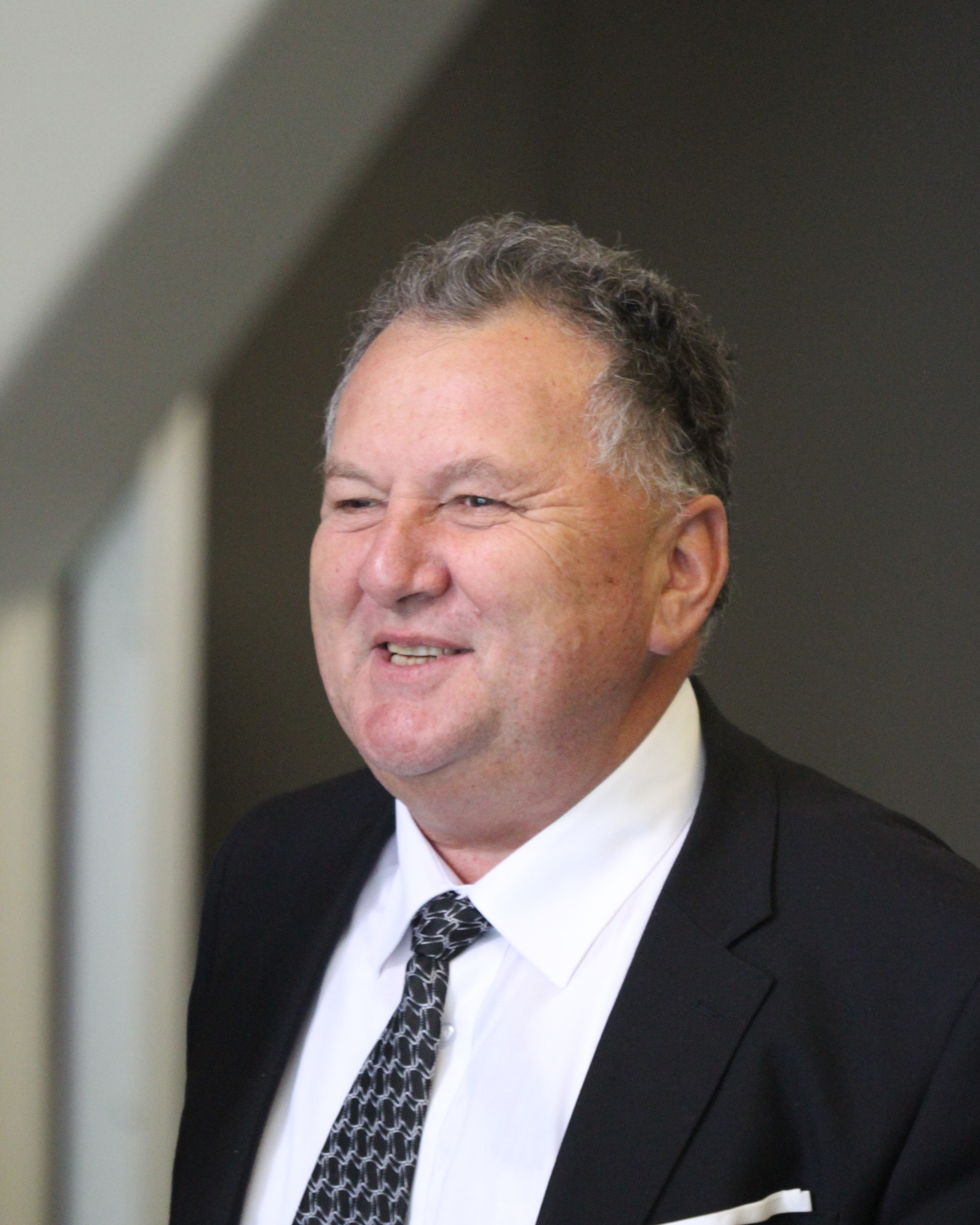
- Jones in April 2018

14th Minister for Oceans and Fisheries
- Incumbent
- Assumed office 27 November 2023
- Prime Minister: Christopher Luxon
- Preceded by: Rachel Brooking

6th Deputy Leader of New Zealand First
- Incumbent
- Assumed office 17 September 2025
- Leader: Winston Peters
- Preceded by: Fletcher Tabuteau

3rd Minister for Infrastructure
- In office 26 October 2017 – 6 November 2020
- Prime Minister: Jacinda Ardern
- Preceded by: Steven Joyce
- Succeeded by: Grant Robertson

31st Minister for Forestry
- In office 26 October 2017 – 6 November 2020
- Prime Minister: Jacinda Ardern
- Preceded by: Vacant (last held by David Carter)
- Succeeded by: Stuart Nash

1st Minister for Regional Economic Development
- In office 26 October 2017 – 6 November 2020
- Prime Minister: Jacinda Ardern
- Succeeded by: Stuart Nash

Minister for Building and Construction
- In office 31 October 2007 – 19 November 2008
- Prime Minister: Helen Clark
- Preceded by: Clayton Cosgrove
- Succeeded by: Maurice Williamson

Member of the New Zealand Parliament for New Zealand First list
- Incumbent
- Assumed office 14 October 2023
- In office 23 September 2017 – 17 October 2020

Member of the New Zealand Parliament for Labour Party list
- In office 17 September 2005 – 22 May 2014
- Succeeded by: Kelvin Davis (Note: Normally, list MPs do not have individual predecessors or successors, but Jones resigned during a sitting parliament and therefore was succeeded by Davis.)

Personal details
- Born: 3 September 1959 (age 67) Awanui, New Zealand
- Party: NZ First (2017–present)
- Other political affiliations: Labour (2005–2017)
- Spouses: Ngāreta Jones (died 2015); Dorothy Pumipi (m. 2018)
- Children: 7
- Education: Victoria University of Wellington; Harvard Kennedy School

Shane Geoffrey Jones (born 3 September 1959) is a New Zealand politician. He is deputy leader of New Zealand First and a Member of Parliament (MP) in the New Zealand House of Representatives.

Jones's political career began in 2005 as a list MP for the Labour Party. He became a cabinet minister in his first term, serving as Minister for Building and Construction in the Fifth Labour Government of New Zealand. Following Labour's defeat in the 2008 election, he was a senior opposition MP and unsuccessfully contested the leadership of the Labour Party in a 2013 leadership election. He left parliament the following year for a brief diplomatic career, before returning as a New Zealand First MP at the 2017 general election.

Jones was Minister for Regional Economic Development and Minister of Forestry in the Labour–New Zealand First coalition government from 2017 to 2020. He was elected for a fifth non-consecutive term in Parliament at the 2023 general election, and is Minister for Oceans and Fisheries, Minister for Regional Development, and Minister for Resources in the National–ACT–New Zealand First coalition government.

== Early life and career ==
Jones was born in Awanui, near Kaitaia, the eldest of six children to parents Peter, a farmer, and Ruth, a teacher. He is Māori, of Te Aupōuri and Ngāi Takoto descent, as well as having English, Welsh and Croatian ancestry. Jones's secondary education was at St Stephen's School, a boarding school for Māori boys in Bombay, south of Auckland. His time there overlapped with future Māori Party MPs Hone Harawira and Te Ururoa Flavell. He next studied at Victoria University of Wellington where he earned a Bachelor of Arts. In 1990, he was awarded a Harkness Fellowship to study at Harvard Kennedy School at Harvard University where he completed a Master of Public Administration. Jones returned to Victoria University in the 1990s as a lecturer in Māori studies. He is fluent in te reo Māori.

Jones was a public servant in the 1980s. He worked in the Māori secretariat in the Ministry for the Environment and later in the Department of the Prime Minister and Cabinet, providing advice to the Fourth Labour Government on settling Treaty of Waitangi breaches. When the Fourth National Government began the settlements process in the 1990s, he was appointed a member of the Treaty of Waitangi Fisheries Commission. He became chair of the commission in August 2000 and completed the allocation of fisheries resources among iwi in 2004. He also chaired the Māori-owned fishing corporation Sealord during which period the company was merged with Nippon Suisan Kaisha. A 2004 "power list" by the New Zealand Listener ranked him the ninth most powerful New Zealander.

== Labour Party, 2008–2014 ==
New Zealand Parliament
Years	Term	Electorate	List	Party
2005–2008	48th	List	27	Labour
2008–2011	49th	List	16	Labour
2011–2014	50th	List	16	Labour
2017–2020	52nd	List	8	NZ First
2023–2026	54th	List	2	NZ First
2026–present	55th	List	2	NZ First

Jones has been elected to Parliament for two political parties—first with the Labour Party for nine years from 2005 to 2014, then with New Zealand First from 2017 to 2020—and was a Cabinet minister under both affiliations. Although he had often been speculated by the media and among his colleagues as a future leader of the Labour Party, and indeed contested the Labour leadership in 2013, Jones's move away from Labour was not a surprise. Before his election as a Labour MP, Sir Graham Latimer had tried, unsuccessfully, to recruit him for the National Party. Instead, Jones joined Labour in part because he had been impressed by David Lange and the Fourth Labour Government. Over time he felt less comfortable in the "modern Labour Party," and openly stated in 2014 that he was not "naturally left-leaning." He had been speculated as a New Zealand First candidate since at least 2015 before joining the party in 2017, in part due to his close relationship with New Zealand First leader Winston Peters.

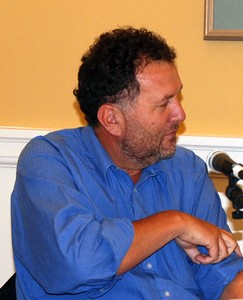
Jones in 2007

=== Fifth Labour Government, 2005–2008 ===
After the fisheries settlement was passed by Parliament in 2004, Jones announced he was interested in standing for the Labour Party at the upcoming election. He was approved as the candidate for the Northland electorate and was ranked 27 on the party list. This was the highest position given by Labour to someone who was not already a member of Parliament. While Jones did not win Northland, he entered Parliament as a list MP and was immediately made the chair of the Finance and Expenditure Select Committee.

On 31 October 2007, by then still in his first term, Jones was promoted into Cabinet. He became Minister for Building and Construction and held additional responsibilities as associate minister in charge of Treaty of Waitangi Negotiations, Immigration and Trade. He scrapped a government proposal requiring new buildings to have low flow showers heads, prior to the 2008 general election.

=== Opposition, 2008–2014 ===
Labour was defeated at the election and Jones contested the Northland electorate unsuccessfully, but was returned to parliament as a list member due to his high list placing of 16. Labour lost again in the 2011 election; Jones was defeated in Tāmaki Makaurau but remained a list MP. During his six years as an opposition MP, Jones held various portfolios in the Goff, Shearer and Cunliffe shadow cabinets including building and construction, infrastructure, economic development, transport, fisheries, forestry and Māori affairs.

He was twice removed from his portfolios under controversy. On 10 June 2010, after the release of ministerial credit card records, Jones admitted to having used a Crown credit card for personal expenditure, but assured the public that he had reimbursed the Crown in full for the expenditure. Later that day Jones admitted that he had used the card to hire pornographic films at hotels while on ministerial business. The credit card record showed that he chartered an executive jet for $1200, which he claimed was due to bad weather which forced a change in his schedule. Four days later, opposition leader Phil Goff demoted Jones along with two other Labour MPs for misuse of ministerial credit cards.

As Associate Minister of Immigration in 2008, Jones approved the citizenship application of Labour Party donor, Chinese businessman and later convicted money launderer William Yan, also known as Bill Liu. Four years later, Yan was charged with making false declarations on immigration documents. On 23 May 2012, Jones stood down from the front bench and his shadow portfolios while an investigation took place. Labour Party leader David Shearer asked the Auditor-General to investigate Jones's handling of the citizenship application. Jones had acted against officials' advice that he should decline the application because of questions about Yan's multiple identities and a warrant for his arrest in China. Jones defended his decision, saying it was based on humanitarian grounds because a high-level Government official had told him that Yan faced execution if he returned to China. Shearer said Jones supported the decision to refer the matter to the Auditor-General because Jones must be given a chance to clear his name. On 24 May 2012, Yan was found not guilty on all the immigration charges. The Auditor-General investigation commenced on 30 May 2012. When it reported back the following year, it found no evidence that there was any improper motive, collusion, or political interference in the decision to authorise citizenship.

In 2014, while economic development spokesperson, Jones alleged that Progressive Enterprises, owner of Countdown supermarkets, was involved in racketeering and extortion. A Commerce Commission investigation found no evidence to support the claims.

=== Leadership contest and resignation ===
David Shearer resigned the Labour leadership in August 2013. Jones was the second MP to declare his candidacy, following Shearer's former deputy leader Grant Robertson. The pair would be joined by the party's economic development spokesperson David Cunliffe, who secured sufficient support from party delegates to win the leadership. Jones later said his candidacy was to honour Labour stalwart Parekura Horomia who had died earlier that year. Jones won the votes of seven out of 34 caucus colleagues and a minority of members' and affiliated unions' votes. Crucially, he did not have the support of senior Māori Labour MPs Nanaia Mahuta and Louisa Wall. Ten years later, The Spinoff founder Duncan Grieve would write Jones's candidacy was less an "expectation of success than [a] signal he felt his banishment had ended."

On 22 April 2014, Jones announced his intention to step down as a Labour Party MP, leaving at the end of May. He was appointed to the newly created role of Pacific Economic Ambassador by Foreign Affairs Minister Murray McCully. Kelvin Davis succeeded him as Labour list MP.

== New Zealand First, 2017–present ==
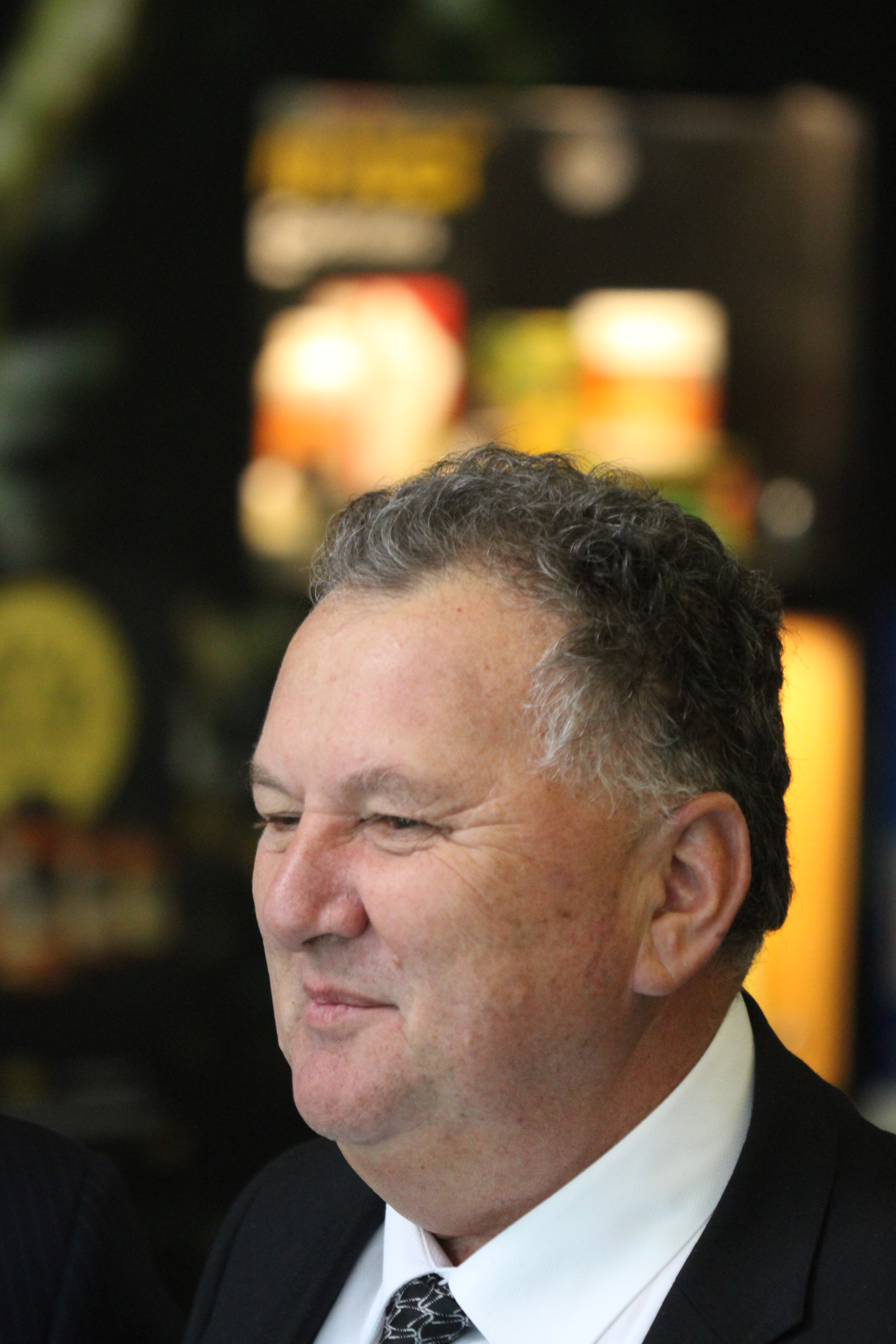
Shane Jones (Economic Development Minister) at an event at Victoria University of Wellington in 2018

=== 2017–2020 term ===
On 30 June 2017, after months of speculation, Jones was confirmed as the New Zealand First candidate for Whangarei for the 2017 general election. Jones was also placed eighth on the party list for New Zealand First, above some of the members of the New Zealand First caucus of the Parliament at the time, increasing his chances of re-entering Parliament. New Zealand online magazine The Spinoff hosted a live debate on Facebook with seven of the 2017 election's candidates that the magazine found "most exciting", including Jones, representing New Zealand First. Jones placed third in Whangarei, behind National candidate Shane Reti and Labour candidate Tony Savage, but was elected as one of New Zealand First's nine list MPs.

New Zealand First held the balance of power. Jones was part of the negotiating team that ultimately saw Winston Peters select a coalition with Labour over National. Jones was appointed Minister for Infrastructure, Minister of Forestry and Minister for Regional Economic Development, Associate Minister of Finance and Associate Minister of Transport. As Minister for Regional Economic Development Jones was responsible for the $3 billion Provincial Growth Fund and announced a number of grants for the development of various regions, e.g. for Southland, the West Coast, the Wairarapa and Kaipara District. The first grants in February 2018 included $6 million for the Whanganui rail line, $5 million for the Napier-Wairoa rail line and $2.3 million for the Gisborne port. Further grants were announced for Hillside Engineering in South Dunedin ($20 million) as a major heavy engineering and KiwiRail servicing hub. The fund was criticised by National for being a "slush fund" targeted toward marginal electorates and for the links between some fund applications and New Zealand First.

Jones continued to court controversy in his new party. On 25 September 2019, Jones and Labour MP Kieran McAnulty were ejected from Parliament by the Speaker of the House Trevor Mallard after trading barbs with National MPs during a parliamentary debate about Prime Minister Jacinda Ardern's meeting with US President Donald Trump.

As Forestry Minister, Jones's flagship policy was to plant one billion trees. A farmers' protest in November 2019 against the Government's forestry policy caught Jones's ire; he described them as "rednecks." Federated Farmers vice president Andrew Hoggard described Jones's comments as unhelpful and alleged that the Government was ignoring the agricultural sector's concerns. In 2020, Jones described climate change activists for advocating reduced meat consumption as "medieval torture chamber workers" hellbent on "preaching this gospel of absolutism" in response to the Government's recent announcement that they would be introducing climate change education in schools.

=== Out of Parliament, 2020–2023 ===
Jones was selected as New Zealand First's Northland candidate for the 2020 general election. He was defeated, coming third place with 5,119 votes behind Labour's Willow-Jean Prime (17,066) and National's Matt King (16,903). New Zealand First also lost all its parliamentary seats, gaining only 2.6% percent of the party vote, below the five percent threshold needed to enter Parliament. The day after the election, Jones, hungover and dressed in a t-shirt and baseball cap, was one of the first New Zealand First MPs to address media, saying he was "astounded" with Labour's success in the election. Since leaving Parliament for the second time, Jones has provided media commentary critical of the Sixth Labour Government.

In the 2023 general election, Jones stood as New Zealand First's Northland candidate and was ranked second on the party list. During the campaign, he was described as New Zealand First's deputy leader and finance spokesperson and advocated for greater investment in regional New Zealand. (He was not officially elected as deputy leader of New Zealand First until September 2025.) In mid-August 2023, he released a TikTok video of himself singing to the tune of the American rock band Journey's song "Don't Stop Believin'". Jones also used the song to highlight his role in promoting the Government's Provincial Growth Fund. He polled in third place in the electorate. With New Zealand First winning 6.08% of the party vote, he returned to Parliament for a fifth term as a list MP.

=== Sixth National Government, 2023–present ===
Jones was appointed the Minister for Oceans and Fisheries, Minister for Regional Development, Minister for Resources, Associate Minister of Finance and Associate Minister of Energy in the Sixth National Government of New Zealand on 27 November 2023.

On 17 September 2025, Jones was elected by the New Zealand First parliamentary caucus as the party's deputy leader.

==== Oceans and Fisheries ====
In late March 2024, Jones as Fisheries Minister announced the Government had halted work on legislation to create a 620,000 km^{2} (240,000 sq mi) ocean sanctuary around the Kermadec Islands.

In July 2024, Jones expressed interest in expanding the aquaculture sector in his capacity as Minister for Oceans and Fisheries. Jones told the news website Newsroom that the aquaculture sector faced fewer barriers and offered more opportunities than the wool, dairy and meat sectors. In addition, Jones said that the aquaculture industry lacked the "cacophony of voices currently protesting New Zealand's farming footprint."

On 12 February 2025, Jones announced that the Government would be making changes to the Quota Management System including excluding ship camera footage from Official Information Act requests. The Green Party expressed concerns that these changes would reduce accountability in the fishing sector.

As fisheries minister, Jones sponsored the Fisheries Amendment Bill, which proposed scrapping most legal-size limits for commercial fishing operators, allowing them to retain and sell small fish including snapper, tarakihi and trevally. Following pressure from Prime Minister Luxon and NZ First leader Peters, he removed the clause scrapping legal-size limits from the proposed bill in late March 2026, Jones's proposal also attracted opposition from Greenpeace Aotearoa New Zealand, recreational fisheries advocacy group LegaSea and Ultimate Fishing television host Matt Watson. On 31 March, Jones's fisheries bill passed its first reading in Parliament. He used his speech to remind the National and ACT parties of the National-NZ First coalition commitment to ease regulations on the fisheries sector. On 18 June, the Fisheries Amendment Bill's passage to Parliament was delayed until after the 2026 New Zealand general election at Jones's request.

==== Resources and regional development ====
In June 2024, Jones announced that the Government would introduce legislation to reverse the previous Labour Government's ban on oil and gas exploration in the second half of 2024. He also confirmed that the Government would also amend legislation to make it easier for companies to get permission for oil exploration. Jones argued that reversing the ban on oil and gas exploration would help attract investment and promote economic growth and jobs. The Green Party's co-leader Chlöe Swarbrick said that reversing the ban would worsen climate change while Labour's energy spokesperson Megan Woods criticised the Government for ignoring alternative, renewable energy sources.

As Minister for Resources, Jones sponsored the Crown Minerals Amendment Act 2025, which repealed the previous Labour government's 2018 ban on new permits for gas and oil exploration off the coast of Taranaki. The bill passed into law in late July 2025 with the support of the governing coalition parties.

On 16 August 2025, Jones was confronted by about 100 environmental protesters during his visit to Whangārei. The protesters voiced opposition to two fast-track projects including the construction of a marina in Waipiro Bay and proposed offshore sand mining in Bream Bay. In response, Jones argued the fast-track projects would aid the economic development of the Northland Region.

On 1 September 2025, Jones confirmed that the Government would allocate NZ$30 million from the Regional Development Fund to provide loans to supporting regional airlines.

In late January 2026, Newsroom reported that Jones had been involved in New Zealand's negotiations to supply critical rare earth minerals to the United States as part of the multilateral Minerals Security Partnership. Jones had linked the deal to attracting foreign investment in the mining sector amidst a global demand for rare earth minerals. The Waitangi Tribunal had expressed concern that a "backdoor" bilateral deal with the United States without Māori input would violate the New Zealand Crown's Treaty of Waitangi obligations to Māori. By April 2026, mineral negotiations had resumed. Jones voiced support for a multilateral agreement, saying it would be preferable for critics who balked at the idea of a bilateral export agreement with the second Trump Administration.

In March 2026, Jones was challenged to a debate with Sir Ian Taylor in regards to the proposed Santana Minerals Bendigo-Ophir gold mine. Despite initially accepting, Jones pulled out of the debate less than two weeks before the scheduled date.

In mid-June 2026, Jones sought retrospective approval from the New Zealand Cabinet for an additional NZ$33,068 in taxpayer funds to cover a February 2025 trip to Canada to attend the Prospectors and Developers Association of Canada's mining convention. While originally allocated a ministerial budget of $30,000, Jones's Canadian travel expenses had cost a total of NZ$63,000 due to the inclusion of a private limousine and two Qantas business-class flights (worth $40,000). Jones's travel expenses drew criticism from Finance Minister Nicola Willis, who said he had made "significant errors." In response, Jones attributed the spending blowup to an administrative error by government officials. NZ First leader Peters also defended Jones's spending, claiming that the government travel budget for ministers was too low.

==== Associate energy ====
In early August 2024, Jones accused electrical utility companies of exploiting soaring energy bills and said that the Government was seeking advice on potential regulatory intervention in the energy sector.

In April 2026, Jones confirmed that the New Zealand Government would allocate over $20 million from the Regional Infrastructure Fund to recommissioning diesel storage tanks at the former Marsden Point Oil Refinery's import and storage terminal. This investment would support 90 million litres of fuel storage.

==== Miscellaneous ====
In late June 2025, Jones confirmed that he was drafting a member's bill into Parliament seeking to force the Māori iwi (tribe) Ngāpuhi into a single commercial Treaty of Waitangi settlement. He said that the bill would focus on good governance, economic development and would exclude indigenous sovereignty, which he described as a "diversion" that the New Zealand taxpayer could not afford. Labour MP Peeni Henare, who is of Ngāpuhi descent, described Jones's proposal as misguided and said that it would breach the "good faith" provisions of Treaty settlements. On 24 June, Jones stated that NZ First would campaign on how taxpayer money was being used for Treaty settlements at the 2026 general election. In late October 2026, Jones reiterated his pledge to introduce a bill forcing Ngāpuhi to sign a Treaty settlement within the first 100 days of a new government that included NZ First.

==== 2026 general election ====
During New Zealand First's election campaign launch on 19 July, Jones confirmed that he would be contesting the Northland electorate at the 2026 New Zealand general election. He was ranked second place on the party list. On 7 November, Jones came third place in the Northland contest with 5,750 votes based on preliminary results. He was re-elected to Parliament on the NZ First party list.

== Political views ==
=== Conscience votes ===
Jones voted in favour of the Marriage (Definition of Marriage) Amendment Bill to legalise same-sex marriage in New Zealand in 2012 and 2013. He supported the End of Life Choice Bill at all stages in 2017 and 2019. He supported the Abortion Legislation Bill at its first and second readings in 2019 and 2020.

=== Demographics and immigration ===
Jones attracted criticism when he made a series of anti-Indian remarks in October and November 2019 and again in February 2020. In response to members of the Indian New Zealand community's criticism of Immigration New Zealand's recent decision to tighten partnership visas for those on arranged marriages, Jones had said:

I would just say to the activists from the Indian community, tame down your rhetoric, you have no legitimate expectations in my view to bring your whole village to New Zealand and if you don't like it and you're threatening to go home – catch the next flight home.

Jones's comments were condemned by the Waitakere Indian Association, who called on Ardern and Minister for Ethnic Communities Jenny Salesa to demand a public apology from Jones and to address the Indian community's concerns. A rally in protest of Jones's remarks was held on 3 November 2019 by members of the Migrant Workers Association and Love Aotearoa Hate Racism. Jones's remarks were also condemned by the broadcaster Patrick Gower, who described Jones as a "gutless wonder." Ardern, Trade Minister Damien O'Connor, and Immigration Minister Iain Lees-Galloway have disavowed Jones's remarks as not representative of the New Zealand Government. On 5 November 2019, Jones described the community response as a "Bollywood reaction" and claimed that he was speaking for New Zealanders who were anxious about immigration. On 6 November 2019, the Government reversed the partnership visa decision, restoring the exception for non-resident Indian marriages.

The following year, Jones claimed in a television interview that immigration was placing "enormous stress" on the country's social and economic infrastructure and that the large number of international students from India had ruined New Zealand tertiary institutions. Jones's remarks were criticised by Ardern, the Waitakere Indian Association, National Party leader Simon Bridges, Green Party co-leader James Shaw, and Labour MP Iain Lees-Galloway. The Race Relations Commissioner Meng Foon also condemned them as "racist, ignorant and harmful." Jones defended his comments, claiming that members of the Indian community were exploiting their own people.

On 29 January 2025, Jones faced criticism for shouting "Send the Mexicans home!" during a debate in Parliament. He later said "If these foreign-born New Zealanders are not going to show respect to the culture of New Zealand, then I'm going to call them out." Green Party immigration spokesperson Ricardo Menéndez March condemned Jones's comments, arguing that they emboldened xenophobia and were intended to spark division. He compared Jones's remarks to rhetoric used by U.S. President Donald Trump. The Green Party formally raised concerns with Prime Minister Christopher Luxon, calling for accountability. In response, Luxon refused to confirm whether he would discipline Jones but advised other MPs to "watch their language." After the Mexican Embassy raised concerns about Jones's remarks, Peters met with the Mexican Ambassador at Waitangi during the Waitangi Day events in early February 2025.

In advance of the 2025 New Zealand First annual meeting, Jones complained that immigration was changing the country's demographics. He remarked that New Zealand was "changing irreversibly" on a cultural level, citing that the most common baby names were now "Singh" and "Patel". Indian New Zealanders interviewed by RNZ News rejected the comments, noting that Indian immigration has a long history in New Zealand, with some families going back over a century and that Jones's "racist" comments exemplified divisive rhetoric that has been used for decades to exclude immigrants and their descendants. Jones did not respond when asked for comment. In a later opinion article for The Post, columnist Ben Thomas criticised Jones's remarks, writing that he "didn’t so much dip his toe in the topic of increasing Indian immigration as cannonball off a railbridge into it" and dismissing Jones's comments as a "diatribe".

In mid April 2026, Jones attracted controversy after making racially-tinged remarks targeting Indian migrants during an interview with the online radio station Reality Check Radio. Jones had opposed the proposed India-New Zealand agreement on the grounds that it would allow "unfettered" immigration into New Zealand, stating: "I don't care how much criticism I get. I am never going to agree with a butter chicken tsunami coming to New Zealand." Jones's remarks drew criticism from across the New Zealand political spectrum including Prime Minister Christopher Luxon, Deputy Prime Minister and ACT party leader David Seymour, Labour leader Chris Hipkins, National Party MP Carlos Cheung, ACT MP Parmjeet Parmar and Immigration Minister Erica Stanford, who described them as "unhelpful" and offensive to Indian New Zealanders. Several Indian community leaders including Auckland Indian Association president Shanti Patel, New Zealand Indian Central Association Veer Khar, NZ Indian Business Association general secretary Jaspreet Kandhari and the New Zealand Sikh Society Hamilton's former president Yugraj Singh Mahil also expressed disapproval and condemnation of Jones's remarks. In response, Jones defended his comments and reiterated his criticism of the India-New Zealand free trade agreement, stating "immigration has been snuck into the free trade deal in a way that does not reflect the expectations of Kiwis". Jones's remarks also attracted coverage in the Indian and international media.

=== Judiciary ===
In mid-February 2024, Jones criticised the Supreme Court of New Zealand for permitting climate activist Mike Smith to pursue legal action against several polluters, describing the ruling as the "Americanisation" of New Zealand's judiciary. Jones also claimed that the tobacco industry was being demonised by politicians, stating "that there's a great deal of catastrophisation and tainting going on with these people in the tobacco industry. They're running an industry that still, the last time I checked, was a legitimate part of the economy."

=== Local government reform ===
In late June 2025, Jones suggested abolishing regional councils while addressing a Local Government New Zealand conference. He said that his party NZ First did not see a "compelling case" for regional councils to continue after the National-led coalition government had replaced the Resource Management Act 1991. Jones also said that the Otago and Waikato Regional Councils were obstructing economic development by blocking mining and marine farming permits. In response, the Bay of Plenty Regional Council's chair Doug Leeder said that regional councils played an important role in managing natural resources, flood protection, public transport delivery, emergency management functions, regional planning and biosecurity.

=== Māori issues ===
In late January 2024, Jones along with his New Zealand First and National parties colleagues including Winston Peters and Prime Minister Christopher Luxon attended the Rātana Church's special annual hui (meeting). During his speech, Jones expressed support for reviewing the powers of the Waitangi Tribunal, stating: "An institution that's been around for 50 years should not expect to continue on uncritically for another set of decades without being reviewed.".

During his 2024 Waitangi Day speech on 6 February, Jones defended the Government's proposed Treaty Principles Bill and rejected opposition claims that the Government was degrading tino rangatiratanga (self determination). He also said that the Government was funding wānanga (Māori tertiary institutions) and marae (meeting houses). During Māori King Tūheitia Paki's 18th Koroneihana (coronation anniversary celebration) in mid-August 2024, Jones reiterated that NZ First would not support the Treaty Principles Bill beyond its first reading.

In mid April 2024, the Waitangi Tribunal summoned ACT MP and Minister for Children Karen Chhour to an urgent hearing on the Government's plans to repeal Section 7AA of the Oranga Tamariki Act 1989. In response, Jones told Waatea News during an interview that "the Waitangi Tribunal has no business running its operations as some sort of star chamber delivering summons for ministers to rock up and be cross-examined or grilled." Jones's remarks were criticised as inappropriate by the Māori Law Society, who complained to Prime Minister Christopher Luxon and Attorney-General Judith Collins. They asked whether Jones's remarks breached the Cabinet Manual and for the Government to uphold the integrity of the judicial arm.

=== Tobacco ===
Jones has attracted scrutiny due to his links to the tobacco industry and New Zealand First successfully pressing for the repeal of smoke free legislation as part of its coalition agreement with the National Party. According to Radio New Zealand, Philip Morris International's external relations director and former NZ First staffer Api Dawson attended Jones's swearing-in ceremony at Parliament in late 2023. Jones also confirmed that Dawson was involved in "soundings" about the party's tobacco policy. In March 2024, when Jones was asked if he was complying with the WHO Framework Convention on Tobacco Control, which "obliges its parties to protect policy from tobacco industry influence and be completely transparent in its dealings with the industry", he stated that he did not know about it and was not interested in it.

== Personal life ==
Jones has seven children with his first wife Ngāreta, from whom he separated in 2011; she died from cancer in 2015. Jones began a relationship with former beauty queen Dorothy (Dot) Pumipi in 2011 while she was his campaign manager; they married in 2018.

On 5 April 2025, Jones and Dot were confronted by a man at Auckland Airport, who shouted "profane abuse" about Jones and New Zealand First leader Winston Peters. When Dot attempted to intervene between the two men, her hand hit his nose, and the man allegedly grabbed her shoulder, causing her to lose her balance and fall. The couple subsequently filed a police report against the man.

Jones has been photographed wearing a "Make New Zealand Great Again" hat.

== Notes ==
Political offices
Preceded by Clayton Cosgrove	Minister for Building and Construction; 2007–2008	Succeeded by Maurice Williamson
Preceded by Steven Joyce	Minister for Infrastructure; 2017–2020	Succeeded by Grant Robertson
In abeyance Included in role of Minister for Primary Industries Title last held by David Carter	Minister for Forestry; 2017–2020	Succeeded by Stuart Nash
New ministerial post	Minister for Regional Economic Development; 2017–2020	Succeeded by Stuart Nash
