= Kokiri =

Kokiri Kokiri (Māori)
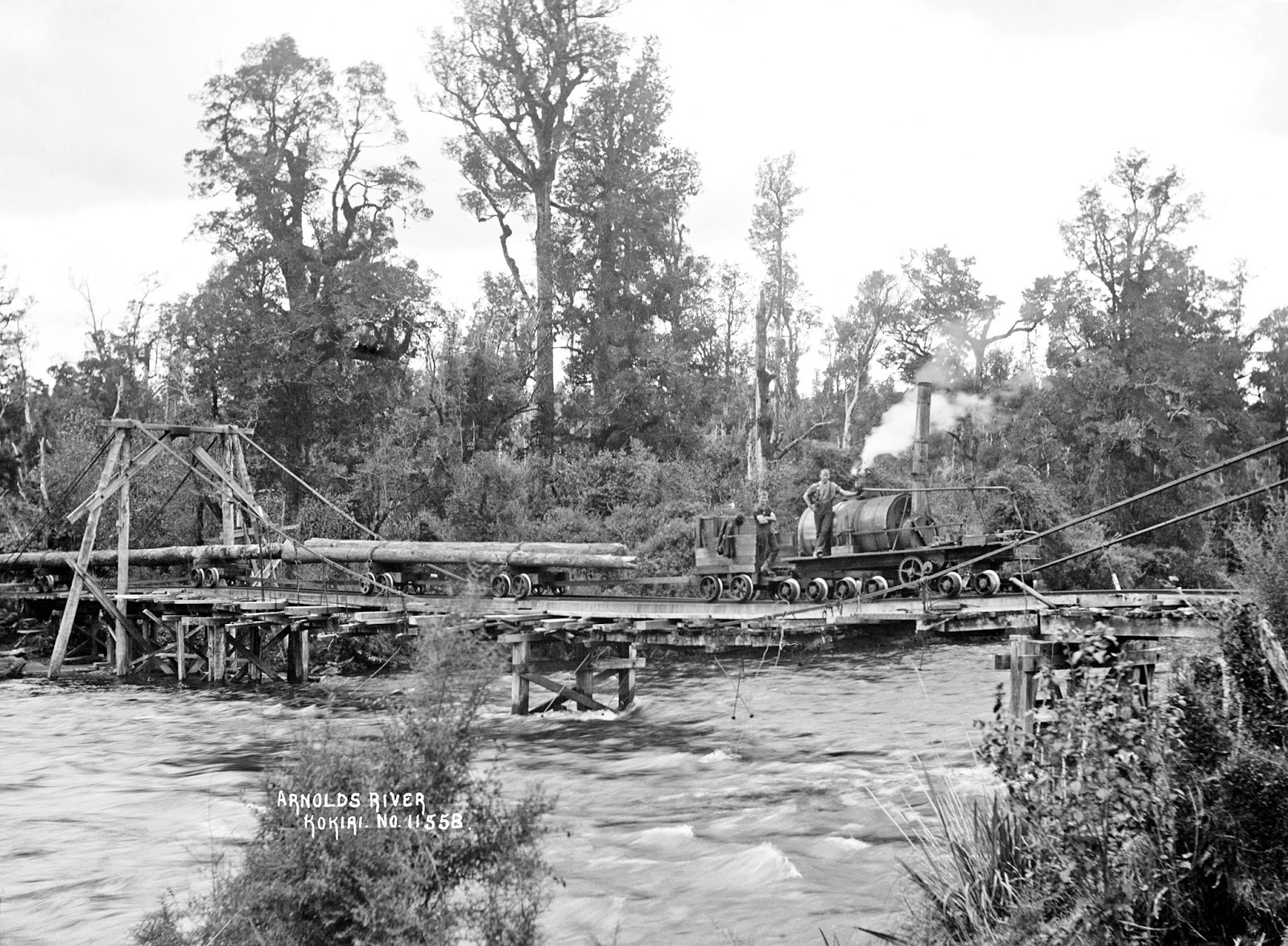
- Train at Kokiri in 1900

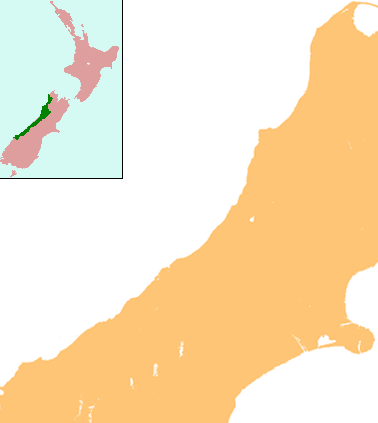
- Location within West Coast
- Coordinates: 42°29′49″S 171°23′8″E
- Country: New Zealand
- Region: West Coast
- District: Grey District

Government
  - MP: Damien O'Connor (Labour)

Kokiri is a settlement with a railway station on the Arnold River in the west of New Zealand's South Island.

== Location ==
Kokiri lies on the Greymouth-Christchurch railway line, fourteen miles from Greymouth, and thirty-seven miles from Otira. It is also five miles from Stillwater Junction, and its railway station stands at an altitude of 79 feet (24 m) above sea level. The settlement is on the western bank of the Arnold river, in the Maori Creek riding of the Grey County.

== History ==
Kokiri became at the beginning of the 20th century one of the principal seats of the sawmilling industry, and many thousands of feet of timber and white pine sleepers were sent annually to Greymouth for export. The Kokiri Tramway and the sawmills of Baxter Brothers (William James Butler and Joseph Butler) and of Messrs Stratford, Blair, and Company gave employment to a considerable number of men.

In 1906 there was a railway flag station at the township, a post and telephone office, a State school and an hotel. A few small farms in the vicinity are held by some of the workers at the sawmills. At Maori Gully, close by, there were several good goldmining claims. The bush around the township consisted chiefly of silver pine, white pine and red pine, and beech, commonly called birch. There was game in the neighbourhood, and fishing in the river. At the census of 1901 the population was 103.

== See also ==
- Kokiri Tramway
