= Independent Fisheries =

New Zealand fishing company

- Company type: Private
- Founded: 1960
- Parent: Sealord Group
- Website: www.indfish.co.nz

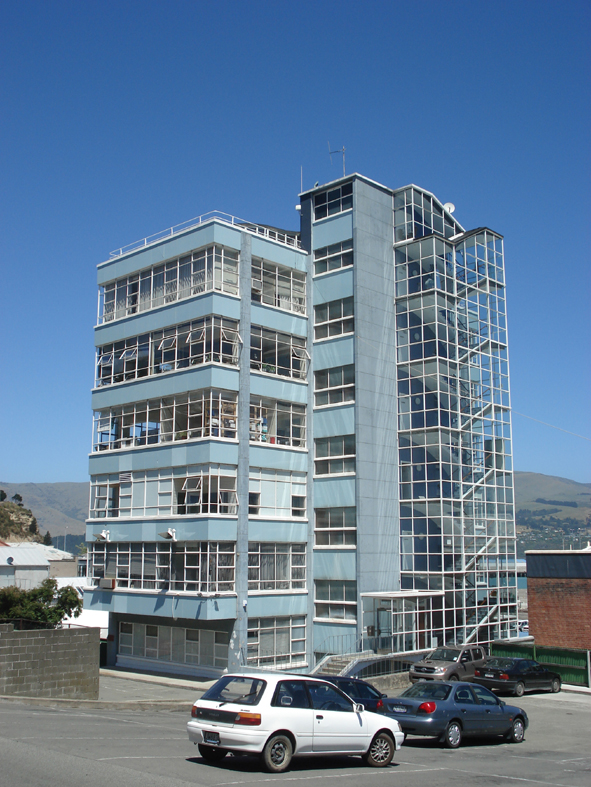
Shadbolt House in 2008

Independent Fisheries is one of the largest privately owned fishing companies of New Zealand. It started as a suburban fish and chip shop in 1956, became a fishing company in 1960, grew to acquire multiple ships and storage facilities, and has more than 500 employees. At its peak, the company employed over 1,000 people. The company specialises in catching barracouta, jack mackerel, southern blue whiting and arrow squid. It mainly exports to Australia.

== History ==
Howard Shadbolt started what eventually became Independent Fisheries in Christchurch in 1956. It was originally a fish and chip shop in the suburb of Linwood. It evolved into Independent Fisheries which was established 1960. Shadbolt retired from the company in 1980, and his son, Charles Shadbolt took over. Charles Shadbolt received the New Zealand Order of Merit in the 2017 New Year Honours, and died in February 2017.

In 1974 the company built a factory in Woolston. Severe damage from the 2011 Christchurch earthquake and competition from Asia forced the factory to close on 18 December 2013. The closure led to the loss of over 200 jobs. Shadbolt House, once owned by the Lyttelton Port Company, and acquired by Independent Fisheries in the 1990s, was also damaged in the Christchurch earthquake and was vacated in 2011. Independent Fisheries tried to fix the building, but its age, having been built in 1959, made it cost prohibitive to repair; demolition began in October 2012, with the expectation that it would take a month. Shadbolt House housed Independent Fisheries' fleet operation. After the demolition, the company planned on building a commercial or retail development on the site.

In 1992, Independent Fisheries opened a cool store in Lyttelton. The company started operating a 43-metre-long (141 ft) fishing vessel in 1997, Independent 1, which allowed for processing fish that had recently been frozen on board its deep-sea trawler. It requires two crews of 36, and was sold to Sealord in 2011, after it had already been chartered for three years. They later renamed it to Aukaha. In mid-2016 the company started operating a vessel known as FV Irvinga. Due to a work shortage, three of the company's vessels sat in the port of Lyttelton for months starting in August 2020. Foreign workers arrived in October with the intention to begin working after 14 days' managed COVID-19 isolation.

Between December 2007 and June 2011, Independent Fisheries donated a total of $17,500 to Labour MP Clayton Cosgrove, who had drafted a bill that if passed, would financially benefit Independent Fisheries. When asked on the Newshub Nation television programme about whether he had a conflict of interest, he responded by saying that he did not as he had no preconditions. He said that the questions about the donations were a "smear campaign" by the National Party.

In September 2017, Independent Fisheries was forced to dump 30,000 kg (66,000 lb) of southern blue whiting to save a ship. This incident later led to charges in May 2019 of making a false or misleading statement in records under the Fisheries Act, and failing to declare their 30,000 kg loss of fish. The judge said that "The captain was faced with a real and potentially life-threatening event when the broken trawl warp (towing line) became entangled around the propeller of the ship", and that the company had no intention of being deceitful. The counsel for Independent Fisheries called it an "unintentional offending".

In September 2023 Sealord Group agreed to acquire Independent Fisheries. After the Commerce Commission approved the deal in November, Sealord bought the company in February 2024.
