= OpenSC (company) =

OpenSC Pty Ltd
- Company type: Private
- Founded: 2019 in Sydney, Australia
- Founders: WWF Australia; BCG Digital Ventures
- Headquarters: Sydney, Australia
- Key people: Markus Mutz (CEO)
- Products: Supply chain transparency platform
- Website: opensc.org

OpenSC is a company and digital platform that tracks individual products throughout their supply chain. It uses the data to verify companies' sustainable production claims. Consumers can then view the product's history by scanning a QR code with their mobile device. OpenSC was launched in 2019 as a joint venture by World Wildlife Fund (WWF) Australia and BCG Digital Ventures.

== History ==
=== Pilot and launch ===
In 2017, WWF Australia ran a small-scale pilot program tracing tuna from fisheries in the Pacific Ocean as part of the WWF's Panda Labs program. Using data and experience from that project, WWF Australia collaborated with BCG Digital Ventures on the blockchain tracking platform, OpenSC. The platform was designed to verify sustainable production claims and track food through its supply chain, and planned to start out tracking fish and beef before broadening its scope.

OpenSC was officially launched on 17 January 2019. OpenSC-tracked food was served at the company's launch event in Sydney and later at a meeting of the World Economic Forum in Switzerland. Markus Mutz has been OpenSC's CEO since its outset.

=== Initial business partners and investors ===
Austral Fisheries, which is a part of the global Japanese seafood company Maruha Nichiro, was one of the initial companies to adopt the OpenSC platform to track their fish and prawns. In July 2019, it was announced that Nestlé would start a pilot program to track food using the OpenSC platform. As part of the program, Nestlé will trace its milk from producers in New Zealand to its own Middle East-based factories and warehouses. It also plans to use OpenSC to trace its palm oil supply chains in the Americas at a future date.

In September 2019, it was announced that OpenSC had raised $4 million (USD) in funding to assist with the further development of its platform. Investors included Working Capital and Swiss angel investor, Christian Wenger.

== Platform ==
The OpenSC platform uses real-time data to verify a product was produced in an ethical or sustainable way, and then tracks it throughout its entire supply chain. OpenSC focuses on improving supply chain transparency for commodities with "significant" known environmental or human rights risks, and its tracking data is designed to help companies and consumers ensure that products are ethically and sustainably sourced. Consumers can scan a QR code a menu or on the product itself to view the data, which is stored on an open blockchain.
