= ANZCO Foods =

New Zealand meat producer

ANZCO Foods Limited
- Type: Subsidiary
- Industry: Meat production
- Founded: 1984 in New Zealand
- Founder: Graeme Harrison
- Headquarters: Christchurch, New Zealand
- Area served: Worldwide (80 countries)
- Products: Beef and lamb
- Revenue: ▲$147.7 million (2022)
- Owner: Itoham Foods
- Number of employees: 3,000
- Website: anzcofoods.com

ANZCO Foods or simply ANZCO (formally ANZCO Foods Ltd and previously the Asian New Zealand Meat Company Limited) is a New Zealand meat producer fully owned by the Japanese company Itoham Foods, which in turn is part of Itoham Yonekyu Holdings. In 2016, ANZCO Foods was New Zealand's fifth-largest exporter, with a turnover of NZ$1.5b, and 3,000 employees.

== History ==
ANZCO started as a company in 1984 under the legal name Asian New Zealand Meat Company Limited owned through the New Zealand Meat Producers Board by individual farmers and led by Graeme Harrison. In 1989, Itoham Foods and ANZCO formed a 50–50 partnership and founded Five Star Beef, a company that operates a feedlot in Wakanui near Ashburton; this is New Zealand's largest feedlot and mainly exports to Japan. In 1995, the ANZCO management team led a buy-out of the company from the Meat Producers Board, with Itoham Foods taking a 48.3% minority shareholding and another Japanese company, Nissui (Nippon Suisan Kaisha Ltd), taking a smaller shareholding. Through that buy-out, the initial investment of NZ$350,000 returned over NZ$40m to the original owners. ANZCO Foods started operating under the new ownership arrangement on 17 August 1995.

In 2015, founder Harrison announced that he intended to retire in the near future. This was accompanied by a restructure in shareholding. With approval from the Overseas Investment Office (OIO), Itoham Foods increased its shareholding from 48.3% to 65% and paid just over NZ$40m for these transactions. The seven smallest shareholders were all offered to sell. Harrison himself sold down from just over 20% to 14%. Nissui sold part of its stake at this point (which made up just over 50% of the share transfer) with the balance coming from New Zealand shareholders.

In late 2017, Itoham Foods received OIO approval to become to sole owner by obtaining the remaining 35% shareholding. Nissui held 16.8% at that point, and Harrison and other managers held 18.2%. Itoham Foods is a subsidiary to Itoham Yonekyu Holdings. Itoham is publicly listed and 39% owned by the Mitsubishi Corporation. Harrison retired from the company after the March 2018 annual general meeting; he had been at the helm of the company for 34 years, first as managing director and then as chairperson.

== Governance ==
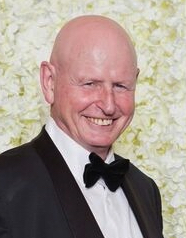
ANZCO founder Graeme Harrison in 2017

Chairperson:

- Eddie Tonks (?–2004)
- Graeme Harrison (2004–2018)
- Kazuhiko (Sam) Misonou (2018–present)

Chief executives:

- Graeme Harrison (1984–2004)
- Mark Clarkson
- Peter Conley (2017–present)

== Land holdings ==
ANZCO Foods feedlot in Wakanui

ANZCO Foods holds land in ten locations in New Zealand.

Land area (ha)	Location	Description
73.8	Eltham, Taranaki	Anzco Foods Eltham meat processing plant (previously known as Riverlands Eltham)
6.9	Waitara, Taranaki	ANZCO Foods Waitara (previously Waitara freezing works) where meat patties for McDonald's (New Zealand and Pacific Islands) are produced
203.9	Bulls, Rangitikei District	ANZCO Foods Manawatu meat works
227.6	Christy's Road, Canterbury	farming
602.8	Seaside Road, Wakanui, Canterbury	Five Star Beef feedlot
361.4	Seafield Road, Canterbury	farming
24.6	Riverlands, Blenheim, Marlborough	Westmeat Blenheim
5.3	Seafield, Canterbury	ANZCO Foods Canterbury (former Fortex Ashburton slaughter plant)
0.5	Green Island, Dunedin, Otago	Manufacturing of burgers
141.5	Kokiri, Westland	ANZCO Foods Kokiri, meat processing plant
