= Shadow Cabinet of David Shearer =

New Zealand shadow cabinet (2011–2013)

David Shearer's first frontbench team was announced in December 2011 following the 2011 New Zealand general election and Shearer's own election to the Labour Party leadership.

== List of shadow ministers ==
Portfolio	Minister	Start	End
Leader	David Shearer	13 December 2011	15 September 2013
Deputy Leader	Grant Robertson	13 December 2011	15 September 2013
Attorney-General	Charles Chauvel	19 December 2011	25 February 2013
Attorney-General	David Parker	25 February 2013	15 September 2013
Commerce	Clayton Cosgrove	19 December 2011	15 September 2013
Conservation	Ruth Dyson	19 December 2011	15 September 2013
Defence	Iain Lees-Galloway	19 December 2011	25 February 2013
Defence	Phil Goff	25 February 2013	15 September 2013
Economic Development	David Cunliffe	19 December 2011	20 November 2012
Economic Development	David Clark	25 February 2013	15 September 2013
Education	Nanaia Mahuta	19 December 2011	25 February 2013
Education	Chris Hipkins	25 February 2013	15 September 2013
Finance	David Parker	19 December 2011	15 September 2013
Foreign Affairs	Phil Goff	19 December 2011	15 September 2013
Health	Maryan Street	19 December 2011	25 February 2013
Health	Annette King	25 February 2013	15 September 2013
Housing	Annette King	19 December 2011	25 February 2013
Housing	Phil Twyford	25 February 2013	15 September 2013
Immigration	Darien Fenton	19 December 2011	15 September 2013
Internal Affairs	Ruth Dyson	19 December 2011	25 February 2013
Internal Affairs	Trevor Mallard	25 February 2013	15 September 2013
Justice	Charles Chauvel	19 December 2011	25 February 2013
Justice	Andrew Little	25 February 2013	15 September 2013
Labour	Darien Fenton	19 December 2011	15 September 2013
Maori Affairs	Parekura Horomia	19 December 2011	29 April 2013
Maori Affairs	Shane Jones	1 June 2013	15 September 2013
Police	Kris Faafoi	19 December 2011	15 September 2013
Primary Industries	Damien O'Connor	19 December 2011	15 September 2013
Revenue	David Clark	19 December 2011	25 February 2013
Revenue	David Cunliffe	25 February 2013	15 September 2013
Social Development	Jacinda Ardern	19 December 2011	15 September 2013
Tourism	Rino Tirikatene	19 December 2011	25 February 2013
Tourism	Andrew Little	25 February 2013	15 September 2013
Trade	Clayton Cosgrove	19 December 2011	15 September 2013
Transport	Phil Twyford	19 December 2011	25 February 2013
Transport	Iain Lees-Galloway	25 February 2013	15 September 2013

== Frontbench teams ==
The list below contains Shearer's spokespeople and their respective roles:

=== First iteration ===
Shearer announced his first lineup on 19 December 2011.

Rank	Shadow Minister	Portfolio
1	David Shearer	Leader of the Opposition; Shadow Minister for the New Zealand Security Intelligence Service; Shadow Minister for Science & Innovation
2	Grant Robertson	Deputy Leader of the Opposition; Shadow Minister for the Environment; Shadow Minister of Tertiary Education, Skills and Training
3	Hon David Parker	Shadow Minister of Finance
4	Jacinda Ardern	Shadow Minister for Social Development
5	Hon David Cunliffe	Shadow Minister of Economic Development
6	Hon Clayton Cosgrove	Shadow Minister for State-Owned Enterprises; Shadow Minister for Commerce; Shadow Minister for Trade Negotiations
7	Hon Shane Jones	Shadow Minister for Regional Development
8	Hon Nanaia Mahuta	Shadow Minister of Education
9	Hon Maryan Street	Shadow Minister of Health; Shadow Minister for Disarmament & Arms Control
10	William Sio	Shadow Minister for Employment; Shadow Minister of Pacific Island Affairs
11	Phil Twyford	Shadow Minister for Transport; Shadow Minister for Auckland Issues
12	Hon Trevor Mallard	Shadow Leader of the House; Shadow Minister for the America's Cup
13	Charles Chauvel	Shadow Minister of Justice; Shadow Minister of Corrections; Shadow Minister for Courts; Shadow Attorney-General
14	Hon Lianne Dalziel	Shadow Minister for Canterbury Earthquake Recovery; Shadow Minister of Civil Defence and Emergency Management; Shadow Minister for EQC; Shadow Minister of Consumer Affairs
15	Chris Hipkins	Senior Whip; Shadow Minister of State Services
16	Hon Phil Goff	Shadow Minister for Foreign Affairs and Trade
17	Hon Annette King	Shadow Minister of Housing; Shadow Minister of Local Government
18	Darien Fenton	Junior Whip; Shadow Minister of Labour; Shadow Minister of Immigration
19	Hon Damien O'Connor	Shadow Minister of Primary Industries; Shadow Minister for Food Safety
20	Clare Curran	Shadow Minister of Broadcasting; Shadow Minister of Communications and Information Technology; Shadow Minister for Open Government; Shadow Minister for Disability Issues
	Hon Ruth Dyson	Shadow Minister of Conservation; Shadow Minister of Internal Affairs; Shadow Minister for Senior Citizens
	Hon Parekura Horomia	Shadow Minister of Maori Affairs; Shadow Minister for Treaty Negotiations
	Sue Moroney	Shadow Minister of Early Childhood Education; Shadow Minister for Women's Affairs
	Moana Mackey	Shadow Minister for Climate Change; Shadow Minister of Energy and Resources
	Iain Lees-Galloway	Shadow Minister of Defence; Shadow Minister of Veteran's Affairs
	Raymond Huo	Shadow Minister of Building and Construction; Shadow Minister of Land Information; Shadow Minister of Statistics
	Rajen Prasad	Shadow Minister of Ethnic Affairs
	Kris Faafoi	Shadow Minister of Police; Shadow Minister of Corrections
	Louisa Wall	Shadow Minister for Sport and Recreation; Shadow Minister for the Community and Voluntary Sector
	David Clark	Shadow Minister of Revenue
	Andrew Little	Shadow Minister of ACC
	Rino Tirikatene	Shadow Minister of Tourism
	Megan Woods	Shadow Minister of Youth Affairs
	Ross Robertson	Shadow Minister for Racing

=== Second iteration ===
Shearer announced a major reshuffle in February 2013. Additional portfolios were adjusted in June 2013 after the death of sitting MP and Maori Affairs spokesperson Parekura Horomia.

Rank	Shadow Minister	Portfolio
1	David Shearer	Leader of the Opposition; Shadow Minister for the Security Intelligence Service; Shadow Minister for Science & Innovation
2	Grant Robertson	Deputy Leader; Shadow Minister on Employment, Skills and Training; Shadow Minister for Arts, Culture & Heritage
3	Hon David Parker	Shadow Minister of Finance; Shadow Attorney-General
4	Jacinda Ardern	Shadow Minister for Social Development; Shadow Minister for Children
5	Hon Clayton Cosgrove	Shadow Minister for State-Owned Enterprises; Shadow Minister for Commerce; Shadow Minister for Trade Negotiations
6	Hon Annette King	Shadow Minister of Health
7	Hon Shane Jones	Shadow Minister for Regional Development; Shadow Minister for Forestry
8	Phil Twyford	Shadow Minister for Housing; Shadow Minister for Auckland Issues
9	Hon Maryan Street	Shadow Minister for the Environment; Shadow Minister for Disarmament & Arms Control
10	Chris Hipkins	Senior Whip; Shadow Minister for Education
11	Hon Nanaia Mahuta	Shadow Minister for Youth Affairs; Shadow Minister on Maori Development
12	David Clark	Shadow Minister of Economic Development; Shadow Minister for Small Business
13	Sue Moroney	Shadow Minister for ACC; Shadow Minister of Early Childhood Education; Shadow Minister for Women's Affairs
14	William Sio	Shadow Minister of Local Government; Shadow Minister of Pacific Island Affairs
15	Hon Phil Goff	Shadow Minister for Foreign Affairs and Trade; Shadow Minister of Defence; Shadow Minister of State Services
16	Darien Fenton	Junior Whip; Shadow Minister of Labour; Shadow Minister of Immigration
17	Hon Damien O'Connor	Shadow Minister of Primary Industries; Shadow Minister for Food Safety
18	Clare Curran	Shadow Minister of Broadcasting; Shadow Minister of Communications and Information Technology; Shadow Minister for Open Government
19	Andrew Little	Shadow Minister of Justice; Shadow Minister of Tourism
20	Megan Woods	Shadow Minister for Tertiary Education
21	Hon Trevor Mallard	Shadow Leader of the House; Shadow Minister of Internal Affairs; Shadow Minister of Sport and Recreation
22	Hon Lianne Dalziel	Shadow Minister for Canterbury Earthquake Recovery; Shadow Minister of Civil Defence and Emergency Management; Shadow Minister for EQC
23	Hon Ruth Dyson	Shadow Minister of Conservation; Shadow Minister of Land Information; Shadow Minister for Senior Citizens; Shadow Minister for Disability Issues
24	Hon David Cunliffe	Shadow Minister of Revenue; Shadow Minister of Fisheries
25	Hon Parekura Horomia	Shadow Minister of Maori Affairs; Shadow Minister for Treaty Negotiations
26	Moana Mackey	Shadow Minister for Climate Change; Shadow Minister of Energy and Resources
27	Iain Lees-Galloway	Shadow Minister of Transport; Shadow Minister of Veteran's Affairs
28	Raymond Huo	Shadow Minister of Building and Construction; Shadow Minister of Statistics
29	Rajen Prasad	Shadow Minister of Ethnic Affairs
30	Kris Faafoi	Shadow Minister of Police; Shadow Minister of Corrections
31	Carol Beaumont	Shadow Minister of Consumer Affairs
32	Louisa Wall	Shadow Minister for the Community and Voluntary Sector
33	Rino Tirikatene	Shadow Minister of Customs
34	Ross Robertson	Shadow Minister for Racing
