= Shadow Cabinet of David Cunliffe =

New Zealand shadow cabinet (2013–2014)

David Cunliffe announced his first frontbench team on 23 September 2013, a week after he was elected Leader of the Labour Party. Following the April 2014 resignation of senior MP Shane Jones, Cunliffe reshuffled his Shadow Ministry on 6 May. Cunliffe ranked his top 25 MPs, with the remainder listed alphabetically. MPs who announced they would not contest the 2014 general election are listed last.

As the Labour Party formed the largest party not in government, this frontbench team was as a result the Official Opposition of the New Zealand House of Representatives.

Rank	Shadow Minister	Portfolio
1	Hon David Cunliffe	Leader of the Opposition; Spokesperson for the Security Intelligence Service; Spokesperson for Regional Development
2	Hon David Parker	Deputy Leader; Spokesperson for Finance; Shadow Attorney-General
3	Grant Robertson	Shadow Leader of the House; Spokesperson for Economic Development; Spokesperson for Employment, Skills, and Training; Associate Spokesperson for the SIS; Associate Spokesperson for Arts, Culture, and Heritage
4	Hon Annette King	Spokesperson for Health
5	Jacinda Ardern	Spokesperson for Children; Spokesperson for Police; Spokesperson for Corrections; Spokesperson for Arts, Culture and Heritage
6	Phil Twyford	Spokesperson for Housing; Spokesperson for Transport; Spokesperson for Auckland Issues; Associate Spokesperson for the Environment (cities)
7	Hon Clayton Cosgrove	Spokesperson for State Owned Enterprises; Spokesperson for Commerce; Spokesperson for the Earthquake Commission; Associate Spokesperson for Finance
8	Hon Nanaia Mahuta	Spokesperson for Maori Affairs; Spokesperson for Treaty of Waitangi Negotiations; Associate Spokesperson for Innovation, Research, and Development
9	Chris Hipkins	Spokesperson for Education; Spokesperson for Early Childhood Education; Spokesperson for Forestry
10	Sue Moroney	Senior Whip; Spokesperson for Social Development
11	Andrew Little	Spokesperson for Justice; Spokesperson for Labour
12	David Shearer	Spokesperson for Foreign Affairs; Spokesperson for Energy and Resources
13	William Sio	Spokesperson for Pacific Island Affairs; Spokesperson for Local Government; Spokesperson on Interfaith Dialogue; Associate Spokesperson for Social Development
14	Hon Phil Goff	Spokesperson for Defence; Spokesperson for Trade; Spokesperson for Ethnic Affairs; Spokesperson for Veterans' Affairs; Associate Spokesperson for Foreign Affairs
15	Hon Trevor Mallard	Spokesperson for Immigration; Spokesperson for Internal Affairs; Spokesperson for Sport and Recreation; Spokesperson on the America's Cup; Spokesperson on Animal Rights; Associate Finance Spokesperson; Associate Spokesperson for Economic Development
16	Hon Maryan Street	Spokesperson for State Services; Spokesperson for Tertiary Education; Spokesperson for Disarmament & Arms Control; Associate Spokesperson for Foreign Affairs (ODA / human rights)
17	Louisa Wall	Spokesperson for Youth Affairs; Spokesperson for the Voluntary & Community Sector; Associate Spokesperson for Social Development; Associate Spokesperson for Sport and Recreation; Associate Spokesperson for Auckland Issues (South Auckland)
18	Moana Mackey	Spokesperson for the Environment; Spokesperson on Climate Change; Spokesperson for Science; Associate Spokesperson for Health
19	Hon Damien O'Connor	Spokesperson for Primary Industries; Spokesperson for Fisheries; Spokesperson for Biosecurity; Spokesperson for Food Safety
20	David Clark	Spokesperson for Revenue; Spokesperson for Small Business; Associate Spokesperson for Finance; Associate Spokesperson for Health
21	Iain Lees-Galloway	Junior Whip; Spokesperson for ACC; Associate Spokesperson for Health
22	Kelvin Davis	Associate Spokesperson for Regional Development; Associate Spokesperson for Education; Associate Spokesperson for Police; Associate Spokesperson for Corrections
23	Carol Beaumont	Assistant Whip; Spokesperson for Women's Affairs; Spokesperson for Consumer Rights & Standards; Associate Spokesperson for Labour
24	Megan Woods	Spokesperson for Innovation, Research, and Development; Associate Spokesperson on Transport; Associate Spokesperson for Education (Christchurch); Associate Spokesperson for Tertiary Education (Christchurch)
25	Kris Faafoi	Spokesperson for Broadcasting; Associate Spokesperson for Pacific Island Affairs; Associate Spokesperson for Communications and IT
