= Gorton's of Gloucester =

Seafood-processing company

Gorton's, Inc.
- Company type: Subsidiary
- Industry: Food processing
- Founded: 1849; 177 years ago (as John Pew & Sons)
- Founders: John Pew; Slade Gorton; William Pew
- Headquarters: Gloucester, Massachusetts, U.S.
- Key people: Kurt Hogan, CEO
- Products: Frozen seafood
- Parent: Nissui
- Website: gortons.com

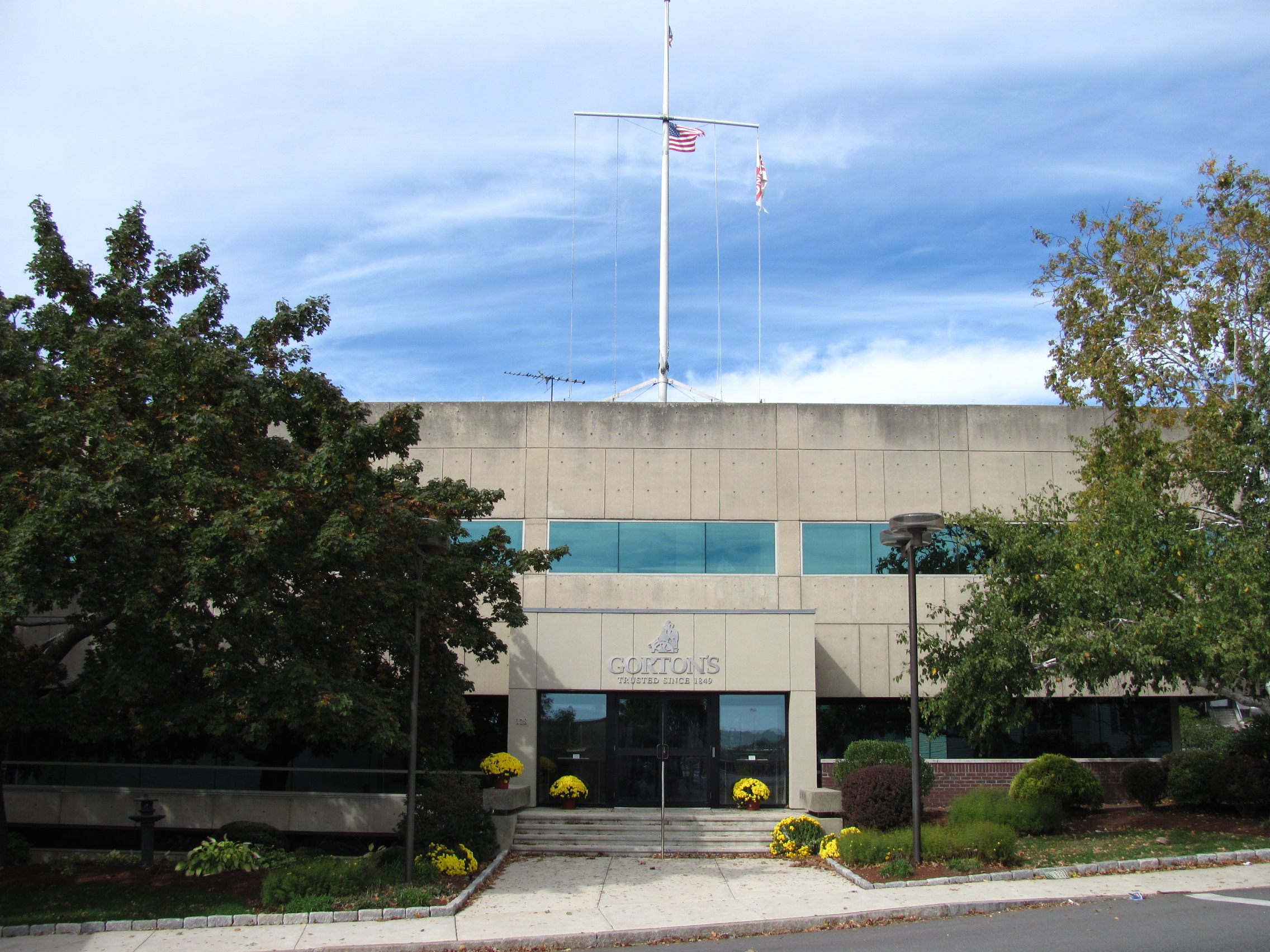
128 Rogers Street Gloucester, Massachusetts

Gorton's of Gloucester is a subsidiary of Japanese seafood conglomerate Nissui, producing fishsticks and other frozen seafood for the retail market in the United States. Gorton's also has a North American food service business which sells to fast-food restaurants such as McDonald's, and an industrial coating ingredients operation. It has been headquartered in Gloucester, Massachusetts, since 1849.

== History ==
The company traces its roots to a fishery called John Pew & Sons. William Pew, son of John Pew, picked up fishing after serving as a Colonial soldier in the French and Indian War. While most people moved West after the war, Pew turned eastward and arrived in Gloucester, Massachusetts, in 1755. The father-and-son fishery business emerged as an official commercial company, John Pew & Sons, in 1849.

When nearby Rockport's chief industry, the Annisquam Cotton Mill, burned down, Slade Gorton, the mill's superintendent, was out of a job. At his wife's urging, he began a fishing business in 1874 which was known as Slade Gorton & Company, and began to pack and sell salt codfish and mackerel in small kegs. This company was the first to package salt-dried fish in barrels. In 1899, the company patented the "Original Gorton Fish Cake". In 1905, the Slade Gorton Company adopted the fisherman at the helm of a schooner (the "Man at the Wheel") as the company trademark. Today, he is known as the Gorton's Fisherman.

In 1906, Slade Gorton & Company, John Pew & Sons, and two other Gloucester fisheries merged into the Gorton-Pew Fisheries. They made Gorton's codfish cakes a household name in New England.

The company went into the fish-freezing business in the early 1930s. In 1949, Gorton-Pew made headlines when it drove the first refrigerator trailer truck shipment of frozen fish from Gloucester to San Francisco—a trip that took eight days. In 1953, the company was the first to introduce a frozen ready-to-cook fish stick, which won the Parents magazine Seal of Approval.

In 1957, Gorton-Pew Fisheries name was changed to Gorton's of Gloucester; in 1965, it became The Gorton Corporation, and it is now known as Gorton's. In 1968, Gorton's merged with General Mills, Inc., as a wholly owned subsidiary.

In May 1995, Unilever bought Gorton's from General Mills. In August 2001, Unilever sold Gorton's and BlueWater Seafoods to Nippon Suisan (USA), Inc., a subsidiary of Nippon Suisan Kaisha, for $175 million in cash.

In early 2005, the Gorton's fisherman was shown in MasterCard's "Icons" commercial during Super Bowl XXXIX, which depicts many food and cleaning advertisement mascots having dinner together.

In late 2005 three environmentalist and animal-rights groups—the Environmental Investigation Agency, the Humane Society of the United States (HSUS) and Greenpeace—began a campaign "calling on Gorton’s to persuade its parent company, Nissui, to permanently bring an end to the hunting of whales" in the Southern Ocean Whale Sanctuary. In 2006, they announced, "our friends at seafood suppliers Gorton's, Sealord and parent company Nissui have withdrawn their active support for Japanese whaling."

Judson Reis was named president and CEO in 2009. He retired effective January 1, 2020, and was succeeded by Kurt Hogan.
