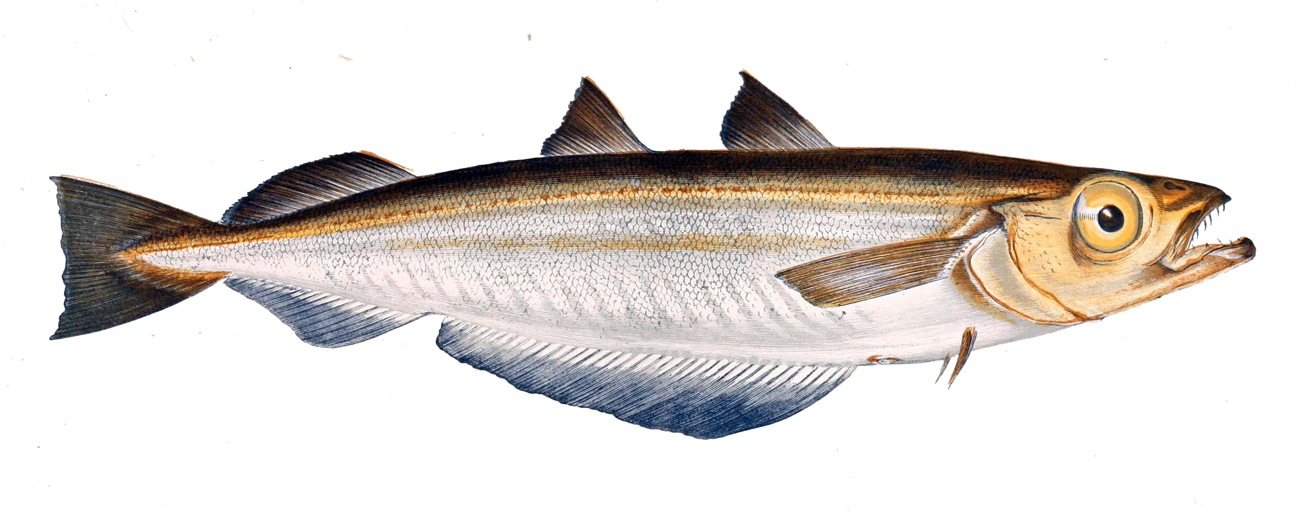

Scientific classification
- Kingdom: Animalia
- Phylum: Chordata
- Class: Actinopterygii
- Order: Gadiformes
- Family: Gadidae
- Genus: Micromesistius
- Species: M. poutassou

Binomial name
- Micromesistius poutassou (A. Risso, 1827)
- Range of blue whiting

Synonyms
- Merlangus poutassou Risso, 1827; Boreogadus poutassou (Risso, 1827); Gadus poutassou (Risso, 1827); Merlangus vernalis Risso, 1827; Merlangus pertusus Cocco, 1829; Merlangus albus Yarrell, 1841; Merlangus communis Costa, 1844; Gadus melanostomus Nilsson, 1855

= Blue whiting =

Species of fish

The blue whiting (Micromesistius poutassou) one of the two species in the genus Micromesistius in the order of Gadiformes, which also contains cod, haddock, whiting, and pollock. It is common in the northeast Atlantic Ocean from Morocco to Iceland and Spitsbergen. It also occurs in the northern parts of the Mediterranean, where it may be locally abundant. Blue whiting also occur in the northwest Atlantic Ocean between Canada and Greenland, but is considered rare. It has a long, narrow body and a silvery underbody. The fish can attain a length of more than 40 cm. The average length of blue whiting caught off the west shores of the UK is 31 cm.

A related species, southern blue whiting, Micromesistius australis, occurs in the Southern Hemisphere.

== Fisheries ==
Exploitation of blue whiting only started in the 1970s. The species, in the last decades, has become increasingly important to the fishing industries of northern European countries, including Russia. Catches exceeded 1 million tonnes from 1998 to 2008. According to the Food and Agriculture Organization of the United Nations, blue whiting was fifth most important capture fish species in 2006. However, recruitment of the stock fell to a low level in 2006 and has been weak ever since, causing declining spawning stock and eventually triggering strong reductions in catch quotas. The reasons for low recruitment in recent years are poorly known. The total quota for 2011 was set to 40,100 tonnes, which is less than 2% of the record catch of 2.4 million tonnes in 2004. Catches in 2011 exceeded the quota by more than 100%.

For 2012, ICES advised the catches should be no more than 391,000 tonnes (385,000 long tons; 431,000 short tons). This large increase relative to the quota in 2011 (but not to the catches in 1998–2008) is caused by a revision in the stock assessment; however, recruitment to the stock is still low and the stock is forecasted to decline. The coastal states set the total quota for 2012 to 391,000 tonnes.

The fish is usually not marketed fresh, but processed into fish meal and oil. However, in Russia, southern Europe, and Japan, blue whiting are sometimes sold as food fish.

Global capture production of Blue whiting (Micromesistius poutassou) in million tonnes from 1950 to 2022, as reported by the FAO

== Management ==
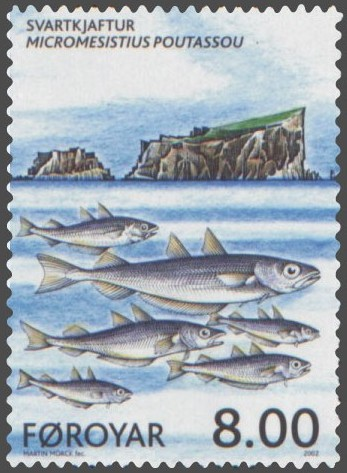
Blue whiting on a Faroese stamp

Blue whiting in the northeast Atlantic is a straddling stock: it occupies the exclusive economic zone (EEZ) of the Faroe Islands, the European Union, Iceland and Norway, as well as the high seas". This means effective regulation calls for international co-operation.

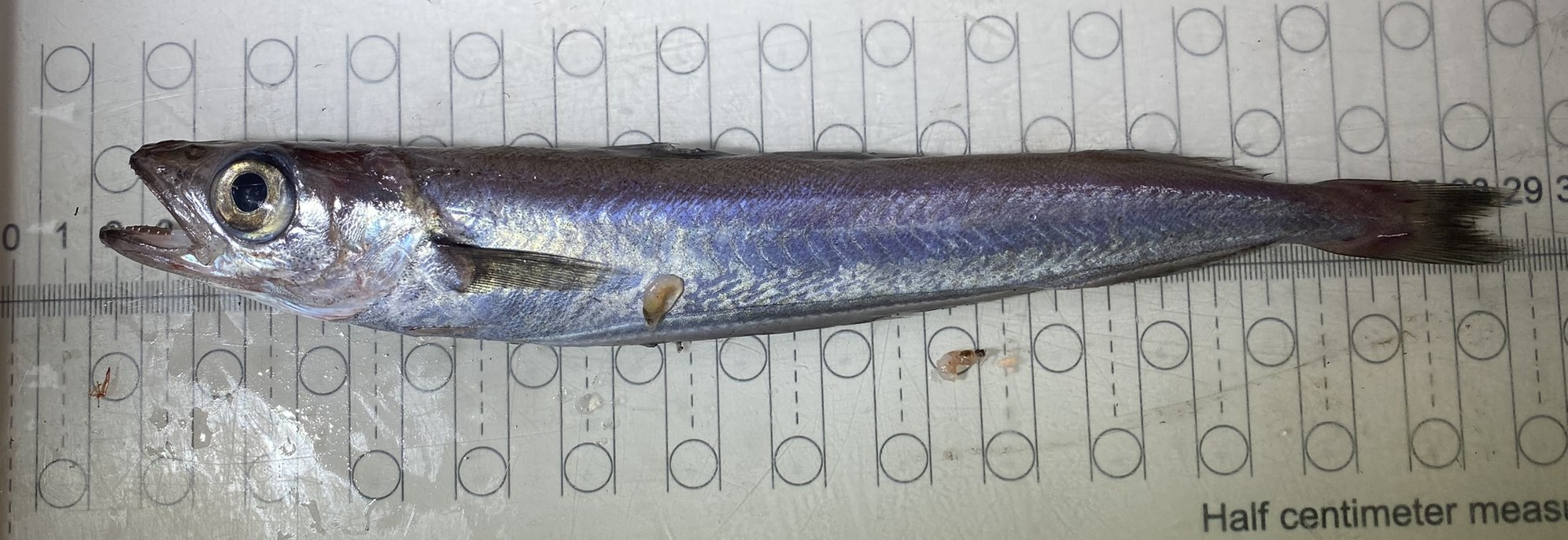
A photo of a freshly caught blue whiting.

Quota advice for blue whiting in the northeast Atlantic is provided by ICES. For a long period, blue whiting fisheries were mainly regulated through nationally set quotas because there was no international agreement about sharing the total quota; consequently, the total catch greatly exceeded the advised quotas However, the Coastal States (the Faroe Islands, the European Union, Iceland and Norway) reached an agreement in December 2005, ending the period of what was sometimes referred to as "Olympic fishing". Since 2006, the blue whiting fishery has been regulated under this agreement, which gives the greatest share to the European Union, but through quota swaps, Norway has been holding the largest annual quotas.

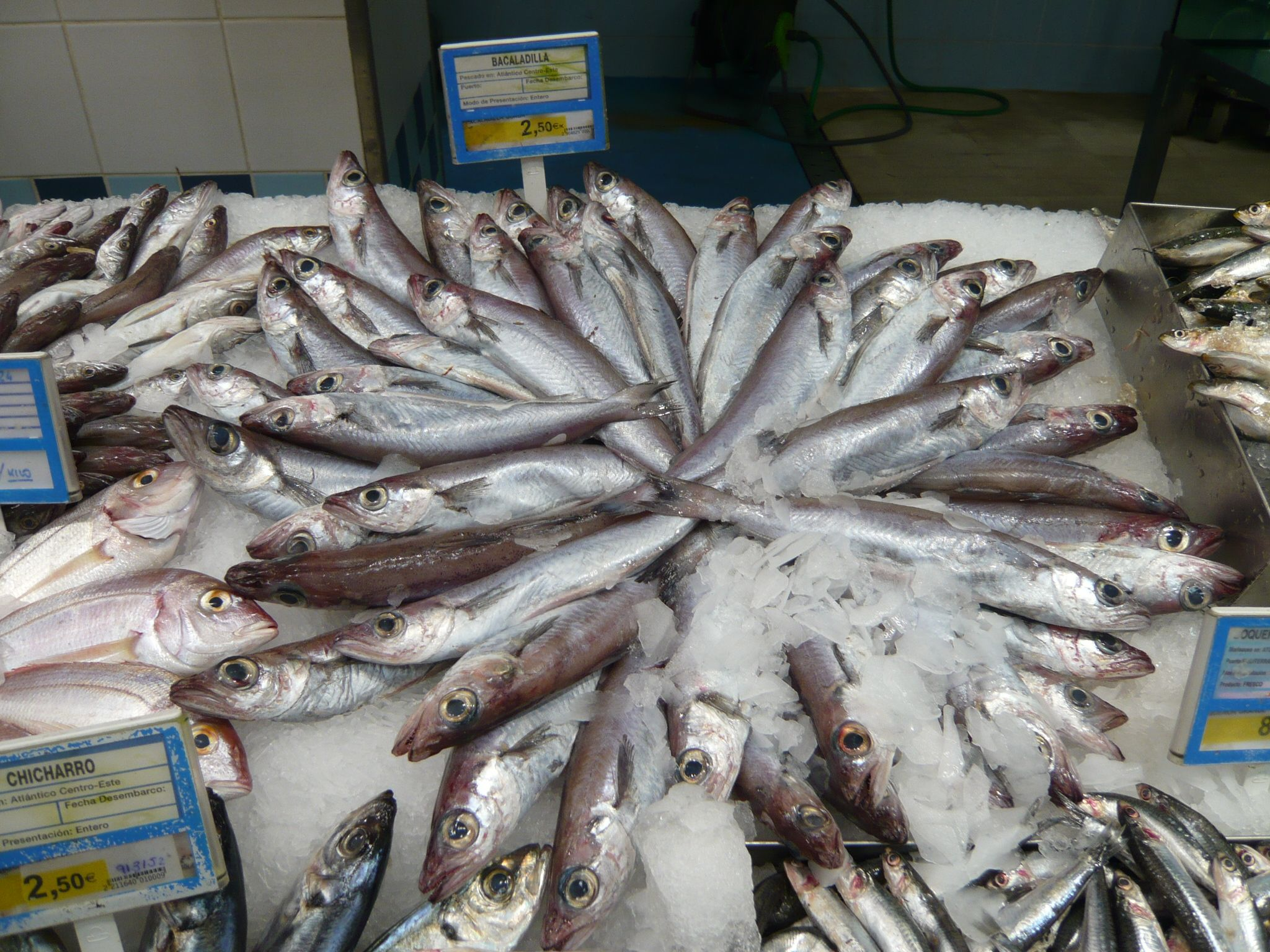
Blue whiting sold for human consumption in Spain
