= Winchmore =

Locality in the Canterbury Region of New Zealand

Winchmore Porowhita (Māori)
- Locality
- Interactive map of Winchmore
- Coordinates: 43°49′48″S 171°43′01″E
- Country: New Zealand
- Region: Canterbury
- District: Ashburton District
- Ward: Western
- Electorates: Rangitata; Te Tai Tonga (Māori)

Government
  - Territorial authority: Ashburton District Council
  - Regional council: Environment Canterbury
  - Mayor of Ashburton: Liz McMillan
  - Rangitata MP: James Meager
  - Te Tai Tonga MP: Tākuta Ferris

Area
  - Territorial: 62.50 km^{2} (24.13 sq mi)

Population (2023 census)
  - Territorial: 342
  - Density: 5.47/km^{2} (14.2/sq mi)
- Time zone: UTC+12 (NZST)
  - Summer (DST): UTC+13 (NZDT)
- Postcode(s): 7776
- Area code: 03
- Local iwi: Ngāi Tahu

Winchmore is a locality in the Ashburton District, situated on the Canterbury Plains in the South Island of New Zealand.

Winchmore lies roughly 10 kilometres (6.2 mi) northwest of Ashburton, the largest town in the district, and 20 kilometres (12 mi) south of Methven. It is a farming area on State Highway 77, neighbouring Greenstreet, Mitcham, and Lauriston. It consists mostly of private farmland.

Winchmore is the location of the Winchmore Gardens, a large garden that has existed since 1853, when it was established as part of Winchmore Station by George Hart. While Hart's original 8,000-hectare (20,000-acre) claim on the Ashburton River's north bank no longer remains, the gardens are still maintained. They are currently 1.8 hectares (4.4 acres) in area, and contain oaks, wellingtonia, sycamore, cherry, willow, and poplar trees that were planted in the 19th century.

Winchmore has a community hall and a research weather station. Its primary school closed in 1927.

== Demographics ==
Winchmore locality covers 62.50 km^{2} (24.13 sq mi). It is part of the Winchmore-Wakanui statistical area.

Historical population
Year	Pop.	±% p.a.
2006	261	—
2013	327	+3.27%
2018	354	+1.60%
2023	342	−0.69%

Winchmore had a population of 342 in the 2023 New Zealand census, a decrease of 12 people (−3.4%) since the 2018 census, and an increase of 15 people (4.6%) since the 2013 census. There were 183 males and 156 females in 132 dwellings. 0.9% of people identified as LGBTIQ+. There were 75 people (21.9%) aged under 15 years, 54 (15.8%) aged 15 to 29, 165 (48.2%) aged 30 to 64, and 45 (13.2%) aged 65 or older.

People could identify as more than one ethnicity. The results were 84.2% European (Pākehā); 2.6% Māori; 11.4% Asian; 0.9% Middle Eastern, Latin American and African New Zealanders (MELAA); and 1.8% other, which includes people giving their ethnicity as "New Zealander". English was spoken by 96.5%, and other languages by 13.2%. No language could be spoken by 1.8% (e.g. too young to talk). The percentage of people born overseas was 21.1, compared with 28.8% nationally.

Religious affiliations were 36.8% Christian, 2.6% Hindu, and 0.9% other religions. People who answered that they had no religion were 49.1%, and 9.6% of people did not answer the census question.

Of those at least 15 years old, 57 (21.3%) people had a bachelor's or higher degree, 147 (55.1%) had a post-high school certificate or diploma, and 45 (16.9%) people exclusively held high school qualifications. 42 people (15.7%) earned over $100,000 compared to 12.1% nationally. The employment status of those at least 15 was 165 (61.8%) full-time, 36 (13.5%) part-time, and 6 (2.2%) unemployed.

== Climate ==
Climate data for Winchmore (1991–2020 normals, extremes 1949–present)
Month	Jan	Feb	Mar	Apr	May	Jun	Jul	Aug	Sep	Oct	Nov	Dec	Year
Record high °C (°F)	35.9 (96.6)	38.5 (101.3)	33.5 (92.3)	28.1 (82.6)	26.9 (80.4)	22.1 (71.8)	22.0 (71.6)	23.6 (74.5)	27.4 (81.3)	28.5 (83.3)	31.6 (88.9)	32.9 (91.2)	38.5 (101.3)
Mean daily maximum °C (°F)	22.2 (72.0)	22.1 (71.8)	20.1 (68.2)	17.1 (62.8)	14.4 (57.9)	11.5 (52.7)	11.0 (51.8)	12.5 (54.5)	14.8 (58.6)	16.7 (62.1)	18.5 (65.3)	20.7 (69.3)	16.8 (62.2)
Daily mean °C (°F)	16.4 (61.5)	16.3 (61.3)	14.3 (57.7)	11.5 (52.7)	9.0 (48.2)	6.3 (43.3)	5.7 (42.3)	7.2 (45.0)	9.2 (48.6)	11.0 (51.8)	12.7 (54.9)	14.9 (58.8)	11.2 (52.2)
Mean daily minimum °C (°F)	10.5 (50.9)	10.4 (50.7)	8.6 (47.5)	6.0 (42.8)	3.5 (38.3)	1.1 (34.0)	0.4 (32.7)	1.9 (35.4)	3.6 (38.5)	5.3 (41.5)	6.8 (44.2)	9.2 (48.6)	5.6 (42.1)
Record low °C (°F)	0.2 (32.4)	1.6 (34.9)	−1.8 (28.8)	−3.1 (26.4)	−8.4 (16.9)	−7.8 (18.0)	−7.7 (18.1)	−7.2 (19.0)	−6.2 (20.8)	−4.2 (24.4)	−2.1 (28.2)	0.4 (32.7)	−8.4 (16.9)
Average rainfall mm (inches)	58.6 (2.31)	56.2 (2.21)	58.1 (2.29)	70.5 (2.78)	61.5 (2.42)	67.9 (2.67)	63.8 (2.51)	58.8 (2.31)	51.5 (2.03)	57.9 (2.28)	60.6 (2.39)	62.6 (2.46)	728 (28.66)
Source: NIWA
