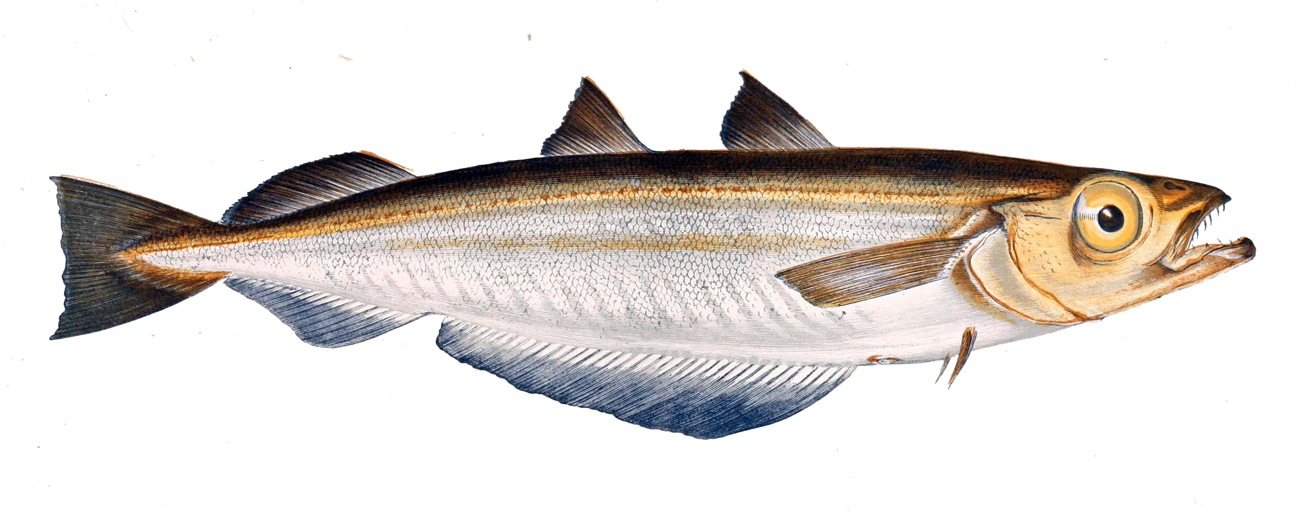
- Micromesistius poutassou

Scientific classification
- Domain: Eukaryota
- Kingdom: Animalia
- Phylum: Chordata
- Class: Actinopterygii
- Order: Gadiformes
- Family: Gadidae
- Genus: Micromesistius; T. N. Gill, 1863

Type species
- Merlangus poutassou Risso, 1827

= Micromesistius =

Genus of fishes

Micromesistius, the blue whitings, is a genus of cods.

== Species ==
The two currently recognized species in this genus are:

- Micromesistius australis Norman, 1937 (southern blue whiting)
- Micromesistius poutassou (A. Risso, 1827) (blue whiting)
