= Umios =

Japanese seafood company

Umios Corporation

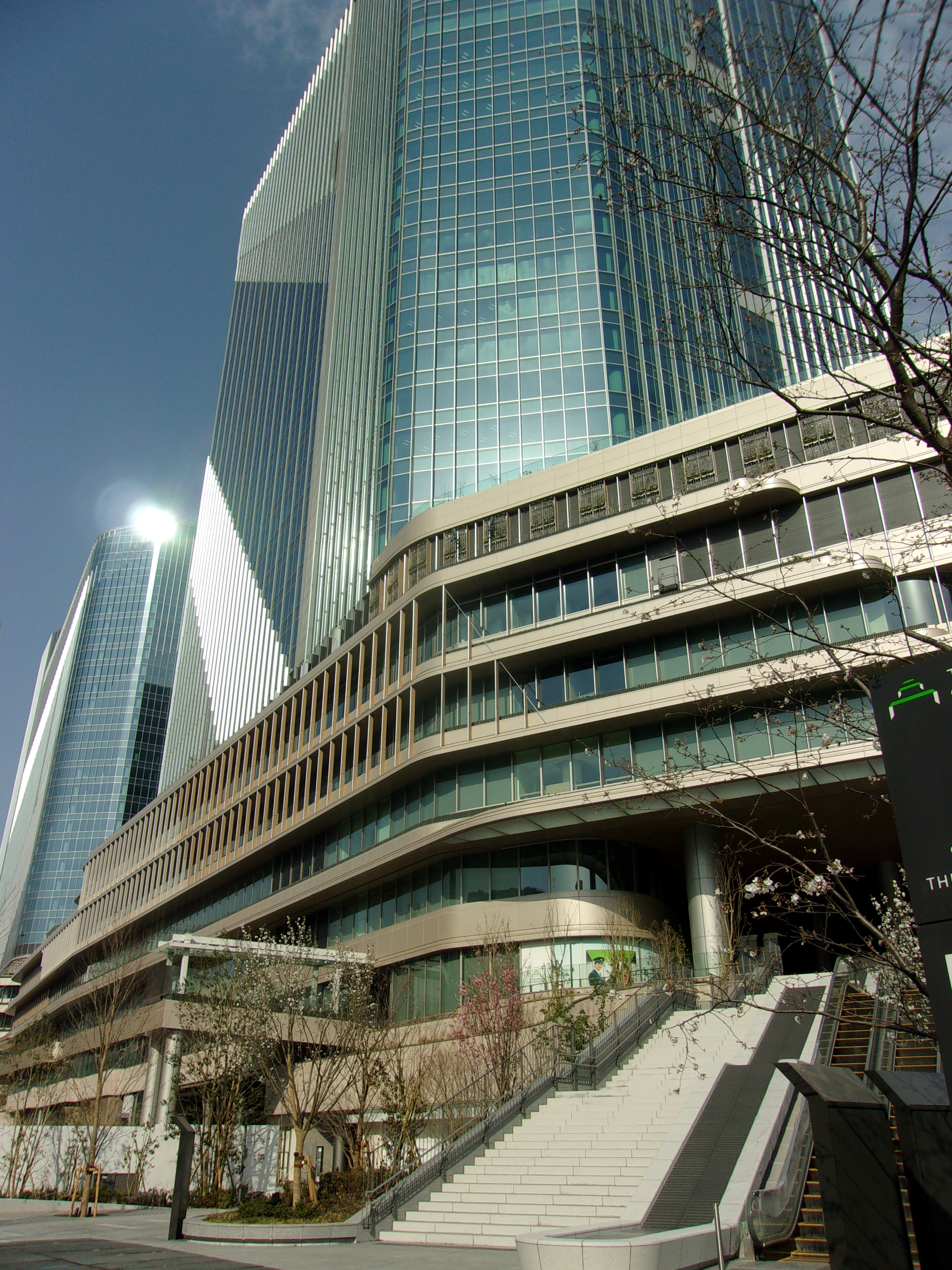
- Formerly: Nishi Taiyo Gyogyo Tosei K.K. (1943–1945); Taiyo Fishery Co., Ltd. (1945–1993); Maruha Corporation (1993–2004); Maruha Group Inc. (2004–2007); Maruha Nichiro Holdings Inc. (2007–2014); Maruha Nichiro Corporation (2014–2026)
- Type: Public KK
- Traded as: TYO: 1333
- Industry: Fishing; Food processing
- Founded: March 31, 1943
- Headquarters: THE LINKPILLAR 1 SOUTH, 21-2 2-chome, Takanawa, Minato, Tokyo, Japan
- Key people: Masaru Ikemi, (CEO and President)
- Products: Seafood; Frozen food; Fine chemicals; Canned food; Meat products
- Revenue: ▲$ 8.614 billion (FY 2012) (¥ 809.789 billion) (FY 2012)
- Net income: ▲$ 58 million (FY 2012) (¥ 5.448 billion) (FY 2012)
- Owner: Nakabe family through Daitoh Trading Co. (10.19%)
- Number of employees: 12,335 (consolidated) (as of December 2013)
- Website: www.umios.com/en/

Umios Corporation (ウミオス株式会社, Umios Kabushiki-gaisha) is a Japanese seafood company, beginning its operation in 1880, when its founder, Ikujiro Nakabe, began a fish sale business in Osaka. The company is the largest of its kind in Japan, with Nippon Suisan Kaisha and Kyokuyo Co., Ltd. as its main competitors.

Group Slogan is "Bringing Delicious Delight to the World."

Umios has subsidiaries in Japan, New Zealand, Australia, the United States, across Europe, Asia and South America.

On March 1, 2026, Maruha Nichiro rebranded to Umios.

== History ==
- 1880 - The founder, Ikujiro Nakabe, begins purchasing fish from fishermen for sale to wholesalers at the wholesale fish market in Osaka.
- 1904 - Operation base moved to Shimonoseki in Yamaguchi Prefecture. Begins purse seine fishing with early power boats.
- 1924 - Incorporated as K.K. Hayashikane Shoten, ending the era of private operation. Fishing operations expanded to include steam trawling, danish and purse seining, and fishing with traps.
- 1929 - Enyo Whaling Co. Ltd incorporated by Nakabe for shorebased whaling.
- 1936 - Taiyo Whaling Co. Ltd incorporated by Nakabe for whaling in the Antarctic. Operated two 20,000 ton factory ships and 19 whale catchers.
- 1943 - Hayashikane Shoten, Enyo Whaling, and Taiyo Whaling consolidated into one corporation. Corporate name changed to Nishi Taiyo Gyogyo Tosei K.K.
- 1945 - Corporate name changed to Taiyo Gyogyo K.K. (Taiyo Fishery Co., Ltd.) (virtually all overseas assets and operations lost at the end of World War II)
- 1949 - Corporate headquarters moved to Tokyo

Taiyo professional baseball club (present-day Yokohama DeNA BayStars) established

- 1951 - Overseas operations started
- 1960 - Operations expanded from the marine products business into feeds and livestock production
- 1978 - New headquarters building completed in central Tokyo
- 1993 - New trademark adopted and corporate name changed to Maruha Corporation (Maruha Kabushiki Kaisha)
- 1996 - Acquisition of Taiyo Seafoods Co., Ltd.
- 2002 - Sold Yokohama BayStars to Tokyo Broadcasting System
- 2004 - Maruha Group Inc. established as a holding company
- 2007 - Economic union of Maruha Group Inc. and Nichiro Corporation merged into Maruha Nichiro Holdings, Inc.
- 2014 - Reorganization of the company structure and adoption of the Maruha Nichiro Corporation name and listing of the company's stock on the Tokyo Stock Exchange.
- 2022 - Removed from Nikkei 225
- 2026 - Changed its name to Umios Corporation (Umios Kabushiki Kaisha)

== See also ==
- Fishing industry in Japan
