= Wakanui =

- Rural locality
- Interactive map of Wakanui
- Coordinates: 43°58′23″S 171°49′26″E
- Country: New Zealand
- Region: Canterbury
- Territorial authority: Ashburton District
- Ward: Eastern
- Electorates: Rangitata; Te Tai Tonga (Māori)

Government
  - Territorial authority: Ashburton District Council
  - Regional council: Environment Canterbury
  - Mayor of Ashburton: Liz McMillan
  - Rangitata MP: James Meager
  - Te Tai Tonga MP: Tākuta Ferris

Area
  - Total: 121.22 km^{2} (46.80 sq mi)

Population (2023 census)
  - Total: 336
  - Density: 2.77/km^{2} (7.18/sq mi)

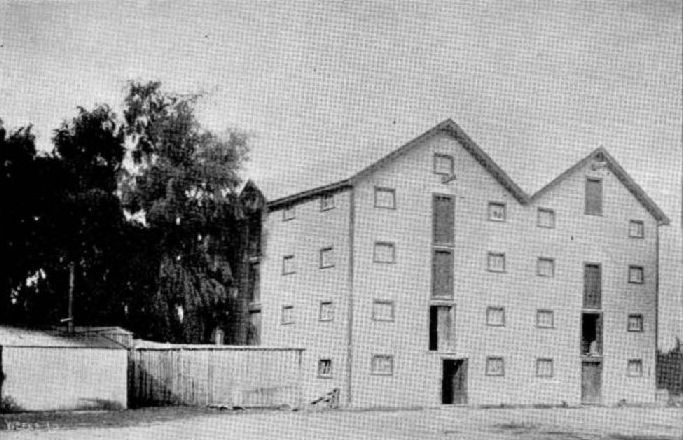
Wakanui flour mill in circa 1900

Wakanui is a locality in the Ashburton District, New Zealand. The area is rural and close to the sea. Historically it is known as a grain-producing area. It holds New Zealand's largest feedlot, where Wakanui Beef is produced through intensive farming.

== History ==
The European history of the area started with runs 139, 140, and 150 being taken up in 1854 and 1855. Wakanui is located between Ashburton and the sea, and east of the Ashburton River / Hakatere. An early owner (probably not the initial owners) was the Kermode and Moore partnership, with George Henry Moore as manager.

When Kermode and Moore sold their holdings, the land was subdivided (this process finished by 1877) and more people moved into the area. Around that time, an extensive irrigation system was implemented, which was extended across all of Ashburton County, and that opened the dry but fertile land for wheat growing. Some 3,000 miles (4,800 km) of irrigation races were built throughout the county.

An electoral redistribution was carried out just prior to the 1881 election and the Wakanui electorate was formed (by splitting off areas from the Coleridge and Selwyn electorates). The Wakanui electorate was in existence for two electoral cycles and was dis-established in 1887.

In 1879, a large flour mill was erected in Wakanui. The five-storey building was a landmark for the rural location. In 1906, the mill building was hauled over 6 miles (9.7 km) to Ashburton. It was deemed advisable that none of the machinery be removed and in all the building weighed an estimated 260 metric tons (260 long tons; 290 short tons). The building survived the relocation without damage.

== Demographics ==
Wakanui locality covers 121.22 km^{2} (46.80 sq mi). It is part of the Winchmore-Wakanui statistical area.

Historical population for Wakanui locality
Year	Pop.	±% p.a.
2006	264	—
2013	312	+2.42%
2018	372	+3.58%
2023	336	−2.02%

Wakanui had a population of 336 in the 2023 New Zealand census, a decrease of 36 people (−9.7%) since the 2018 census, and an increase of 24 people (7.7%) since the 2013 census. There were 171 males and 165 females in 111 dwellings. 0.9% of people identified as LGBTIQ+. There were 87 people (25.9%) aged under 15 years, 54 (16.1%) aged 15 to 29, 144 (42.9%) aged 30 to 64, and 51 (15.2%) aged 65 or older.

People could identify as more than one ethnicity. The results were 83.0% European (Pākehā); 8.9% Māori; 1.8% Pasifika; 7.1% Asian; 3.6% Middle Eastern, Latin American and African New Zealanders (MELAA); and 1.8% other, which includes people giving their ethnicity as "New Zealander". English was spoken by 95.5%, Māori by 0.9%, and other languages by 12.5%. No language could be spoken by 1.8% (e.g. too young to talk). The percentage of people born overseas was 19.6, compared with 28.8% nationally.

Religious affiliations were 43.8% Christian, and 3.6% other religions. People who answered that they had no religion were 43.8%, and 7.1% of people did not answer the census question.

Of those at least 15 years old, 39 (15.7%) people had a bachelor's or higher degree, 144 (57.8%) had a post-high school certificate or diploma, and 72 (28.9%) people exclusively held high school qualifications. 27 people (10.8%) earned over $100,000 compared to 12.1% nationally. The employment status of those at least 15 was 141 (56.6%) full-time, 42 (16.9%) part-time, and 6 (2.4%) unemployed.

=== Winchmore-Wakanui statistical area ===
The Winchmore-Wakanui statistical area, which also includes Winchmore, surrounds Ashburton to the north, east and southeast, and covers 310.37 km^{2} (119.83 sq mi). It had an estimated population of 1,500 as of June 2025, with a population density of 4.8 people per km^{2}.

Historical population fo the statistical area
Year	Pop.	±% p.a.
2006	1,284	—
2013	1,344	+0.65%
2018	1,467	+1.77%
2023	1,398	−0.96%
The 2006 population is for a larger area of 312.07 km^{2}. Source:

Winchmore-Wakanui had a population of 1,398 in the 2023 New Zealand census, a decrease of 69 people (−4.7%) since the 2018 census, and an increase of 54 people (4.0%) since the 2013 census. There were 738 males and 660 females in 561 dwellings. 1.5% of people identified as LGBTIQ+. The median age was 40.6 years (compared with 38.1 years nationally). There were 288 people (20.6%) aged under 15 years, 207 (14.8%) aged 15 to 29, 660 (47.2%) aged 30 to 64, and 249 (17.8%) aged 65 or older.

People could identify as more than one ethnicity. The results were 84.8% European (Pākehā); 5.8% Māori; 1.5% Pasifika; 9.7% Asian; 1.3% Middle Eastern, Latin American and African New Zealanders (MELAA); and 2.6% other, which includes people giving their ethnicity as "New Zealander". English was spoken by 97.0%, Māori by 0.6%, Samoan by 0.2%, and other languages by 10.9%. No language could be spoken by 1.9% (e.g. too young to talk). New Zealand Sign Language was known by 0.2%. The percentage of people born overseas was 21.7, compared with 28.8% nationally.

Religious affiliations were 39.3% Christian, 1.3% Hindu, 0.2% Islam, 0.2% Māori religious beliefs, 1.1% Buddhist, 0.2% New Age, and 1.5% other religions. People who answered that they had no religion were 48.7%, and 7.7% of people did not answer the census question.

Of those at least 15 years old, 198 (17.8%) people had a bachelor's or higher degree, 648 (58.4%) had a post-high school certificate or diploma, and 270 (24.3%) people exclusively held high school qualifications. The median income was $49,900, compared with $41,500 nationally. 135 people (12.2%) earned over $100,000 compared to 12.1% nationally. The employment status of those at least 15 was 618 (55.7%) full-time, 180 (16.2%) part-time, and 21 (1.9%) unemployed.

== Wakanui Beef ==
ANZCO Foods feedlot in Wakanui

These days, the name Wakanui is known best for New Zealand's largest feedlot. Owned by ANZCO Foods, beef is produced here; the meat is sold under the brand name Wakanui Beef. The feedlot is consented for 19,000 cattle and it held 14,000 in 2018.

While the feedlot has been in operation since 1991, it only became widely known when animal rights group SAFE published drone footage of it in 2018 and called for feedlots to be banned. Damien O'Connor, as Minister of Agriculture, weighed in on the debate in support of the feedlot. He called it "innovative" and said it was, in general, "very well managed"; he added, "the image of pastoral farming is the one New Zealand promotes and it is the mainstay of our industry".

Grassroots Campaigns Aotearoa took a video of the feedlot in July 2026 which appeared to show a worker striking a steer which was struggling to get up. The company says this "follows established animal welfare procedures".

== Wakanui School ==
Wakanui School opened in 1876 with an initial roll of 35 pupils. In the early decades, the roll peaked in 1890 but at the fiftieth jubilee, the roll was back where it started as more schools had opened throughout the county. A full primary school (i.e. serving years 1 to 8), it had 94 students as of July 2026.
