= Nissui =

Marine products company based in Tokyo, Japan

Nissui Corporation

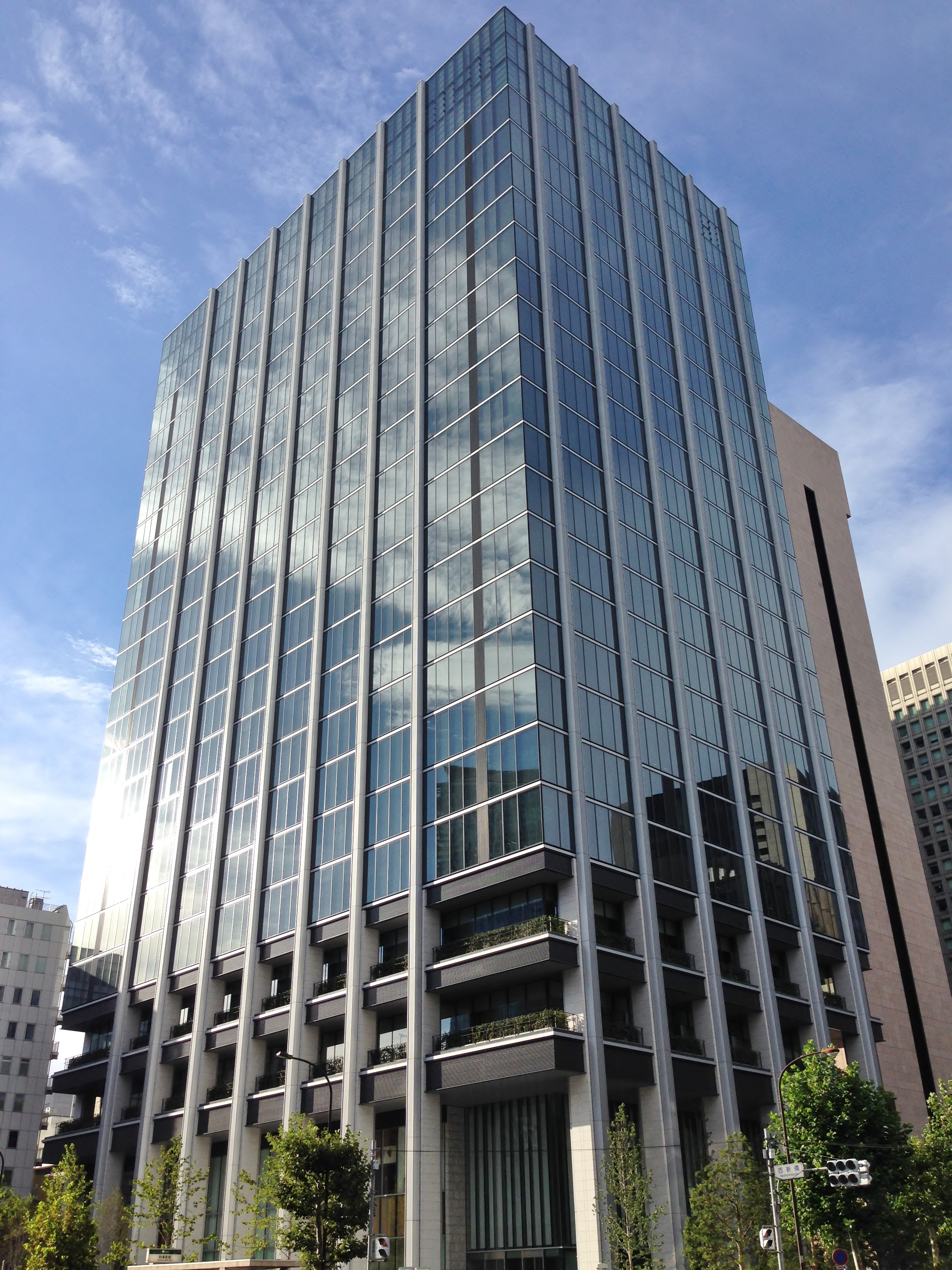
- Nissui's headquarters in Nishi-Shinbashi, Minato, Tokyo
- Formerly: Nippon Suisan Kaisha Ltd. (1917-2022)
- Type: Public KK
- Traded as: TYO: 1332; Nikkei 225 Component
- Industry: Fishing; Food Processing; Whaling (former)
- Founded: Shimonoseki, Yamaguchi, Japan (1911; 115 years ago)
- Founder: Ichiro Tamura
- Headquarters: Nishi-Shimbashi Square, 1-3-1, Nishi-Shimbashi, Minato-ku, Tokyo 105-8676, Japan
- Area served: Worldwide
- Key people: Shingo Hamada, (CEO and President)
- Products: Seafood; Frozen Food; Gorton's of Gloucester; Fine chemicals
- Revenue: ▲¥ 768.1 billion (FY 2022)
- Net income: ▲¥ 27.78 billion (FY 2022)
- Number of employees: 10,175 (consolidated) (as of March 31, 2013)
- Website: Official website

Nissui Corporation (株式会社ニッスイ, Kabushiki-gaisha Nissui), is a marine products company based in Tokyo, Japan. Formerly known as Nippon Suisan Kaisha Ltd. (日本水産株式会社, Nippon Suisan Kabushiki-gaisha) from 31 March 1937 to 30 November 2022, it officially changed its name to its common abbreviation on 1 December 2022.

The company was established as the fishery division of Tamura Steamship Company in March 1911 by Ichiro Tamura (田村市郎), a cousin of the head of the Fujita Zaibatsu (zaibatsu were large conglomerates in pre-war Japan). Its former headquarters, built in Tobata (Kita Kyushu) in 1929, is now an exhibit center.

It has been listed on the Tokyo Exchange since 16 May 1949, when Japan's stock market was resumed after the Second World War (TYO: 1332). It is the only component of the Nikkei 225 index from the country's fishery sector.

With 768 billion yen annual sales in FY2022, it is now the second largest commercial fishing and marine product procurement corporation in the country by revenue, only surpassed by the Maruha Nichiro Holdings. Its founding principles state 'A tap water supply system is exactly what marine products should be like in their production and distribution'.

In 2005, the company divested its whaling fleet following controversy for its role in the modern global whaling industry (see Whaling in Japan).

As of 2013, the company has 61 subsidiaries and 44 associated companies across Japan, Australia, New Zealand, Asia, Europe and North and South America.

== Overview ==
In FY2022, Nissui had 9515 employees and a total net asset of 220.6 billion Yen. As of 10 February 2023, its market capitalisation is 283 billion Yen. Nissui's CEO is Shogo Hamada, who has a degree of fisheries science from the University of Tokyo and has been working for the company since 1983.

After exclusive economic zones (EEZ) were introduced by the 1982 United Nations Convention on the Law of the Sea, Nissui's traditional business model of pelagic fisheries collapsed, as most of continental shelves, where Nissui's ships used to fish, was now to be controlled by other countries. No longer running a profitable business, Nissui found itself unable to allocate any of its profit to dividends for the first time in its history as a publicly traded company in 1991.

This business downturn became an impetus for the company to change its business model, and during the 1990s it invested heavily in aquaculture of salmon by its Chilean subsidiary Emdepes, extraction of Eicosapentaenoic acid from fish for pharmaceutical use, and production of frozen food. It also started to diversify the sources of fish supply by establishing and acquiring subsidiaries around the world.

These efforts gradually proved successful, and its main sources of revenue are now its traditional fishery&marine products business, and the fine chemical and processed food divisions. Today, its subsidiaries across the world not only contribute to the stabilisation of Nissui's supply chain as originally intended but also sell products that cater to the needs of each country. Its US subsidiary Gorton's of Gloucester is the top supplier of frozen marine products, and supplies hamburgers to McDonald's. Its New Zealand subsidiary Sealord is the largest supplier of fried fish and one of the largest food companies in the country. Its French subsidiary Cité Marine holds a similar position in the French frozen food market.

Nissui has been working to make land-based aquaculture commercially viable. Nissui's current aquaculture business, mainly salmon and Japanese amberjack, is mostly conducted in the traditional way of ocean-based aquaculture, meaning they keep fish in segregated areas of harbours or in tanks that are connected to ocean. However, keeping fish in ocean water means they are prone to get diseases or affected by natural conditions, which sometimes result in worst scenarios such as annihilation. This method also has a large impact on the ecosystem that share the water. Thus, from both the perspectives of business stability and environmental friendliness, land-based aquaculture is more desirable. In April 2023, as Nissui's first land-based commercial aquaculture project, a whiteleg shrimp farm started operations in Ei, Kagoshima. A mackerel farm is also planned to start commercial operations in 2026.

== History ==
- 1908 – Founder Ichiro Tamura constructed Daiichi-Maru (199 gross tons), the first steel-frame trawler in Japan
- 1911 – Ichiro Tamura established the Tamura Steamship Fishery Division in Shimonoseki, Yamaguchi Prefecture, and started trawling in cooperation with Kosuke Kunishi and other people (foundation of Nippon Suisan)
- 1920 – Hayatomo Fishery Research Group, the first private fishery research organization in Japan, was established
- 1929 – The base of fishery moved from Shimonoseki to Tobata, Fukuoka Prefecture
- 1934 – First whaling expedition conducted in the Antarctic Ocean
- 1937 – Company name changed to Nippon Suisan
- 1946 – First postwar whaling expedition conducted in the Antarctic Ocean with permission of the General Headquarters (GHQ)
- 1949 – Nippon Suisan listed its shares on the Tokyo Stock Exchange
- 1952 – North Sea fisheries reopened and NISSUI's mother ship-type salmon and trout fleet began fishing.
- 1966 – Head office moved to the present address (Nippon Building in Chiyoda-ku, Tokyo)
- 1974 – Unisea founded in the U.S
- 1978 – EMDEPES founded in Santiago, Chile, as a fishery base
- 1988 – NISSUI acquired Salmones Antartica, a salmon and trout aquaculture company in Chile
- 1990 – NISSUI obtained approval to make "EPA-E NISSUI," a drug substance
- 1995 – involved in financing a management-buyout of ANZCO Foods (just over 25% shareholding; minor partner to Itoham Foods), a meat producer in New Zealand
- 2001 – Acquired 50% of shares of Sealord, a fishery company in New Zealand

Acquired from Unilever Gorton's and Blue Water, pre-cooked frozen seafood brands for household use in North America

- 2002 – Acquired 25% of shares of Alaska Ocean Seafood
- 2004 – Founded NAL Peru, a procurement company specializing in fish meat and fish oil, in Lima, Peru

Founded Europacifico, a marketer of marine products, in Vigo, Spain

- 2005 – Acquired King & Prince Seafood, a U.S. company of pre-cooked frozen seafood for business use
- 2006 – Acquired three marketers of marine products: Nordic Seafood in Denmark, F.W. Bryce in the U.S. and Nordsee in Brazil
- 2007 – Acquired shares of Cité Marine S.A.S., a processed seafood company in France

DOSA was established in Chile in order to administrating, marketing, and distributing for group fishery companies in Chile

- 2008 – Qingdao Nissui Food Research and Development founded

Acquired 25% of shares of Glacier Fish Company
Hokkaido Fine Chemicals Co., Ltd. founded

- 2009 – TN Fine Chemicals Co., Ltd. founded

Acquired Hokkaido Fine Chemicals Co from Nikkashi

- 2010 – Acquired shares of Delmar

Nordic Seafood A/S becomes consolidated subsidiary

- 2011 – Opening The Nissui Pioneer Exhibition Center
- 2012 – The Medium-Term Management Plan 2014(MVIP) was initiated.
- 2013 – "Yumigahama Suisan Co., Ltd" was established for domestic Coho Salmon farming.
- 2014 – Head office moved to Nishi-Shimbashi Square in Minato-ku, Tokyo.
- 2015 – Nissui sells part of its shareholding in ANZCO Foods to Itoham Foods
- 2018 – Nissui sells remaining part of its shareholding in ANZCO Foods to Itoham Foods
- 2019 – Acquired 75% of shares of Flatfish Ltd
- 2023 – Invested in first startup, Australian Asparagopsis producer, Immersion Group.

== See also ==
- Fishing industry in Japan
