= Sealord Group =

New Zealand seafood company

- Industry: Seafood
- Revenue: NZ$399 million (2020)
- Net income: NZD $29.3 million
- Subsidiaries: Independent Fisheries
- Website: sealord.com

Sealord Group is a New Zealand seafood company. It is based in Nelson, and is half owned by 57 iwi through Moana New Zealand, and half owned by the Japanese company Nissui. It is New Zealand's largest seafood company by revenue.

== History ==
Sealord was established in 1961. In 1992 half of the company was bought by Māori, through the Treaty of Waitangi (Fisheries Claims) Settlement Act 1992. It was a 50–50 split with Brierley Investments. In 2004 the shareholding was moved to Aotearoa Fisheries Limited, now named Moana New Zealand.

In 2000, Brierley Investments announced that they wanted to sell their 50% stake in Sealord. Bids for ownership were initially rejected by the government due to the bidders being foreign investors. This stake was acquired by Japanese company Nissui in 2001 for $207 million after it was approved by the New Zealand government on 16 January. This deal was in partnership with the Treaty of Waitangi Fisheries Commission. Between 1973 and 1990, Sealord was partially owned by Nissui.

Sealord started operations in Argentina in 2001. The company left the country in 2013 due to it being unprofitable. In May 2012 Sealord started selling their last mussel farms in the South Island, after previously owning over 50 farms in the South Island. It continued to operate mussel farms in the Hauraki Gulf.

Sealord opened a new factory trawler named Tokatu in November 2018. Tokatu took three years to build and cost the company $70 million. The launch included a ribbon-cutting ceremony and kapa haka by school students.

In July 2020, Sealord was fined $24,000 and was ordered to give up a $16 million vessel after illegally bottom trawling in a protected zone between 26 and 28 October 2018. Five times in this time period Sealord breached a benthic protection area (BPA) of the Mid-Chatham Rise. An employee realised that the ship was trawling in the protected area on 28 October and told the company. The Ministry for Primary Industries (MPI) detected the offending on 29 October, and on the same day, Sealord self-reported. The MPI seized the catch and sold it for $112,294. One worker was fined $7,500 and another $5,000.

On or before 20 June 2021, Sealord was charged after asbestos was found on one of their fishing vessels. A worker found insulation in a form that he did not recognise in a locker room. He told the ship's captain and was told that in 1994 the ship was tested and cleared of asbestos. The flag raised by the employee spurred testing and asbestos was found in the vessel, but not in the location the worker suspected. Sealord believed that it had been removed from the vessel in the 1980s. In December 2021, Maritime New Zealand expressed concern about the ship and required it to be tested for asbestos on returning to Nelson. It arrived in Nelson in December 2021, and 4 out of 22 asbestos samples returned positive. Sealord ceased using the ship on 13 January 2022, offloading its crew; it received asbestos clearance in March 2022. In August 2023, Sealord Group was convicted of endangering employees due to the asbestos in the Nelson District Court. In December 2023 Sealord was fined $257,250 and ordered to pay $3,000 reparation to two crew members and $30,000 legal costs.

In May 2023, Sealord brought in 115 workers from Vietnam for the hoki fishing season (May to September). In 2022 the company was short by 200 workers for the hoki season which cost the company $7 million.

In September 2023, Sealord agreed to acquire Independent Fisheries, which if completed and approved by the Commerce Commission, would make Sealord the largest seafood business in New Zealand. In the deal would be a quota of 46,000 metric tonnes, three deepwater factory fishing vessels (two owned, one chartered), a cold storage facility, and over 500 staff. The Commerce Commission approved the deal in November 2023, and the purchase was completed in February 2024, making it the largest seafood company in New Zealand by revenue.

On 6 September 2025, Sealord proposed closing its coated fish factory in Nelson, New Zealand, potentially affecting 79 jobs (including 57 factory roles and 22 management roles). On 26 September, the company proposed reducing its Nelson wetfish and by-products factories and fresh fish trawler operations from full-time to seasonal operations. This would involve eliminating 59 roles while preserving 81 permanent jobs and 400 seasonal jobs.

== Operations ==
Half of Sealord is owned by 57 iwi, and 80% of the company's profits go to the iwi.

Sealord farms salmon and trout in Australia, which as of 2013, represents 15% of their "balance sheet".
