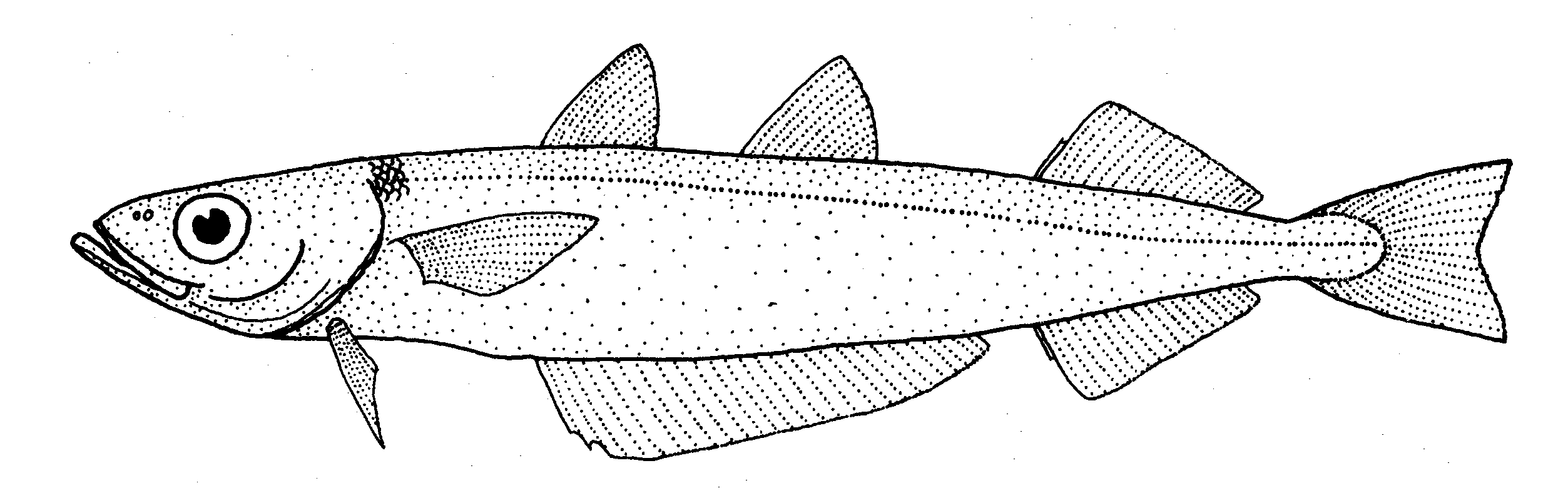
- Drawing by Dr Tony Ayling

Scientific classification
- Kingdom: Animalia
- Phylum: Chordata
- Class: Actinopterygii
- Order: Gadiformes
- Family: Gadidae
- Genus: Micromesistius
- Species: M. australis

Binomial name
- Micromesistius australis Norman, 1937

= Southern blue whiting =

Species of fish

The southern blue whiting (Micromesistius australis) is a codfish of the genus Micromesistius, found in the southern oceans with temperatures between 3 and 7 °C, at depths of 50 to 900 m. Its length is commonly between 30 and 60 cm, with a maximum length of 90 cm. Maximum weight is at least 1350 g.

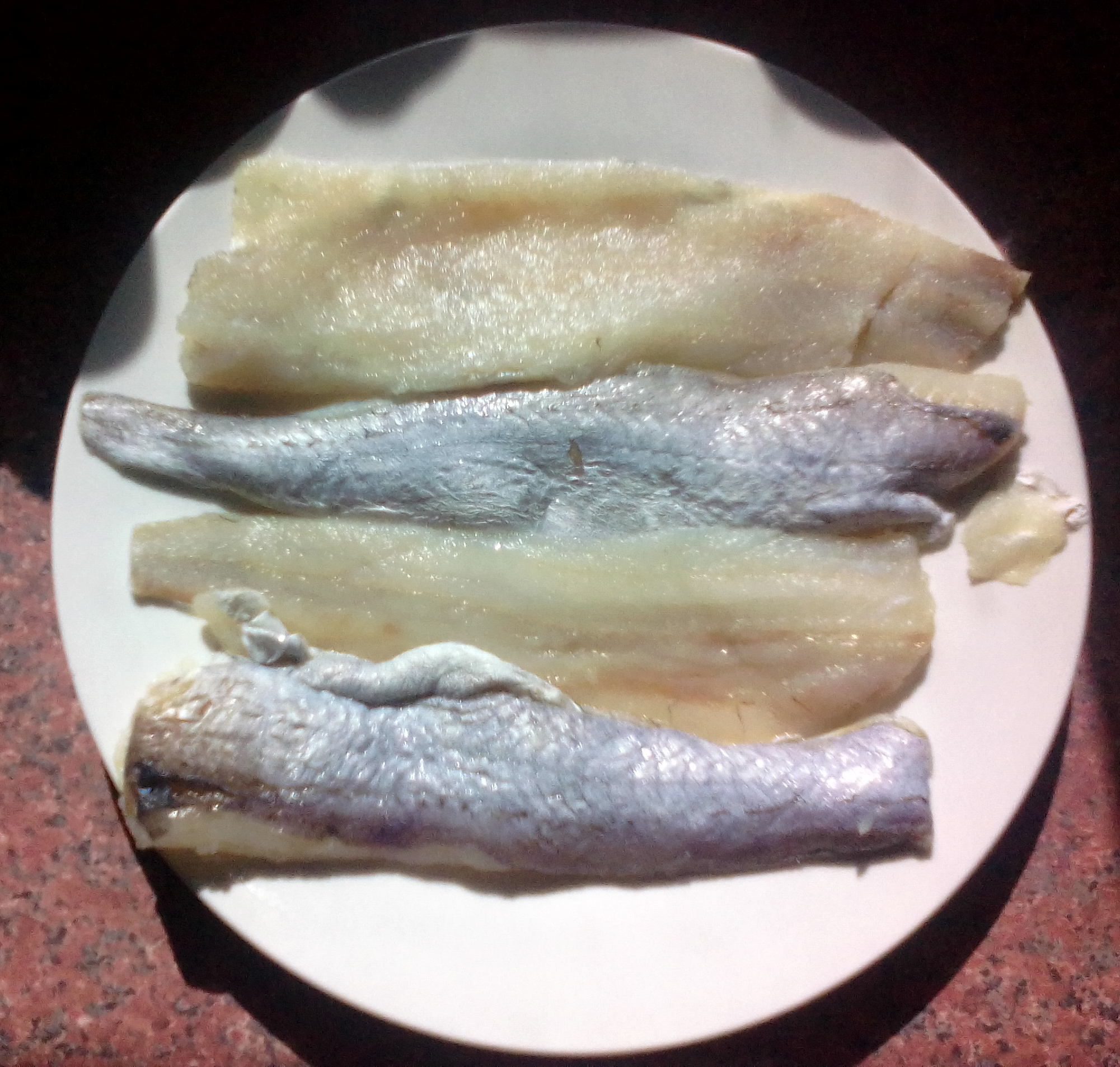
Southern blue whiting fillet

A related species, the blue whiting, Micromesistius poutassou, occurs in the Northern Hemisphere.

In Canada, according to Canadian Food Inspection Agency regulations and the list of acceptable fish species names, "Micromesistius australis" (or southern blue whiting) can also be referred to as blue cod. This well-known species is part of the family Gadidae and is a very versatile fish. It is most commonly filleted and served breaded or battered, but it is also well-suited to pan frying, oven baking and steaming. It has flaky white fillets and mild flavor with broad appeal to children and adults alike.

The two disjunct populations are:

- M. a. australis occurs around the Falkland Islands and Argentine Patagonia in the southwest Atlantic, off Chile in the southeast Pacific, and off South Georgia, South Shetland and South Orkney Islands.
- M. a. pallidus occurs around the South Island of New Zealand. Some evidence indicates southern blue whiting in this area may actually comprise multiple stocks.

Most of the southern blue whiting catch comes from New Zealand's Bounty Platform and Campbell Island Rise given the large numbers there. They are harvested mainly by mid-water and semi-pelagic trawl.

New Zealand southern blue whiting were the first blue whiting fisheries in the world to gain Marine Stewardship Council certification, the ‘gold standard’ for sustainable fisheries performance.
