= Joseph Butler (merchant) =

Joseph Butler (1 March 1862 – 30 September 1934) was a New Zealand sawmiller and timber merchant. He was born in Leamington, Warwickshire, England on 1 March 1862. He died in London in 1934, after having lived most of his life in New Zealand. He was a brother of William James Butler.
