= William James Butler =

English timber merchant (1858–1934)

- Born: 18 March 1858; Leamington, Warwickshire, England
- Died: 10 December 1932 (aged 74); Wellington, New Zealand
- Occupations: Sawmiller, timber merchant
- Known for: Timber and sawmilling industry in New Zealand
- Relatives: Joseph Butler (brother)

William James Butler (18 March 1858 – 10 December 1932) was a New Zealand sawmiller and timber merchant. He was born in Leamington, Warwickshire, England in 1858.

Butler was married. He died in Wellington in 1932. He was a brother of Joseph Butler.
