= Itoham Foods =

Japanese food company

Itoham Foods Inc.
- Native name: 伊藤ハム株式会社
- Romanized name: Itōhamu Kabushiki-gaisha
- Type: Public
- Traded as: TYO: 2284
- Industry: Food production
- Founded: June 29, 1948; 78 years ago in Izumiotsu, Osaka, Japan
- Founder: Itō Denzo
- Headquarters: Nishinomiya HQ: 4-27, Takahata-cho, Nishinomiya, Hyōgo Prefecture, Japan
- Area served: Worldwide
- Key people: Itō Koichi (president and CEO)
- Revenue: ▲¥145.966 billion (March 2024)
- Operating income: ▲¥1.978 billion (March 2024)
- Net income: ▲¥6.084 billion (March 2024)
- Total assets: ▲¥5.426 billion (March 2024)
- Total equity: ▲¥91.076 billion (March 2024)
- Owner: Itoham Yonekyu Holdings
- Website: itoham.co.jp

Itoham Foods Inc. (伊藤ハム株式会社, Itōhamu kabushiki gaisha) is a Japanese food company. Founded in April 1928 by Itō Denzo in Kita-ku, Osaka, the company specializes mainly in meat products and processing. The company's parent is Itoham Yonekyu Holdings.

Along with its competitors Nippon Ham, Prima Ham and Marudai Foods, it is one of the four major companies in the meat processing industry in Japan.

== History ==
Itoham was founded in 1928 by Itō Denzo in Osaka as a meat processing company, and subsequently released its first major product, Cellophane Wiener (later renamed Pole Wiener) in 1934. After the war, it was refounded in 1946 in Bingocho, Nada Ward, Kobe, then in 1948 as Ito Nutrition Food Industry Co., Ltd. In 1959, the company set up a plant in Meguro, Tokyo and entered the Kantō market. Secondary headquarters were built in 1997, which would later be used as the corporate headquarters of the merged holding. In 2013, it built a plant in Toride, Ibaraki.

With the creation of Itoham Yonekyu Holdings at the beginning of fiscal 2016, it became its subsidiary. In the next year, it acquired New Zealand company ANZCO Foods from Nissui.

== Products ==
=== Pole Wiener ===
Pole Wiener is Itoham's main sausage product, created in 1934 to set it apart from its competitors. It was initially known as Cellophane Wiener.

Sales soared in the Kansai region during the 1950s and was a common sight in school lunches from the 60s to the 90s, and is seen as a type of comfort food for Kansaians.

Despite producing over 100 million units annually (as of 2013) and being the company's fourth most-selling product (as of 2007), the product (as of 2013) is mainly sold in Kansai, where over 90% of sales come from, and is not available in Kanto.

== Criticism ==
=== Violation of the Customs Law ===
On June 22, 2005, the Tokyo District Public Prosecutors Office indicted the company as a legal entity under the provisions of the 1954 Customs Law.

A meat import company that sold meat to Itoham was found to violate the gate tariff system on the difference between Japanese and international prices by submitting declarations with higher unit prices than the actual one. Subsequently, a tax audit by the Osaka Regional Taxation Bureau revealed that the company failed to approximately 280 million yen in the five-year period ending March 31, 2003 (end of fiscal 2003), and was assessed with fiscal taxes of around 100 million yen, including heavy penalties.

=== Quality of the ground water in the Tokyo plant ===
The company announced on October 25, 2008 that it was using cyanide ions and cyanogen chloride, exceeding the standard levels, were detected at the Tokyo plant (located in Kashiwa, Chiba Prefecture. The company decided to recall some of its products coming from the plant. Although the problems were detected on September 24, it took them one month to announce the recall. It was later reported that the detected cyanogen chloride was due to hypochlorous acid used as a test reagent, and that the problem came with the testing method.

=== Tokyo plant toluene problem ===
A few days after the above incident, on October 31, following the detection of toluene in some of its sausage products from the Tokyo plant, Dai Nippon Printing announced that the cause was due to toluene coming from film packaging coming from DNP Tecnopack's own factory (in Sayama, Saitama Prefecture).

=== Animal abuse ===
In 2012, the American Humane Society accused its US affiliate company Wyoming Premium Farms of sexual abuse of pigs.

The society published a report on May 8, 2012, where it revealed that pigs were being left with their uteruses prolapsed from their anuses due to forced mating; piglets were swimming in pools of manure and were being abused by being slammed against walls and kicked hard. Footage showed employees bouncing on the backs of pigs with broken hind legs (rendering them unable to move), lying on the floor without food or water, and starving to death. The indictment was based on interviews and video footage.

On May 23, Itoham issued an apology on the affair and dismissed five employees.
