= List of public sector organisations in New Zealand =

In New Zealand, the Public Sector (Māori: Te Rāngai Tūmatanui) consists of organisations across the branches of government which are responsible for the discharge of the business of the Crown and the constitutional and democratic functioning of the state. Currently regulated by the Public Service Act 2020 and associated legislation (such as the Crown Entities Act 2004 and Public Finance Act 1989), the public sector in New Zealand consists of a core Public Service (Māori: Te Ratonga Tūmatanui) and other State Services under the control of the central executive government, as well as instruments of the local, legislative, and judicial branches of government. Collectively, the public sector is subject to the supervision of the Public Service Commission and financial regulatory agencies, with organisations closer to the core public service generally being subject to higher levels of government direction and commission regulation.

The public sector has been organised in this manner since 1988, following the passage of the State Sector Act; prior to this, New Zealand had a more traditional civil service similar to the United Kingdom with a greater degree of separation between the political and administrative aspects of government departments. The new act effectively broke up the public service from an institution which staffed departments into a looser grouping of the employees of individual departments and agencies, and split the executive branch into various levels: public sector, state sector, state services, and the public service, with organisations closer to the public service being subject to more direct ministerial control; this system has been largely maintained under the new Public Service Act, with reforms stripping out some of the previous layers and creating new joint boards and ventures to create a more joined-up public service while keeping the departmental structure introduced in 1988.

== Public Service ==
=== Public service departments ===
- Crown Law Office (Te Tari Ture o te Karauna)
- Department of Conservation (Te Papa Atawhai)
- Department of Corrections (Ara Poutama Aotearoa)
- Department of Internal Affairs (Te Tari Taiwhenua)
  - Archives New Zealand (Te Rua Mahara o te Kāwanatanga)
  - Births, Deaths and Marriages (Whānautanga, Matenga, Mārenatanga)
  - Censorship Compliance Unit
  - Charities Services (Ngā Ratonga Kaupapa Atawhai)
  - National Library of New Zealand (Te Puna Mātauranga o Aotearoa)
  - New Zealand Citizenship Office (Te Raraunga)
  - New Zealand Gazette Office (Te Kahiti o Aotearoa)
  - New Zealand Lottery Grants Board (Te Puna Tahua)
  - New Zealand Passports Office (Ngā Uruwhenua)
  - Office for the Community & Voluntary Sector (Tari mō te Rāngai ā-Hāpori, ā Tūao)
  - The Translation Service (Te Pūtahi Whakawhiti Reo)
- Department of the Prime Minister and Cabinet (Te Tari o te Pirimia me te Komiti Matua)
  - Cabinet Office
    - Honours Unit
  - National Assessments Bureau
- Education Review Office (Te Tari Arotake Mātauranga)
- Government Communications Security Bureau (Te Tira Tiaki)
  - National Cyber Security Centre
- Inland Revenue Department (Te Tari Taake)
- Land Information New Zealand (Toitu te Whenua)
  - Crown Property Management
  - New Zealand Geospatial Office
  - Overseas Investment Office
- Ministry for Cities, Environment, Regions and Transport
- Ministry for Culture and Heritage (Manatū Taonga)
- Ministry for Pacific Peoples (Manatū mō ngā Iwi o te Moana-nui-ā-Kiwa)
- Ministry for Primary Industries (Manatū Ahu Matua)
  - Agriculture & Investment Services (Tapuwae Ahuwhenua)
  - Biosecurity New Zealand (Tiakitanga Pūtaiao Aotearoa)
  - Fisheries New Zealand (Tini a Tangaroa)
  - He Taurikura Māori (Māori Partnerships & Investment)
  - New Zealand Food Safety (Haumaru Kai Aotearoa)
  - Te Uru Rākau (New Zealand Forest Service)
- Ministry for Regulation (Manatū Waeture)
- Ministry for Women (Manatū Wāhine)
- Ministry of Business, Innovation and Employment (Hīkina Whakatutuki)
  - Business.govt.nz
  - Companies Office
  - Consumer Protection
  - Electrical Workers Registration Board
  - Immigration New Zealand (Te Ratonga Manene)
  - Insolvency and Trustee Service
  - Intellectual Property Office of New Zealand
  - New Zealand Cycle Trail (Ngā Haerenga)
  - New Zealand Petroleum & Minerals
  - New Zealand Space Agency
  - Occupational Safety and Health (Te Ratonga Oranga)
  - Radio Spectrum Management
  - Standards New Zealand (Te Mana Tautikanga o Aotearoa)
- Ministry of Defence (Manatū Kaupapa Waonga)
- Whaikaha (Ministry of Disabled People)
- Ministry of Education (Te Tāhuhu o te Mātauranga)
- Ministry of Foreign Affairs and Trade (Te Manatū Aorere)
  - New Zealand Agency for International Development (Ngā Hoe Tuputupu-mai-tawhiti)
- Ministry of Health (Manatū Hauora)
  - HealthPAC
  - New Zealand Medicines and Medical Devices Safety Authority (a.k.a. Medsafe)
    - Medicines Adverse Reactions Committee
    - Medicines Assessment Advisory Committee
    - Medicines Classification Committee
    - Medicines Review Committee
  - Office of Radiation Safety
  - Whakarongorau Aotearoa (New Zealand Telehealth Services)
  - Public Health Agency (Te Pou Hauora Tūmatanui)
- Ministry of Justice (Tāhū o te Ture)
  - Crime Prevention Unit
- Te Puni Kōkiri (Ministry of Māori Development)
- Ministry of Social Development (Te Manatū Whakahiato Ora)
  - Heartland Services (Ngā Ratonga ki te Manawa o te Whenua)
  - Ministry of Youth Development (Te Manatū Whakahiato Taiohi)
  - The Office for Seniors (Te Tari Kaumātua)
  - Studylink (Hoto Akoranga)
  - Work and Income (Te Hiranga Tangata)
- New Zealand Customs Service (Te Mana Arai o Aotearoa)
- New Zealand Security Intelligence Service (Te Pā Whakamarumaru)
- Oranga Tamariki (Ministry for Children)
- Public Service Commission (Te Kawa Mataaho)
  - Leadership Development Centre (Ara Kaiarahitanga)
- Serious Fraud Office (Te Tari Hara Taware)
- Social Investment Agency (Toi Hau Tāngata)
- Statistics New Zealand (Tatauranga Aotearoa)
- The Treasury (Te Tai Ōhanga)
  - New Zealand Debt Management
  - New Zealand Export Credit

=== Departmental agencies ===
- Cancer Control Agency (Te Aho o Te Kahu) hosted by the Ministry of Health
- Charter School Agency (Te Tari Kura Hourua) hosted by the Ministry of Education
- Ministry for Ethnic Communities (Te Tari Mātāwaka) hosted by the Department of Internal Affairs
- National Emergency Management Agency (Te Rākau Whakamarumaru) hosted by the Department of Internal Affairs
- Te Tari Whakatau (Office of Treaty Settlements and Takutai Moana) hosted by the Ministry of Justice

=== Interdepartmental ventures ===
Though the new Public Service Act 2020 provides for the establishment of interdepartmental ventures as part of the core public service, as of 2026 no such ventures have been established.

=== Interdepartmental executive boards ===
- Border Executive Board hosted by the New Zealand Customs Service
- Climate Change Chief Executives Board hosted by the Ministry for the Environment
- Digital Executive Board hosted by the Department of Internal Affairs
- Family Violence and Sexual Violence Executive Board hosted by the Ministry of Justice
- Strategic Planning Reform Board hosted by the Ministry for the Environment

=== Crown agents ===
Crown agents are specific kind of crown entity, the other two (autonomous and independent crown entities) falling outside of the core public service. Under the Crown Entities Act 2004, Crown agents, despite being considered part of the public service, are only subject to some of the regulations imposed by the Public Service Commission, with each crown agent having a varying degree of accountability as defined by their founding statute.

- Accident Compensation Corporation (Te Kaporeihana Āwhina Hunga Whara) monitored by the Ministry of Business, Innovation and Employment
- Callaghan Innovation (Te Pokapū Auaha) monitored by the Ministry of Business, Innovation and Employment
  - Industrial Research Limited (Te Tauihu Pūtaiao)
  - Measurement Standards Laboratory of New Zealand
- Civil Aviation Authority (Te Mana Rererangi Tūmatanui o Aotearoa) monitored by the Ministry of Transport
  - Aviation Security Service (Kaiwhakamaru Rererangi)
- Education New Zealand (Manapou ki te Ao) monitored by the Ministry of Education
- Energy Efficiency and Conservation Authority (Te Tare Tiaki Pūngao) monitored by the Ministry for the Environment
- Environmental Protection Authority (Te Mana Rauhī Taiao) monitored by the Ministry for the Environment
- Fire and Emergency New Zealand (Whakaratonga Iwi) monitored by the Department of Internal Affairs
- Health New Zealand (Te Whatu Ora) monitored by the Ministry of Health
- Health Quality and Safety Commission (Te Tāhū Hauora Health) monitored by the Ministry of Health
- Health Research Council of New Zealand monitored by the Ministry of Health
- Herenga ā Nuku Aotearoa (Outdoor Access Commmision) monitored by the Ministry for Primary Industries
- Kāinga Ora (Homes and Communities) monitored by the Ministry of Housing & Urban Development
- Maritime New Zealand (Nō te rere moana Aotearoa) monitored by the Ministry of Transport
- Natural Hazards Commission (Toka Tū Ake) monitored by The Treasury
- New Zealand Antarctic Institute (a.k.a. Antarctica New Zealand) monitored by the Ministry of Foreign Affairs and Trade
- New Zealand Blood Service (Te Ratonga Toto o Aotearoa) monitored by the Ministry of Health
- New Zealand Qualifications Authority (Mana Tohu Mātauranga o Aotearoa) monitored by the Ministry of Education
- New Zealand Tourism Board (a.k.a. Tourism New Zealand, Manaakitanga Aotearoa) monitored by the Ministry of Business, Innovation and Employment
- New Zealand Trade and Enterprise (Te Taurapa Tūhono) monitored by the Ministry of Business, Innovation and Employment and the Ministry of Foreign Affairs and Trade
- New Zealand Transport Agency (Waka Kotahi) monitored by the Ministry of Transport
- Pharmaceutical Management Agency (Te Pātaka Whaioranga, a.k.a. Pharmac) monitored by the Ministry of Health
- Real Estate Authority (Te Mana Papawhenua) monitored by the Ministry of Justice
- Social Workers Registration Board (Kāhui Whakamana Tauwhiro) monitored by the Ministry of Social Development
- Sport and Recreation New Zealand (a.k.a. Sport New Zealand, Ihi Aotearoa) monitored by the Ministry for Culture and Heritage
- Water Services Authority (Taumata Arowai) monitored by the Department of Internal Affairs
- Tertiary Education Commission (Te Amorangi Mātauranga Matua) monitored by the Ministry of Education
  - Careers New Zealand
- WorkSafe New Zealand (Mahi Haumaru Aotearoa) monitored by the Ministry of Business, Innovation and Employment

== Wider state services organisations ==
=== Executive non-public service departments ===
These departments, though falling under the executive branch and being subject to ministerial direction, are not considered part of the core public service and as such are not subject to the same public service standards of the public service departments due to their unique character as uniformed and political services.

- New Zealand Defence Force (Te Ope Kaatua o Aotearoa)
  - New Zealand Cadet Forces (Te Taua Tauira o Aotearoa)
    - New Zealand Cadet Corps
    - Sea Cadet Corps
    - Air Training Corps
  - Armed Forces of New Zealand
    - New Zealand Army (Ngāti Tumatauenga)
      - Regular Force
      - Territorial Force
      - Army Reserve
    - New Zealand Naval Forces
      - Royal New Zealand Navy (Te Taua Moana o Aotearoa)
      - Royal New Zealand Naval Reserve
      - Royal New Zealand Naval Volunteer Reserve
      - Naval Reserves
    - Royal New Zealand Air Force (Te Tauaarangi o Aotearoa)
      - Regular Air Force
      - Territorial Air Force
      - Air Force Reserve
  - Veterans' Affairs New Zealand (Te Tira Ahu Ika a Whiro) (semi-autonomous body)
- New Zealand Police (Ngā Pirihimana o Aotearoa)
  - Organised and Financial Crime Agency of New Zealand
- Parliamentary Counsel Office (Te Tari Tohutohu Pāremata)

=== The Reserve Bank ===
The Reserve Bank of New Zealand (Te Pūtea Matua) is a category of state sector agency in its own right.

=== Arms-length agencies ===
==== Autonomous crown entities ====
- Accreditation Council monitored by the Ministry of Business, Innovation and Employment
  - International Accreditation New Zealand
  - Telarc Limited
- Arts Council of New Zealand Toi Aotearoa (a.k.a. Creative New Zealand) monitored by the Ministry for Culture and Heritage
- Broadcasting Commission (a.k.a. New Zealand On Air, Irirangi Te Motu)
- Government Superannuation Fund Authority (Te Pūtea Penihana Kāwanatanga) monitored by The Treasury
- Guardians of New Zealand Superannuation monitored by The Treasury
  - New Zealand Superannuation Fund (Te Kaiatiaki Tahua Penihana Kaumātua o Aotearoa)
- Heritage New Zealand (Pouhere Taonga) monitored by the Ministry for Culture and Heritage
- Museum of New Zealand (Te Papa Tongarewa) monitored by the Ministry for Culture and Heritage
- New Zealand Artificial Limb Service (Peke Waihanga) monitored by the Ministry of Social Development
- New Zealand Film Commission (Te Tumu Whakaata Taonga) monitored by the Ministry for Culture and Heritage
- New Zealand Infrastructure Commission (a.k.a. Infracom, Te Waihanga) monitored by The Treasury
- New Zealand Lotteries Commission (a.k.a. Lotto New Zealand) monitored by The Treasury
- New Zealand Symphony Orchestra (Te Tira Pūoro o Aotearoa) monitored by the Ministry for Culture and Heritage
- Public Trust monitored by the Ministry of Justice and The Treasury
- Te Ara Ahunga Ora (Retirement Commission) monitored by the Ministry of Social Development
- Te Māngai Pāho (Maori Broadcasting Funding Agency) monitored by Te Puni Kōkiri
- Te Taura Whiri I Te Reo Māori (Māori Language Commission) monitored by Te Puni Kōkiri

==== Independent crown entities ====
- Broadcasting Standards Authority (Te Mana Whanonga Kaipāho) monitored by the Ministry for Culture and Heritage
- Children's Commissioner (Mana Mokopuna) monitored by the Ministry of Social Development
- Climate Change Commission (He Pou a Rangi) monitored by the Ministry for the Environment
- Commerce Commission (Te Konihana Tauhokohoko) monitored by the Ministry of Business, Innovation and Employment
- Criminal Cases Review Commission (Te Kāhui Tātari Ture) monitored by the Ministry of Justice
- Electoral Commission (Te Kaitiaki Take Kōwhiri) monitored by the Ministry of Justice
- Electricity Authority (Te Mana Hiko) monitored by the Ministry of Business, Innovation and Employment
- External Reporting Board (Te Kāwai Ārahi Pūrongo Mōwaho) monitored by the Ministry of Business, Innovation and Employment
- Financial Markets Authority (Te Mana Tātai Hokohoko) monitored by the Ministry of Business, Innovation and Employment
- Health and Disability Commissioner (Te Toihau Hauora, Hauātanga) monitored by the Ministry of Health
- Human Rights Commission (Te Kāhui Tika Tangata) monitored by the Ministry of Justice
- Independent Monitor of the Oranga Tamiriki System (a.k.a. Independent Children's Monitor, Aroturuki Tamariki) monitored by the Ministry of Social Development
- Independent Police Conduct Authority (Mana Whanonga Pirihimana Motuhake) monitored by the Ministry of Justice
- Integrity Sport and Recreation Commission (a.k.a. Sport Integrity Commission, Te Kahu Raunui) monitored by the Ministry for Culture and Heritage
  - Drug Free Sport New Zealand
- Law Commission (Te Aka Matua o te Ture) monitored by the Ministry of Justice
- Office of Film and Literature Classification (Te Tari Whakarōpū Tukuata, Tuhituhinga, a.k.a. The Classification Office, Te Mana Whakaatu) monitored by the Department of Internal Affairs
- Privacy Commissioner (Te Mana Mātāpono Matapu) monitored by the Ministry of Justice
- Takeovers Panel (Te Pae Whitimana) monitored by the Ministry of Business, Innovation and Employment
- Te Hiringa Mahara (Mental Health and Wellbeing Commission) monitored by the Ministry of Health
- Transport Accident Investigation Commission (Te Kōmihana Tirotiro Aituā Waka) monitored by the Ministry of Transport

==== Public Finance Act Schedule 4 organisations ====
These organisations are specifically listed in the Public Finance Act 1989 and, though largely independent from central government, must adhere to certain standards for crown entities such as financial reporting, performance reporting, and providing certain information to the government.

- Agricultural and Marketing Research and Development Trust
- Asia New Zealand Foundation (Te Whītau Tūhono)
- National Pacific Radio Trust
- Ngāi Tahu Ancillary Claims Trust (currently inactive)
- Pacific Cooperation Foundation
- Pacific Island Business Development Trust
- Game Animal Council
- The Māori Trustee (Te Tumu Paeroa)
- New Zealand Game Bird Habitat Trust Board
- New Zealand Government Property Corporation
- New Zealand Fish and Game Council
- New Zealand Lottery Grants Board (Te Puna Tahua)
- 12 Regional Fish and Game Councils
  - Auckland and Waikato
  - Central South Island
  - Eastern
  - Hawke's Bay
  - Nelson Marlborough
  - North Canterbury
  - Northland
  - Otago
  - Southland
  - Taranaki
  - Wellington
  - West Coast
- 16 Reserve Boards
  - Ōakura Recreation Reserve Board
  - Ruakākā Bay Recreation Reserve Board
  - Ruakākā Local Reserve Board
  - Taurikura Hall Reserve Board
  - Waipū Cove Recreation Reserve Board
  - Pākaitore/Moutoa Gardens Historic Reserve Board
  - Awakaponga Local Reserve Board
  - Lake Rotoiti Recreation Reserve Board
  - Lake Horowhenua Recreation Reserve Board
  - Poukiore Recreation Reserve Board
  - Whitireia Park Recreation Reserve Board
  - Tiriraukawa Hall Reserve Board
  - Homewood Hall Reserve Board
  - Kaiteriteri Recreation Reserve Board
  - Millerton Hall Reserve Board
  - Charleston Local Reserve Board

=== Crown-owned companies ===
==== Crown entity companies ====
- Auckland Light Rail Limited monitored by the Ministry of Transport
- Crown Irrigation Investments Limited monitored by the Ministry for Primary Industries
- New Zealand Growth Capital Partners Limited monitored by the Ministry of Business, Innovation and Employment
- Radio New Zealand Limited (Te Reo Irirangi o Aotearoa) monitored by The Treasury and the Ministry for Culture and Heritage
- Television New Zealand Limited (Te Reo Tātaki o Aotearoa) monitored by The Treasury and the Ministry for Culture and Heritage

===== Public Research Organisations =====
- New Zealand Institute for Earth Sciences (a.k.a. Earth Sciences New Zealand) replacing the old crown research institutes of National Institute of Water and Atmospheric Research, MetService and GNS Science.
  - Natural Hazards and Resilience Platform
- New Zealand Institute for Bioeconomy Science (a.k.a. Bioeconomy Science Institute, Maiangi Taiao) replacing AgResearch, Manaaki Whenua – Landcare Research, Plant & Food Research and Scion.
- New Zealand Institute for Public Health and Forensic Science (a.k.a. PHF Science) replacing the Institute of Environmental Science and Research.
- New Zealand Institute for Advanced Technology

==== Public Finance Act Schedule 4a companies ====
- City Rail Link Limited
- Crown Regional Holdings Limited
- Crown Infrastructure Delivery Limited
- Education Payroll Limited (Rārangi Utu ā-Mātauranga)
- Ferry Holdings Limited
- Kiwi Group Capital Limited
  - Kiwibank Limited
    - Kiwibank Investment Management Limited
  - The New Zealand Home Loan Company Limited
- National Infrastructure Funding and Financing Limited
- Ngāpuhi Investment Fund Limited (Tupu Tonu)
- Predator Free 2050 Limited
- Research and Education Advanced Network New Zealand Limited
- Southern Response Earthquake Services Limited (Urupare ki te Tonga)
- Tāmaki Redevelopment Company Limited
- The Network for Learning Limited (a.k.a. N4L)

=== Education service ===
See: Education in New Zealand

- 2,425 School Boards of Trustees
- 27 Kindergarten Associations

== Wider public sector organisations ==
=== Legislative non-public service departments ===
- Office of the Clerk of the House of Representatives (Te Tari o te Manahautū o te Whare Māngai)
  - Reporting Services (a.k.a. Hansard)
- Parliamentary Service (Te Ratonga Whare Pāremata)
  - New Zealand Parliamentary Library

=== Offices of Parliament ===
- Office of the Controller and Auditor-General (Te Rati o te Tumuaki o te Mana Arotake, a.k.a. The Audit Office, Te Mana Arotake)
- Office of the Ombudsman (Te Rati o te Kaitiaki Mana Tangata)
- Office of the Parliamentary Commissioner for the Environment (Te Rati o te Kaitiaki Taiao a Te Whare Pāremata Aotearoa)

=== Independent crown-owned companies ===
==== State-owned enterprises ====
The various SOEs are gazetted under Schedule 1 of the State-Owned Enterprises Act 1989, and largely consist of former government departments that have been corporatised.

- Airways Corporation of New Zealand Limited (a.k.a. Airways New Zealand)
- Animal Control Products Limited (a.k.a. Pestoff)
- AsureQuality Limited (Kaitiaki Kai)
- Electricity Corporation of New Zealand Limited (a.k.a. Electricorp)
- KiwiRail Holdings Limited
- Kordia
- Landcorp Farming Limited (a.k.a. Pāmu)
- New Zealand Post Limited (Tukurau Aotearoa)
- New Zealand Railways Corporation
- Quotable Value Limited (Te Tari Wāriu)
- Transpower New Zealand Limited

==== Mixed-ownership model companies ====
- Genesis Energy Limited
- Mercury NZ Limited
- Meridian Energy Limited

=== Tertiary education institutions ===
State-owned tertiary institutions consist of universities, colleges of education (teachers' training colleges), polytechnics (institutes of technology) and wānanga. In addition there are numerous non-state-owned private training establishments.

==== Universities ====
(and amalgamated colleges of education, with principal campus only)

- AUT University (Te Wananga Aronui o Tāmaki Makau Rau) (Auckland)
- Lincoln University (Te Whare Wanaka o Aoraki) (Lincoln)
- Massey University (Te Kunenga ki Purehuroa) (Palmerston North)
  - Palmerston North College of Education
- University of Auckland (Waipapa Taumata Rau) (Auckland)
  - Auckland College of Education (Te Kura Akoranga o Tamaki Makaurau)
- University of Canterbury (Te Whare Wānanga o Waitaha) (Christchurch)
  - Christchurch College of Education (Te Whare Whai Mātauraka Ki Ōtautahi)
- University of Otago (Te Whare Wānanga o Otāgo) (Dunedin)
  - University of Otago College of Education (Te Kura Akau Taitoka)
- University of Waikato (Te Whare Wānanga o Waikato) (Hamilton)
  - Hamilton Teachers' Training College
- Victoria University of Wellington (Te Herenga Waka) (Wellington)
  - Wellington College of Education (Te Whānau o Ako Pai ki te Upoko o te Ika)

==== Institutes of technology and polytechnics ====
(with principal campus only)

- Ara Institute of Canterbury (Christchurch)
- Eastern Institute of Technology (Te Whare Takiura o Kahungungu) (Taradale)
- Manukau Institute of Technology (Te Whare Takiura o Manukau)/Unitec Institute of Technology (Te Whare Wānanga o Wairaka) (Auckland)
- Nelson Marlborough Institute of Technology (Te Whare Wānanga o Te Taui Iu o Te Waka a Mauī) (Nelson)
- Otago Polytechnic (Te Kura Matatini ki Otago) (Dunedin)
- The Open Polytechnic of New Zealand (Kuratini Tuwhera) (Lower Hutt)
- Southern Institute of Technology (Te Whare Wānanga o Murihiku) (Invercargill)
- Toi Ohomai Institute of Technology (Rotorua, Tauranga)
- Universal College of Learning (Te Pae Mātauranga ki te Ao) (Palmerston North)
- Waikato Institute of Technology (Te Kuratini o Waikato, a.k.a. WinTec) (Hamilton)
- New Zealand Institute of Skills and Technology (Te Pūkenga)
  - NorthTec (Tai Tokerau Wānanga) (Whangarei)
  - Tai Poutini Polytechnic (Greymouth)
  - Western Institute of Technology at Taranaki (Te Kura Matatini o Taranaki) (New Plymouth)
  - Wellington Institute of Technology (Te Whare Wānanga o te Awakairangi, a.k.a. WelTec) (Lower Hutt)
  - Whitireia New Zealand (Te Kura Matatini o Whitireia) (Porirua)

==== Wānanga ====
(with principal campus only)

The following wānanga are those who have been granted Crown entity status; there are many that have not.

- Te Wānanga o Aotearoa (Te Awamutu)
- Te Wānanga o Raukawa (Ōtaki)
- Te Whare Wānanga o Awanuiārangi (Whakatāne)

=== Agencies associated with a ministerial portfolio ===
The Public Service Commission considers various agencies which are associated with a ministerial portfolio to be part of the wider public sector, including:

- Antarctic Heritage Trust
- National War Memorial Advisory Council
- New Zealand Music Commission (Te Reo Reka o Aotearoa)
- New Zealand Archive of Film, Television and Sound (Ngā Taonga Whitiāhua me Ngā Taonga Kōrero a.k.a. Ngā Taonga Sound & Vision)
- The Pukaki Trust
  - New Zealand Alpine Lavender Limited
  - Pukaki Forestry Limited
  - Southern Serenity Limited
  - Pukaki Tourism Marketing Limited
  - Pukaki Village Holdings Limited
- Royal New Zealand Ballet
- Te Māori Manaaki Taonga Trust
- Te Matatini Society Incorporated
- Joint Accreditation System of Australia and New Zealand
- Dispute resolution schemes
  - Banking Ombudsmen Scheme (Te Whare Rare Tōkeke)
  - Insurance & Financial Services Ombudsman Scheme
  - Electricity and Gas Complaints Commissioner Scheme
  - Telecommunications Dispute Resolution Limited
- Standards Approval Board
- Charities Registration Board (Te Rātā Atawhai)
- Norman Kirk Memorial Trust
- Winston Churchill Memorial Trust
- 15 Conservation Boards
  - Te Hiku o Te Ika Conservation Board
  - Northland Conservation Board (Te Rūnanga Papa Atawhai O Te Tai Tokerau)
  - Auckland Conservation Board
  - Waikato Conservation Board
  - Bay of Plenty Conservation Board
  - East Coast Hawke's Bay Conservation Board
  - Tongariro Taupō Conservation Board
  - Taranaki/Whanganui Conservation Board
  - Wellington Conservation Board
  - Chatham Islands Conservation Board
  - Nelson Marlborough Conservation Board
  - West Coast Tai Poutini Conservation Board
  - Canterbury Aoraki Conservation Board
  - Otago Conservation Board
  - Southland Conservation Board
- Guardians of Lakes Manapouri, Monowai and Te Anau
- Guardians of Lake Wānaka
- Kaikōura Marine Guardians
- Nature Heritage Fund
- New Zealand Conservation Authority (Te Pou Atawhai Taiao O Aotearoa)
- Ngā Whenua Rāhui
- Queen Elizabeth II National Trust
- Waitangi National Trust
- New Zealand Parole Board
- Armed Forces Canteen Council
- Defence Employers Support Council (Te Arawhiti ki te Hapori)
- Music Teachers’ Registration Board (a.k.a. the Institute of Registered Music Teachers of New Zealand, Ako Puoro)
- New Zealand Council for Educational Research (Rangahau Mātauranga o Aotearoa)
- New Zealand National Commission for UNESCO (Te Kōmihana Matua o Aotearoa)
- Ngarimu VC and 28th (Maori) Battalion Memorial Scholarship Fund Board
- Pacific Islands Polynesian Education Foundation
- Teaching Council of Aotearoa New Zealand
- Gas Industry Company
- Gas Rulings Panel
- Electricity Rulings Panel
- Fiordland Marine Guardians
- Government Superannuation Appeals Board
- 12 Community Trusts
  - Foundation North (Pūtea Hāpai Oranga)
  - Trust Waikato (Te Puna o Waikato)
  - Toi Foundation
  - Bay Trust
  - Eastern & Central Community Trust
  - Whanganui Community Foundation
  - Wellington Community Fund (Te Upoko o te Ika)
  - Rātā Foundation
  - West Coast Community Trust
  - Community Trust of Mid and South Canterbury
  - Otago Community Trust
  - Community Trust South (Te Pou Arataki Pounamu o Murihiku)
- Public Advisory Committee on Disarmament and Arms Control
- Pacific Development and Conservation Trust
- Peace and Disarmament Education Trust
- Advisory Committee on Assisted Reproductive Technology
- Ethics Committee on Assisted Reproductive Technology
- Expert Advisory Committee on Drugs
- Health and Disability Ethics Committees
- Health Practitioners Disciplinary Tribunal (Te Rōpū Whakatika Kaimahi Hauora)
- Mental Health Review Tribunal
- National Ethics Advisory Committee (Kāhui Matatika o te Motu)
- National Kaitiaki Group
- Pharmacology and Therapeutics Advisory Committee
- Psychoactive Substances Appeals Committee
- Psychoactive Substances Expert Advisory Committee
- Radiation Safety Advisory Council
- 18 Health Responsible Authority Boards and Councils
  - Chinese Medicine Council of New Zealand (新西兰中医管理局)
  - New Zealand Chiropractic Board (Te Poari Kaikorohiti o Aotearoa)
  - Dental Council (Te Kaunihera Tiaki Niho)
  - Dietitians Board (Te Mana Mātanga Mātai Kai)
  - Medical Sciences Council of New Zealand (Te Kaunihera Pūtaiao Hauora O Aotearoa)
  - New Zealand Medical Radiation Technologists Board (Te Poari Ringa Hangarau Iraruke)
  - Medical Council of New Zealand (Te Kaunihera Rata o Aotearoa)
  - Midwifery Council (Te Tatau o te Whare Kahu)
  - Nursing Council of New Zealand (Te Kaunihera Tapuhi o Aotearoa)
  - Occupational Therapy Board of New Zealand (Te Poari Whakaora Ngangahau o Aotearoa)
  - Optometrists and Dispensing Opticians Board (Te Poari o ngā Kaimātai Whatu me ngā Kaiwhakarato Mōhiti)
  - Osteopathic Council of New Zealand (Kaunihera Haumanu Tuahiwi o Aotearoa)
  - Paramedic Council (Kaunihera Manapou)
  - Pharmacy Council of New Zealand (Te Pou Whakamana Kaimatū o Aotearoa)
  - Physiotherapy Board of New Zealand (Te Poari Tiaki Tinana o Aotearoa)
  - Podiatrists Board of New Zealand (Te Poari Tiaki Waewae o Aotearoa)
  - New Zealand Psychologists Board (Te Poari Kaimātai Hinengaro o Aotearoa)
  - Psychotherapists Board of Aotearoa New Zealand (Te Poari o ngā Kaihaumanu Hinengaro o Aotearoa)
- Archives Council (Te Rua Wānanga)
- Film and Literature Board of Review
- Gambling Commission New Zealand
- Guardians Kaitiaki of the Alexander Turnbull Library
- Library and Information Advisory Commission
- Legal Complaints Review Officer
- Representation Commission (Te Kōmihana Whakaatanga Rohe Pōti)
- Cadastral Surveyors Licensing Board
- New Zealand Geographic Board (Ngā Pou Taunaha o Aotearoa)
- Valuers Registration Board
- Local Government Commission (Mana Kāwanatanga ā Rohe)
- Māori Purposes Fund Board
- New Zealand Māori Council (Te Kaunihera Maori o Aoteaora)
- Te Ohu Kaimoana
- Whakaata Māori (Māori Television Service)
- Racing Integrity Board
- Racing New Zealand
- TAB New Zealand
- Marsden Fund Council
- Royal Society of New Zealand (Te Apārangi)
- Science Board
- Social Security Appeal Authority
- Social Workers Complaints and Disciplinary Tribunal
- Student Allowance Appeals Authority
- Christchurch International Airport Limited
- Dunedin International Airport Limited
- Hawke's Bay Airport Limited
- Veterans' Advisory Board
- Veterans' Entitlements Appeal Board
- Veterans' Health Advisory Panel
- Employment Relations Authority (Te Ratonga Ahumana Taimahi)
- Mines Rescue Trust Board
- Remuneration Authority (Te Mana Utu Matua)
- Plumbers, Gasfitters and Drainlayers Board
- Parliamentary Service Commission
- Te Mātāwai

=== Local government ===
Local government in New Zealand consists of city councils, district councils and regional councils. These are all also known as "local authorities". City councils and district councils are collectively known as territorial authorities. Local authorities may set up various council-controlled organisations for specific purposes.

==== Regional councils ====
This list of regional councils includes the unitary authorities of Auckland, Gisborne, Tasman, Nelson, and Marlborough, which act as both regional councils and territorial authorities in one. It does not include the Chatham Islands Council, which is officially considered a district council despite holding some (but not all) of the powers of a regional council.

- Northland Regional Council (Te Kaunihera ā-Rohe o Te Taitokerau)
- Auckland Council (Te Kaunihera o Tāmaki Makaurau)
- Waikato Regional Council (Te Kaunihera ā-Rohe o Waikato)
- Bay of Plenty Regional Council (Toi Moana)
- Gisborne District Council (Te Kaunihera o Te Tairāwhiti)
- Hawke's Bay Regional Council (Te Kaunihera ā-Rohe o Te Matau-a-Māui)
- Taranaki Regional Council
- Manawatū-Whanganui Regional Council (Te Kaunihera ā-rohe o Manawatū-Whanganui, a.k.a. Horizons Regional Council)
- Greater Wellington Regional Council (Te Pane Matua Taiao)
- Tasman District Council (Te Kaunihera o te tai o Aorere)
- Nelson City Council (Te Kaunihera o Whakatū)
- Marlborough District Council (Te Tauihu-o-te-waka)
- West Coast Regional Council
- Canterbury Regional Council (a.k.a. Environment Canterbury, Kaunihera Taiao ki Waitaha)
- Otago Regional Council (Te Kaunihera ā-Rohe o Otago)
- Southland Regional Council (a.k.a. Environment Southland, Te Taiao Tonga)

== Historic organisations ==
- Audit Department (Te Tari Arotake o te Motu) 1878–2001, replaced by the Office of the Controller and Auditor-General
- Alcohol Advisory Council of New Zealand (Kaunihera Whakatūpato Waipiro o Aotearoa) 1976–2012, merged into the Health Promotion Agency
- Accounting Standards Review Board 1993–2011, replaced by the External Reporting Board
- Building Industry Authority 1992–2004, merged into the Department of Building and Housing
- Charities Commission 2005–2011, replaced by Charities Services
- Child, Youth and Family (Te Tari Awhina i te Tamaiti, te Rangatahi, tae atu ki te Whānau) 1999–2017, replaced by Oranga Tamariki
- Children and Young People's Commission (Mana Mokopuna) 2022–2025, replaced by the Children's Commissioner
- Civil Aviation Department 1931–1968, merged into the Ministry of Transport
- Department of Island Territories 1919–1975, absorbed into the Ministry of Foreign Affairs and Trade
- Department of External Affairs 1943–1970, replaced by the Ministry of Foreign Affairs and Trade
- Department of Labour (Te Tari Mahi) 1891–2012, merged into the Ministry of Business, Innovation and Employment
- Department of Lands and Survey 1876–1987, dissolved into the Department of Conservation, the Department of Survey and Land Information, and Landcorp
- Department of Survey and Land Information (Te Puna Kōrero Whenua) 1987–1996, replaced by Land Information New Zealand
- Land Transport New Zealand (Ikiiki Whenua Aotearoa) 2004–2008, merged into the New Zealand Land Transport Agency
- Department of Industries and Commerce 1894–1972, replaced by the Department of Trade and Industry
- Department of Trade and Industry 1972–1998, dissolved into the Ministry of Commerce and Ministry of Foreign Affairs and Trade
- Department of Scientific and Industrial Research 1926–1992, dissolved into the Crown Research Institutes
- Department of Māori Affairs (Tari Māori) 1906–1989, dissolved into the Ministry of Māori Affairs and the Iwi Transition Agency
- Department of Justice 1872–1995, dissolved into the Ministry of Justice, Department for Courts, and Department of Corrections
- Department for Courts (Te Tari Kooti) 1995–2003, absorbed into the Ministry of Justice
- Department of Education (Te Tari Mātauranga) 1877–1989, dissolved into the Ministry of Education, New Zealand Qualifications Authority, Tertiary Education Commission, and Education Review Office
- Department of Social Welfare 1972–1998, dissolved into the Ministry of Social Policy and Department of Work and Income
- Department of Building and Housing (Te Tari Kaupapa Whare) 2004–2012, merged into the Ministry of Business, Innovation and Employment
- Department of Work and Income 1998–2001, merged into the Ministry of Social Development
- Department of Agriculture 1892–1972, merged into the Ministry of Agriculture and FIsheries
- Foundation for Research, Science and Technology (Tūāpapa Rangahau Pūtaiao) 1990–2011, merged into the Ministry of Science and Innovation
- Horticulture and Food Research Institute of New Zealand Limited (Rangahau Ahumāra, a.k.a. HortResearch) 1992–2008, merged into the New Zealand Institute for Plant and Food Research
- Health Promotion Agency (Te Hiringa Hauora) 2012–2022, merged into Health New Zealand
- Health Sponsorship Council 1990–2012, merged into the Health Promotion Agency
- Housing New Zealand 1974–2018, merged into Kāinga Ora
- Institute For Social Research and Development Limited (Te Kura Kōkiri, Rangahau-ā-Iwi o Aotearoa) 198?–1995, dissolved
- Iwi Transition Agency (Te Tira Ahu Iwi) 1989–1991, merged into Te Puni Kōkiri
- Learning Media Limited (Te Pou Taki Kōrero) 1993–2013, dissolved and privatised
- Legal Services Agency (Pokapū Ratonga Ture) 2000–2011, absorbed into the Ministry of Justice
- Land Transport Safety Authority 1993–2004, merged into Land Transport New Zealand
- Marine Department 1866–1972, absorbed into the Ministry of Transport
- Mines Department 1891–1974, merged into the Ministry of Energy
- Ministry of Energy 1978–1990, dissolved into Ministry of Commerce, Electricity Corporation of New Zealand Limited, Transpower Limited, and private generation companies
- Ministry of Research, Science and Technology (Te Manatū Pūtaiao) 1989–2011, merged into the Ministry of Science and Innovation
- Ministry of Science and Innovation (Te Pūnaha Hiringa Whakaea) 2011–2012, merged into the Ministry of Business, Innovation and Employment
- Ministry of Economic Development (Manatū Ōhanga) 2000–2012, merged into the Ministry of Business, Innovation and Employment
- Ministry of Works and Development 1871–1993, dissolved and privatised
- Ministry of Commerce 1988–2000, replaced by the Ministry of Economic Development
- Ministry of Māori Affairs (Manatū Māori) 1989–1991, merged into Te Puni Kōkiri
- Ministry of Social Policy 1998–2001, merged into the Ministry of Social Development
- Ministry of Housing 1991–2004, merged into the Department of Building and Housing
- Ministry of Agriculture and Fisheries 1972–1998, dissolved into the Ministry of Fisheries and the Ministry of Agriculture and Forestry
- Ministry of Fisheries (Te Tautiaki i nga tini a Tangaroa) 1995–2011, absorbed into the Ministry of Agriculture and Forestry
- Ministry of Agriculture and Forestry (Te Manatu Ahuwhenua, Ngāherehere) 1998–2012, replaced by the Ministry for Primary Industries
- Ministry for the Environment (Manatū Mō Te Taiao) 1986–2026, absorbed into the Ministry for Cities, Environment, Regions and Transport
- Ministry of Housing and Urban Development (Te Tūāpapa Kura Kāinga) 2018–2026, absorbed into the Ministry for Cities, Environment, Regions and Transport
- Ministry of Transport (Te Manatū Waka) 1968–2026, absorbed into the Ministry for Cities, Environment, Regions and Transport
- New Zealand Post Office 1881–1987, dissolved into New Zealand Post Limited, Telecom Corporation of New Zealand Limited, and Post Office Bank Limited
- New Zealand Railways Department (Te Tari Rerewē o Aotearoa) 1880–1982, dissolved into the New Zealand Railways Corporation and private train operating companies
- New Zealand Wildlife Service 1945–1987, merged into the Department of Conservation
- New Zealand Broadcasting Corporation 1960–1975, dissolved into Television One, South Pacific Television, and Radio New Zealand
- New Zealand Forest Service 1919–1987, dissolved into the Department of Conservation, the Forestry Corporation of New Zealand, the Ministry of Agriculture and Forestry, and the New Zealand Forest Research Institute Limited
- New Zealand Institute for Crop and Food Research (Mana Kai Rangahau, a.k.a. Crop & Food)
- New Zealand Productivity Commission (Te Kōmihana Whai Hua o Aotearoa)
- New Zealand Green Investment Finance Limited 1992–Presently in the process of disestablishment
- New Zealand Fast Forward Fund Limited 2008–2009, disestablished
- New Zealand Venture Investment Fund Limited 2002–2019, absorbed into Callaghan Innovation
- New Zealand Fast Forward Limited 2008–2009, disestablished
- New Zealand Food Safety Authority 2002–2010, absorbed into the Ministry of Agriculture and Forestry
- Office of Treaty Settlements (Te Kāhui Whakatau) 1988–2025, merged into Te Tari Whakatau
- Productivity Commission (Te Kōmihana Whai Hua o Aotearoa) 2011–2024, replaced by the Ministry for Regulation
- Pike River Recovery Agency (Te Kāhui Whakamana Rua Tekau mā Iwa) 2018–2022, disestablished
- Solid Energy New Zealand Limited 1987–2018, liquidated
- Social Policy Research and Evaluation Unit 2003–2018, dissolved into the Ministry of Social Development, the Ministry of Justice, and the Social Investment Agency
- Social Security Department 1939–1972, merged into the Department of Social Welfare
- Securities Commission of New Zealand 1978–2011, replaced by the Financial Markets Authority
- State Advances Corporation 1935–1974, merged into Housing New Zealand
- Transfund New Zealand (Arataki Aotearoa) 1996–2004, merged into Land Transport New Zealand
- Traffic Safety Service (Te Manatū Waka) 1968–1992, absorbed into the New Zealand Police
- Te Aka Whai Ora (Māori Health Authority) 2022–2024, disestablished
- Transport Department 1922–1968, merged into the Ministry of Transport
- Terralink NZ Limited, 1996–2001, privatised into Terralink International Limited
- Toi Te Taiao: The Bioethics Council 2002–2009, disestablished
- Transit New Zealand (Ararau Aotearoa) 1989–2008, merged into the New Zealand Transport Agency
- Waterfront Control Commission 1940–1989, disestablished

== See also ==
- Local government in New Zealand
- Constitution of New Zealand
- Hāpai Public (Institute of Public Administration New Zealand)
