= New Zealand Conceptual Framework =

The New Zealand Framework (NZ Framework) is an accounting conceptual framework based on the International Accounting Standards Board (IASB) Framework. It was issued by the Financial Reporting Standards Board (FRSB) of the New Zealand Institute of Chartered Accountants and approved by the Accounting Standards Review Board in [July] 2004 under the Financial Reporting Act 1993. At the time the framework was issued, New Zealand financial reporting standards were sector-neutral. Accordingly, relative to the IASB Framework, the NZ Framework incorporates additional material applicable to public benefit entities.

The NZ Framework outlines the concepts which underpin information presented in general purpose financial statements, and in non-financial information which is included in or accompanies the financial statements. It is used by the FRSB in working with the IASB to develop International Financial Reporting Standards (IFRS) or in developing local Financial Reporting Standards (FRS). It may also be used by various parties to the financial reporting process (e.g., preparers, auditors, etc.) as a basis for the application of judgment in resolving accounting issues.
