= McLeod Bay =

McLeod Bay may refer to:

- A bay on the Great Slave Lake in the Northwest Territories, Canada
- A bay to the west of Whangārei Heads in Northland, New Zealand
