= Hāpai Public =

- President: Jo Cribb
- Staff: 5
- Formerly called: Institute of Public Administration New Zealand
- Address: Level 3, Rutherford House, Pipitea Campus, Victoria University, Wellington
- Location: Wellington, New Zealand
- Website: hapaipublic.org.nz

Hāpai Public, formerly the Institute of Public Administration New Zealand (IPANZ), is a voluntary public administration organisation. IPANZ states their goal is:

promoting improvements in public policy and in administration and management in the public sector in New Zealand, and to increasing public understanding of the work undertaken in the public sector.

Hāpai Public publishes a quarterly journal called Public Sector and run annual awards for the New Zealand public sector called the IPANZ GEN-I Public Sector Excellence Awards.

== History ==
The "Public Service Administration Society" originated in Christchurch in 1934. Similar societies subsequently established (in Wellington, Auckland and Dunedin) then merged in 1936 to form the New Zealand Institute of Public Administration. In 2024, the organization's name was changed to Hāpai Public.
