= Outdoor Access Commission =

New Zealand crown entity

- Herenga ā Nuku Aotearoa (Māori)

Agency overview
- Formed: 29 September 2008
- Headquarters: Wellington, New Zealand
- Employees: 12 to 14 (varies)
- Annual budget: NZ$3.6 million
- Minister responsible: Todd McClay, Minister of Agriculture
- Agency executives: Don Cameron, Chairperson; Dan Wildy, Chief Executive
- Parent agency: Ministry for Primary Industries
- Website: www.herengaanuku.govt.nz

The Outdoor Access Commission - Herenga ā Nuku Aotearoa, formerly the New Zealand Walking Access Commission (Māori: Ara Hīkoi Aotearoa), is a crown agent that helps to negotiate, establish, maintain, and improve public access to the outdoors. It works with other agencies, local groups and communities to create and tend to tracks and trails.

Much of the commission's work is helping to resolve disputes over access to land or negotiating new access.

Although it is called the Walking Access Commission it also works on public access to the outdoors for other outdoor users including mountain bikers, anglers, hunters, horse riders, trail runners, climbers and landowners. The commission administers a national strategy on outdoor access. It develops and shares maps of outdoor access. It provides these maps and other information to the public, and it educates about people's public access rights and responsibilities in the outdoors.

The commission has a small staff in Wellington and a network of regional field advisers located around the country. It is governed by an independent board of five members appointed by the minister.

The commission's functions are described in the Walking Access Act 2008.

Recent developments

New topographic basemap for pocket maps app (May 2024):

In May 2024, Herenga ā Nuku Aotearoa released a comprehensive topographic basemap for its Pocket Maps application. This enhancement allows users to access detailed terrain information offline, combining public access data with topographic features such as contours, rivers, roads, and landcover classifications. The basemap integrates data from the Department of Conservation and the New Zealand Geographic Board, improving navigation for outdoor enthusiasts in areas without mobile reception.

Addition of 3,000 hectares to public access maps (September 2023):

In September 2023, the Commission added over 1,400 reserves, totaling 3,000 hectares, to its public access maps. This expansion enhances the visibility of publicly accessible lands, aiding in the promotion of outdoor activities and ensuring better public awareness of available recreational areas.

== See also ==
- Public sector organisations in New Zealand
