= Border Executive Board =

Government board in New Zealand

The Border Executive Board is an interdepartmental executive board within the New Zealand public service. It coordinates government activity at the New Zealand border across six public service departments.

== Purpose and membership ==
The purpose of the Border Executive Board is to deliver an integrated and effective border system. As of 2025, its role is to:

- address gaps in end-to-end border processes,
- ensure risks from people, goods, and craft arriving and departing the border are addressed, and
- make strategic improvements to the border.

The members of the board are the chief executives from the Ministry of Business, Innovation, and Employment (which includes Immigration New Zealand), the Ministry of Foreign Affairs and Trade, the Ministry of Health, the Ministry for Primary Industries (which includes Biosecurity New Zealand), the Ministry of Transport, and the New Zealand Customs Service.

The board is hosted by the New Zealand Customs Service and funded by the Border System Performance appropriation within Vote Customs. Participating agencies have responsibility for work programmes that fall within their existing functions. The board has collective responsibility, with accountability to the minister responsible for the Border Executive Board, for planning and responses in areas where protection does not fall under the traditional remit of a specific border agency. The Comptroller of Customs chairs the board and employs an executive director to manage the board secretariat.

== History ==
The Public Service Act 2020 provides for the establishment of interdepartmental executive boards, which are groupings of public service chief executives intended to align strategy, policy, operations, and budgeting around a shared issue. The Border Executive Board was established in January 2021 following Cabinet decisions made in December 2020. It is a formal successor to an informal border governance group, which was established in 2007 and comprised senior leaders from the Customs service and the primary industries, transport, and business ministries.

The context for establishing the board was the ongoing COVID-19 pandemic and decisions of the New Zealand government to use border controls as the primary measure at limiting COVID-19 transmission in the community. Since 2023 the board has developed a Border Sector Strategy which aims to implement a digital arrival card, to streamline travel and trade between New Zealand and Australia, and to support demand at the air and maritime border.

== Projects ==
=== Future Borders Sprint Project ===
In 2021, the Future Borders Sprint project joined New Zealand's aviation sector and government agencies to propose safe and scalable border processes during COVID-19. It was led by Auckland International Airport Limited's chief executive and the Border Executive Board's chair.

=== The New Zealand Traveller Declaration (NZTD) ===
Launched on 25 March 2022 to manage COVID-19 health responses, the NZTD faced resource constraints but adapted with over 30 updates until its temporary pause in October 2022. Designed as a digital risk management tool, it aimed to swiftly adjust to future border changes, enhancing operational efficiency and sustainability.

=== Maritime Border Programme ===
The Board identified a gap in the Reconnecting New Zealanders initiative focused on air travel and extended its scope to include the maritime border, collaborating with Maritime New Zealand and other agencies. Their efforts managed COVID-19 impacts on maritime supply chains, leading to the successful reopening of maritime pathways by July 2022 and the implementation of the adaptable Vessel Management Framework by November 2022.

== Responsible minister ==
Since 1 February 2023 responsibility for the Border Executive Board has been vested in the Minister of Customs.

Key

Labour National NZ First

No.	Name	Portrait	Term of office		Concurrent office	Prime Minister
1	Chris Hipkins		11 January 2021	14 June 2022	Minister for COVID-19 Response	Ardern
2	Ayesha Verrall		14 June 2022	1 February 2023	Minister for COVID-19 Response	Ardern
3	Meka Whaitiri		1 February 2023	3 May 2023	Minister of Customs	Hipkins
–	Damien O'Connor		3 May 2023	8 May 2023	Acting Minister of Customs	Hipkins
4	Jo Luxton		8 May 2023	27 November 2023	Minister of Customs	Hipkins
5	Casey Costello		27 November 2023	present	Minister of Customs	Luxon
