= Mount Manaia =

Volcanic mountain in New Zealand

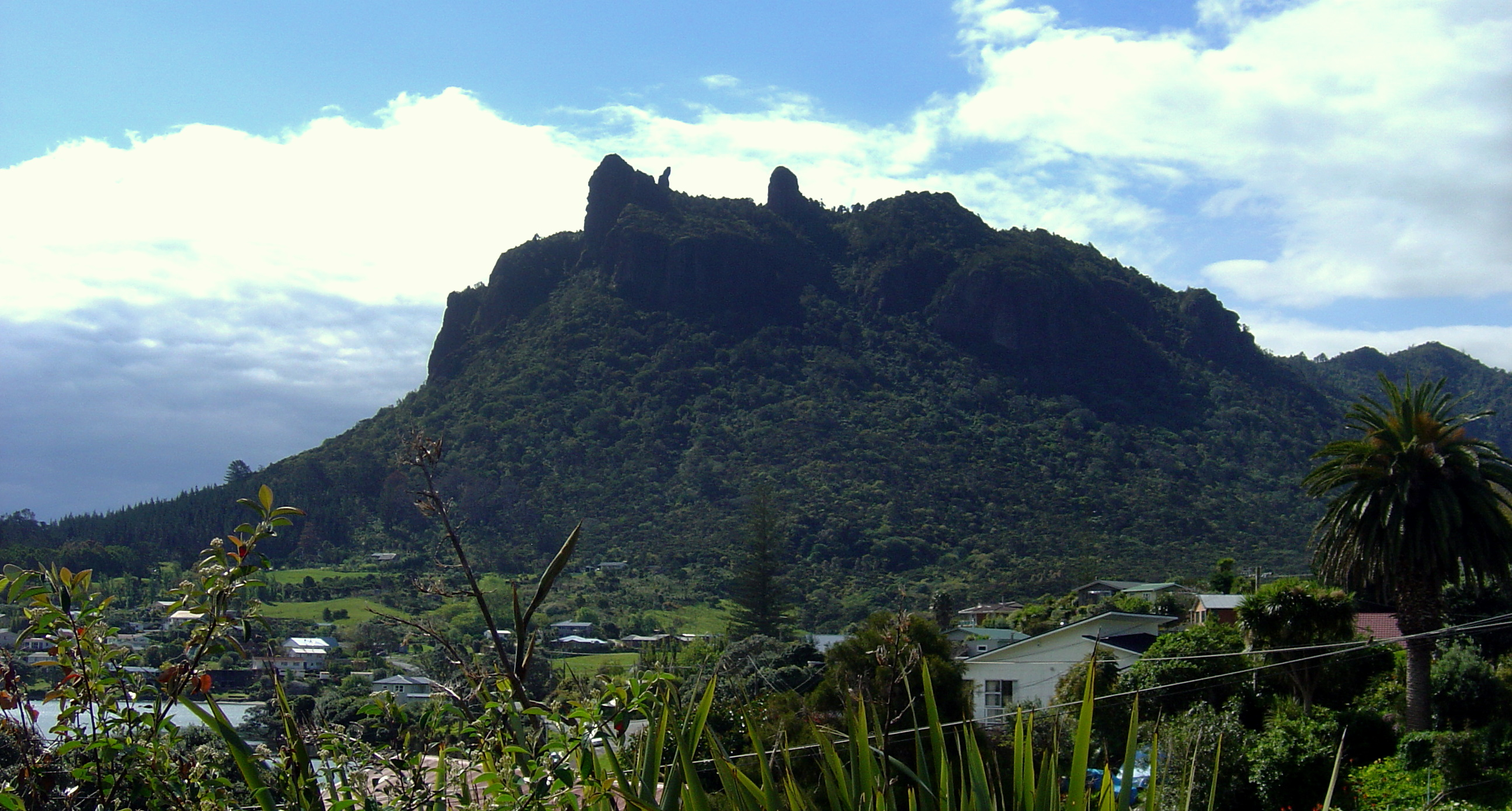
- Mt Manaia viewed from coastal Taurikura

Highest point
- Elevation: 420 m (1,380 ft)
- Isolation: 6.67 km (4.14 mi)
- Coordinates: 35°49.05′S 174°30.58′E

Naming
- Native name: Manaia (Māori)

Geography
- Location within Northland Region
- Location: Whangarei District, Northland Region, New Zealand

Climbing
- Easiest route: Mount Manaia Track

Mount Manaia is a dominant landmark approximately 30 kilometres (19 mi) southeast of Whangārei city on the Whangārei Heads peninsula.

Standing 420 metres, the summit offers outstanding views of the Marsden Point Oil Refinery, Bream Bay and the Hauraki Gulf to the south, Whangārei Harbour to the west and the Poor Knights Islands and Northland coast to the north.

Surface volcanics centered upon Mount Manaia with andesite in red shading and dacite in purple shading. The approximate Taurikura volcanic complex is in white shading. Clicking on the map enlarges it, and enables panning and mouseover of volcanic feature name/wikilink and ages before present. The key to the other volcanics that are shown with panning is basalt - brown, monogenic basalts - dark brown, undifferentiated basalts of the Tangihua Complex in Northland Allochthon - light brown, arc basalts - deep orange brown, arc ring basalts -orange brown, rhyolite - violet, basaltic andesite`- light red), ignimbrite (lighter shades of violet), and plutonic - gray.

Mt Manaia - along with Mt Lion, Bream Head and the Hen and Chicken Islands, are the scattered remnants of andesite, volcanic intrusions that erupted with force 16 to 22 million years ago during the early Miocene. They are part of a 50 km^{2} (19 sq mi) stratovolcano that extended to the Hen and Chickens. Its jagged outline is similar to that of its neighbours and other volcanic outcrops in Northland that erupted in a similar period.

Today blanketed by native bush, Manaia's jagged peaks and steep bluffs are protected within a Department of Conservation reserve which features a well-maintained 1½ hour track to the summit.

== Photo gallery ==
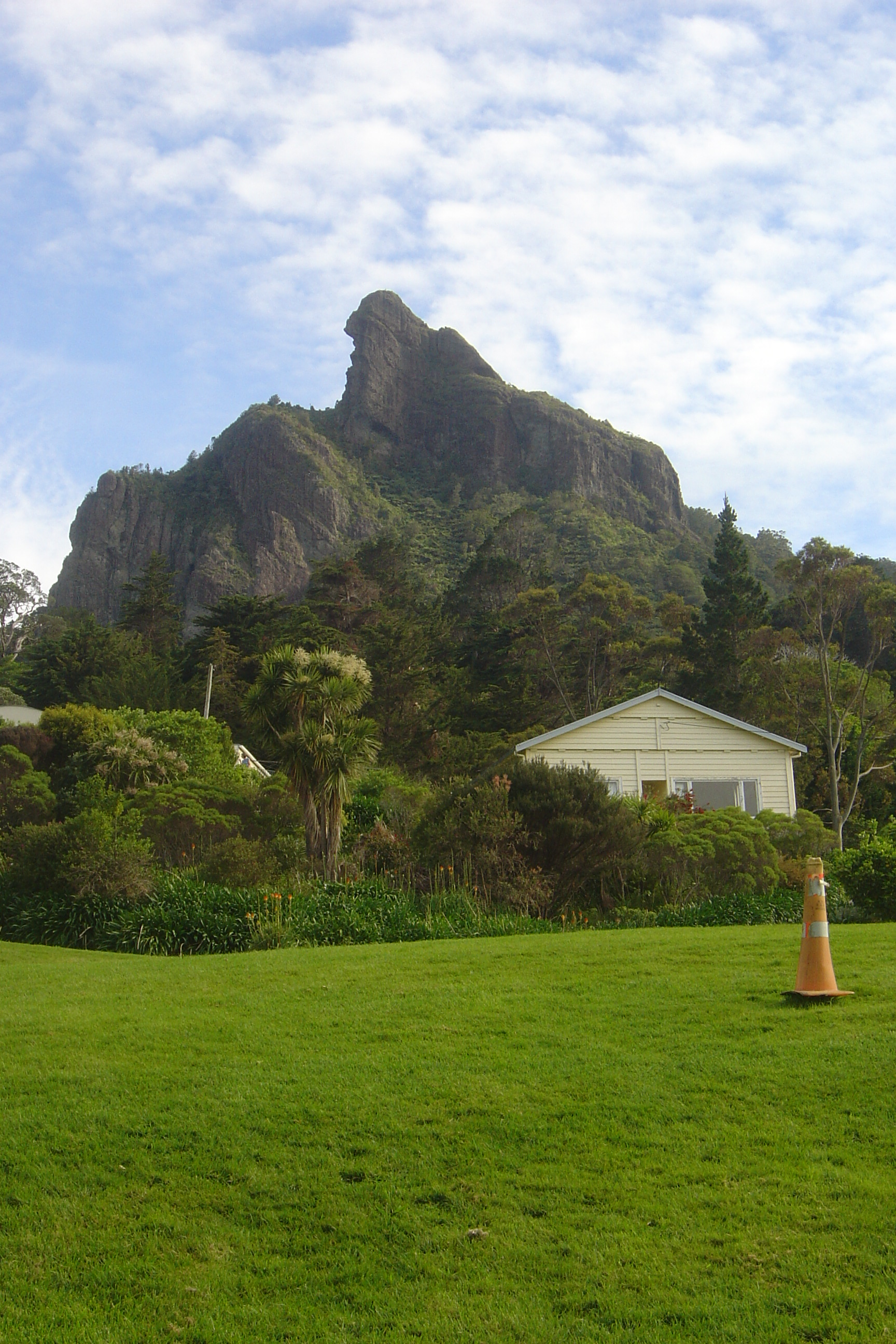
Mt Manaia viewed from Manaia Baptist Camp at Taurikura

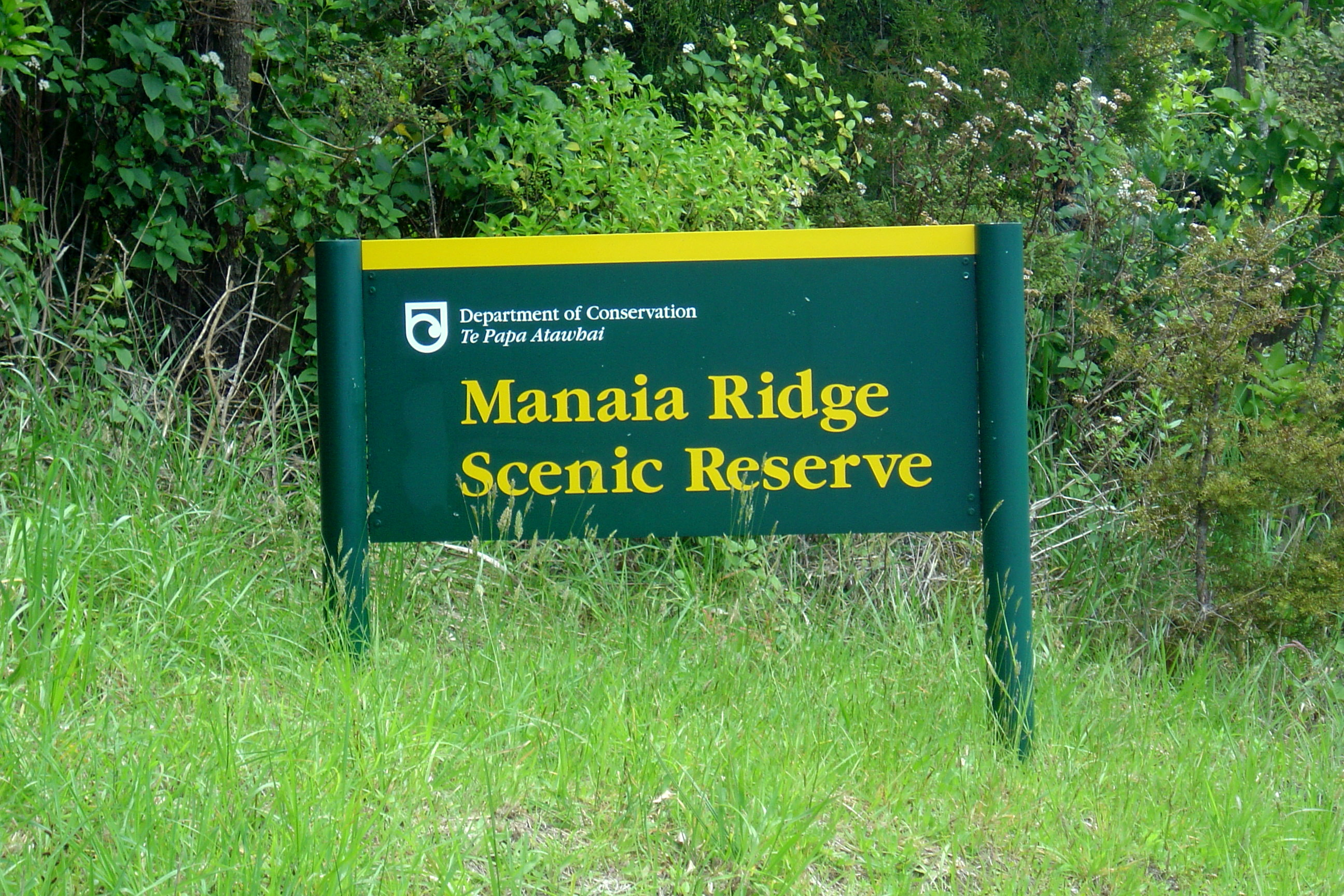
Manaia Ridge Scenic Reserve

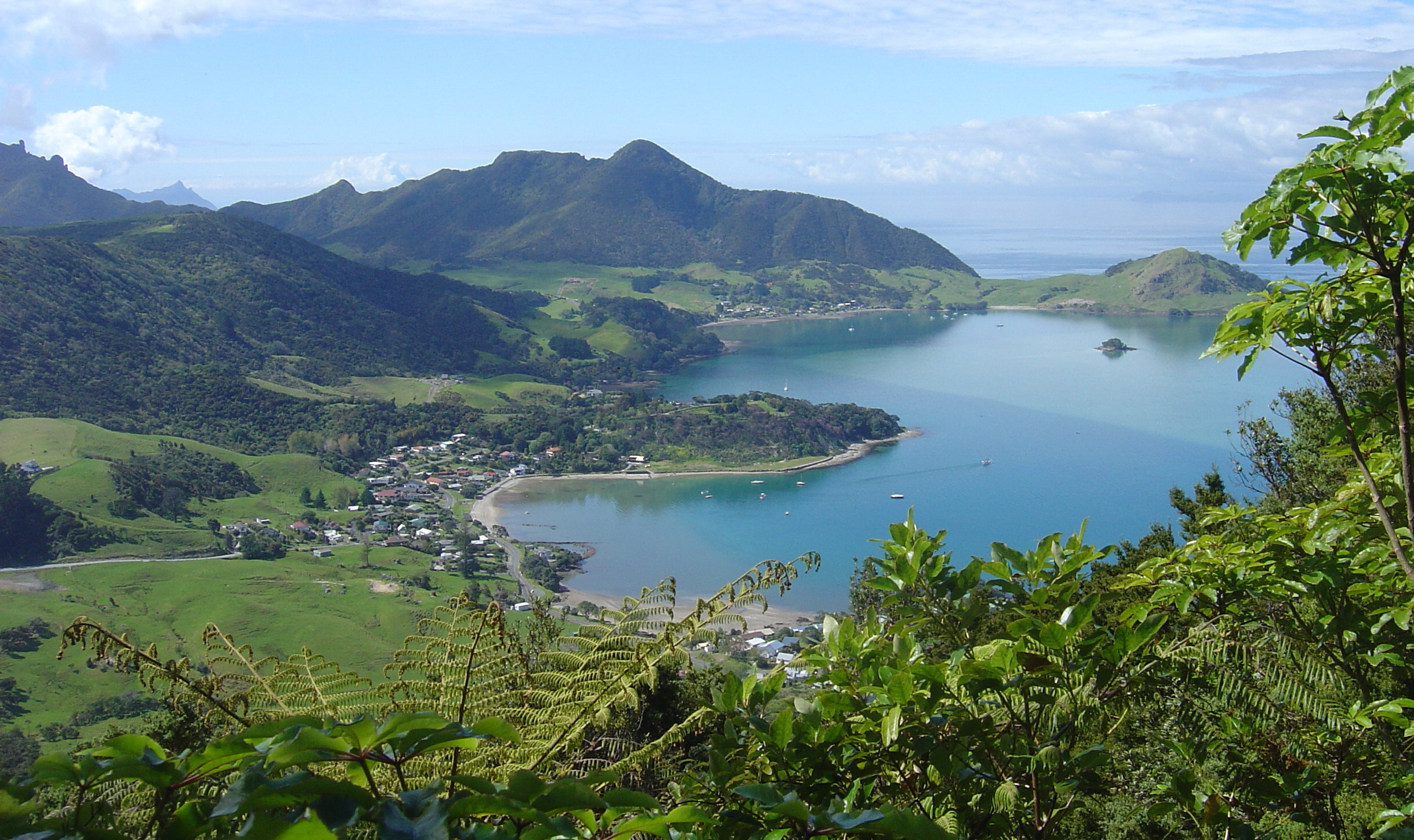
Mt Lion and Taurikura viewed from the flanks of Mt Manaia

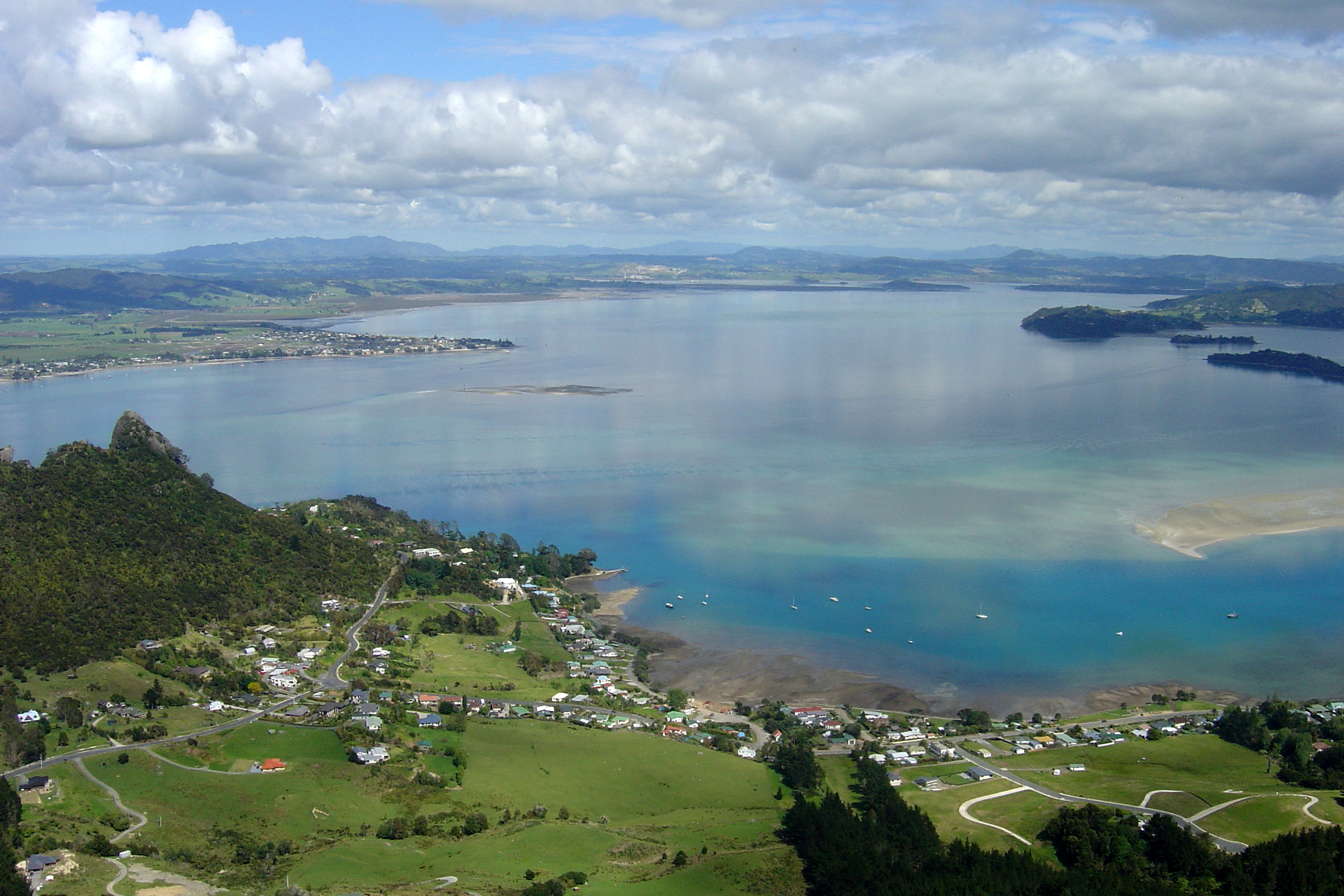
Whangārei Harbour viewed from the summit

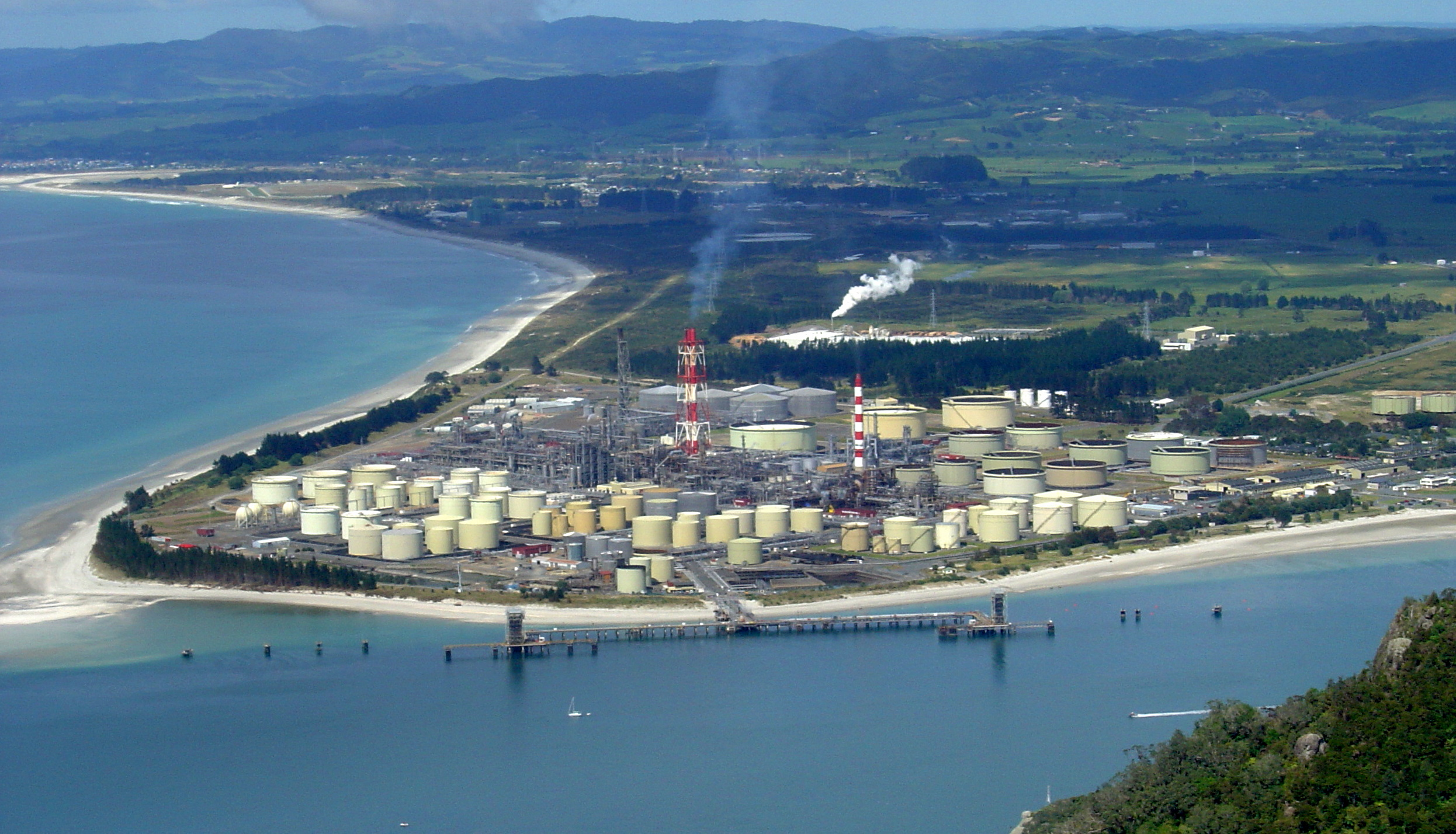
Looking down at the Marsden Point Oil Refinery from across Whangārei Harbour

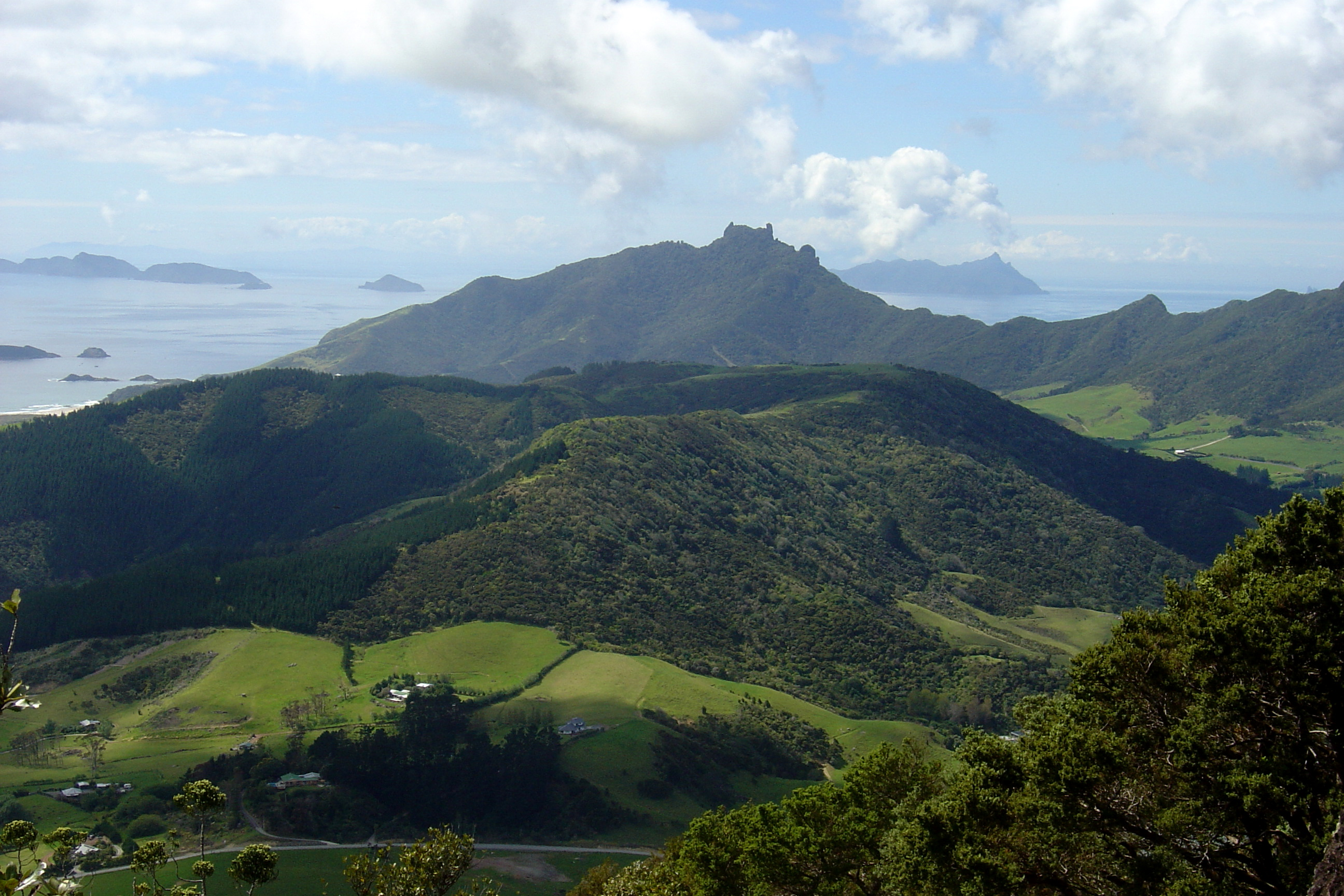
Bream Head and the Bream Islands viewed from atop the summit

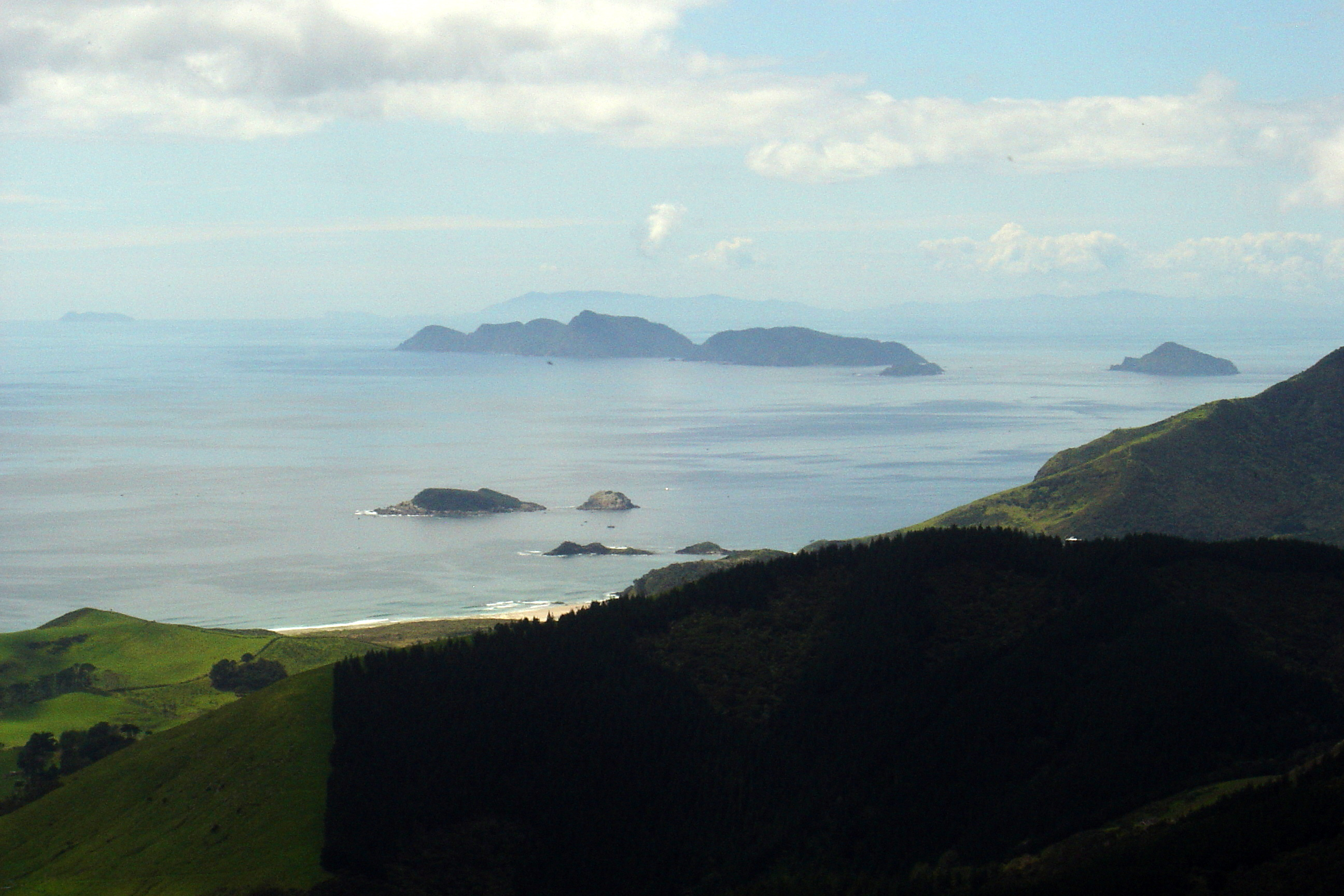
The Bream Islands with Great Barrier Island in the distance viewed from Mt Manaia

== Sources ==
- Geological Society of New Zealand Annual Conference, 2-5 December 2002
- Te Ara Encyclopedia of New Zealand
- Northland Naturally, Mt Manaia web page
