= Taurikura =

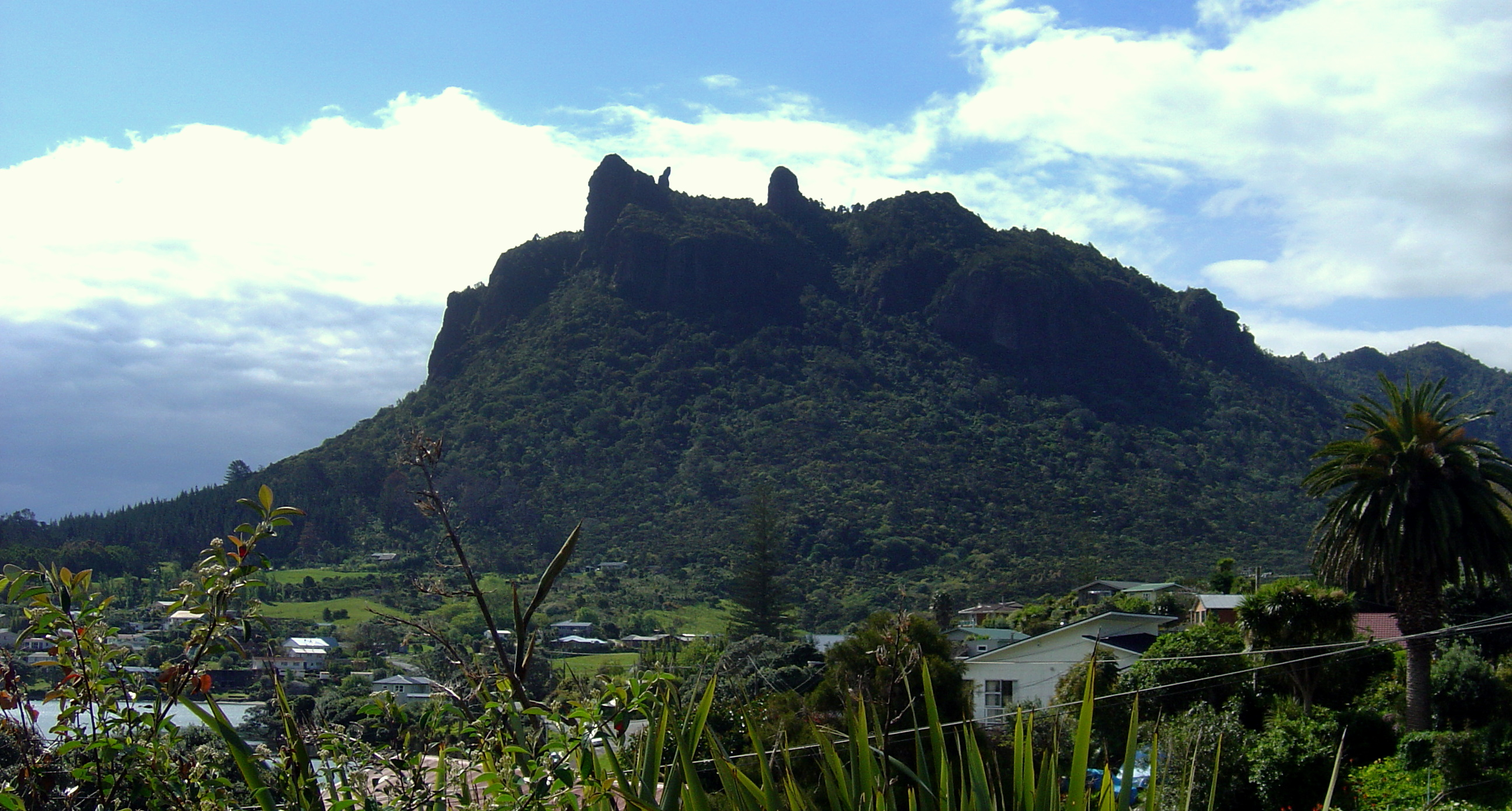
- Mount Manaia viewed from the harbour coastline of Taurikura

- Location within Northland Region
- Coordinates: 35°49.36′S 174°31.40′E
- Country: New Zealand
- Region: Northland Region
- District: Whangarei District

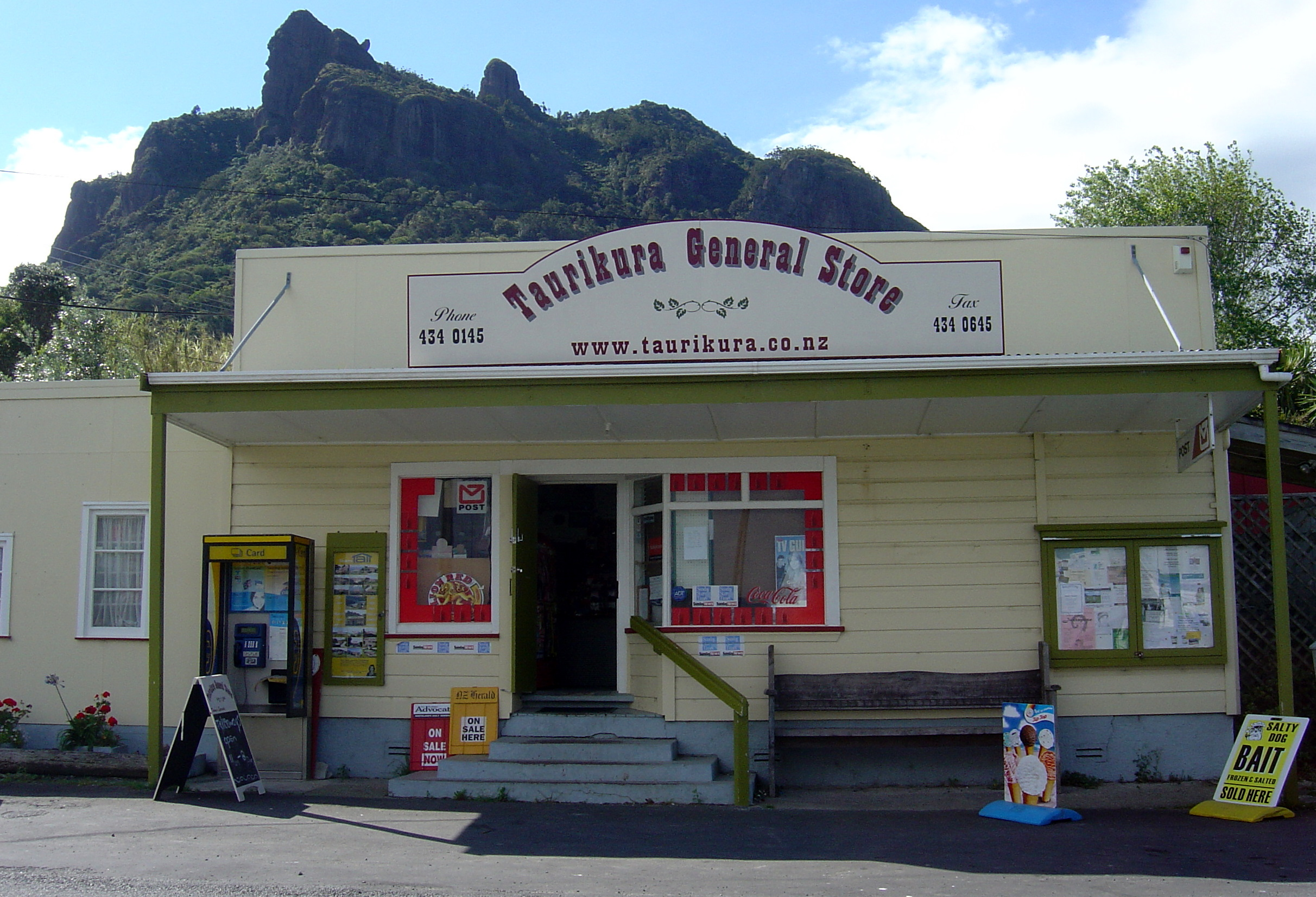
Taurikura General Store and Mt Manaia

Taurikura is a small, rural township in the Whangarei District, approximately 30 kilometres (19 mi) south east of Whangārei city in Northland, New Zealand. The town is located on the shores of Calliope Bay at the base of 420-metre-high (1,380 ft) Mount Manaia which, along with Bream Head and the Hen Island, collectively form the ancient remnants of a very large andesitic volcano.

Features of Taurikura include a Baptist-owned camp and a permanently closed general store. The local school, Whangarei Heads School, is the second oldest school in New Zealand still operating on its original site. The town offers a range of views of the Marsden Point Oil Refinery located on the opposite shore of Whangārei Harbour. A number of ocean beaches are also a short drive away.
