= New Zealand Institute of Chartered Accountants =

- Abbreviation: NZICA
- Successor: Chartered Accountants Australia and New Zealand
- Formation: 1909; 117 years ago
- Dissolved: 31 December 2014; 11 years ago
- Headquarters: Wellington, New Zealand
- Region served: New Zealand
- Members: > 32,000
- President: Ross Jackson
- Vice president: Richard Austin
- Website: www.nzica.com
- Formerly called: New Zealand Society of Accountants

The New Zealand Institute of Chartered Accountants (NZICA), originally known as the New Zealand Society of Accountants, was formed in 1909. The Institute represented over 32,000 members in New Zealand and overseas. Most accountants in New Zealand belonged to the institute.

In November 2013, members of the Institute of Chartered Accountants Australia (ICAA) and the NZICA accepted a proposal to create a single combined institute. NZICA and the ICAA amalgamated to become Chartered Accountants Australia and New Zealand (CAANZ) in 2014.

== Structure ==
There are three "Colleges" or membership groupings within the institute.

=== Chartered Accountants ===
The Chartered Accountant designation denotes an accountant who has completed the CAANZ programme including the exams and practical components and is a full member of the institute. Members who complete a further examination and gain practical experience are qualified to offer accountancy services to the public. Members of the CA College term themselves Chartered Accountants and use the designatory letters CA.

=== Associate Chartered Accountants ===
Members of the Associate Chartered Accountant College use the designatory letters ACA.

The Associate Chartered Accountant designation is a mid-level qualification. Members of the ACA College must complete professional education requirements but are not entitled to offer service to the public.

=== Accounting Technicians ===
NZICA includes among its members persons qualified at accounting technician level who belong to the College of Accounting Technicians and may use the designatory letters AT.

== Mutual recognition agreements ==
The institute has mutual recognition agreements with the following Institutes:

- Canadian Institute of Chartered Accountants
- Institute of Chartered Accountants of Australia
- Institute of Chartered Accountants in England and Wales
- Hong Kong Institute of Certified Public Accountants
- Institute of Chartered Accountants in Ireland
- Institute of Chartered Accountants of Scotland
- South African Institute of Chartered Accountants
- American Institute of Certified Public Accountants

NZICA members may admit to full memberships of the above institutions after passing an aptitude test or subject to other specific requirements (as per regulations).

Membership of NZICA through a mutual recognition agreement is subject to meeting certain criteria, including knowledge of New Zealand tax and law.

Members of the following professional associations are given limited advanced standing by NZICA:

- Association of Chartered Certified Accountants (ACCA) Exemptions to ACCA have been removed altogether.
- CPA Australia
- Institute of Chartered Accountants of India

NZICA terminated mutual recognition agreements with ACCA and CPA Australia in 2003.

Members of the Association of Accounting Technicians may obtain advanced standing for membership of the College of Accounting Technicians.

== Fellowship ==
Fellowship, or senior membership, of NZICA may be awarded to a member of the CA College for service to the institute, or high achievement in the profession.

== Public practice ==
Members of the College of Chartered Accountants may apply for a Certificate of Public Practice. Every member of the New Zealand Institute of Chartered Accountants who offers accounting services to the public must be a Chartered Accountant and hold a Certificate of Public Practice (CPP). The requirements for the issuing of this certificate are that (amongst others) a member must have had two years of acceptable practical experience while a member of the College of Chartered Accountants and have attended a course for new practitioners.

== History ==
=== Accounting in New Zealand – Timeline ===
- 1894 – Incorporated Institute of Accountants of New Zealand
- 1898 – New Zealand Accountants' and Auditors' Association [based in Auckland and had female members at the time of the formation of the Society in 1908. Early minutes are held in offsite storage. Auckland Branch have details.]
- 1908 – New Zealand Society of Accountants Act (sponsored by both the above bodies). Established the Society with the purpose "to control and regulate the practice of the profession of accountancy in New Zealand." Note that there is a copy of the Act in the Library's archive of Institute and Society publications.
  - The new Act became law on 15 September of that year with Peter Barr, one of the earliest advocates of unity of the profession in New Zealand, as the society's first president. Note: the Bill was introduced by Premier, Sir Joseph Ward, himself an accountant.
- 1909 – First members admitted in 1909. Member no. 1 George Abercrombie.
  - There is an entry for Peter Barr, the Society's first president, in the Dictionary of NZ Biography. Early in 1909, advertisements appeared in the national press inviting applications for admission to the Society for those with the qualifications set out in the Act.
  - On 7 December the Board delivered a letter to the first meeting of the Council sitting in the Chamber of Commerce Hall. A copy of this letter is on p. 26 of Graham's 'First Fifty Years.'
- 1910 – Had reached agreement with the University of New Zealand for the subjects on its education syllabus to be included in the new Bachelor of Commerce degree.
- 1922 – Society establishes The Accountants Journal (TAJ).
- 1933 – Companies Act 1933 restricts the appointment of company auditors to members of the Society.
  - There was no regulation of corporate financial reporting by the Society prior to World War II. Reporting was largely open to individual interpretation as the Companies Acts of 1903, 1908 and 1933 imposed only "lightweight external regulation" (Keenan, 2000, p. 97).
- 1944 – New Zealand Institute of Cost Accountants founded. Affiliated with the NZSA in 1960; in 1966 it ceased to exist, with its activities being assumed by the NZSA.
- 1946 – Council of the NZSA adopted seven of the ten recommendations on accounting principles issued by ICAEW. These were issued to members in a booklet titled Recommendations on Accounting Principles (NZSA, 1946).
- 1948 – British Companies Act 1948 "prefigured a new and more onerous external regulation of corporate financial reporting in New Zealand"
- 1950 – Accounting Practice and Procedure Committee (APPC).
  - Its functions were to "make pronouncements for the guidance of members" and "give evidence on behalf of the Society before various [Government] committees" (TAJ, August 1950, p. 271, Cited in Keenan, 2000, p. 98). The committee's first two meetings discussed the development of accounting and auditing standards, and revisions to Recommendations on Accounting Principles. This however stalled and fell off the agenda. Keenan (2000) suggests that this was due to poor resourcing of the APPC as well as contention over the respective strengths of a collegiate vs individual approach to regulation.
  - Also in 1950 the NZ Accountants' and Auditors' Association merged with the Society.
- 1955 – Companies Act 1955
- 1958 – New Zealand Society of Accountants Act 1958. Contained provision authorizing Society to "regulate the practice of the profession" in NZ. This was seen as grounds for the Society to establish accounting and auditing standards (Zeff, 1979, p. 1).
- 1959–60 – University of New Zealand establishes chairs of accounting at each of its four main colleges.
- 1961 – APPC replaced by the Board of Research and Publications (BRAP). Contained mixed membership of academics and practitioners.
- 1962 – May 1962 the BRAP approved commencement of a long-term project entitled Recommendations on Standards of Best Accounting Practice (TAJ, July 1962, p. 374, cited in Keenan, 2000, p. 100).
- 1964 – 1969

BRAP released eight Tentative Statements on Accounting and Auditing Practice. The preamble to each Tentative Statement explained that statements issued in sequel to these would not be mandatory in any way. This highlights the continued predominance of individual over collegial regulation (Keenan states eight but Bradbury only mentions four).

- 1964 – The first of the eight Tentative Statements, Presentation of Balance Sheet and Profit and Loss, was published in October 1964.
  - This statement was the first official recommendation on an accounting standard that was not a transcription or pure adaptation of an English Institute Recommendation (Bradbury, 1999, p. 7).
  - Note: The first Tentative Statements on Auditing appeared in October and November 1964.
- 1966 – At the AGM of the NZ Institute of Cost Accountants held on 17 May 1966, it was resolved to wind up the Institute and transfer the funds and property remaining at 30 June 1966 to the NZSA. As part of the agreement, members of the institute, at the date of winding up, would become members of the newly formed Cost and Management Accounting Division of the NZSA. [see CMA section for full details]
- 1966 – Second tentative statement on deferred tax issued in October 1966. This adopted a position closer to the US's Accounting Research Bulletin No 44.
- 1966 – First Statement on Accounting Practice released in September 1966 by BRAP.
- 1967 – BRAP recommendations on various measures to encourage compliance with generally accepted accounting principles and standards. Zeff (1979, p. 43) suggests that the Board may have been influenced by recent granting of authority by the Council of the AICPA to its Accounting Principles Board.
- 1968 – Editorial in TAJ entitled "Improving Accounting Standards" gave strong support to requiring members' compliance with collegiate regulation. The editorial uses the threat of external enforced regulation by suggesting that a failure to enforce compliance will result in the widening of the role of the Registrar of Companies, or the creation of an independent organisation such as the US S.E.C.
- 1969 – Council accepts BRAP proposal due process.

Proposed due process: A Statement, after being exposed as a Tentative Statement and revised, if necessary, by the BRAP, would be submitted to Council for consideration. Council could refer back to the BRAP. Council could pronounce, within twelve months of receipt, that the Statement was required (mandatory), or recommended (voluntary), or that the Statement be approved for publication without comment.

- 1970 – 1973 Above proposal comes into force.

Three more Tentative Statements issued. Most significant was the Tentative Statement on Auditing Practice No.5: Auditing Standards.

- 1972 – The Incorporated Institute of Accountants of New Zealand wound up its affairs and transferred its funds to the NZSA. The Society was now the only national organization in the field.
- 1973 – Council (NZSA) established a Professional Standards Committee to issue Statements of Standard Accounting Practice. Supersedes BRAP (?).
- 1973 – Formation of International Accounting Standards Committee (IASC) in June 1973.
- 1974 – Council approves Standard 7: Auditing Practice. This attempts to enforce adoption of financial reporting statements by linking compliance to Statements on Accounting Practice in the preparation of company accounts to a standard of auditing practice. For although not all company directors were members of the NZSA, creating a gap in the mandatory regime, all company auditors were members of the NZSA. Departures from the standards were to be referred to in the audit report and, where appropriate, result in a qualified opinion. The standards still did not have legal backing, however. This didn't come until 1993 with the passing of the Financial Reporting Act 1993.
- 1974 – NZSA became associate member of the IASC. Required NZSA to distribute IASC exposure drafts and transmit comments back to the IASC. See Bradbury (1999, p. 7) for a comparative table of the first ten standards issued by the ARSB and IASC.
- 1989 – July 1989 the Public Finance Act passed. Requires Crown government departments and Crown agencies to prepare financial statements in accordance with GAAP and have them audited. Similar requirements placed on local authorities in the same year. [source: CAJ, July 2004, p. 26]
- 1990 – 2 NZSA's Accounting Research and Standards Board issues seven exposure drafts which together comprised a proposed conceptual framework for financial reporting in NZ [A Proposed Framework for Financial Reporting in New Zealand, December 1991]. This framework proposed a set of concepts intended to apply to all sectors, i.e. sector neutral.
  - The framework drew on the Australian (AARF) and US (FASB) conceptual frameworks and also corresponds with IASC framework. See Hooper et al. (1999, Ch. 7) or Mathews & Perera (1996, Ch.6) for further detail.
- 1993 – Statement of Concepts for General Purpose Financial Reporting to cover all general purpose financial reports from 1 January 1995.
- 1993 – The Financial Reporting Act 1993 established the Accounting Standards Review Board (ASRB) to approve FRSs. Provides overt legislative backing to financial reporting standards.
  - The council of the NZSA appoints the Financial Reporting Standards Board (FRSB) to coordinate the development of financial reporting standards (FRSs), formerly known as statements of standard accounting practice (SSAPs).
  - Generally accepted accounting practice (GAAP) in NZ is defined by all FRSs and SSAPs on issue. These FRSs and SSAPs are to be issued by the FRSB of the Society of Accountants and then approved by the ASRB under the Financial Reporting Act 1993, which effectively gives them legal backing.
- 1994 – Fiscal Responsibility Act 1994. Reinforces requirement on central government to use GAAP.
- 1996 – Institute of Chartered Accountants of New Zealand Act 1996
- 1997 – FRSB decides to pursue policy of international harmonization.
- 1999 – In May the first two exposure drafts based on IASB pronouncements are issued (EDs 86 and 87).
- 2001 – International Accounting Standards Board (IASB) assumed responsibility (from the IASC) for setting accounting standards and designated International Financial Reporting Standards on 1 April 2001.
- 2002 – Financial Reporting Council (FRC) in Australia announces that from January 2005 international accounting standards would be adopted in Australia.
  - October 2002 – Accounting Standards Review Board (ASRB) recommends to NZ government that listed issuers should comply from January 2007, with the option to adopt in January 2005. Samkin (2005, p. 9) notes:
  - This recommendation departs from that made by the FRSB in ED-92, issued in June 2002, to the effect that financial reporting standards would be developed from international standards and that departures from these would only be made in rare and exceptional circumstances. No departures would now be permitted.
  - December 2002 – ASRB announced that for periods commencing on or after 1 January 2007, New Zealand reporting entities would be required to apply International Financial Reporting Standards (IFRS) in the preparation of their external financial reports. However, entities would have the option to adopt IFRS early from 1 January 2005.
  - New standards will apply to all general purpose financial reports, defined as: reports intended to provide information to meet the needs of those external users who are unable to require, or contract for, the preparation of special reports to meet their specific information needs.
- 2004 – 24 November the Accounting Standards Review Board approved the stable platform of New Zealand Equivalents to International Financial Reporting Standards (NZ IFRS).
- 2005 – Voluntary adoption of NZ IFRS from 1 January. It appears that in the main only larger listed companies have taken the opportunity to adopt early.
- 2005 – The Institute of Chartered Accountants began operating as the New Zealand Institute of Chartered Accountants in August 2005.
- 2007 – January 2007 NZ IFRS take mandatory effect for periods beginning on or after 1 January. NZ IFRS replaces the FRSs and SSAPs that defined pre-2007 GAAP.

== Institute of Cost Accountants ==
At the AGM of the NZ Institute of Cost Accountants held on 17 May 1966, it was resolved to wind up the Institute and transfer the funds and property remaining at 30 June 1966 to the NZSA. As part of the agreement, members of the institute, at the date of winding up, would become members of the newly formed Cost and Management Accounting Division of the NZSA.

Following considerable debate over the preceding two years, this CMA Division was wound up and a National Corporate Sector Committee established in June 1988. It was noted in the Accountants Journal of May 1988 that: "Members of the CMA Division will be entitled to use the CMA designation as long as they are members of the Society".

1. The rules passed in 1996 when the NZSA became the Institute of Chartered Accountants of New Zealand allowed for three designations – CA, ACA and AT. There does not appear to be any reference to CMA.

It would appear from this that former members of the Institute of Cost Accountants are now regular members of the New Zealand Institute of Chartered Accountants.

== Financial Reporting Standards Board ==
Financial Reporting Standards Board (FRSB) is a board of New Zealand Institute of Chartered Accountants. Its objective is to develop, revise and maintain definite accounting standards and providing guidance through research bulletins or technical practice aids in all aspects of financial reporting. FRSB forwards new accounting standards to the Accounting Standards Review Board (ASRB) for approval. It also works with the International Accounting Standards Board (IASB).

== Bibliography ==
- Accounting. In Encyclopedia of NZ (1966).
- Bradbury, Michael. (1999). "Harmonizing with overseas accounting standards.", Chartered Accountants Journal, July, pp. 5–11.
- Bradbury, Michael & van Zijl, Tony. (1995). "Shifting to IFRS." University of Auckland Business Review, 7 (1), pp. 77–83
- Dictionary of NZ Biography There is an entry for Peter Barr, the Society's first president, in the Dictionary of NZ Biography.
- Fisher, Craig. NZ IFRS and GAAP – Part 1. Accounting, Corporate and Tax Alert. 2006. Issue 381. p. 7.
- Graham, Alan W. (1960). The first fifty years 1909–1959. New Zealand Society of Accountants. Wellington, NZ.
- Hooper et al. (1999). Accounting theory: Issues for New Zealand accountants.
- Keenan, Michael G. (November 2000). "Between anarchy and authority." Accounting History, 5 (2).
- Mathews, M. R. & Perera, M. H. B. (1996). Accounting theory and development. 3rd ed. Chapter 6.
- NZSA. (1946). Recommendations on Accounting Principles. NZSA Council.
- NZSA Year books in Reference Collection (011.6 YEA)
- Tsuji, Atsuo & Garner, Paul (eds). (1995). Studies in Accounting History: Tradition and Innovation for the Twenty-First Century.
- Zeff, Stephen A. (1979). Forging accounting principles in New Zealand. Dept. of Accounting, Victoria University of Wellington.
