= Plumbers, Gasfitters and Drainlayers Board =

Government body in New Zealand

The New Zealand Plumbers, Gasfitters and Drainlayers Board is a New Zealand government body responsible for licensing and standards in the plumbing and gasfitting industry. Originally constituted under the Plumbers and Gasfitters Registration Act 1964, it is currently constituted under the Plumbers Gasfitters and Drainlayers Act 2006.

The Board has all the rights, duties, responsibilities and obligations necessary for the registration of plumbers, gasfitters and drainlayers for the purpose of improving, promoting and protecting the public health, especially in the matter of sanitary plumbing, gasfitting and drainlaying. The services performed by these occupations are considered to have a direct effect on the integrity of public network utilities supplying drinking water, stormwater collection and disposal, foul sewage handling and disposal and the gas supply to which they are directly interconnected. The occupations are also relevant to the environment particularly the contamination and pollution of the air, water, the ground and including noise.
