= Valuer-General of New Zealand =

New Zealand statutory valuation official

- Incumbent; Neill Sullivan
- Land Information New Zealand
- Member of: Valuers Registration Board
- Constituting instrument: Government Valuation of Land Act 1896; Valuers Act 1948
- Formation: 1896
- Website: https://valuersregistrationboard.org.nz/

The Valuer-General of New Zealand is a statutory officer in charge of valuation standards in New Zealand.

The Valuer-General is the chair of the Valuers Registration Board which is a body administered by Land Information New Zealand. The Valuer-General a part of the Office of the Valuer-General which provides administrative support for the Valuers Registration Board.

The incumbent Valuer-General is Neill Sullivan.

== History ==
The office of Valuer-General was established in the Government Valuation of Land Act 1896. The role of the Valuer-General was to maintain the general valuation roll. The roll contained valuations for all properties in New Zealand and would be used by the New Zealand Government to calculate stamp duty for residents.

The position of Valuer-General was separated from the Commissioner of Taxes in 1904 by the Public Officers' Appointment and Powers Act 1904.

In 1948, the Valuers Act established the Valuers Registration Board of which the Valuer-General is the chair of.
