= Toi Te Taiao: The Bioethics Council =

Toi te Taiao: the Bioethics Council was a government-sponsored council of New Zealand that was established in December 2002 and disestablished in 2009.

The Goal of the Bioethics Council is: "To enhance New Zealand's understanding of the cultural, ethical and spiritual aspects of biotechnology and ensure that the use of biotechnology has regard for the values held by New Zealanders."

== Topics Covered ==
- Xenotransplantation
- Human Assisted Reproduction
- Nanotechnology
