= Bream Head =

Promontory in New Zealand

Bream Head Māori: Te Whara
- Cape
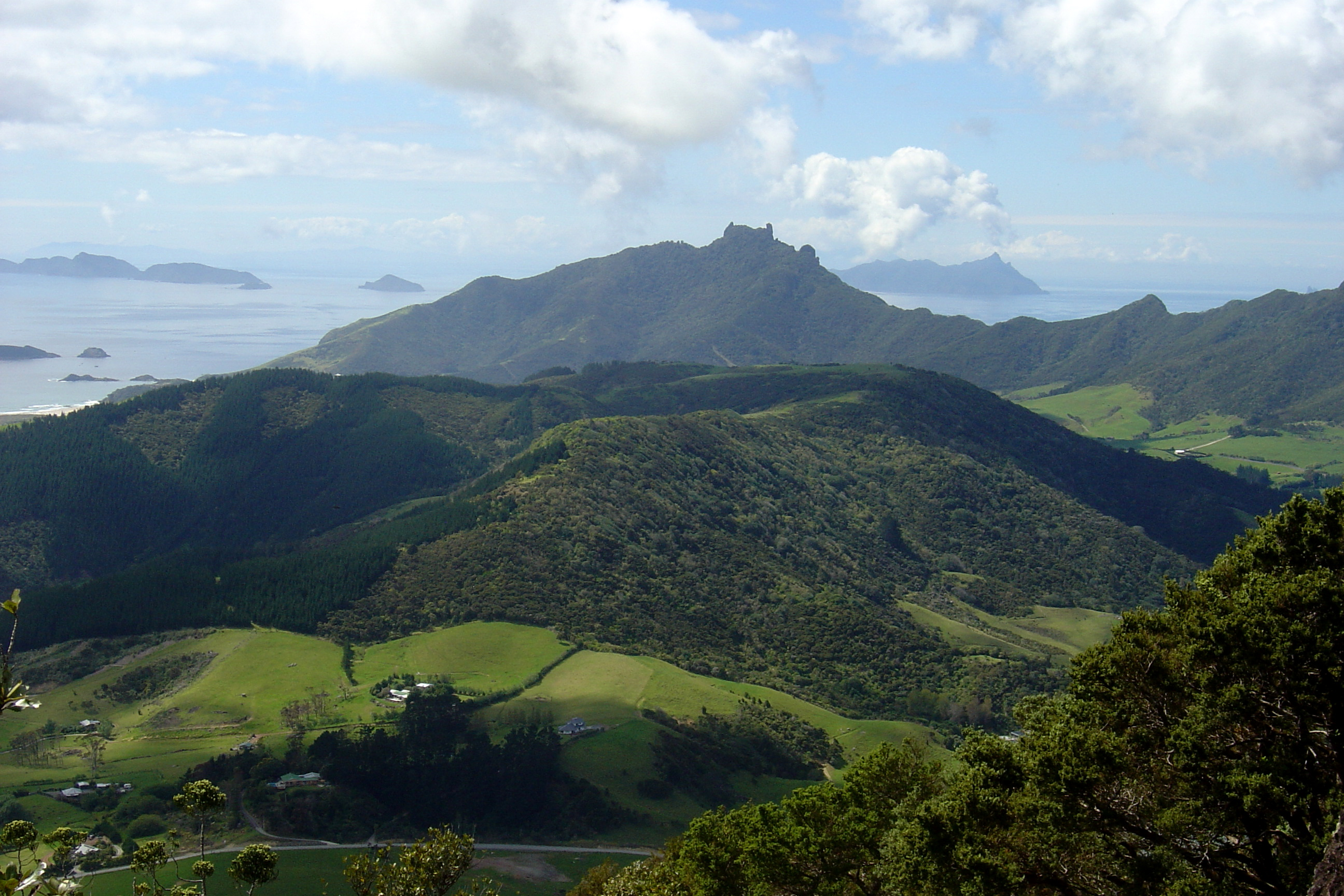
- Bream Head and surrounding islands viewed from neighbouring Mt Manaia

- Location within New Zealand
- Coordinates: 35°51′15″S 174°35′29″E
- Location: Northland, New Zealand
- Water bodies: Southern Pacific Ocean
- Volcanic field: Taurikura volcanic complex
- Last eruption: 19.1 million years ago

Bream Head is a promontory on the east coast of Northland in the North Island of New Zealand. Located at the end of a 30 kilometre-long peninsula, the head juts into the Pacific Ocean to the southeast of Whangārei. The Te Whara Track in the Bream Head Scenic Reserve is at least 700 years old. The Hen and Chicken Islands are located off the headland at a distance of 12 kilometres. It forms the northern extremity of Bream Bay, and guards the entrance to Whangārei Harbour, a natural inlet extending to the northwest. The Marsden Point Oil Refinery is located on the opposing shore of the harbour five kilometres to the west.

To Bream Head's immediate north is a long sandy beach called Ocean Beach.

== Biology ==
It contains a scenic reserve, the Bream Head Scenic Reserve, which unlike Bream Head is an official name. This has a long history of Māori occupation, being now wāhi tapu, and is one of the most important coastal broadleaf forest reserves in Northland with its population of native flax snail – pūpūharakeke and Whirinaki skinks.

== Geology ==
Bream Head and nearby volcanics map with andesite in red shading and dacite in purple shading. The approximate Taurikura volcanic complex is in white shading. Clicking on the map enlarges it, and enables panning and mouseover of volcanic feature name/wikilink and ages before present. The key to the other volcanics that are shown with panning is basalt - brown, monogenic basalts - dark brown, undifferentiated basalts of the Tangihua Complex in Northland Allochthon - light brown, arc basalts - deep orange brown, arc ring basalts -orange brown, rhyolite - violet, basaltic andesite`- light red), ignimbrite (lighter shades of violet), and plutonic - gray.

Bream Head features a prominent bluff usually known by the same name or Te Whara 476 metres (1,562 ft) in height, and to its west Mount Lion at a height of 395 metres (1,296 ft), the remains of a Miocene andesitic volcano.

== Gallery ==
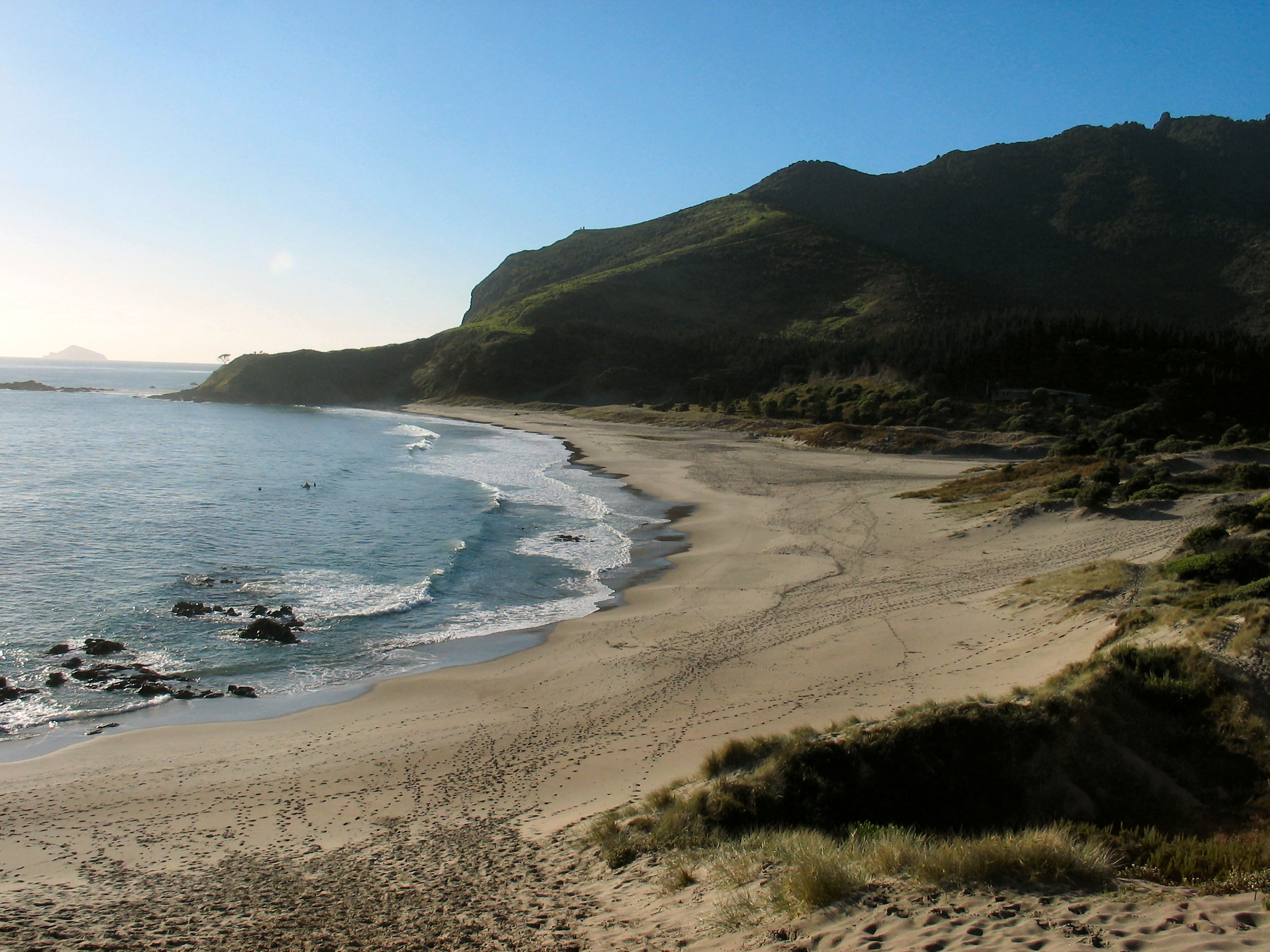
Ocean Beach, looking South

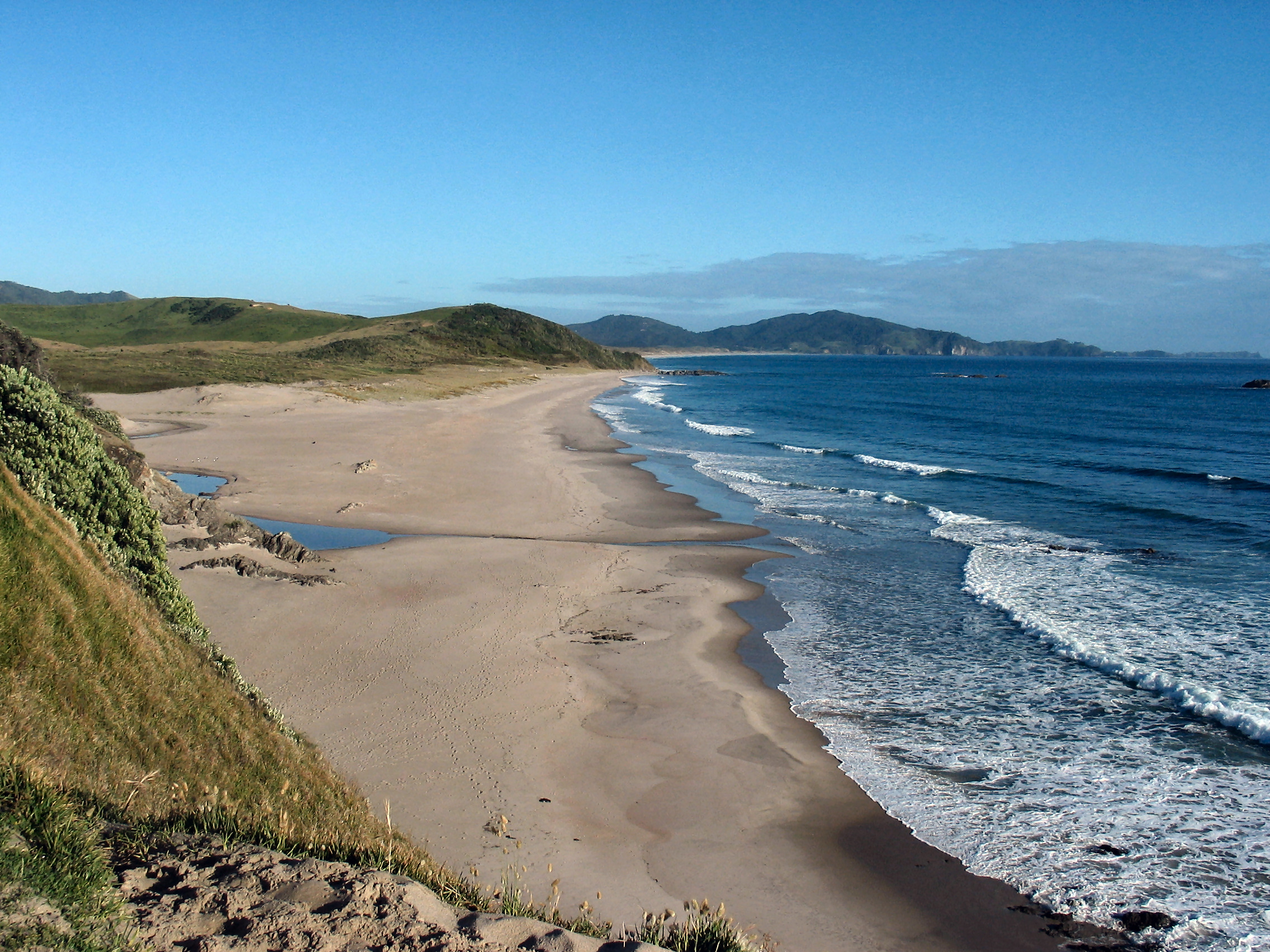
Ocean Beach, looking North

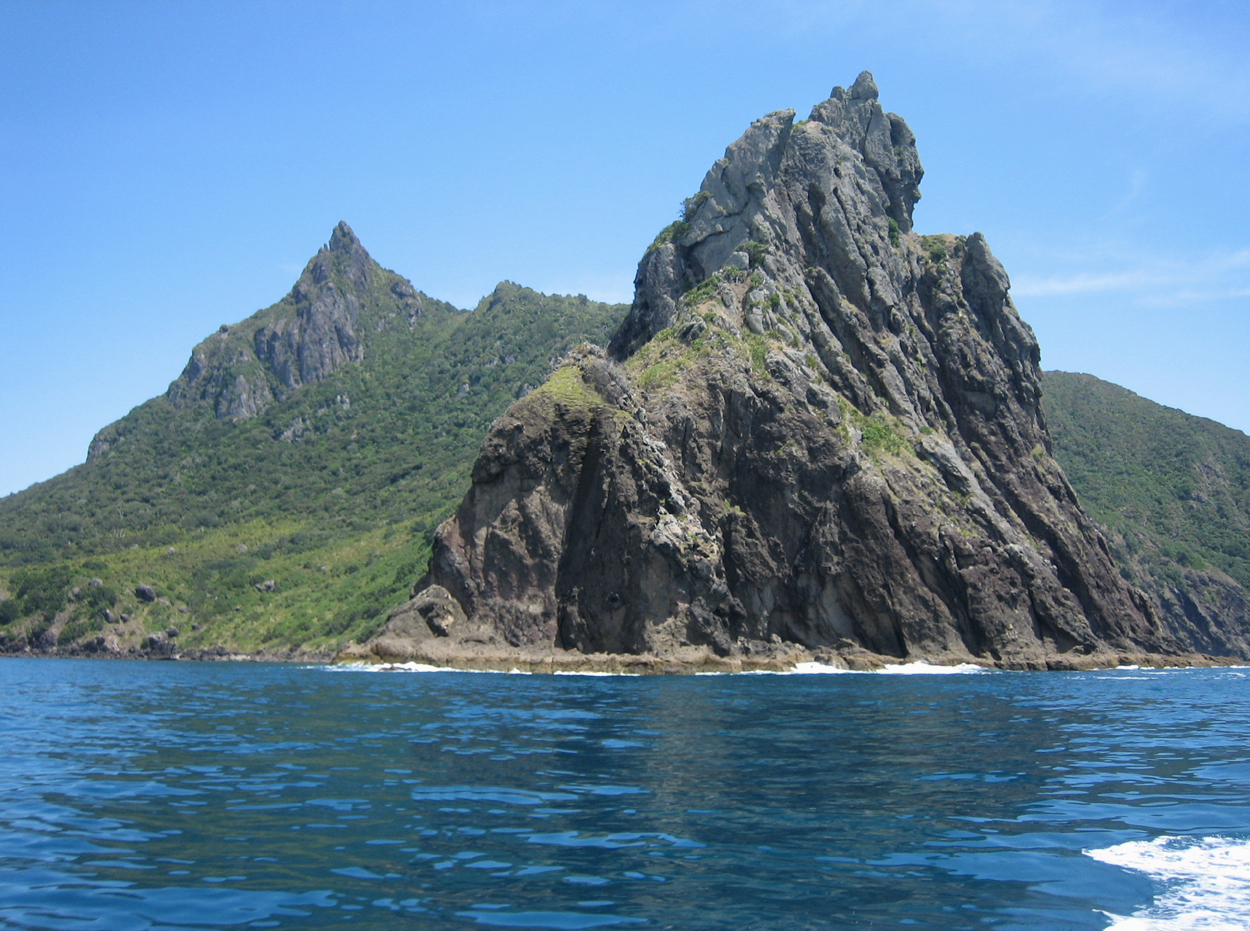
The eastern tip of Bream Head

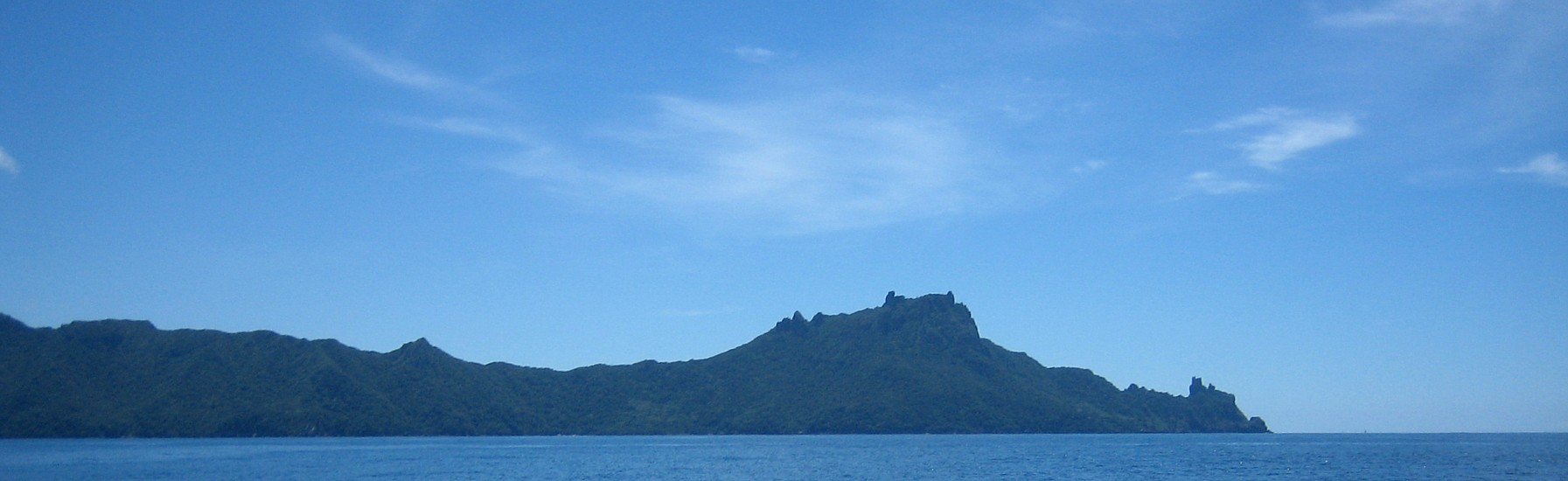
Bream Head, viewed from the south
