= Whangārei Heads =

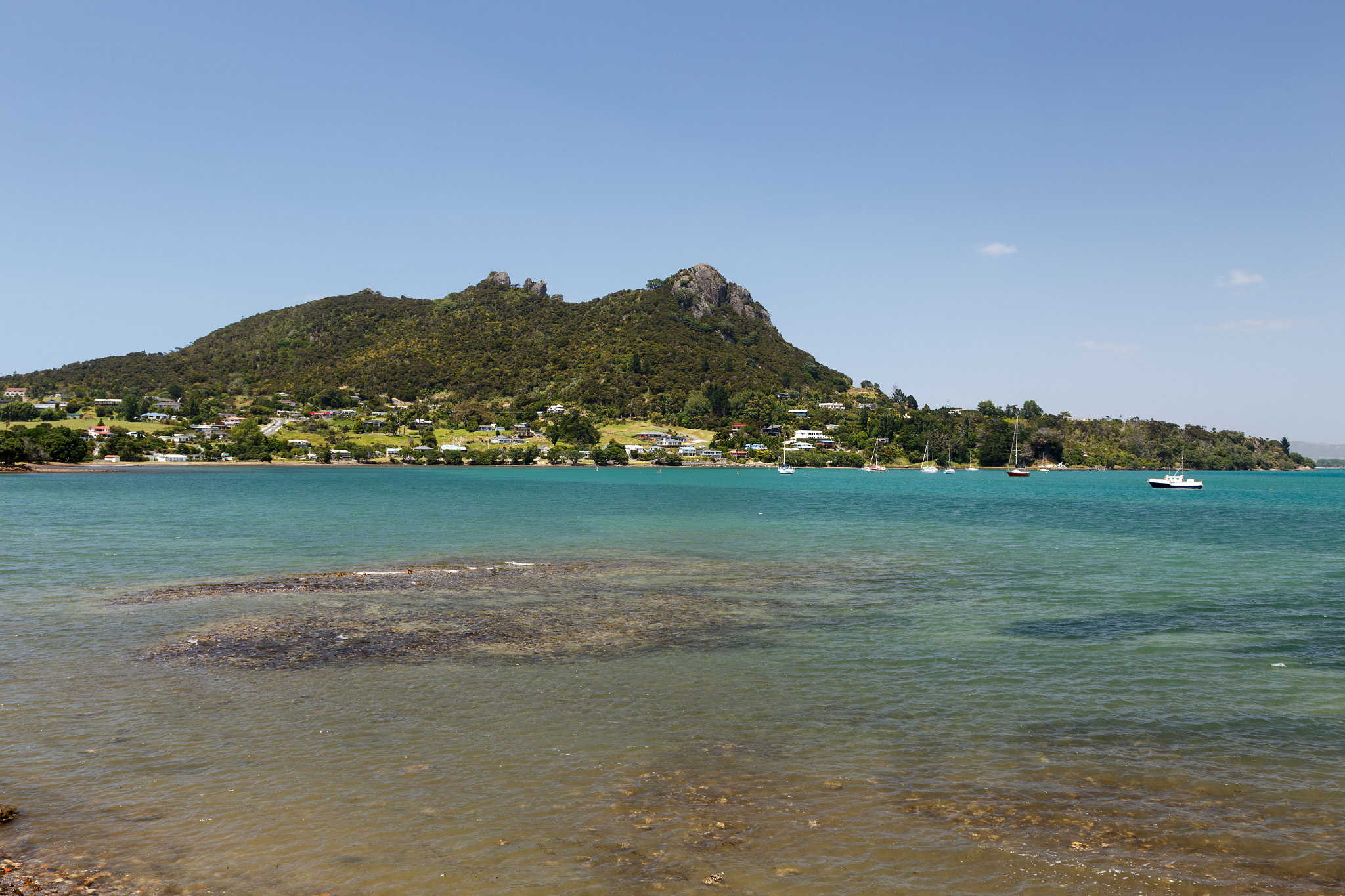
- Mt Aubrey viewed across McLeod Bay
- Interactive map of Whangārei Heads
- Coordinates: 35°49′2″S 174°30′14″E
- Country: New Zealand
- Region: Northland Region
- District: Whangārei District
- Ward: Whangarei Heads Ward
- Electorates: Whangārei; Te Tai Tokerau

Government
  - Territorial Authority: Whangarei District Council
  - Regional council: Northland Regional Council
  - Mayor of Whangārei: Ken Couper
  - Whangārei MP: Shane Reti
  - Te Tai Tokerau MP: Mariameno Kapa-Kingi

Area
  - Total: 5.16 km^{2} (1.99 sq mi)

Population (June 2025)
  - Total: 940
  - Density: 180/km^{2} (470/sq mi)

Whangārei Heads is a locality and volcanic promontory on the northern side of the Whangārei Harbour in Northland, New Zealand. Whangārei is 29 km (18 mi) to the north-west, and Ocean Beach is 8 km (5.0 mi) to the south-east, with Taurikura between the two. Mount Manaia rises to 420 metres (1,380 feet) to the east.

Immediately to the west is McLeod Bay, which is about 2 km (1.2 mi) long. The McDonald sandbank lies a few metres offshore at low tide. The promontory to the south of the settlement consists of a hill, Mount Aubrey, and a small gravel beach about 200 metres wide, Reotahi Bay.

== Geology ==
The heads contain the remnants of a number of extinct volcanoes with the dominant rocks being andesite or dacite. They were formed between 16 and 22 million years ago during the early Miocene. They are part of a 50 km^{2} (19 sq mi) stratovolcano that extended to the Hen and Chickens Islands.

== History ==
Gilbert Mair purchased the entire peninsula - everything south of a line running from McLeod Bay to the Pacific Coast, about 10,000 acres (40 km^{2}) – from the Māori chief Te Tao, in 1839. He intended to resell it to Captain Bernard, but the latter was lost with his ship. The chief Te Tirarau claimed compensation of three horses because his ancestor had had blood spilt on the land, but settled for two horses in 1844. The government review of the land purchase in 1844 awarded Mair only 414 acres (1.7 km^{2}), but Mair had sold his interest in the land to Logan Campbell. Campbell pursued his claim to the remainder of the land.

A group of settlers from Nova Scotia, led by the Rev. Norman McLeod, settled at McLeod Bay in about 1855 although the ownership of the land had not been settled. In 1861, Campbell received the right to buy 1,800 acres (10 km^{2}) at 10/- an acre, and was granted 910 acres (3.7 km^{2}) which he sold to the Nova Scotians.

On 8 February 1907 a tugboat named Awarua, belonging to the Devonport Steam Ferry Company, struck an uncharted rock and sunk near the Whangārei Heads. She left for Kauri Mount to pick up logs to be delivered to Auckland. The ship was built in Blackwall, England in 1884 and weighed 159 tons. The crew all survived.

== Demographics ==
Statistics New Zealand describes Whangārei Heads as a rural settlement. The settlement covers 5.16 km^{2} (1.99 sq mi) and had an estimated population of 940 as of June 2025, with a population density of 182 people per km^{2}. The settlement is part of the larger Bream Head statistical area.

Historical population for Whangārei Heads
Year	Pop.	±% p.a.
2006	723	—
2013	762	+0.75%
2018	963	+4.79%
2023	948	−0.31%

Whangārei Heads had a population of 948 in the 2023 New Zealand census, a decrease of 15 people (−1.6%) since the 2018 census, and an increase of 186 people (24.4%) since the 2013 census. There were 465 males and 483 females in 414 dwellings. 2.2% of people identified as LGBTIQ+. The median age was 53.2 years (compared with 38.1 years nationally). There were 171 people (18.0%) aged under 15 years, 72 (7.6%) aged 15 to 29, 411 (43.4%) aged 30 to 64, and 294 (31.0%) aged 65 or older.

People could identify as more than one ethnicity. The results were 94.9% European (Pākehā); 10.4% Māori; 1.3% Pasifika; 2.2% Asian; 0.6% Middle Eastern, Latin American and African New Zealanders (MELAA); and 1.9% other, which includes people giving their ethnicity as "New Zealander". English was spoken by 98.1%, Māori language by 1.3%, and other languages by 6.0%. No language could be spoken by 1.6% (e.g. too young to talk). New Zealand Sign Language was known by 0.6%. The percentage of people born overseas was 20.6, compared with 28.8% nationally.

Religious affiliations were 25.0% Christian, 0.3% Hindu, 0.6% Māori religious beliefs, 0.3% Buddhist, 0.3% New Age, and 0.9% other religions. People who answered that they had no religion were 65.8%, and 7.0% of people did not answer the census question.

Of those at least 15 years old, 177 (22.8%) people had a bachelor's or higher degree, 399 (51.4%) had a post-high school certificate or diploma, and 141 (18.1%) people exclusively held high school qualifications. The median income was $35,700, compared with $41,500 nationally. 96 people (12.4%) earned over $100,000 compared to 12.1% nationally. The employment status of those at least 15 was that 303 (39.0%) people were employed full-time, 129 (16.6%) were part-time, and 18 (2.3%) were unemployed.

=== Bream Head statistical area ===
Bream Head statistical area covers 52.18 km^{2} (20.15 sq mi) and had an estimated population of 1,430 as of June 2025, with a population density of 27 people per km^{2}.

Historical population for Bream Head
Year	Pop.	±% p.a.
2006	1,062	—
2013	1,110	+0.63%
2018	1,392	+4.63%
2023	1,431	+0.55%

Bream Head had a population of 1,431 in the 2023 New Zealand census, an increase of 39 people (2.8%) since the 2018 census, and an increase of 321 people (28.9%) since the 2013 census. There were 708 males and 720 females in 615 dwellings. 2.9% of people identified as LGBTIQ+. The median age was 53.0 years (compared with 38.1 years nationally). There were 264 people (18.4%) aged under 15 years, 114 (8.0%) aged 15 to 29, 633 (44.2%) aged 30 to 64, and 423 (29.6%) aged 65 or older.

People could identify as more than one ethnicity. The results were 95.0% European (Pākehā); 12.8% Māori; 2.3% Pasifika; 1.9% Asian; 0.6% Middle Eastern, Latin American and African New Zealanders (MELAA); and 2.1% other, which includes people giving their ethnicity as "New Zealander". English was spoken by 98.1%, Māori language by 1.5%, and other languages by 6.3%. No language could be spoken by 1.5% (e.g. too young to talk). New Zealand Sign Language was known by 0.6%. The percentage of people born overseas was 20.8, compared with 28.8% nationally.

Religious affiliations were 22.4% Christian, 0.2% Hindu, 0.4% Māori religious beliefs, 0.4% Buddhist, 0.4% New Age, and 0.8% other religions. People who answered that they had no religion were 68.1%, and 7.1% of people did not answer the census question.

Of those at least 15 years old, 267 (22.9%) people had a bachelor's or higher degree, 612 (52.4%) had a post-high school certificate or diploma, and 210 (18.0%) people exclusively held high school qualifications. The median income was $36,400, compared with $41,500 nationally. 141 people (12.1%) earned over $100,000 compared to 12.1% nationally. The employment status of those at least 15 was that 456 (39.1%) people were employed full-time, 207 (17.7%) were part-time, and 24 (2.1%) were unemployed.

== Education ==
Whangarei Heads School is a coeducational full primary (years 1–8) school with a roll of 142 students as of July 2026. The school was established in 1858, and is the second oldest school still in operation on its original site in the country.
