= Traffic Safety Service =

Traffic Safety Service Te Manatū Waka (Māori)

Agency overview
- Formed: 1968 (as part of the Ministry of Transport)
- Dissolved: 1992
- Employees: 8,459 (as of 30 June 1992)

Jurisdictional structure
- National agency: New Zealand
- Operations jurisdiction: New Zealand
- Governing body: New Zealand Government
- General nature: Local civilian police

Operational structure
- Headquarters: Wellington, New Zealand
- Sworn members: 8,459 (as of 30 June 1992)
- Minister responsible: Rob Storey (as of 30 June 1992), Minister of Transport
- Agency executive: Phil Wright, Chief Traffic Superintendent (as of 30 June 1992)

The Traffic Safety Service (Māori: Te Manatū Waka) was a division of the Ministry of Transport of New Zealand. It was a uniformed law enforcement agency responsible for enforcing road transport law in New Zealand. It was separate from the New Zealand Police.

From the late 1920s until 1992, traffic law enforcement in New Zealand was not normally carried out by the New Zealand Police. Instead, it was carried out by a combination of a central government agency and various territorial local bodies, each appointing their own traffic officers. Government traffic officers had jurisdiction on all roads but in practice tended to patrol only areas not covered by local body traffic officers.

Over a period of decades, central government gradually took over the national enforcement of traffic laws by amalgamating local body traffic departments into one organisation under the Ministry of Transport. The Traffic Safety Service was the final culmination of this process. By the early 1990s it became the sole national traffic law enforcement agency, still separate from the New Zealand Police.

In 1992 the Traffic Safety Service was itself absorbed into the New Zealand Police, which now has responsibility for road traffic enforcement across New Zealand.

== Traffic Officers in New Zealand ==
A 'Traffic Officer' in New Zealand was a type of law enforcement officer having circumscribed powers under road traffic-related legislation, mainly the Transport Act 1962 (repealed in 2011) and its subsidiary Traffic Regulations to stop, detain and in certain cases arrest individuals. These powers of arrest were initially limited to offences involving driving and alcohol but over time extended to cover related offences such as assault or failing to stop when signalled. Traffic officers did not take an oath and consequently did not have the broad powers of arrest of a Police Constable in New Zealand. Traffic officers employed by the Traffic Safety Service were officially appointed by a warrant issued by the Minister of Transport, which gave them jurisdiction on any road in New Zealand. The traffic officers employed by local bodies were appointed under the legislation that granted the local body its statutory powers and so did not have national jurisdiction.

== History of Traffic Officers in New Zealand ==
The first traffic officer was employed by the Auckland City Traffic Department in 1894 to police horse-drawn traffic. In the early part of the twentieth century, a Main Highways Board was established, which was responsible for all aspects of roading in New Zealand. The Board directly employed a few full-time 'Traffic Inspectors' enforcing road rules, as well as subsidizing local authorities that appointed Traffic Inspectors in the respective regions.

In 1929 the government, seeking to better coordinate national transport activities, established the Transport Department. The department took over motor vehicle registration and former 'traffic inspectors' became 'traffic officers', tasked with enforcement of traffic laws on national roads.

== Local body traffic enforcement in New Zealand ==
In a few urban areas, traffic policing remained the responsibility of local bodies for many years. The principal local body uniformed traffic departments (as opposed to local body parking wardens, which were more common) were in Lower Hutt City; Napier City; Auckland City; Tamaki City; and Ellerslie and Mount Albert boroughs in greater Auckland. Auckland International Airport Authority and the Auckland Harbour Bridge Authority also employed their own traffic officers. The latter was disestablished in 1983 and its 'Bridge Control Officers' continued to work under the supervision of the Ministry of Transport, dedicated to ensuring free flow of traffic over the Bridge.

In 1989, with local body amalgamation across New Zealand, the former Tamaki City and Ellerslie and Mount Albert boroughs were subsumed into an enlarged Auckland City and their traffic officers, along with those of Auckland City all became employees of the Ministry of Transport.

All Traffic Officers, whether employed by the Ministry of Transport or by local authority, were eligible for the award of a Traffic Service Medal after 14 years of service.

== Ministry of Transport (1968–1992) ==
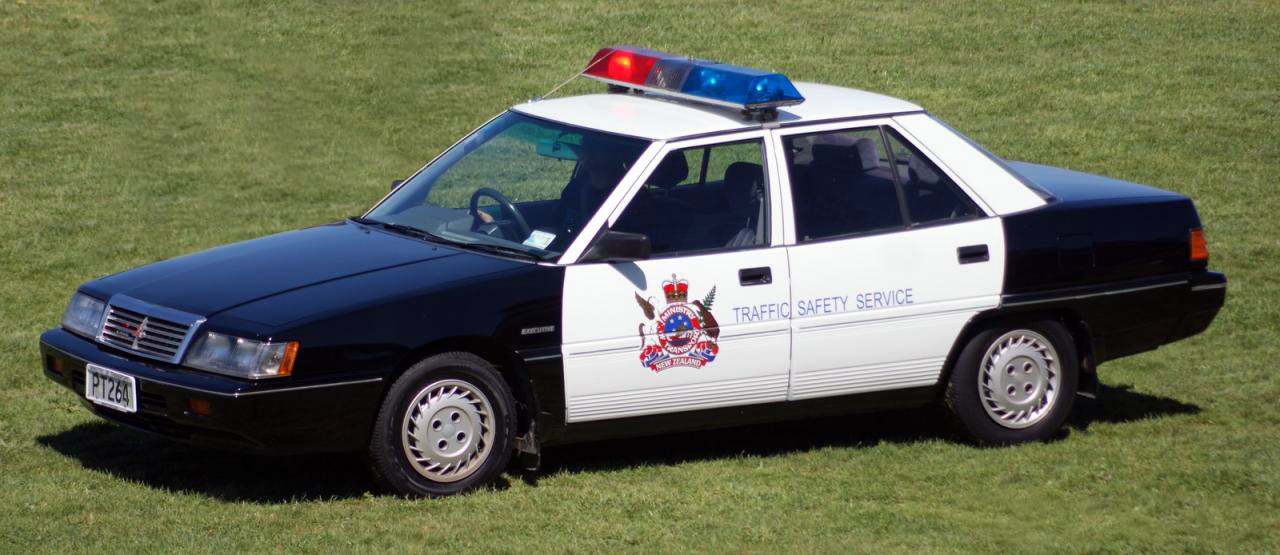
1990–1991 Mitsubishi V3000 Executive sedan

The Transport Department became the Ministry of Transport in 1968. Road traffic enforcement was overseen by the 'Road Transport Division' of the Ministry. In 1988, this division was renamed the 'Land Transport Division' and included the newly named 'Traffic Safety Service' ('TSS'). There followed a period during which remaining local body traffic enforcement was taken over by the Traffic Safety Service.

By the early 1990s the TSS had completed this consolidation, so that all road traffic enforcement in New Zealand was primarily carried out by the traffic officers of the TSS. During this time New Zealand Police constables legally had almost all the same powers as traffic officers and in certain circumstances enforced traffic laws, particularly but not exclusively in remote rural locations.

== Merger with New Zealand Police (1992) ==
On 1 July 1992 the Traffic Safety Service was merged into the New Zealand Police and from that time road traffic enforcement in New Zealand became the total responsibility of the Police. Traffic Officers were gradually trained for other policing duties, with the majority eventually becoming sworn police officers and going on to serve in a variety of roles. A few elected to remain as non-sworn traffic officers but still employed by the Police.
