= Accounting Standards Review Board =

NZ government agency

Accounting Standards Review Board (ASRB) is a body set up to review and approve financial reporting standards in New Zealand. It was formed by the Financial Reporting Act of 1993

ASRB can have between four and nine members. The Governor General of New Zealand on the recommendation of the Minister of Commerce appoints the members by virtue of their knowledge and experience in law, finance, business, economics and accounting.
