= Jill Day =

Jill Day may refer to:

- Jill Day (singer)
- Jill Day (politician)
