= Nigel Haworth =

New Zealand academic and politician

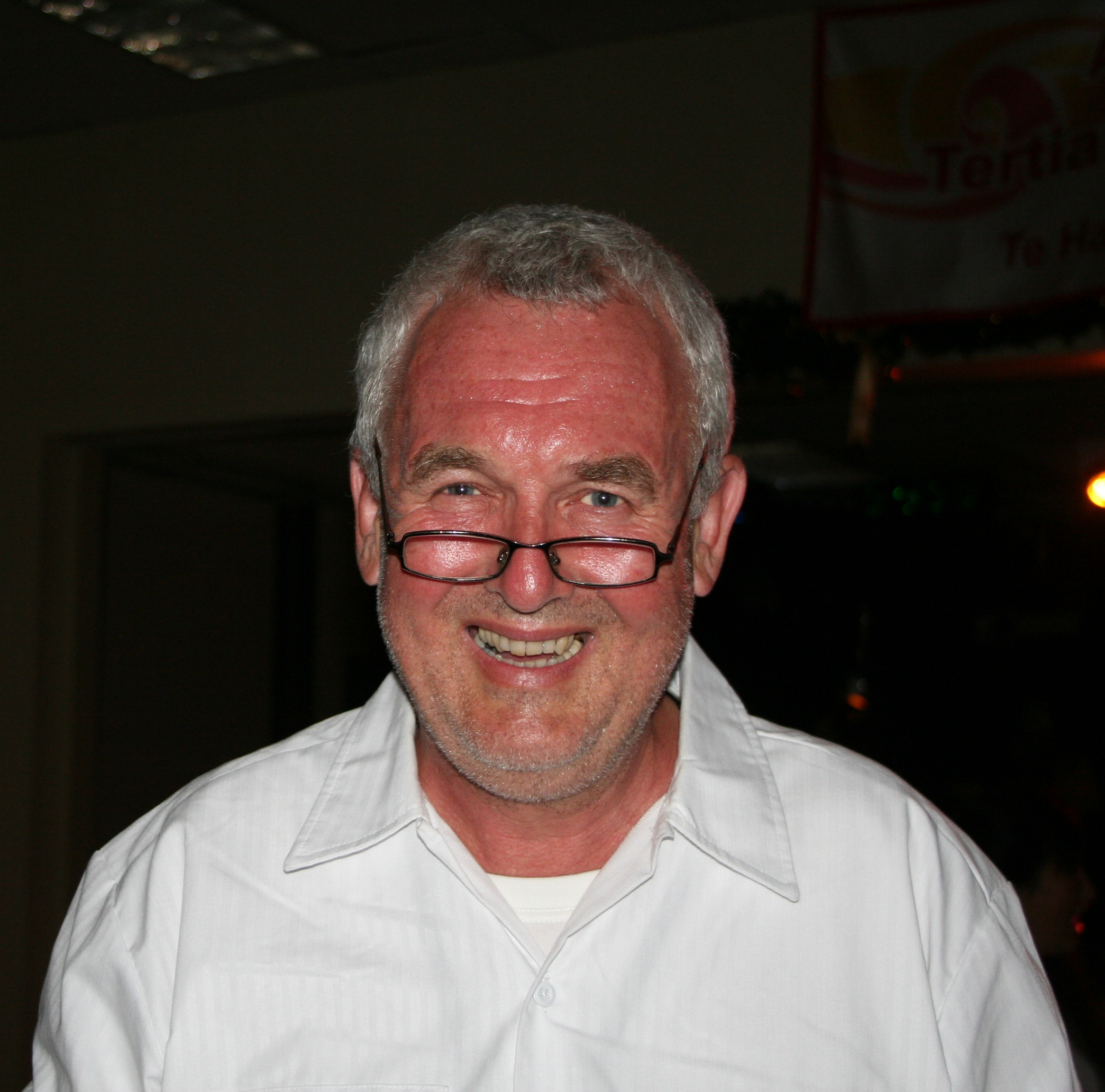

35th President of the Labour Party
- In office 27 February 2015 – 11 September 2019
- Vice President: Ginny Andersen; Beth Houston; Tracey McLellan
- Leader: Andrew Little; Jacinda Ardern
- Preceded by: Moira Coatsworth
- Succeeded by: Claire Szabó

Personal details
- Born: Nigel Anthony Fell Haworth; 1951 (age 74–75) Wales
- Party: Labour
- Scientific career
- Education: University of Liverpool
- Fields: Economics; Latin American studies International labour market
- Workplaces: University of Strathclyde; University of Auckland
- Thesis: The industrial community in Arequipa: the failure of a new unitarism (1982)

Nigel Anthony Fell Haworth (born 1951) is a New Zealand economics academic and politician. He was elected President of the New Zealand Labour Party in February 2015, succeeding Moira Coatsworth.

== Education and academic career ==
Born in Wales in 1951, Haworth studied economics at the University of Liverpool, and completed a PhD there in 1982. He specialises in Latin American studies and the international labour market.

From 1978 to 1988, Haworth was a lecturer in industrial relations at the University of Strathclyde. He then emigrated to New Zealand to take up a post at the University of Auckland, becoming a professor in 1993. He was appointed head of the Department of Management and International Business in 2012 for a three-year term.

== Politics ==
Haworth served as president of the Association of University Staff of New Zealand from 2005 to 2008. In 2012 he was elected as a member of the New Zealand Labour Party's policy council, and the following year he became a member of the Labour Party's New Zealand Council. He was elected to succeed Moira Coatworth as Labour Party President in 2015.

In September 2019, Haworth resigned as Labour Party President in response to criticism over his handling of allegations of bullying, harassment, and sexual assault against a male Labour Party staffer. His resignation followed an allegation by a female Labour Party volunteer that she had been violently sexually assaulted by the male staffer. In December 2019, an independent review into the allegations of sexual assault, undertaken by Maria Dew QC on behalf of the Labour Party, found no sexual assaults nor instances of sexual harassment could be established. The Dew investigation cast major doubt over the allegations made by the principal complainant, who was also found to have been in a personal relationship with the respondent. Ms Dew concluded that the New Zealand Labour Party Code of Conduct and Harassment policies did not govern their personal relationship.

Party political offices
Preceded by Moira Coatsworth	President of the Labour Party; 2015–2019	Succeeded by Claire Szabó
