= Mike Williams (New Zealand politician) =

New Zealand politician (born 1949)

Mike Williams ONZM
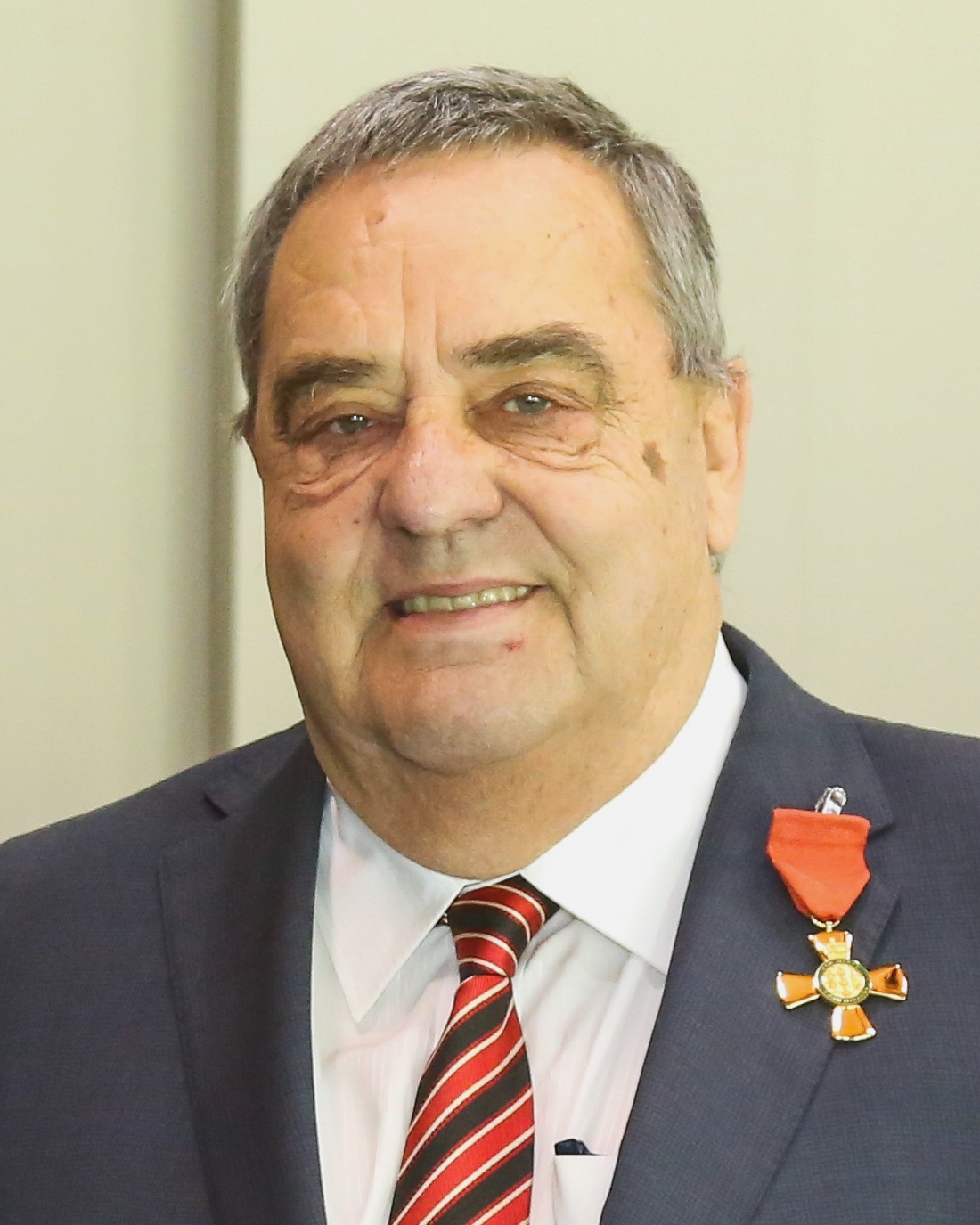
- Williams in 2023

32nd President of the Labour Party
- In office 19 November 2000 – 2 March 2009
- Vice President: Terry Scott; Pat Webster; Marian Hobbs
- Leader: Helen Clark; Phil Goff
- Preceded by: Bob Harvey
- Succeeded by: Andrew Little

Personal details
- Born: 1949 (age 76–77)
- Party: Labour
- Education: Victoria University of Wellington; University of Auckland

Kenneth Michael Williams ONZM (born 1949) is a former president of the New Zealand Labour Party.

== Early life ==
Williams lived in Wainuiomata as a child before his family moved to Hastings. There he attended Karamu High School and was a friend of Paul Holmes. He, alongside Holmes and Peter Beaven, organised a high school debating team. At the age of 17, Williams joined the New Zealand Labour Party. He was recruited to the party by MP Jonathan Hunt. He attended Victoria University of Wellington, where he joined marches against apartheid, nuclear weapons and the Vietnam War. He obtained a Master of Arts degree in New Zealand History from the University of Auckland. It was here that he first met future Prime Minister Helen Clark, where they were both members of the Princes Street Branch of the Labour Party.

== Commercial activities ==
Williams set up two successful companies based on his experience of Labour Party organisation. Insight Research (now UMR Insight) was a market research company (which was sold in 1994) and Insight Data, which specialised in direct-mail and marketing and was sold in 1997. Williams has been an information technology consultant and was a director (until December 2008) of Genesis Energy, the NZ Transport Agency, and GNS Science.

== Political involvement ==
When living briefly in the United Kingdom Williams was invited to fill the role of a campaign manager to David Butcher (an old school friend of his) in the Hastings electorate at the 1978 election. Williams returned to New Zealand to manage the campaign and credits his experience in the campaign as getting him "hooked" on politics. He was not interested in becoming a Member of Parliament but was interested in political organisation, particularly the computerisation of it.

Williams then started working for the Labour Party itself as an education officer during the 1981 election campaign, which Labour narrowly lost. Afterwards, he rapidly moved into fundraising where he instigated a number of new practices including, a pledge system (whereby supporters agreed to pay a regular amount using the then-new automatic bank transfer system), sending out requests for donations to the party membership, enclosing pre-paid reply envelopes, visiting businesses to solicit donations, systematic canvassing and direct-mailing. These activities helped the party to achieve a landslide victory at the next election in 1984. After the election, Williams joined the Australian Labor Party in Canberra, after being headhunted for his computerisation skills and experience. but returned to New Zealand within a year. He attained a job at parliament working for Prime Minister David Lange, in charge of Lange's external communications and direct mail.

After having sold his second company, Insight Data, Williams was invited by his friend and Labour MP Pete Hodgson for the role of Labour's nationwide campaign manager for the 1999 election. Williams ran the 1999 election, which was won by the Labour Party. After the election he was elected as party president at that years annual conference. He defeated former Labour MP Richard Northey 347 votes to 138. As president he dealt frequently with personnel issues and dealt with most "behind closed doors". In 2022 Williams revealed such an instance that when a senior official in an electorate was exposed as a paedophile he fired him from his job, despite thinking retrospectively that he didn't have the authority to do so. Williams retired as Labour's president in 2009 after Labour's defeat in the 2008 election. He was the second longest serving president in Labour's history.

== Post-politics activities ==
In 2009 he became the chief executive officer of the anti-P Stellar Trust, a charity which campaigns to raise awareness of the dangers of methamphetamine.

Williams unsuccessfully stood for several local government positions in the 2010 Auckland local elections. These were the Henderson-Massey Local Board, the Waitakere Licensing Trust, and the Waitematā District Health Board.

Since 2011 he has been the chief executive officer of the Howard League for Penal Reform, a lobbying organisation for prison reform in New Zealand.

== Honours and awards ==
In the 2023 New Year Honours, Williams was appointed an Officer of the New Zealand Order of Merit, for services to governance and the community.

== Notes ==
Party political offices
Preceded by Bob Harvey	President of the Labour Party; 2000–2009	Succeeded by Andrew Little
