= Claire Szabó =

New Zealand chief executive officer

36th President of the Labour Party
- In office 30 November 2019 – 5 November 2022
- Prime Minister: Jacinda Ardern
- Vice President: Carol Beaumont
- Preceded by: Nigel Haworth
- Succeeded by: Jill Day

Personal details
- Born: 1980 or 1981 (age 45–46)
- Party: Labour
- Spouse: Rowan Johnston
- Children: 2
- Education: University of Auckland
- Profession: Executive

Claire Elizabeth Szabó is a New Zealand chief executive officer and was president of the New Zealand Labour Party from 2019 to 2022.

== Biography ==
Her father came to New Zealand as a refugee from Hungary in 1956 following the Hungarian Uprising, her mother was a nurse. She grew up in Papakura in a council house.

After finishing her high school education at Diocesan School for Girls in Auckland, she studied music at the University of Auckland and later gained degrees at Trinity College Dublin in Education Management, Victoria University of Wellington in Commerce and Administration, and Harvard University in Public Administration.

In 2006, aged 27, she became the chief executive officer of English Language Partners New Zealand. In 2013, she became the chief executive officer of Habitat for Humanity New Zealand. In 2010, she was both named young executive of the year and won the New Zealand Institute of Management award.

Szabó joined the Labour Party in 2007 and stood as the Labour candidate in the electorate of North Shore at the 2014 election, and was number 38 on the party list. She was defeated by the incumbent, Maggie Barry of National Party by a margin of 16,503 votes. On 30 November 2019, she was elected President of the Labour Party following the resignation of Nigel Haworth earlier that year.

In 2021, Szabó was appointed to the board of the New Zealand Symphony Orchestra, alongside Chris Finlayson.

On 17 June 2022, Szabó announced that she will not seek re-election to the Labour Party presidency at the November 2022 annual conference, and will end her tenure then. She told The New Zealand Herald that she has reflected on standing for Parliament again at the 2023 general election, but said "I know definitively it's too early to make a decision." She was succeeded by Jill Day, the former Deputy Mayor of Wellington, at the party's conference in November 2022.

In February 2023, Szabó was one of four candidates vying for the Labour nomination in Wellington Central for the 2023 election. She was unsuccessful with list MP Ibrahim Omer winning the selection contest.

== Personal life ==
She is married to Rowan Johnston, a choir conductor, and has two children.

Szabó speaks fluent Hungarian, the mother tongue of her father.

== Notes ==
Party political offices
Preceded by Nigel Haworth	President of the Labour Party; 2019–2022	Succeeded by Jill Day
