= Moira Coatsworth =

New Zealand politician

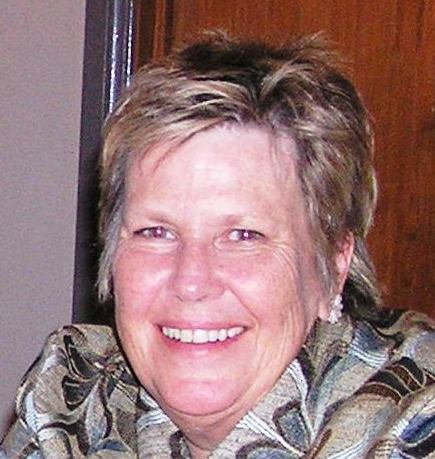

34th President of the Labour Party
- In office 2 April 2011 – 26 November 2014
- Prime Minister: Phil Goff; David Shearer; David Cunliffe; Andrew Little
- Vice President: Robert Gallagher
- Preceded by: Andrew Little
- Succeeded by: Nigel Haworth

Personal details
- Born: 1953 or 1954 (age 72–73) South Africa
- Party: Labour Party

Moira Coatsworth (born 1953 or 1954) is a former president of the New Zealand Labour Party, serving in that role from 2011 to 2015. Coatsworth worked as a child psychologist and is a trustee of Brain Tumour Support NZ and chair of a wildlife charity.

== Early years ==
Born in South Africa, Coatsworth moved to New Zealand when she was eight. She works as a child psychologist and owns a small farm in the Coromandel.

== Political career ==
Coatsworth joined the Labour Party in the 1980s during anti-mining campaigns in the Coromandel. Later, she was the Waikato-Bay of Plenty regional representative in Labour's New Zealand Council.

Before being elected president, Coatsworth was Senior Vice President of the Labour Party. She was elected President of the Labour Party unopposed on 2 April 2011.

She has "absolutely no ambition" to be an MP.

== Resignation ==
On 26 November 2014, Coatsworth announced her intention to move forward her resignation as president to mid-December 2014, after completing the election in which Andrew Little was elected Party Leader, and starting the party's 2014 review. She stated that her reasons for leaving were that she wants "to see a new president working with Andrew as the new leader, really hitting the ground running at the beginning of next year and getting a plan in and getting moving." Nigel Haworth was elected as her successor.

Coatsworth worked as a child psychologist for thirty-five years, until 2019, when her daughter was diagnosed with a brain tumour. As a trustee of Brain Tumour Support NZ, she helped publish a support guide for families with a child with a brain tumour. Coatsworth lives on the Coromandel Peninsula, where she is chair of Thames Coast Kiwi Care.

Party political offices
Preceded by Andrew Little	President of the Labour Party; 2011–2014	Succeeded by Nigel Haworth
