= Rex Jones =

New Zealand trade unionist

27th President of the Labour Party
- In office 9 November 1987 – 3 September 1988
- Vice President: Ruth Dyson
- Preceded by: Margaret Wilson
- Succeeded by: Ruth Dyson

Personal details
- Born: 1951 (age 74–75) Auckland, New Zealand
- Party: Labour
- Occupation: Trade unionist

Rex Elliott Jones (born 1951) is a New Zealand trade unionist.

== Biography ==
Jones was born in 1951 to Kieth Elliott and Gwendoline Sylvia Jones. He lived in Papatoetoe, Auckland and became a union delegate in 1969. In 1972, as secretary of the Labourers' Union, he negotiated for eight months to establish a superannuation scheme for pottery industry employees, under which only employers made contributions, which was hailed as a major advance in the industrial relations field.

In 1984, Jones became National Secretary of the Engineering, Printing and Manufacturing Union (EPMU), a position he held for 16 years. Also a member of the Federation of Labour and Council of Trade Union Executives. Jones labelled his time as National Secretary as "turbulent". He headed the union through the Rogernomics policies of market liberalisation which caused severe workplace displacements from 1984 to 1990 and then the Bolger-Birch years of the Employment Contracts Act, 1991 which saw drastic reductions in union membership. He was succeeded by the assistant national secretary Andrew Little.

As the EPMU was an affiliated union to the New Zealand Labour Party he was also involved with the party. He was President of the Labour Party from 1987 until 1988 when he declined to stand for re-election. Little, his successor as EPMU National Secretary, would likewise become Labour Party President.

At his retirement from the role Margaret Wilson, the Minister of Labour stated that "...Jones has made an outstanding contribution to unionism, to the Labour Movement and to industry in New Zealand." After leaving the EPMU Jones was appointed as a representatives member to Industry New Zealand, a group established by the government to consider projects and activities for government assistance.

Party political offices
Preceded by Margaret Wilson	President of the Labour Party; 1987–1988	Succeeded by Ruth Dyson
Trade union offices
Preceded by Ernie Ball	National Secretary of the EPMU; 1984–2000	Succeeded by Andrew Little
