= President of the New Zealand Labour Party =

Head of New Zealand Labour Party outside parliament

President of the Labour Party
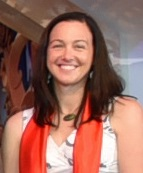
- Incumbent; Jill Day since 5 November 2022
- Term length: No fixed term
- Inaugural holder: James McCombs
- Formation: 7 July 1916
- Deputy: Carol Beaumont
- Website: Labour Party profile

The president of the New Zealand Labour Party is the highest-ranked organisational figure within the New Zealand Labour Party. The president heads the party apparatus outside of parliament, serving as the chairperson of both the party's council and policy council. Since 2022, the office has been held by Jill Day.

== Selection ==
The president is elected by the party delegates at the Labour Party annual conference or, if an early vacancy occurs, a by-election via postal ballot.

== Role ==
While the party leader is responsible for leading the Labour Party's political agenda and representing Labour in parliament, the president is responsible for managing the party's internal affairs and ensuring that the party is organised and compliant with relevant laws and regulations.

The president is the chair of the party's governing body, the New Zealand Council, and presides of its meetings and functions. Additionally the president chairs Labour's policy council and party list moderating committee. The president is paid an honorarium for their services.

== History ==
The post of president of the Labour Party was officially created upon the party's inception in 1916, the inaugural holder was James McCombs. The longest serving president was James Roberts serving 13 years consecutively from 1937 to 1950. The first Māori holder was Charles Bennett (1973–76). Margaret Wilson was the first woman to be elected president in 1984.

== List of presidents ==
The following is a complete list of Labour Party presidents:

No.	President	Portrait	Prior/concurrent office	Term of Office		Leader
1	James McCombs		MP for Lyttelton	7 July 1916	9 July 1917	Hindmarsh
2	Andrew Walker		MP for Dunedin North	9 July 1917	11 July 1918	Hindmarsh
3	Tom Paul		Member of the Legislative Council	11 July 1918	12 July 1920	Hindmarsh
3	Tom Paul		Member of the Legislative Council	11 July 1918	12 July 1920	Holland
4	Peter Fraser		MP for Wellington Central	12 July 1920	15 July 1921	Holland
5	Frederick Cooke		Vice-president of the Labour Party	15 July 1921	7 July 1922	Holland
6	Tom Brindle		Vice-president of the Waterside Workers Union	7 July 1922	7 April 1926	Holland
7	Bob Semple		MP for Wellington East	7 April 1926	12 April 1928	Holland
8	John Archer		Mayor of Christchurch	12 April 1928	3 April 1929	Holland
9	Jim Thorn		Vice-president of the Labour Party	3 April 1929	8 April 1931	Holland
10	Rex Mason		MP for Auckland Suburbs	8 April 1931	29 March 1932	Holland
11	Bill Jordan		MP for Manukau	29 March 1932	18 April 1933	Holland
12	Frank Langstone		MP for Waimarino	18 April 1933	3 April 1934	Holland
12	Frank Langstone		MP for Waimarino	18 April 1933	3 April 1934	Savage
13	Tim Armstrong		MP for Christchurch East	3 April 1934	24 April 1935	Savage
14	Walter Nash		MP for Hutt	24 April 1935	14 April 1936	Savage
15	Clyde Carr		MP for Timaru	14 April 1936	30 March 1937	Savage
16	James Roberts		Vice-president of the Labour Party	30 March 1937	9 May 1950	Savage
16	James Roberts		Vice-president of the Labour Party	30 March 1937	9 May 1950	Fraser
17	Arnold Nordmeyer		MP for Brooklyn	9 May 1950	17 May 1955	Fraser
17	Arnold Nordmeyer		MP for Brooklyn	9 May 1950	17 May 1955	Nash
18	Mick Moohan		MP for Petone	17 May 1955	8 June 1960	Nash
19	Martyn Finlay		Vice-president of the Labour Party	8 June 1960	12 May 1964	Nash
19	Martyn Finlay		Vice-president of the Labour Party	8 June 1960	12 May 1964	Nordmeyer
20	Norman Kirk		MP for Lyttelton	12 May 1964	11 May 1966	Nordmeyer
20	Norman Kirk		MP for Lyttelton	12 May 1964	11 May 1966	Kirk
21	Norman Douglas		MP for Auckland Central	11 May 1966	5 May 1970	Kirk
22	Bill Rowling		MP for Buller	5 May 1970	8 May 1973	Kirk
23	Charles Bennett		Vice-president of the Labour Party	8 May 1973	11 May 1976	Kirk
23	Charles Bennett		Vice-president of the Labour Party	8 May 1973	11 May 1976	Rowling
24	Arthur Faulkner		MP for Roskill	11 May 1976	15 May 1979	Rowling
25	Jim Anderton		Auckland Regional Councillor	15 May 1979	8 September 1984	Rowling
25	Jim Anderton		Auckland Regional Councillor	15 May 1979	8 September 1984	Lange
26	Margaret Wilson		Vice-chair of the Association of University Teachers	8 September 1984	9 November 1987	Lange
27	Rex Jones		National Secretary of the EPMU	9 November 1987	5 September 1988	Lange
28	Ruth Dyson		Vice-president of the Labour Party	5 September 1988	18 April 1993	Lange
28	Ruth Dyson		Vice-president of the Labour Party	5 September 1988	18 April 1993	Palmer
28	Ruth Dyson		Vice-president of the Labour Party	5 September 1988	18 April 1993	Moore
29	Maryan Street		Vice-president of the Labour Party	18 April 1993	November 1995	Moore
29	Maryan Street		Vice-president of the Labour Party	18 April 1993	November 1995	Clark
30	Michael Hirschfeld		CEO of Mico Wakefield	November 1995	5 January 1999	Clark
31	Bob Harvey		Mayor of Waitakere	16 February 1999	19 November 2000	Clark
32	Mike Williams		1999 Election Campaign Manager	19 November 2000	2 March 2009	Clark
32	Mike Williams		1999 Election Campaign Manager	19 November 2000	2 March 2009	Goff
33	Andrew Little		National Secretary of the EPMU	2 March 2009	2 April 2011	Goff
34	Moira Coatsworth		Vice-president of the Labour Party	2 April 2011	26 November 2014	Goff
34	Moira Coatsworth		Vice-president of the Labour Party	2 April 2011	26 November 2014	Shearer
34	Moira Coatsworth		Vice-president of the Labour Party	2 April 2011	26 November 2014	Cunliffe
34	Moira Coatsworth		Vice-president of the Labour Party	2 April 2011	26 November 2014	Little
35	Nigel Haworth		President of University Staff of New Zealand	27 February 2015	11 September 2019	Little
35	Nigel Haworth		President of University Staff of New Zealand	27 February 2015	11 September 2019	Ardern
-	Tracey McLellan Acting		Vice-president of the Labour Party	11 September 2019	30 November 2019	Ardern
36	Claire Szabó		CEO of Habitat for Humanity	30 November 2019	5 November 2022	Ardern
37	Jill Day		Deputy Mayor of Wellington	5 November 2022	present	Ardern
37	Jill Day		Deputy Mayor of Wellington	5 November 2022	present	Hipkins
