= New Zealand Labour Party =

Centre-left political party in New Zealand

New Zealand Labour Party Rōpū Reipa o Aotearoa
- Leader: Chris Hipkins
- Deputy Leader: Carmel Sepuloni
- President: Jill Day
- General Secretary: Rob Salmond
- Founded: 7 July 1916; 110 years ago
- Merger of: Social Democratic Party; United Labour Party
- Headquarters: Fraser House, 160–162 Willis St, Wellington 6011
- Youth wing: Young Labour
- LGBT+ wing: Rainbow Labour
- Ideology: Social democracy
- Political position: Centre-left
- Regional affiliation: Network of Social Democracy in Asia
- International affiliation: Progressive Alliance; Socialist International (1952–2014)
- Colours: Red
- Slogan: Better starts now
- House of Representatives: 34 / 123
- Regional councillors: 3 / 132
- Local councillors: 19 / 718
- Mayors: 1 / 67
- Auckland local board members: 23 / 149

Website
- labour.org.nz

The New Zealand Labour Party, also known simply as Labour (Māori: Reipa), is a centre-left political party in New Zealand. The party's platform programme describes its founding principle as democratic socialism, while observers describe Labour as social democratic and pragmatic in practice. The party participates in the international Progressive Alliance. It is one of two major political parties in New Zealand, alongside its traditional rival, the National Party.

The New Zealand Labour Party formed in 1916 out of various socialist parties and trade unions. It is the country's oldest political party still in existence. Alongside the National Party, Labour has alternated in leading governments of New Zealand since the 1930s. As of 2020, there have been six periods of Labour government under 11 Labour prime ministers. The party has traditionally been supported by the working classes, Māori, Pasifika, and has had strongholds in inner cities and the Māori seats for much of its existence. Labour won the party vote in 71 out of 72 electorates in the 2020 election, making it overwhelmingly the most successful political party of the MMP era.

The party first came to power under prime ministers Michael Joseph Savage and Peter Fraser from 1935 to 1949, when it established New Zealand's welfare state. It governed from 1957 to 1960, and again from 1972 to 1975. In 1974, prime minister Norman Kirk died in office, which contributed to a decline in party support. However, Labour won the popular vote in 1978 and 1981, with the first-past-the-post voting system preventing them from governing. Up to the 1980s, the party advocated a strong role for governments in economic and social matters. When it governed from 1984 to 1990, Labour's emergent neoliberal faction had a strong influence; the party broke precedent and transformed the economy from a protectionist one through extensive deregulation. As part of Rogernomics, Labour privatised state assets and greatly reduced the role of the state, causing a party split in 1989. Labour prime minister David Lange also introduced New Zealand's nuclear-free policy. After a significant defeat in the 1990 election, Labour's neoliberal faction would largely defect from the party and form ACT New Zealand. Labour again became the largest party from 1999 to 2008, when it governed in coalition with, or based on negotiated support from, several minor parties; Helen Clark became the first Labour prime minister to secure a third full term in office. Clark's government was marked by the creation of Kiwibank, a state-owned banking corporation; strong opposition to the Iraq War; and the foreshore and seabed controversy, which caused disillusioned Māori Labour MPs to split and create the Māori Party.

In the 2017 election, the party, under Jacinda Ardern, returned to prominence with its best showing since the 2005 election, winning 36.9% of the party vote and 46 seats. It subsequently formed a minority coalition government with New Zealand First, with confidence and supply from the Green Party. In the 2020 election, Labour won in a landslide, winning an overall majority of 10 and 50.01% of the vote. In the 2023 election, Labour lost its majority to the National Party and subsequently returned to Opposition. Since 2023, Chris Hipkins serves as the party's leader, while Carmel Sepuloni is the deputy leader.

== History ==
=== Background ===
The founding of the New Zealand Labour Party, on 7 July 1916 in Wellington, brought together a number of earlier socialist groups advocating proportional representation, the abolition of the country quota, the recall of members of Parliament, as well as the nationalisation of production and exchange.

Despite the Labour Party's Wellington origins, the West Coast town of Blackball is regarded as the "spiritual home" of the party, because it was the site of a miners' strike in 1908 that led to the founding of the first nationwide federation of trade unions (the "Red Federation"). The Labour Party was established by trade unions, among other groups, and the party identifies itself as part of the wider labour movement in New Zealand. The Labour Party has long been identified with red, a political colour traditionally affiliated with socialism and the labour movement.

=== Formation (1901–1916) ===
Socialist; Party (1901)	Independent; Political; Labour; League (1905)
(independents)	Labour Party (original) (1910)
United Labour; Party (1912)
Social Democratic; Party (1913)	(remnants)
Labour Party (1916)

At the turn of the 20th century, the radical side of New Zealand working class politics was represented by the Socialist Party, founded in 1901. The more moderate leftists generally supported the Liberal Party. In 1905 a group of working-class politicians who were dissatisfied with the Liberal approach established the Independent Political Labour League (IPLL), which managed to win a seat in Parliament in the 1908 election. At the same time, moderates contested as "Lib-Lab" candidates, aligning with the Liberal Party while enjoying the endorsement of the labour movement. This established the basic dividing line in New Zealand's left-wing politics – the Socialists/IPLL tended to be revolutionary and militant, while the moderates focused instead on progressive reform. The process of unifying these sides into a single party was difficult, with tensions between different factions running strong.

In 1910 the Independent Political Labour League was relaunched as an organisation called the Labour Party (distinct from the modern party). Soon, however, the leaders of the new organisation decided that additional effort was needed to promote left-wing cooperation, and organised a "Unity Conference". The Socialists refused to attend, but several independent labour activists agreed. The United Labour Party (ULP) was born.

Soon afterward, the labour movement went through the 1912 Waihi miners' strike, a major industrial disturbance prompted by radicals in the union movement. The movement split over supporting or opposing the radicals, and in the end, the conservative Reform Party government of William Massey suppressed the strike by force. In the strike's aftermath, there was a major drive to end the divisions in the labour movement and to establish a united front. Accordingly, Walter Thomas Mills organised another Unity Conference, and this time the Socialists attended. The resulting group was named the Social Democratic Party.

Not all members of the United Labour Party accepted the new organisation, however, and some continued under their own banner. Gradually, however, the differences between the Social Democrats and the ULP Remnant broke down, and in 1915 they formed a unified caucus – both to oppose Reform better and to differentiate themselves from the Liberals. A year later yet another gathering took place. This time, all major factions of the labour movement agreed to unite, forming the Labour Party as it is today.

==== Electoral record of constituent parties pre–1916 Labour ====
Term		Electorate	Party	Elected MPs
1908–1910	17th	Wellington East	Ind. Labour League	David McLaren
1910–1911	Changed allegiance to:		Labour	David McLaren
1911–1912	18th	Wellington South	Labour	Alfred Hindmarsh
1912–1914	Changed allegiance to:		United Labour	Alfred Hindmarsh
1914–1916	19th	Wellington South	United Labour	Alfred Hindmarsh
1911–1914	18th	Grey Lynn	Labour	John Payne
1914–1916	19th	Grey Lynn	Independent Labour	John Payne
1916	Changed allegiance to:		Independent	John Payne
1911–1913	18th	Otaki	Labour	John Robertson
1913–1914	Changed allegiance to:		Social Democrat	John Robertson
1911–1912	18th	Wanganui	Independent Labour	Bill Veitch
1912–1914	Changed allegiance to:		United Labour	Bill Veitch
1914–1916	19th	Wanganui	United Labour	Bill Veitch
1916	Changed allegiance to:		Independent	Bill Veitch
1913–1914	18th	Grey	Social Democrat	Paddy Webb
1914–1916	19th	Grey	Social Democrat	Paddy Webb
1913–1914	18th	Lyttelton	Social Democrat	James McCombs
1914–1916	19th	Lyttelton	Social Democrat	James McCombs
1914–1916	19th	Dunedin North	United Labour	Andrew Walker

=== Early years (1916–1935) ===
Almost immediately, the new Labour Party became involved in the acrimonious debate about conscription which arose during World War I. The party strongly opposed conscription, and several leading members – Peter Fraser, Harry Holland, Bob Semple and Paddy Webb – were jailed and expelled from Parliament for their stand against the war. The loss of leadership threatened to seriously destabilise the party, but the party survived. (Fraser, Semple and Webb later supported conscription in World War II.)

In its first real electoral test as a united party, the 1919 election, Labour won eight seats – the party's quick success shocked many conservatives. The eight seats compared with 47 for the governing Reform Party and 21 for the Liberal Party.

Although Labour had split with its more militant faction (which went on to form various socialist parties), it maintained what were at the time radical socialist policies. Labour's 'Usehold' policy on land was, in essence, the replacement of freehold tenure by a system of perpetual lease from the state, with all land-transfer conducted through the state (the full nationalisation of farmland). This policy proved unpopular with voters, and Labour dropped it, along with other more radical policies, in the course of the 1920s.

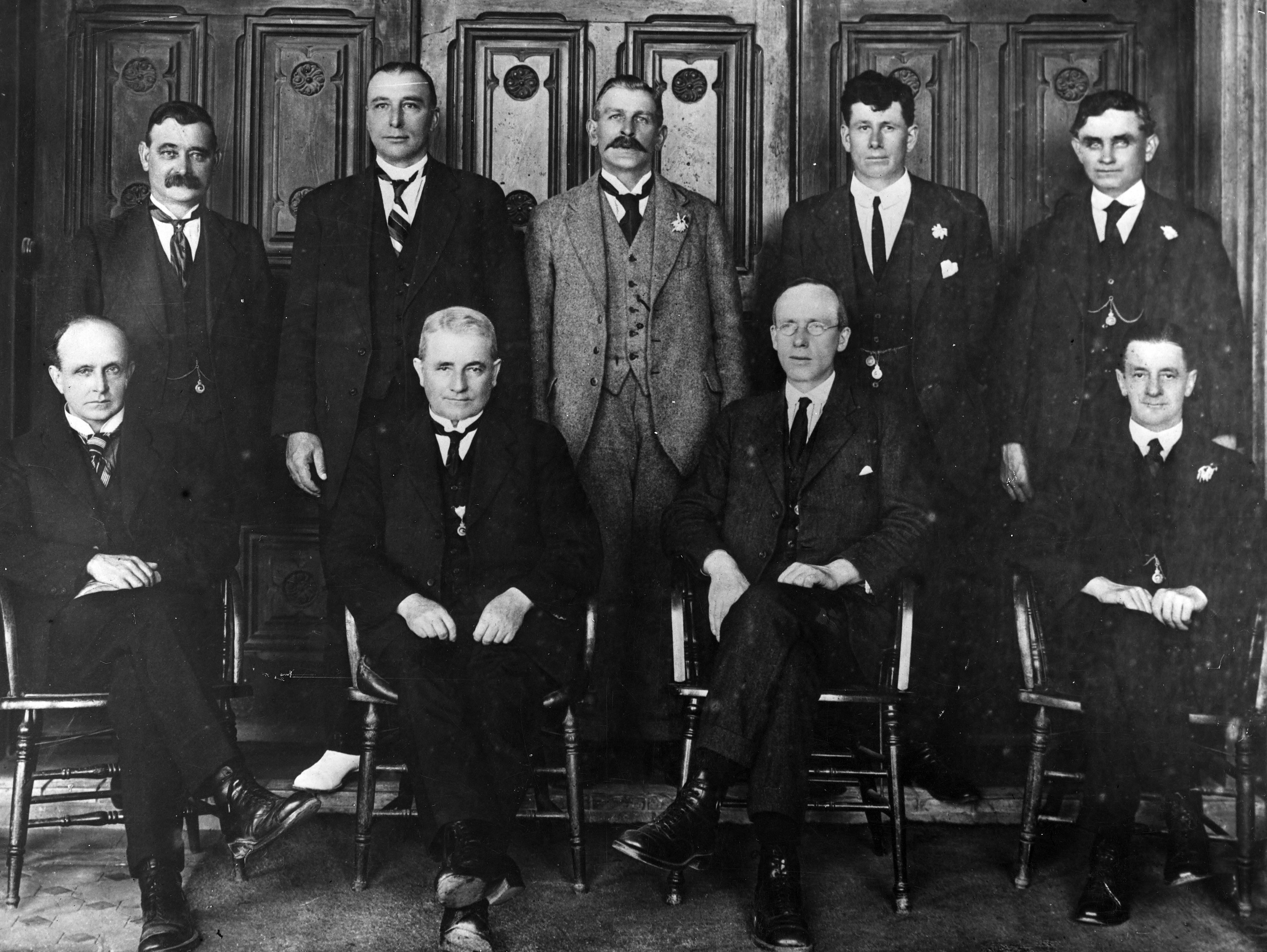
Members of the Labour parliamentary caucus, 1922. Prominent members are Harry Holland (seated, left of centre), Peter Fraser (seated, right of centre) and Michael Joseph Savage (back row, rightmost).

In the 1922 election, Labour more than doubled its number of seats, winning seventeen. In the 1925 election, it declined somewhat but had the consolation of soon overtaking the Liberals as the second-largest party. Labour leader Harry Holland became the official Leader of the Opposition on 16 June 1926, after the Eden by-election on 15 April elected Rex Mason (Labour) to replace James Parr (Reform), who had resigned. After the 1928 election, however, the party was left in an advantageous position – the Reform Party had 28 seats and the new United Party (a revival of the Liberals) had 27 seats, and neither could govern without Labour support. Labour chose to back United, the party closest to its own views – this put an end to five terms (1912–1928) of Reform Party government.

In the early 1930s the rigours of the Great Depression brought Labour considerable popularity, but also caused tension between Labour and the United Party. In 1931 United passed a number of economic measures which Labour deemed hostile to workers, and the agreement between the two parties collapsed. United then formed a coalition government with Reform, making Labour the Opposition. The coalition retained power in the 1931 election, but gradually, the public became highly dissatisfied with its failure to resolve the country's economic problems. Harry Holland died in 1933 and his deputy, Michael Joseph Savage, became the Labour Party parliamentary leader. In the 1935 election, the Labour Party gained a significant majority, gaining 53 seats to the coalition's 19, and returned to government.

Several of the early Labour Party stalwarts were Australian-born: Alfred Hindmarsh, Harry Holland, Michael Joseph Savage, Bob Semple, Paddy Webb, Bill Parry and later Jerry Skinner, Mabel Howard, Hugh Watt, Jim Edwards and Dorothy Jelicich.

=== First Government (1935–1949) ===
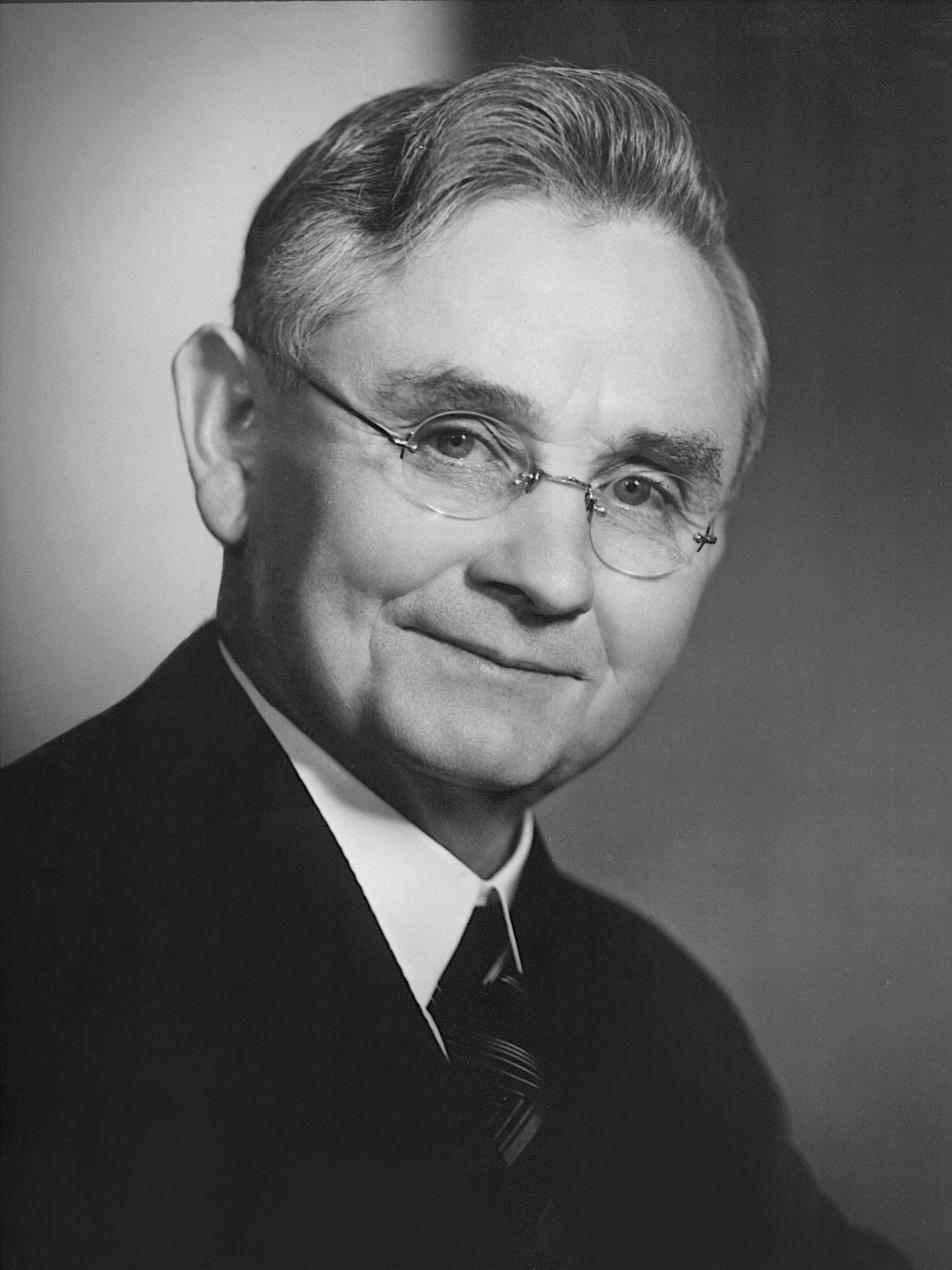
Michael Joseph Savage, the first Prime Minister from the Labour Party

Party leader Michael Joseph Savage became prime minister on 6 December 1935, marking the beginning of Labour's first term in office. The new government quickly set about implementing a number of significant reforms, including a reorganisation of the social-welfare system and setting up the state housing scheme. Workers also benefited from the introduction of the forty-hour week, and legislation making it easier for unions to negotiate on their behalf. Savage himself was highly popular with the working classes, and his portrait could be found on walls in many houses around the country. At this time the Labour Party pursued an alliance with the Māori Rātana movement.

The parliamentary opposition, meanwhile, attacked the Labour Party's more left-wing policies and accused it of undermining free enterprise and hard work. In May 1936, months after Labour's first general election win, the Reform Party and the United Party took their coalition to the next step, agreeing to merge with each other. The combined organisation, named the National Party, would be Labour's main rival in future years.

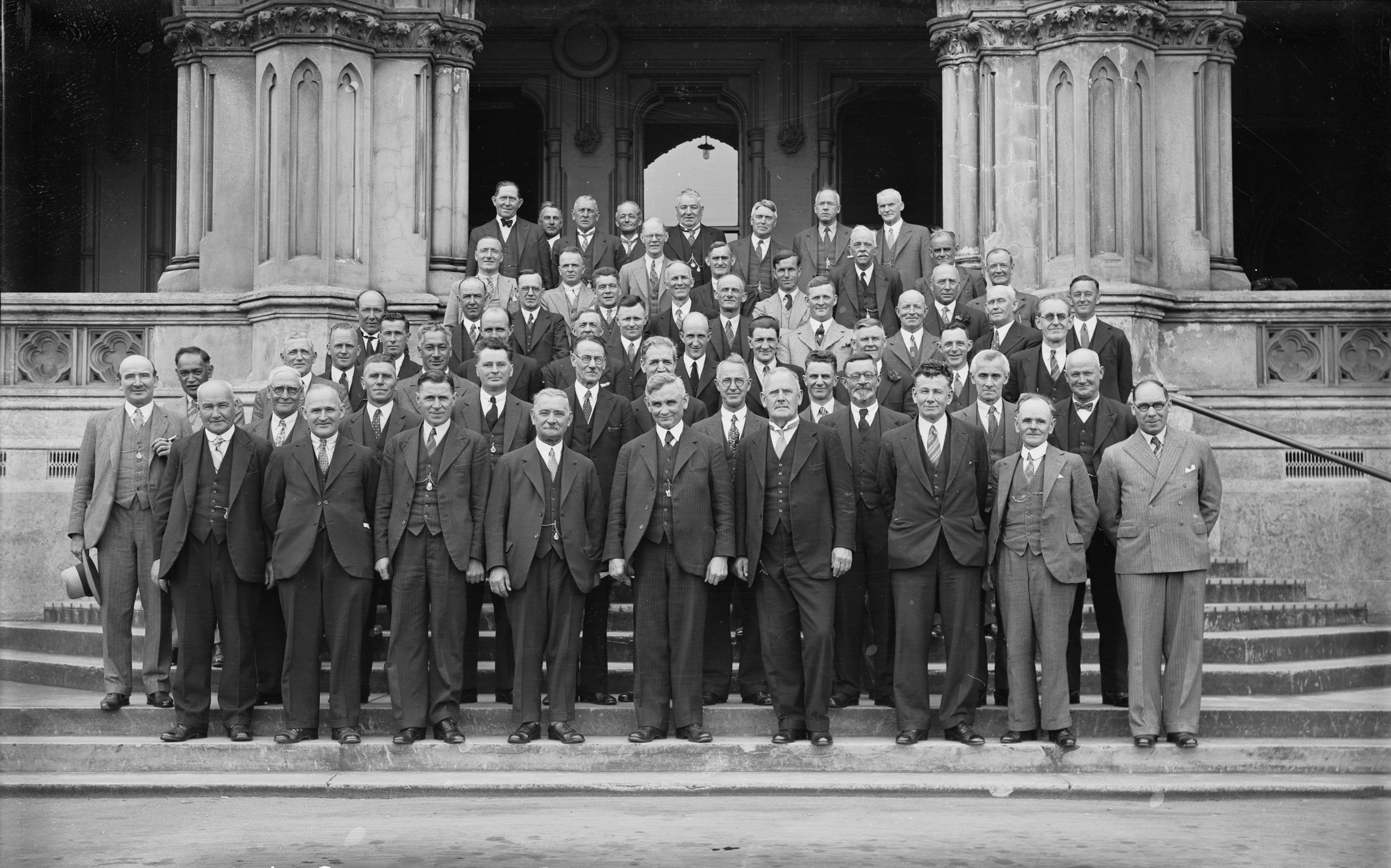
Members of the First Labour Government on the steps of the Parliamentary Library in Wellington, 1935

Labour also faced opposition within its own ranks. While the Labour Party had been explicitly socialist at its inception, it had gradually drifted away from its earlier radicalism. The death of the party's former leader, the "doctrinaire" Harry Holland, had marked a significant turning-point in the party's history. Some within the party, however, were displeased about the changing focus of the party. Most notably, John A. Lee. Lee, whose views were a mixture of socialism and social credit theory, emerged as a vocal critic of the party's leadership, accusing it of behaving autocratically and of betraying the party's rank and file. After a long and bitter dispute, the party executive expelled Lee from the party in 1940. He subsequently established his own breakaway Democratic Labour Party.

Savage died in 1940 and Peter Fraser, who became Labour's longest-serving prime minister, replaced him. Fraser became best-known as New Zealand's head of government for most of World War II. In the post-war period, however, ongoing shortages and industrial problems cost Labour considerable popularity, and the National Party, under Sidney Holland, gained ground, although Labour was able to win the 1943 and 1946 elections. Eventually, in the 1949 election, Labour suffered electoral defeat.

Fraser died shortly afterward, and was replaced by Walter Nash, the long-serving minister of finance. It would be some time before Labour would return to power; Nash lacked the charisma of his predecessors, and National won considerable support for opposing the "industrial anarchy" of the 1951 waterfront dispute. In the 1957 election, however, Labour won a narrow majority of two seats, and returned to office.

=== Second Government (1957–1960) ===
Nash, Labour's third prime minister, took office in late 1957. Upon coming to power, Labour decided that drastic measures were needed to address balance-of-payments concerns. This resulted in the highly unpopular 1958 "Black Budget" of Arnold Nordmeyer, the new minister of finance, which raised taxes on alcohol, cigarettes, cars, and petrol. It is widely thought to have doomed the party to defeat despite the economy rejuvenating less than a year after the adoption of the Black Budget. In the 1960 election, the National Party returned to power.

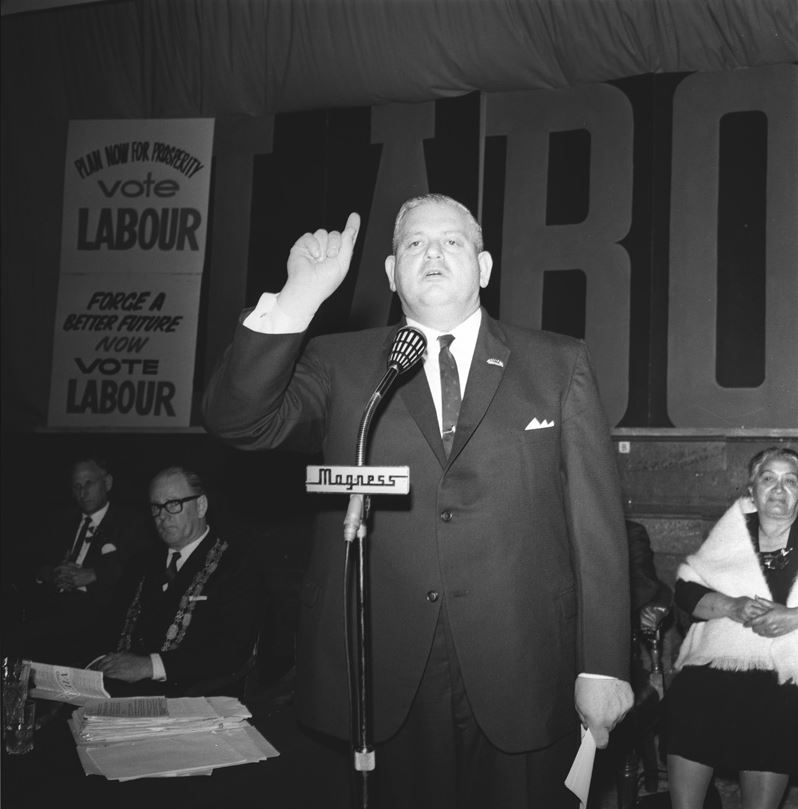
Leader Norman Kirk opening Labour's election campaign in 1966

The elderly Nash retired in 1963, suffering from ill health. Nordmeyer replaced him, but the taint of the Black Budget ensured that Nordmeyer did not have any appreciable success in reversing the party's fortunes. In 1965 the leadership went to the younger Norman Kirk, who many believed would revitalise the party. Labour suffered defeat again in the next two elections, but in the 1972 election, the party gained a significant majority over its rival.

=== Third Government (1972–1975) ===
Kirk proved an energetic prime minister and introduced a number of new policies. His foreign-policy stances included strong criticism of nuclear-weapons testing and of South Africa's apartheid system. However, Kirk suffered from poor health, worsened by his refusal to slow the pace of his work. In 1974 Kirk was taken ill and died. Bill Rowling replaced him, but did not have the same electoral appeal – in the 1975 election, Labour was heavily defeated by the National Party, then led by Robert Muldoon.

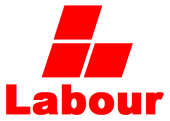
Party logo from the mid-1960s until the early 1990s

Rowling remained the leader of the Labour Party for some time after his defeat. In the 1978 election and the 1981 election Labour won a larger share of the vote than National but failed to win an equivalent number of seats. This led to a very heated debate on New Zealand's electoral system, and precipitated the introduction of mixed-member proportional representation (MMP) fifteen years later. Rowling himself was compared by media unfavourably to Muldoon, and did not cope well with Muldoon's aggressive style. In 1983 Rowling was replaced as parliamentary leader by David Lange, whom the parliamentary caucus perceived as more charismatic. In the snap election of 1984, Labour decisively defeated the National Party.

=== Fourth Government (1984–1990) ===
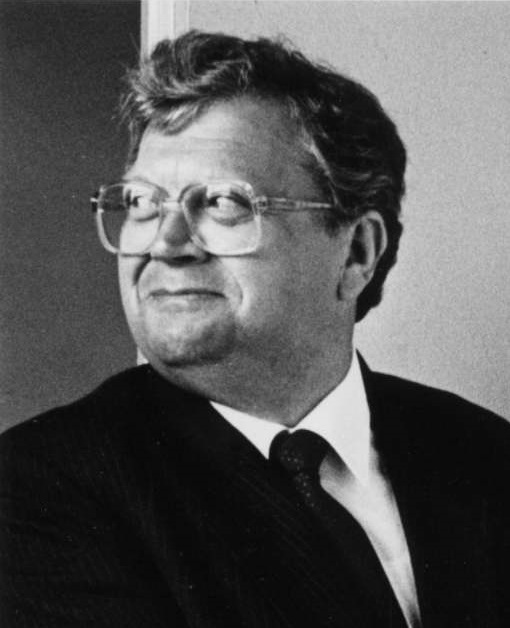
The free-market policies of David Lange's government deviated sharply from those of previous Labour governments.

When the Fourth Labour Government came into power it uncovered a fiscal crisis that had been largely hidden by the outgoing Third National Government. Government debt was skyrocketing, due largely to the costs of borrowing to maintain a fixed exchange-rate. When the result of the election became clear, Lange asked Muldoon to devalue the New Zealand dollar, which Muldoon refused to do, resulting in a constitutional crisis and precipitating some of the changes in the Constitution Act 1986.

The economic-policy agenda of the Fourth Labour Government differed significantly from previous Labour governments. The minister of finance, Roger Douglas, supported neoliberal theories, and sought to implement sweeping free-market reforms (dubbed "Rogernomics") to the economy and to the tax system. This involved floating the New Zealand dollar, cutting government spending, reducing taxes and removing almost all industry subsidies. The government also revolutionised New Zealand's foreign policy, making the country a nuclear-free zone, which resulted in suspension from the ANZUS alliance. Labour liberalised immigration policy and promoted migration from Asia.

Other innovations during the term of the Fourth Labour Government included extending the jurisdiction of the Waitangi Tribunal back to 1840 (the date of the signing of the Treaty of Waitangi); the Homosexual Law Reform Act 1986, which legalised homosexual relations; and the Bill of Rights Act, which enumerated civil and political rights. Throughout its first term (1984–1987), the Labour government remained largely unified behind the enacted radical financial, economic and social policy reforms, but early signs of dissension began to appear before the 1987 election.

In 1987 Labour won another considerable election victory against the National Party, while ruptures over the direction of policy remained concealed. Labour took votes in affluent seats where it had never come remotely close to winning even at high-tide elections. In the biggest shock of all, it came within 400 votes of taking the blue-ribbon seat of Remuera off National. At the same time, Labour suffered negative swings in more traditional seats. The government's second term (1987–1990), with an increased Labour majority won on the back of Lange's anti-nuclear stance, saw emerging divisions over economic policy arising within Cabinet. Ministers debated the extent and pace of further reforms, and there was disillusion among party members and supporters loyal to Labour's left-wing tradition. The Council of Trade Unions criticised the Labour Party. One vocal member of Parliament critical of government policy, former Party President Jim Anderton, departed to establish the NewLabour Party, which later became a part of the left-wing Alliance Party. At the same time Roger Douglas and Lange fought intermittent battles inside Cabinet, with Douglas wanting to expand his economic programme dramatically. Lange strongly opposed a flat-tax proposal from Douglas and moved to sack him, resulting in political clashes throughout 1988 and the departure of Douglas from the Cabinet in December 1988. After the Labour Caucus re-elected Douglas to Cabinet on 3 August 1989, Lange resigned from office himself (8 August 1989), interpreting Douglas's reappointment as a vote of no confidence in his leadership.

Geoffrey Palmer became the new prime minister. However, Palmer failed to rebuild the shattered remnants of Lange's government and in September 1990, Mike Moore replaced him. Despite Moore's ascension somewhat salvaging poll-ratings, Labour suffered its worst defeat since it first took office in 1935 (losing twenty-eight seats) as voters flung it into the political wilderness in a massive landslide. National swept to power, seemingly repudiating the Lange/Douglas program, but then engaged in even more radical policies than Labour had contemplated. Political disillusionment caused by both governments was to be instrumental in the later adoption of mixed-member proportional representation (MMP) in 1993 (implemented in 1996).

Moore himself, despite recovering sixteen seats at the 1993 election, was replaced by Helen Clark in December 1993. Clark led the party in opposition to the National government for six years under the administrations of Jim Bolger (1993–1997) and Jenny Shipley (1997–1999). During this period in opposition, the party made a measured repudiation of Rogernomics, although it has never returned to its original leftist roots (Labour's contemporary position is left-of-centre). When the 1996 election, the first conducted under the MMP electoral system, gave the balance of power to the centrist New Zealand First party, many believed that Labour would return to power, but in the end New Zealand First formed a coalition arrangement with the National Party. Despite initially appearing coherent, the coalition became increasingly unstable and eventually collapsed, leaving the National Party to govern as a minority government from 1998 to 1999.

=== Fifth Government (1999–2008) ===
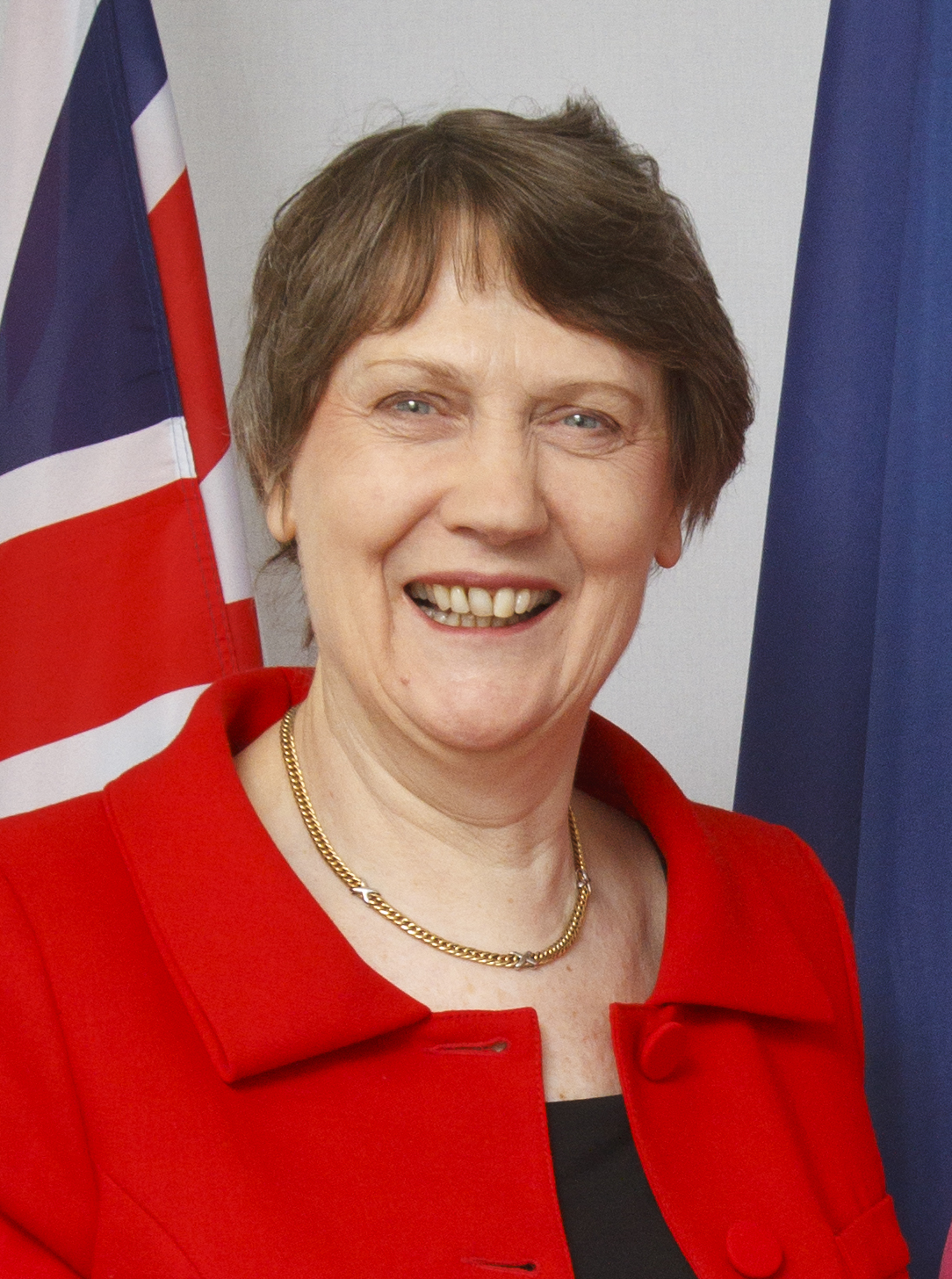
Helen Clark, Labour Prime Minister from 1999 to 2008

After the 1999 election, a minority coalition government of Labour and the Alliance took power, supported by the Green Party with Helen Clark becoming New Zealand's second female prime minister. This government, while undertaking a number of reforms, was not particularly radical when compared to previous Labour governments, and maintained a high level of popularity. The Alliance, however, fell in popularity and split internally. Clark cited the Alliance split as one of the reasons for calling the 2002 election several months early; Labour won comfortably.

Policies of the Fifth Labour Government included the KiwiSaver scheme, the Working for Families package, increasing the minimum wage 5% a year, interest-free student loans, the establishment of district health boards, the introduction of a number of tax credits, overhauling the secondary-school qualifications system by introducing the NCEA, and the introduction of fourteen weeks' parental leave. Labour also supported the Civil Union Act 2004, which legalised civil unions for same-sex and opposite-sex couples.

The foreign policy of the Fifth Labour Government strongly reflected liberal internationalist doctrine, with a particular emphasis on promoting democracy and human rights, advocating for antimilitarism and disarmament, and encouragement of free trade. In 2003, the government opposed New Zealand military action in the Iraq War.

In early 2004 Labour came under attack in the foreshore and seabed controversy. Significant internal tensions within the party eventually culminated in the resignation of junior minister Tariana Turia and her establishment of the new Māori Party.

Party logo in 2008

Following the 2005 election, Labour formed a minority coalition with the Progressive Party (breakaway party of the old Alliance), and entered into complex confidence and supply agreements with the centrist United Future and populist New Zealand First parties, which gave each party's leader a ministerial portfolio, while the support parties remained outside the Cabinet. A limited support agreement also linked Labour with the Green Party, giving certain policy concessions to the Greens in return for abstention on confidence-and-supply votes. Labour lost power when the National Party soundly defeated it in the 2008 election.

=== In opposition (2008–2017) ===
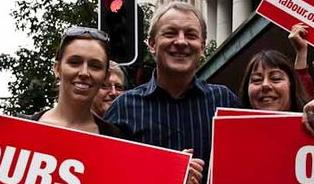
Then-leader Phil Goff with future leader Jacinda Ardern and Carol Beaumont at a 2010 anti-mining march in Auckland

Following the loss to the National Party in the November 2008 election, Helen Clark stood down as leader of the party – Phil Goff succeeded her (serving from 2008–2011). Labour had a relatively high turnover of four leaders during its most recent term in opposition; journalist Nicky Hager has attributed this to Labour's reaction to changes within public media and the political environment. Goff led Labour into a second electoral defeat in 2011 and was succeeded by David Shearer, who led the Labour parliamentary from 2011 to 2013.

Shearer resigned after losing the confidence of caucus. David Cunliffe (2013–2014) assumed the leadership after the 2013 leadership election in which, under new rules, members and unions held 60% of the vote. Most of the Labour caucus disliked Cunliffe, but he had strong support from the party membership. In the leadership contest he won first-preference votes from only one-third of Labour MPs.

Cunliffe's tenure as leader quickly became mired in internal disputes and falling poll-ratings. Labour went on to suffer its worst electoral reversal since 1922 at the 2014 election, Cunliffe opted to resign after initially wishing to re-contest the leadership. His replacement, Andrew Little (2014–2017), then resigned in 2017 following new polling showing the party sinking to a record low result of 24%, with internal voices hoping that rising star Jacinda Ardern would take over in his stead.

The caucus confirmed Ardern as the new Labour leader (2017–2023). After Ardern's election to its parliamentary leadership Labour rose dramatically in opinion polls. By late August they had risen to 43% in one poll (having been 24% under Little's leadership), as well as managing to overtake National in opinion polls for the first time in over a decade.

=== Sixth Government (2017–2023) ===
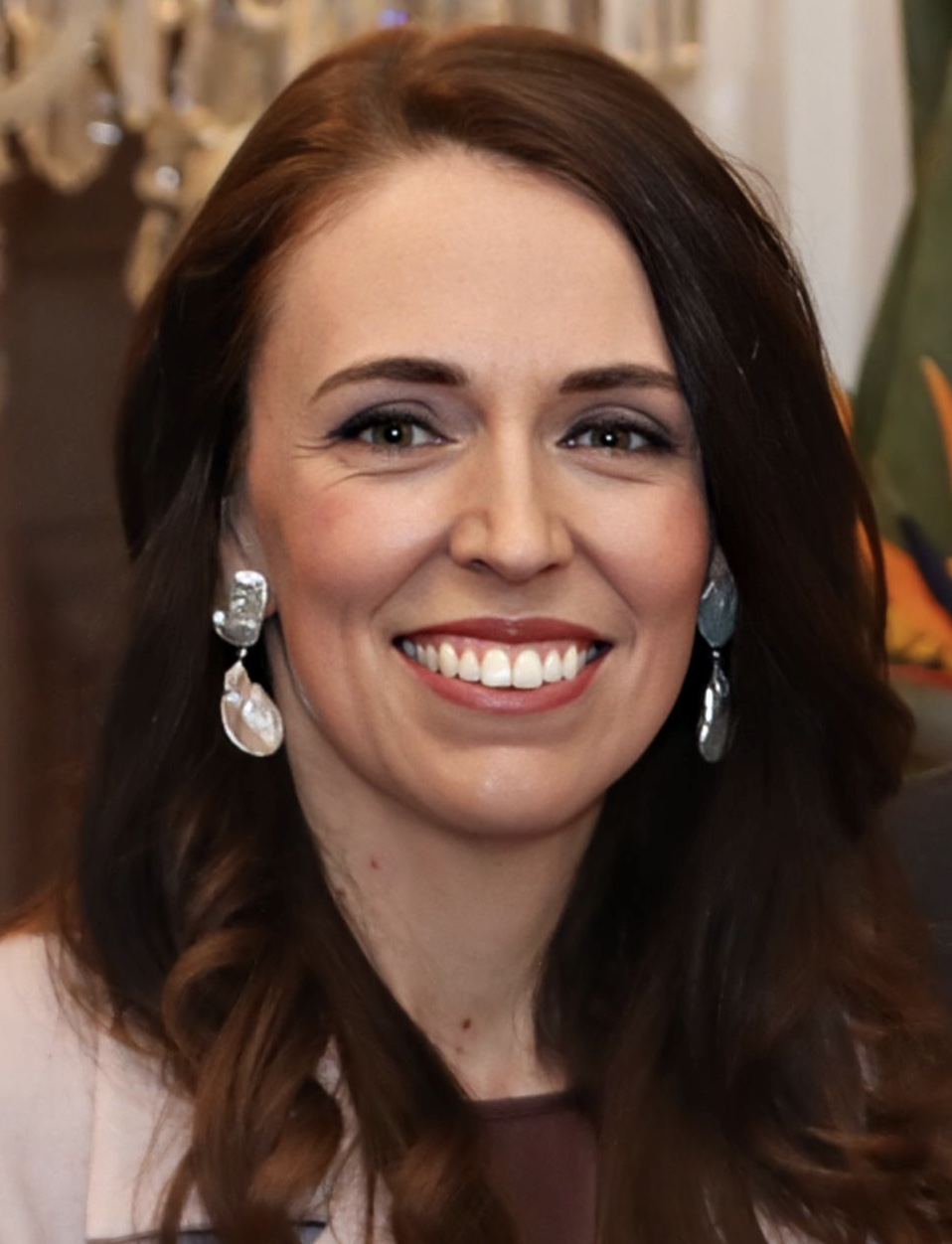
Jacinda Ardern, Labour Prime Minister from 2017 to 2023

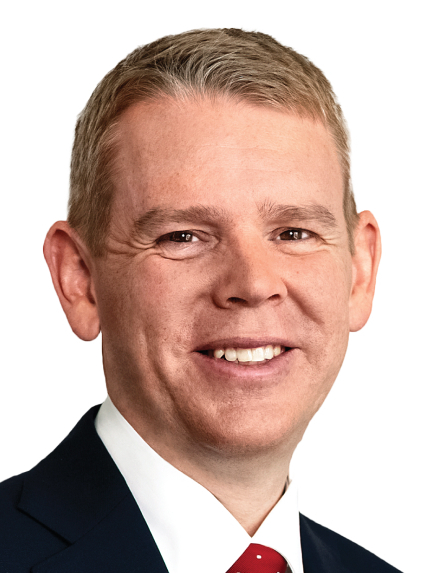
Chris Hipkins, Labour Prime Minister in 2023

During the 2017 election, Labour gained 36.6% of the party vote and increased its presence in the House of Representatives to 46 seats, making it the second-largest party in Parliament. On 19 October 2017, New Zealand First leader Winston Peters announced that his party would form a coalition government with Labour, citing changing international and internal economic circumstances as the reasoning behind his decision, coupled with a belief that a Labour government was best-placed to handle the social and economic welfare of New Zealanders in a global environment that was undergoing rapid and "seismic" change. This coalition, combined with confidence and supply from the Green Party, saw Labour return to government for the first time since 2008. Ardern became prime minister, with Peters as her deputy.

The Labour government pledged to eliminate child poverty, make tertiary education free, reduce immigration by 20,000 to 30,000, decriminalise abortion, and make all rivers swimmable within 10 years. Notable policies, programmes and legislation during the 2017–2020 term included scrapping the previous National Government's national standards in schools and charter schools, the KiwiBuild affordable housing programme, restricting oil and gas exploration, banning semi-automatic firearms, restoring voting rights for prisoners serving less than three years and decriminalising abortion. The Labour Government also adopted an elimination approach towards the COVID-19 pandemic in New Zealand, instituting lockdowns and closing the border. Both Labour and Prime Minister Ardern attracted high domestic poll ratings due to their initial COVID-19 responses in 2020.

In mid-July 2020, the Serious Fraud Office announced that it was investigating donations made to the Labour Party by two Chinese businessmen during the 2017 general election. Labour Party President Claire Szabó announced that the party would co-operate with the investigation. The 2017–2020 term saw several ministerial resignations for various indiscretions, notably Phil Twyford, Clare Curran, Meka Whaitiri and David Clark.

In the 2020 election, Labour gained 50% of the party vote and increased its presence in the House of Representatives to 65 seats, marking the first time that a party has won enough seats to govern alone since the introduction of the MMP system in 1996. Described as a "landslide" victory in which the party won the party vote in "virtually every single electorate", Labour is believed to have gained support from swing voters, many of whom had previously voted for National under John Key. On 20 October, Newshub reported that Ardern was not intending to forge a formal coalition with the Green Party but was exploring the possibility of a lower-level support arrangement due to Labour's large parliamentary majority. Following prolonged negotiations, the Green Party agreed to enter into a cooperation agreement with the Labour Party on 31 October and received two ministerial portfolios in return. Despite this landslide victory Labour faced criticism from economists due to the government's lack of action on New Zealand's housing affordability crisis, despite it being a key feature of Labour's 2017 election campaign.

Notable policies, programmes and legislations during the 2020–2023 term included the Clean Car rebate programme, making the Māori New Year Matariki a public holiday, banning conversion therapy, replacing the district health boards with a national health service called Te Whatu Ora (Health New Zealand), passing smokefree legislation banning the sale of tobacco to anyone born after 1 January 2009, repealing "three strikes" legislation, and banning live animal exports. In terms of foreign policy, the Labour Government supported Ukraine following the 2022 Russian invasion of Ukraine, sanctioned Russia, signed free trade agreements with both the United Kingdom and European Union, and advocated restraint in response to the Gaza war.

The Government also implemented several co-governance arrangements in the public sector including entrenching Māori wards and constituencies in local government, the Three Waters reform programme, and creating Te Aka Whai Ora (the Māori Health Authority). Following a major COVID-19 outbreak in August 2021, the Labour Government abandoned its elimination strategy and gradually eased lockdown, border restrictions, vaccine mandates and masking requirements between 2021 and 2022. During that period, growing opposition to lockdowns and vaccine mandates led to the emergence of several anti-vaccination protest groups including Voices for Freedom and Brian Tamaki's The Freedoms and Rights Coalition, culminating in the 2022 occupation of Parliament's grounds.

On 19 January 2023, Ardern announced her resignation as party leader and therefore prime minister. In the resultant leadership election Chris Hipkins was the only candidate and was confirmed as the new Labour leader on 22 January. Hipkins' premiership saw a shift in focus to "cost of living issues" and a "policy bonfire" that saw the scrapping or revision of several Government policies and initiatives including the planned merger of public broadcasters RNZ and TVNZ, a biofuel mandate, lowering the voting age to 16 years and the Clean Car Upgrade programme. Hipkins' government also responded to two natural disasters, the 2023 Auckland Anniversary Weekend floods and Cyclone Gabrielle, which devastated Auckland and the east coast of the North Island. Prior to the dissolution of Parliament, the Labour Government passed two laws as part of efforts to replace the Resource Management Act 1991.

The 2020–2023 term saw the expulsion of Labour MP Gaurav Sharma, the resignations of ministers Stuart Nash and Kiri Allan, and ministers Michael Wood and Jan Tinetti being disciplined by Parliament's privileges committee. The 2023 general election, held on 14 October 2023, saw the Labour government lose its majority to the opposition National Party. Based on final results, Labour's share of the party vote declined to 26.91% while its share of Parliamentary seats dropped to 34.

=== In opposition, 2023–present ===
In early November 2023, caretaker Prime Minister Chris Hipkins was re-elected as leader of the Labour Party and Carmel Sepuloni was elected as deputy leader. In early 2024, three veteran Labour MPs Kelvin Davis, Rino Tirikatene and Grant Robertson resigned from Parliament, allowing Shanan Halbert, Tracey McLellan and Glen Bennett to re-enter Parliament via the party list. In April 2024, Labour called for New Zealand to recognise Palestinian statehood. In February 2024, two Labour MPs questioned whether New Zealand should be entering the non-nuclear component of the AUKUS, with foreign affairs spokesperson Phil Twyford describing it as an "offensive warfighting alliance against China." At the Labour Party's annual conference in 2024, held between 29 November and 1 December, Chris Hipkins announced that under a Labour government, New Zealand would not be a part of AUKUS, saying that any government he leads would "restore New Zealand's proudly independent foreign policy."

During the 54th New Zealand parliamentary term, several private member's bills by Labour MPs were passed with majority support. On 11 October 2024, Deborah Russell's bill exempting victims of domestic violence from waiting a mandatory two years to seek a divorce was passed into law. On 12 March 2025, Camilla Belich's bill designating the withholding of employees' wages as theft was passed into law with the support of the Green, Māori and New Zealand First parties (63 votes). On 20 August 2025, Belich's bill banning employers from imposing gag orders on workers talking about their salaries passed into law with the support of the Green, Māori, and National parties. That same day, Tracey McLellan's bill extending the range of protections for those giving evidence of sexual assaults or family harm in the Family Court passed into law with the support of all parties.

On 20 October 2025, Hipkins and finance spokesperson Barbara Edmonds unveiled the party's "NZ Future Fund" policy, which would complement the New Zealand Superannuation Fund established by the Fifth Labour Government. The NZ Future Fund seeks to stimulate economic investment in New Zealand and is modelled after Singapore's Temasek fund. On 28 October, Hipkins announced that Labour, if elected into government, would introduce a capital gains tax to subsidise three free doctors' visits a year. The proposed capital gains tax would tax 28% of property transactions excluding the family home and farms.

On 6 November, Hipkins and health spokesperson Ayesha Verrall announced a policy proposing free cervical cancer screenings for all women aged between 25 and 69 years. The proposed cervical screening scheme would cost NZ$21.6 million and be funded through health baselines.

On 29 January 2026, Labour and the governing National party agreed to co-sponsor new legislation targeting modern slavery despite opposition from the ACT party.

== Ideology ==
The New Zealand Labour Party's founding 1916 policy objectives called for "the socialisation of the means of production, distribution and exchange", including state ownership of major parts of the economy, and increased rights for workers. While the socialist objective attracted support from some members, it also became a target for opponents who portrayed Labour as an extremist party. In the aftermath of World War II, Labour prioritised national unity over societal divisions, but after their defeat in 1949, many party members perceived the socialist objective as outdated and a hindrance to electoral success, leading to its abolition in 1951. The party transformed into a moderate social-democratic party, focusing on reform within the democratic framework while maintaining ties with trade unions.

By the late 1980s, the Labour Party had undergone significant ideological changes, leading to policies that frequently conflicted with the goals and interests of the union movement. The Labour Government of the 1980s deviated sharply from a social-democratic path; in a series of economic reforms, the government removed a swathe of regulations and subsidies, privatised state assets, and introduced corporate practices to state services. The Labour's Party also began to embrace the Third Way during the 1990s.

The party's constitution and platform programme maintains its founding principle as democratic socialism, while observers describe Labour's policies as social-democratic and pragmatic in practice. From the 1990s onwards, Labour has again aimed to use the power of the state to try to achieve a "fairer and more equal society", based on a mixed economy in which both the state and private enterprise play a part. Subsequently, the party has also been described as embracing certain social-liberal policies.

=== Principles ===
According to its current constitution, the party accepts democratic socialist principles, including:

- The management of New Zealand's natural resources for the benefit of all, including future generations.
- Equal access to all social, economic, cultural, political, and legal spheres, regardless of wealth or social position.
- Co-operation as the main governing factor in economic relations, to ensure a just distribution of wealth.
- Universal rights to dignity, self-respect, and the opportunity to work.
- The right to wealth and property, subject to the provisos of regarding people as always more important than property and the obligations of the state to ensure a just distribution of wealth.
- Honouring Te Tiriti o Waitangi / the Treaty of Waitangi as the founding document of New Zealand.
- The promotion of peace and social justice throughout the world by international co-operation.
- Equality in human rights regardless of race, sex, marital status, sexual orientation, gender identity, age, religious faith, political belief or disability.

=== Voter base ===
Historically, the party drew upon a stable sectional voter base comprising the urban working class, predominantly manual labourers and trade unionists. From the 1930s onwards, Labour has increasingly positioned itself as a broad-based party by responding and adapting to different social and economic problems and changing demographics (appealing to an expanding migrant population and a diversified ethnic, social make-up). Beginning in the 1980s, there was a shift away from class-issues and towards the promotion of individual freedoms, particularly for members of disadvantaged groups such as women, Māori and the LGBTQ+ community. The modern party's core support base lies among young people, urban workers, civil servants, and minorities (particularly the Māori and Pasifika communities).

== Organisation ==
=== Party structure ===
==== General and special branches ====
Party membership is tied into geographically-based branches in each parliamentary electorate. General branches must consist of at least 10 members aged 15 or over. Members may also form special branches where they have a special community of interest (such as university students and academics, young people, women, Māori people, Pasifika, multicultural groups, people with disabilities, the LGBT community, and industrial workers). Influential branches include Princes Street Labour and Vic Labour (the Victoria University of Wellington branch).

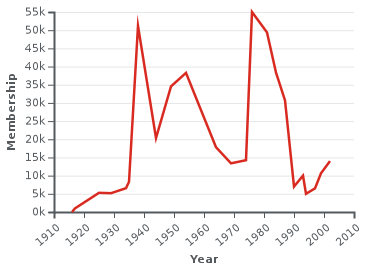
As this graph (compiled from multiple sources spanning 1917 to 2002) shows, the party's membership has fluctuated greatly, broadly in line with the terms of office of Labour governments.

Membership figures are rarely released to the public. Full (non-affiliate) membership is known to have peaked at 55,000 in 1976. During the 1980s and 1990s, party membership plummeted to levels not seen since before the First Labour Government. This decline might be attributed to disillusionment on the part of some members with the economic policies of the Fourth Labour Government ("Rogernomics"). Membership figures began to recover under Helen Clark's leadership, with 14,000 members recorded in 2002.

==== Conference, councils and committees ====
Delegates from all branches in the electorate, together with delegates from affiliated unions, make up the Labour Electorate Committee (LEC). The LEC is responsible for party organisation in the electorate. The party is divided into six regional areas, which each year convene a Regional Conference. Policy and other matters are debated and passed onto the Annual Conference.

The Annual Conference (called Congress in election years) is the supreme governing body of the Labour Party when it is in session. All constituent bodies of the party are entitled to send delegates to Annual Conference.

The New Zealand Council is the Labour Party's governing executive. It ensures that the party is governed effectively according to its constitution. The NZ Council consists of the president, two senior vice presidents (one of which must be Māori), three vice presidents (representing women, affiliates, and Pacific Islanders), seven regional representatives, one Policy Council representative, three Caucus representatives, and the general secretary.

The Policy Council, responsible for the development of the policy platform and election manifesto, is elected for a three-year term following each general election. The party structure also provides for Special Interest Group Councils: representing the affiliates, women's issues, Māori issues, Pacific Islands, primary industries, local government, and youth.

==== Caucus and parliamentary leadership ====
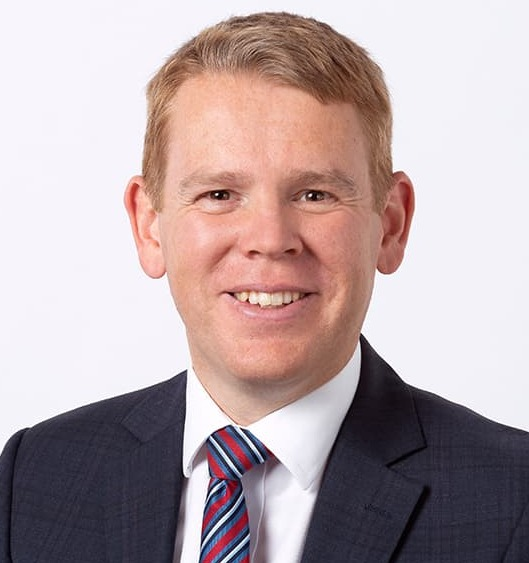
Leader Chris Hipkins (in 2022)

The elected members representing the Labour Party in the House of Representatives meet as the Parliamentary Labour Party, also called the Caucus. The current parliamentary leader is Chris Hipkins (since 22 January 2023). A leadership election is triggered upon the vacancy of the position of leader or a motion of no confidence. Candidates are nominated from within the Caucus. Under Labour Party rules, party members have 40% of the votes, MPs have another 40% of the votes, and affiliated unions have 20% of the votes. Some observers have criticised the influence of the unions in leadership elections.

=== Affiliated trade unions ===
In the first decades of the 20th century, manufacturing industries grew strongly in New Zealand's main cities and union membership also increased. The Labour Party was formed in this period as the political wing of the labour movement and was financed by trade unions. Since then, the unions have retained close institutional links with the party. In 2023 there were 11 affiliated unions, which paid a levy to the party based on the size of their own memberships. Generally, members of these unions are also affiliated members of the Labour Party. Affiliates receive a percentage of the vote in party leadership elections.

In addition, the president of the New Zealand Council of Trade Unions continues to speak at the Labour Party Annual Conference.

=== Young Labour ===
Young Labour is the party's youth wing. It exists to organise young party members (and young members of affiliated unions) aged under 30, and encourage wider involvement of young New Zealanders in centre-left politics. Young Labour is the most active sector in the Labour Party and plays a significant role in policy development and campaign efforts. It is endearingly called the "conscience of the party".

In March 2018, it was reported that four people under 16 were allegedly sexually assaulted at a Young Labour summer camp in February. The camp was said to have "mountains of alcohol", and people under the legal drinking age of 18 were said to have consumed alcohol. Although Young Labour and the Labour Party were aware of the allegations, party leadership failed to tell the Prime Minister, Jacinda Ardern. The party offered counselling and support after the allegations were publicly reported. An independent review into the party's conduct and sexual assault complaint policy was announced by Party President Nigel Haworth, and was completed late August. The party has declined to release the report to the public.

=== Local government ===
Labour Party members, including current and former MPs, have contested various local government positions throughout New Zealand during local body elections. While several have stood as Labour Party candidates, others have contested the elections as independent politicians.

==== Auckland ====
Labour has contested the Auckland local body elections alongside City Vision, a left-leaning electoral ticket representing the local Labour, Green parties and other progressives. Following the 2022 Auckland local elections, the Auckland Council had four councillors serving under the Labour ticket and one serving under the affiliated City Vision ticket. In addition, 26 Labour Party candidates were elected to local community boards across Auckland while four Labour candidates were elected to local licensing trusts in the Auckland Region. Meanwhile, seven City Vision local board members and three City Vision liquor licensing trust members were also elected.

Former Labour MP and cabinet minister Phil Goff served as mayor of Auckland for two terms between 2016 and 2022.

During the 2025 Auckland Council election, five councillors were elected on the Labour ticket. In addition, 23 Labour local board members were elected in the Auckland region.

==== Christchurch ====
In Christchurch, former Labour MP and cabinet minister Lianne Dalziel served for three terms as mayor between 2013 and 2022. She ran as an independent

Within the Christchurch City Council, Labour maintains an umbrella, including community independents called The People's Choice (formerly Christchurch 2021). During the 2019 Christchurch local elections, People's Choice candidates held 10 community board seats, seven council seats, and several community board chairmanships.

During the 2022 Christchurch City Council election, five People's Choice candidates (including two joint Labour ones) and one Labour candidate was elected to the Christchurch City council. During the 2022 Environment Canterbury election, two People's Choice candidates (including one joint Labour one) were elected to Environment Canterbury.

During the 2025 Christchurch City Council election, six People's Choice candidates (including two joint Labour ones) and one Labour candidate were elected to the Christchurch City Council. During the 2025 Environment Canterbury election, three People's Choice candidates (including one joint Labour one) were elected to Environment Canterbury.

==== Dunedin ====
On 26 February 2016, Dunedin city councillor and former Labour MP David Benson-Pope announced that he would be contesting the Dunedin local elections in October under the "Local Labour" ticket. While still a Labour Party member, Benson Pope had stood in the 2013 local elections as an independent candidate. This report coincided with the dissolution of the city's main local body ticket, the centre-left Greater Dunedin group. On 20 April, it was reported that the Labour Party had dropped its plan to field a bloc of candidates in the 2016 Dunedin elections. However, the party has not ruled out endorsing other candidates.

During the 2019 local elections, Steve Walker and Marian Hobbs were elected to the Dunedin City Council (DCC) and Otago Regional Council respectively on Labour Party tickets. Hobbs subsequently resigned from the Otago Regional Council in November 2021.

During the 2022 Dunedin City Council election, Steve Walker and Joy Davis stood as Labour candidates for the DCC. While Walker was re-elected, Davis failed to win a seat.

During the 2025 Dunedin City Council election, Walker was re-elected as the Labour candidate on the DCC.

==== New Plymouth ====
In New Plymouth, former MP Harry Duynhoven served as mayor from 2010 to 2013, when he was defeated by Andrew Judd.

==== Palmerston North ====
Beginning in 2016, the Labour Party began contesting the Palmerston North local elections, ending a long tradition of keeping national party political affiliations out of local government bodies. During the 2016 local elections, Lorna Johnson was elected on the Labour Party ticket to the Palmerston North City Council. During the 2019 local elections, she was joined by Zulfiqar Butt, who also stood on the Labour ticket.

During the 2022 local elections, Johnson was re-elected to the Palmerston North City Council but Butt was defeated. During the 2025 Palmerston North City Council election, Johnson was re-elected to the Council but Butt was again defeated.

==== Rotorua ====
Former Rotorua electorate then Labour list MP Steve Chadwick, was elected as mayor of Rotorua in the 2013 elections. She stood as an independent. She served for three terms before resigning in 2022.

==== Wellington Region ====
During the 2022 Wellington City Council election, four Labour Party councillors were elected: Ben McNulty – Northern Ward, Rebecca Matthews – Onslow-Western Ward, Teri O'Neill – Eastern Ward, and Nureddin Abdurahman – Southern Ward. Labour MP Paul Eagle unsuccessfully contested the 2022 Wellington City mayoral election but came third place.

Daran Ponter of the Wellington City ward on the Greater Wellington Regional Council was the only councillor to have been re-elected on a Labour ticket during the 2022 Wellington local election.

Campbell Barry has been the mayor of Lower Hutt since 2019 and was re-elected on the Labour ticket along with Wainuiomata ward councilor Keri Brown during the 2022 Hutt City Council elections.

During the 2025 Wellington mayoral election, former Labour leader and MP Andrew Little was elected as Mayor of Wellington. Four councillors were also elected to the Wellington City Council on the Labour ticket. Two councillors were also elected to the Porirua City Council on the Labour ticket. One councillor was elected to the Hutt City Council on the Labour ticket. Two Labour councillors were also elected to the Greater Wellington Regional Council.

==== Whanganui ====
In Whanganui, Labour member Hamish McDouall served two terms as mayor until he was defeated by Andrew Tripe during the 2022 local elections. McDouall had previously contested the seat of Whanganui for the party. McDouall ran on an independent ticket.

== Electoral performance ==
=== House of Representatives ===
Election	Leader	Votes	%	Seats	+/–	Position	Status
1919	Harry Holland	131,402	24.25%	8 / 80	▲8	▲3rd	Opposition
1922	Harry Holland	150,448	23.70%	17 / 80	▲9	3rd	Opposition
1925	Harry Holland	184,650	27.20%	12 / 80	▼5	▲2nd	Opposition
1928	Harry Holland	198,092	26.19%	19 / 80	▲7	▼2nd	Coalition
1931	Harry Holland	244,881	34.27%	24 / 80	▲5	2nd	Opposition
1935	Michael Joseph Savage	434,368	46.17%	53 / 80	▲29	▲1st	Majority
1938	Michael Joseph Savage	528,290	55.82%	53 / 80	Steady	1st	Majority
1943	Peter Fraser	522,189	47.6%	45 / 80	▼8	1st	Majority
1946	Peter Fraser	536,994	51.28%	42 / 80	▼3	1st	Majority
1949	Peter Fraser	506,073	47.16%	34 / 80	▼8	▼2nd	Opposition
1951	Walter Nash	473,146	45.8%	30 / 80	▼4	2nd	Opposition
1954	Walter Nash	481,631	44.1%	35 / 80	▲5	2nd	Opposition
1957	Walter Nash	531,740	48.31%	41 / 80	▲6	▲1st	Majority
1960	Walter Nash	420,084	43.4%	34 / 80	▼7	▼2nd	Opposition
1963	Arnold Nordmeyer	383,205	43.7%	35 / 80	▲1	2nd	Opposition
1966	Norman Kirk	382,756	41.44%	35 / 80	Steady	2nd	Opposition
1969	Norman Kirk	464,346	44.2%	39 / 84	▲4	2nd	Opposition
1972	Norman Kirk	677,669	48.37%	55 / 87	▲16	▲1st	Majority
1975	Bill Rowling	634,453	39.56%	32 / 87	▼23	▼2nd	Opposition
1978	Bill Rowling	691,076	40.41%	40 / 92	▲8	2nd	Opposition
1981	Bill Rowling	702,630	39.01%	43 / 91	▲3	2nd	Opposition
1984	David Lange	829,154	42.98%	56 / 95	▲13	▲1st	Majority
1987	David Lange	878,448	47.96%	57 / 97	▲1	1st	Majority
1990	Mike Moore	640,915	35.14%	29 / 97	▼28	▼2nd	Opposition
1993	Mike Moore	666,759	34.68%	45 / 99	▲16	2nd	Opposition
1996	Helen Clark	584,159	28.19%	37 / 120	▼8	2nd	Opposition
1999	Helen Clark	800,199	38.74%	49 / 120	▲12	▲1st	Coalition
2002	Helen Clark	838,219	41.26%	52 / 120	▲3	1st	Coalition
2005	Helen Clark	935,319	41.10%	50 / 121	▼2	1st	Coalition
2008	Helen Clark	796,880	33.99%	43 / 122	▼7	▼2nd	Opposition
2011	Phil Goff	614,936	27.48%	34 / 121	▼9	2nd	Opposition
2014	David Cunliffe	604,534	25.13%	32 / 121	▼2	2nd	Opposition
2017	Jacinda Ardern	956,184	36.89%	46 / 120	▲14	2nd	Coalition
2020	Jacinda Ardern	1,443,546	50.01%	65 / 120	▲19	▲1st	Majority
2023	Chris Hipkins	767,236	26.91%	34 / 123	▼31	▼2nd	Opposition
2026	Chris Hipkins	TBD	TBD	36 / 131	▲2	2nd	TBD
Source: Electoral Commission

Labour did not contest every electorate until 1946, when it stood candidates in all 80 electorates. According to the National Executive reports, the number of official candidates in 1919 is uncertain (53 or possibly 46). The party ran 41 candidates in 1922; 56 in 1925; 55 in 1928; 53 in 1931; 70 in 1935; 78 in 1938; and 77 in 1943. Labour did not run against independent candidates who voted with Labour, such as Harry Atmore in Nelson and David McDougall in Mataura, Southland. Labour did not run candidates against the two Country Party candidates in 1935, but did in 1938, when both candidates were defeated.

==== Māori electorates ====
Election	Seats	+/–
1919	0 / 4	new
1922	0 / 4	0
1925	0 / 4	0
1928	0 / 4	0
1931	0 / 4	0
1935	0 / 4	0
1938	3 / 4	▲3
1943	4 / 4	▲1
1946	4 / 4	0
1949	4 / 4	0
1951	4 / 4	0
1954	4 / 4	0
1957	4 / 4	0
1960	4 / 4	0
1963	4 / 4	0
1966	4 / 4	0
1969	4 / 4	0
1972	4 / 4	0
1975	4 / 4	0
1978	4 / 4	0
1981	4 / 4	0
1984	4 / 4	0
1987	4 / 4	0
1990	4 / 4	0
1993	3 / 4	▼1
1996	0 / 5	▼3
1999	6 / 6	▲6
2002	7 / 7	▲1
2005	3 / 7	▼4
2008	2 / 7	▼1
2011	3 / 7	▲1
2014	6 / 7	▲3
2017	7 / 7	▲1
2020	6 / 7	▼1
2023	1 / 7	▼5

=== Local ===
Election	# of candidates					Winning candidates				
Election	Mayor	Council	Board	Regional council	Total	Mayor	Council	Board	Regional council	Total
2022	2	26	?	4		1 / 2	17 / 26	?	2 / 4	
2025	1	21	31	2	55	1 / 1	17 / 21	26 / 31	2 / 2	46 / 55 83.6%

== Leadership ==
The Labour Party has had 17 leaders, 11 of whom have served as prime minister. To date, Helen Clark served longest as leader of the Labour Party. While some dispute exists as to when Harry Holland officially became leader, Clark had passed his longest possible leadership term by 26 October 2008.

=== List of leaders ===
The following is a complete list of Labour Party leaders in the House of Representatives:
Key:
Labour Reform United National
PM: Prime Minister
LO: Leader of the Opposition
†: Died in office

No.	Leader	Portrait	Term Began	Term Ended	Position	Prime Minister
1	Alfred Hindmarsh		7 July 1916	13 November 1918†	—	Massey
2	Harry Holland		27 August 1919	8 October 1933†	—	Massey
2	Harry Holland		27 August 1919	8 October 1933†	—	Bell
2	Harry Holland		27 August 1919	8 October 1933†	LO 1926–1928	Coates
2	Harry Holland		27 August 1919	8 October 1933†	Junior coalition partner 1928–1931	Ward
2	Harry Holland		27 August 1919	8 October 1933†	LO 1931–1933	Forbes
3	Michael Joseph Savage		12 October 1933	27 March 1940†	LO 1933–1935	Forbes
3	Michael Joseph Savage		12 October 1933	27 March 1940†	PM 1935–1940	Savage
4	Peter Fraser		1 April 1940	12 December 1950†	PM 1940–1949	Fraser
4	Peter Fraser		1 April 1940	12 December 1950†	LO 1949–1950	Holland
5	Walter Nash		17 January 1951	31 March 1963	LO 1951–1957	Holland
5	Walter Nash		17 January 1951	31 March 1963	LO 1951–1957	Holyoake
5	Walter Nash		17 January 1951	31 March 1963	PM 1957–1960	Nash
5	Walter Nash		17 January 1951	31 March 1963	LO 1960–1963	Holyoake
6	Arnold Nordmeyer		1 April 1963	16 December 1965	LO 1963–1965	Holyoake
7	Norman Kirk		16 December 1965	31 August 1974†	LO 1965–1972	Holyoake
7	Norman Kirk		16 December 1965	31 August 1974†	LO 1965–1972	Marshall
7	Norman Kirk		16 December 1965	31 August 1974†	PM 1972–1974	Kirk
8	Bill Rowling		6 September 1974	3 February 1983	PM 1974–1975	Rowling
8	Bill Rowling		6 September 1974	3 February 1983	LO 1975–1983	Muldoon
9	David Lange		3 February 1983	8 August 1989	LO 1983–1984	Muldoon
9	David Lange		3 February 1983	8 August 1989	PM 1984–1989	Lange
10	Geoffrey Palmer		8 August 1989	4 September 1990	PM 1989–1990	Palmer
11	Mike Moore		4 September 1990	1 December 1993	PM 1990	Moore
11	Mike Moore		4 September 1990	1 December 1993	LO 1990–1993	Bolger
12	Helen Clark		1 December 1993	11 November 2008	LO 1993–1999	Bolger
12	Helen Clark		1 December 1993	11 November 2008	LO 1993–1999	Shipley
12	Helen Clark		1 December 1993	11 November 2008	PM 1999–2008	Clark
13	Phil Goff		11 November 2008	13 December 2011	LO 2008–2011	Key
14	David Shearer		13 December 2011	15 September 2013	LO 2011–2013	Key
15	David Cunliffe		15 September 2013	30 September 2014	LO 2013–2014	Key
16	Andrew Little		18 November 2014	1 August 2017	LO 2014–2017	Key
16	Andrew Little		18 November 2014	1 August 2017	LO 2014–2017	English
17	Jacinda Ardern		1 August 2017	22 January 2023	LO 2017	English
17	Jacinda Ardern		1 August 2017	22 January 2023	PM 2017–2023	Ardern
18	Chris Hipkins		22 January 2023	Incumbent	PM 2023	Hipkins
18	Chris Hipkins		22 January 2023	Incumbent	LO 2023–present	Luxon

=== List of deputy leaders ===
The following is a complete list of Labour Party deputy leaders:

No.	Deputy leader	Term
1	James McCombs	1919–1923
2	Michael Joseph Savage	1923–1933
3	Peter Fraser	1933–1940
4	Walter Nash	1940–1950
5	Jerry Skinner	1951–1962
6	Fred Hackett	1962–1963
7	Hugh Watt	1963–1974
8	Bob Tizard	1974–1979
9	David Lange	1979–1983
10	Geoffrey Palmer	1983–1989
11	Helen Clark	1989–1993
12	David Caygill	1993–1996
13	Michael Cullen	1996–2008
14	Annette King	2008–2011
15	Grant Robertson	2011–2013
16	David Parker	2013–2014
14	Annette King	2014–2017
17	Jacinda Ardern	2017
18	Kelvin Davis	2017–2023
19	Carmel Sepuloni	2023–present

== List of presidents ==
The following is a complete list of Labour Party presidents:

No.	President	Term
1	James McCombs	1916–1917
2	Andrew Walker	1917–1918
3	Tom Paul	1918–1920
4	Peter Fraser	1920–1921
5	Frederick Cooke	1921–1922
6	Tom Brindle	1922–1926
7	Bob Semple	1926–1928
8	John Archer	1928–1929
9	Jim Thorn	1929–1931
10	Rex Mason	1931–1932
11	Bill Jordan	1932–1933
12	Frank Langstone	1933–1934
13	Tim Armstrong	1934–1935
14	Walter Nash	1935–1936
15	Clyde Carr	1936–1937
16	James Roberts	1937–1950
17	Arnold Nordmeyer	1950–1955
18	Michael Moohan	1955–1960
19	Martyn Finlay	1960–1964
20	Norman Kirk	1964–1966
21	Norman Douglas	1966–1970
22	Bill Rowling	1970–1973
23	Charles Bennett	1973–1976
24	Arthur Faulkner	1976–1978
25	Jim Anderton	1979–1984
26	Margaret Wilson	1984–1987
27	Rex Jones	1987–1988
28	Ruth Dyson	1988–1993
29	Maryan Street	1993–1995
30	Michael Hirschfeld	1995–1999
31	Bob Harvey	1999–2000
32	Mike Williams	2000–2009
33	Andrew Little	2009–2011
34	Moira Coatsworth	2011–2015
35	Nigel Haworth	2015–2019
36	Claire Szabó	2019–2022
37	Jill Day	2022–present

== See also ==
- City Vision, a prominent Auckland Council political ticket composed of Labour and Green Party members
- List of Labour parties
- List of New Zealand Labour Party MPs
- Politics of New Zealand
- Rainbow Labour
