= Bob Harvey (mayor) =

New Zealand politician (born 1940)

Sir Bob Harvey KNZM QSO
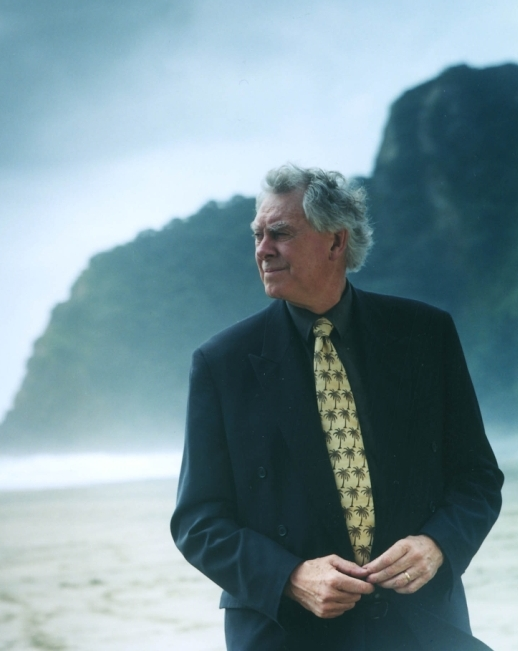

2nd Mayor of Waitakere City
- In office 1992–2010
- Preceded by: Assid Corban
- Succeeded by: Len Brown (as Mayor of Auckland Council)

31st President of the Labour Party
- In office 16 February 1999 – 19 November 2000
- Vice President: Terry Scott
- Leader: Helen Clark
- Preceded by: Michael Hirschfeld
- Succeeded by: Mike Williams

Personal details
- Born: 24 November 1940 (age 85)
- Party: Labour
- Spouse: Barbara Harvey
- Children: 5

Sir Robert Anster Harvey KNZM QSO (born 24 November 1940) is a New Zealand former advertising executive and politician. He is best known for his time as mayor of Waitakere City, which he held for 18 years from 1992 to 2010, and was also president of the New Zealand Labour Party in 1999 and 2000.

== Early life and family ==
Harvey was adopted when he was six months old, although he did not learn this until he was 50. He married Barbara, a midwife, in 1970. The couple has five adult children.

A keen swimmer and surf life-saver, Harvey won the bronze medal at the New Zealand national championships in 1972 and the 1995 life saving world championships. He swam the Dardanelles in 1979 and was the first to attempt the notorious mouth of the Manukau Harbour, the Manukau Heads in 1987.

Harvey was associated with the establishment of the Westpac Rescue Helicopter service, which was a world pioneer in civilian helicopter rescue services. He has been a member of the Karekare Beach Surf Lifesaving Patrol and is also a life member of the New Zealand Lifesaving Association and the Auckland Lifesaving Association (Northern).

Harvey was an instigator of the great walking trail of New Zealand, Te Araroa, in 1994 with journalist and keen walker Geoff Chapple. He served as chair and deputy chair of the Te Araroa Trust. Harvey was also chair of the Park and Wilderness Trust (ARC 1986) to save Auckland's endangered Hamlin's Hill from motorway encroachment and other environmental at risks areas.

== Career ==
Harvey's first career was in advertising. He was a founder of one of New Zealand's larger advertising agencies, MacHarman Ayer (formerly MacHarman Advertising), for whom he worked from 1962 to 1992. During this time he was heavily involved in election campaigns for the New Zealand Labour Party between 1969 and 1984. He is credited by many for the physical and political transformation of former New Zealand prime ministers Norman Kirk and David Lange. He also worked as election strategist to Auckland mayors Sir Dove-Myer Robinson, Dame Catherine Tizard, and Colin Kay.

Harvey was also involved in the environmental campaign objecting to the building of a hydro-electric power station at Lake Manapouri in 1968 to 1972, the Save Manapouri Campaign. He also produced The Adventure World of Sir Edmund Hillary, Keep on the Sunny Side, Seasons in Nasby with Warwick Brock and Start Again with Roger Donaldson for television. His agency won many international awards for creativity including the first Cannes television award for a New Zealand television commercial (directed by Roger Donaldson). His advertising career spanned some of the most creative years in New Zealand advertising and Harvey attracted and worked with some leading edge talent including Dick Frizzell, John Hanlon, Warwick Brock, Grant Marshall, and Rodney Charters (DOP for the TV series 24). Harvey was an inaugural inductee of the New Zealand Advertising Hall of Fame in 2007.

Prior to becoming mayor, Harvey served as deputy chairman of the New Zealand Film Commission from 1986 to 1992. He returned to the Film Commission as a board member from 2001 to 2006. From 1988 to 1990 he was chairman of the 1990 Commonwealth Games Arts Festival.

Harvey was chair of the board of directors for Waterfront Auckland, chairman of the Health Sponsorship Council in 1993–94, and was a board member of the Tourist Hotel Corporation from 1995 to 1998. He was a member of the Te Papa board from 2006 until 2009. He is a member of the USA Eisenhower Fellowship Nomination Committee and President of the New Zealand Peace Foundation.

A life member of the New Zealand Labour Party, Harvey served as president from 1999 to 2000, stepping in after the death of Michael Hirschfeld. While he was president, Labour apologised to a West Auckland family after Harvey lowered his shorts and yelled an obscenity during an argument in public with a long-time adversary in 1999.

== Mayor of Waitakere City ==
Harvey was elected Mayor of Waitakere City in October 1992. He served six consecutive terms with Waitakere City Council until 2010 when reforms led to seven territorial authority councils, including Waitakere City Council, being replaced by the new Auckland Council.

He was elected on an environmental platform to manage growth in the Waitākere Ranges and to make Waitakere City the first eco-city in New Zealand. In 1998 Harvey was awarded Prix Unesco Villes pour la piax in Stockholm for services to peace. Harvey introduced the First Call for Children as the other main platform for the city's vision. Waitakere has gained international recognition and acclaim for its environmental stance and initiatives. Under Harvey's leadership the city built four major libraries, the Waitakere Trusts Stadium and the environmentally friendly headquarters of the city, Waitakere Central, acclaimed for its sustainability features such as the green roof and recycling systems. Waitakere's Project Twin Streams was awarded the LivCom international award for environmental strategy in 2006. The city also won a LivCom award for being the most "livable" city in the world. LivCom is a United Nations backed initiative. Harvey won the personal lifetime achievement LivCom award in 2008. In 2009 Harvey was invited by the global organisation, Mayors for Peace, to be a member of its executive committee.

Harvey in 1997 led a local government delegation to Tahiti against French nuclear testing in the Pacific. In 1998 he joined the working party of the Mayor's Ascia Pacific Environment Summit and the following year was an executive member of that summit. Havey was a keynote speaker at Pathways to Growth at the invitation of British Prime Minister John Major in Manchester in 1993, at ICLEI (Local Governments for Sustainability) HABITAT 11 conference in Istanbal in 1995, at the Silicon Valley Environmental Conference in 2000 and at the American Water Works Association Conference in Hawaii in 2001. In 2002 Harvey was the Local Government representative at the United Nations World Summit on Sustainable Development (Rio+10) in Johannesburg. In 2007 he became a member of the Australasian Mayors for Climate Change and in 2008 was the keynote speaker at the Eco City Summit in Washington.

After the creation of Auckland Council in 2010, Harvey was appointed as chair of Waterfront Auckland. He held that role until 2015, when he became "Champion for Auckland – overseas investment" to promote Auckland internationally and facilitate international investment opportunities.

== Publications ==
Harvey is a published author and historian, with several books to his name, starting with Hey Dad in 1983. Others include Rolling Thunder the history of Karekare which won the Montana Books Award's environmental category, Untamed Coast which was a Montana Book Award finalist (3 editions), Wild Beast about painter Dean Buchanan, White Cloud Silver Screen a collection of film scene locations, Spirit of the West with Ted Scott, Iron Bound Coast the memoir of Wally Badham, Westies and (2014) Wild Westie – the incredible life of Bob Harvey, a biography by Hazel Phillips and published by Penguin. Bob is currently working on the history of the Kakekare Surf Lifesaving Club, of which he is a life member, for its 80th birthday celebration called The Boys of Summer. He is also a regular contributor to Metro magazine.

== Awards and honours ==
Harvey received the New Zealand 1990 Commemoration Medal in 1990. In the 1991 New Year Honours, he was appointed a Companion of the Queen's Service Order for public services. He was awarded the United Nations Mayors for Peace Award in 1998 and honorary citizenship of Waitakere Sister City Ningbo, People's Republic of China in 2005.

After retiring from local government in 2010, he was knighted as a Knight Companion of the New Zealand Order of Merit in the 2013 New Year Honours.

== Bibliography ==
- Hey Dad! (1983), St John Publishing
- Untamed Coast: Auckland's Waitakere Ranges and West Coast Beaches (1998) (Montana Book Awards finalist 2000, Exisle Publishing
- Rolling Thunder: the Spirit of Karekare (2001) (2002 Montana Book Awards Environment Category winner), Exisle Publishing
- Westies: Up Front, Out There (2004), Exisle Publishing.
- Wild Beast: the Art of Dean Buchanan (2007), Exisle Publishing
- The Iron Bound Coast: Karekare in the Early Years (2009), Oratia Media. Wallace Badham (author); Bob Harvey (editor)
- Spirit of the West: West of Auckland Through the Lens (2009), Heritage Publishing. Ted Scott (photographs); Bob Harvey (text)

Party political offices
| Preceded by Michael Hirschfeld | President of the Labour Party; 1999–2000 | Succeeded by Mike Williams |
