= Andrew Little (New Zealand politician) =

New Zealand politician (born 1965)

His Worship the Honourable Andrew Little
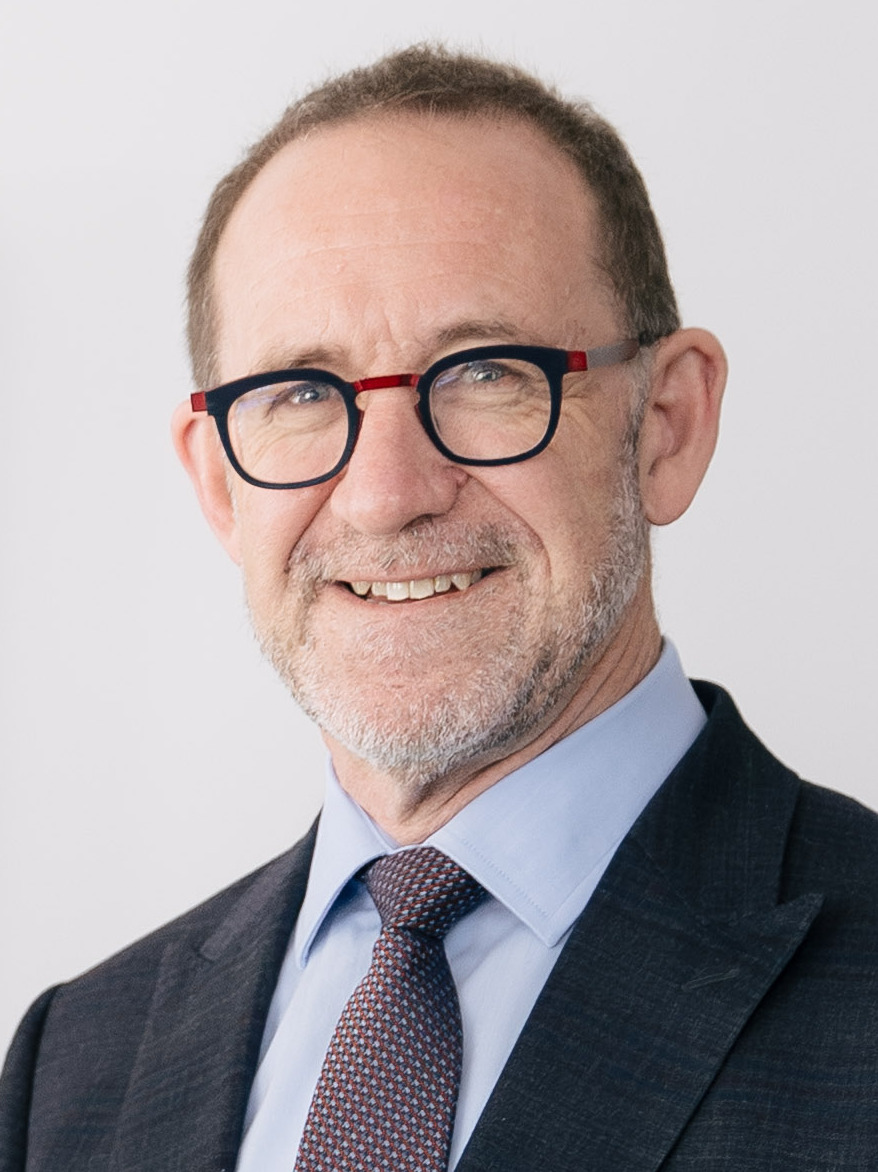
- Little in 2025

38th Mayor of Wellington
- Incumbent
- Assumed office 17 October 2025
- Deputy: Ben McNulty
- Preceded by: Tory Whanau
- Majority: 34,522

35th Leader of the Opposition and 16th Leader of the Labour Party
- In office 18 November 2014 – 1 August 2017
- Prime Minister: John Key; Bill English
- Deputy: Annette King; Jacinda Ardern
- Preceded by: David Cunliffe (Note: David Parker acted from 30 September to 18 November 2014.)
- Succeeded by: Jacinda Ardern

6th Minister for Treaty of Waitangi Negotiations
- In office 26 October 2017 – 27 November 2023
- Prime Minister: Jacinda Ardern; Chris Hipkins
- Preceded by: Chris Finlayson
- Succeeded by: Paul Goldsmith

42nd Minister of Health
- In office 6 November 2020 – 1 February 2023
- Prime Minister: Jacinda Ardern; Chris Hipkins
- Preceded by: Chris Hipkins
- Succeeded by: Ayesha Verrall

49th Minister of Justice
- In office 26 October 2017 – 6 November 2020
- Prime Minister: Jacinda Ardern
- Preceded by: Amy Adams
- Succeeded by: Kris Faafoi

33rd President of the Labour Party
- In office 2 March 2009 – 2 April 2011
- Vice President: Moira Coatsworth
- Preceded by: Mike Williams
- Succeeded by: Moira Coatsworth

Member of the New Zealand Parliament for the Labour Party List
- In office 26 November 2011 – 5 December 2023

Personal details
- Born: Andrew James Little; 7 May 1965 (age 61) New Plymouth, New Zealand
- Spouse: Leigh Fitzgerald (m. 2008)
- Children: 1
- Education: Victoria University of Wellington
- Website: www.andrewlittle.nz

Andrew James Little (born 7 May 1965) is a New Zealand politician serving as mayor of Wellington, the capital city of New Zealand, since 17 October 2025. A lawyer and former trade union official, Little was Leader of the Labour Party and Leader of the Opposition from 2014 to 2017 and a senior minister in the Labour governments led by Jacinda Ardern and Chris Hipkins from 2017 to 2023.

Little was first elected as a Labour Party list MP in 2011, after serving as President of the Labour Party between 2009 and 2011. His political career followed a career in unionism, which included 11 years as the national secretary of the Engineering, Printing and Manufacturing Union, New Zealand's largest private-sector union.

Little's term as Labour leader was characterised by low opinion polling results and punctuated by his resignation from the role less than two months before he was due to lead the party in the 2017 general election. Little's decision was described as "selfless" and instrumental in Labour's success under new leader Jacinda Ardern. In the following six years he served as a senior minister and was regarded as a "safe pair of hands" across 12 ministerial portfolios, including Minister for Treaty of Waitangi Negotiations, Minister of Justice, Minister of Health and Minister of Defence.

Following the Labour Government's defeat in the 2023 election, Little declined to return to Parliament as a list MP and returned to legal practice. He resumed his political career in 2025, winning the 2025 Wellington mayoral election.

== Early life ==
Born in New Plymouth on 7 May 1965, Little was educated at New Plymouth Boys' High School. His father was a devout National Party supporter and Little recalls delivering National pamphlets under his father's direction when he was younger. When he was 17, Little got his first job as a labourer digging the main cable trench for a new methanol plant in Waitara Valley as part of the "Think Big" programme. During his time there he noticed that the contractor he was working for was deliberately using a less than adequate amount of concrete than the work required. He finished work there at the beginning of 1984 and left upon being accepted to enter university. He had also worked as a timber yard worker and in security.

In the 1980s Little studied law, philosophy and public policy at Victoria University of Wellington, where he became active in the campaign against New Zealand's student loan scheme. He was president of the Victoria University of Wellington Students' Association for the 1987 academic year and served as New Zealand Union of Students' Associations (NZUSA) president in 1988 and 1989.

== Career with trade unions ==
After graduating Little took a job as a lawyer with the Engineers' Union (a forerunner of the EPMU), with his work including Accident Compensation Corporation (ACC) and employment law issues. In 1997 he was appointed the union's general counsel. Two years later, he was appointed assistant national secretary, and was elected national secretary when Rex Jones stood down from the position in 2000.

In 2007 Little was ranked at number 40 on the New Zealand Listener Power List.

Little became an important extra-parliamentary figure within the Labour Party and was one of the main advisors from the trade unions. Little was a representative on Labour's national council as Affiliates vice-president, responsible for liaising between the Labour Party and affiliated trade unions. On 2 March 2009 it was announced that Little was elected unopposed as President of the New Zealand Labour Party. He held that post until 2 April 2011.

== In Opposition, 2011–2017 ==
New Zealand Parliament
Years	Term	Electorate	List	Party
2011–2014	50th	List	15	Labour
2014–2017	51st	List	11	Labour
2017–2020	52nd	List	3	Labour
2020–2023	53rd	List	7	Labour

=== First term (2011–2014) ===
Little stood for Parliament in the 2011 general election. Despite a loss in the New Plymouth electorate to the National Party incumbent Jonathan Young, he was elected as a list MP owing to his ranking of 15 on the Labour Party list. This was the highest rank given to a Labour candidate who was not an incumbent MP. Political commentators quickly identified him as a potential future Labour Party leader and prime minister.

In his first term, he held the ACC shadow portfolio and gained profile during the National-led government's restructuring of the organisation. Together with Trevor Mallard, he launched attacks against ACC Minister Judith Collins, who eventually responded with issuing a defamation claim in May 2012. The affair resulted in the resignations of the Accident Compensation Corporation (ACC) chairman John Judge, and the ACC chief executive Ralph Stewart. In December 2012, Collins settled her defamation case against Little and Mallard following a hearing at the Auckland High Court. In early 2013, Little was reassigned to the justice, tourism and labour portfolios.

In December 2013, Little drafted a member's bill that, if passed, would create a new criminal offence of corporate manslaughter. The Crimes (Corporate Manslaughter) Amendment Bill was drafted in the wake of the 2010 Pike River Mine disaster and the CTV Building collapse during the 2011 Christchurch earthquake. The bill was modelled on the United Kingdom's Corporate Manslaughter and Corporate Homicide Act 2007. At the time, Little stated the bill was needed because "the track record of prosecutions under the Health and Safety Act is that they tend to focus on lower level failures because getting the evidence and securing the conviction are easier, but personal responsibility for fatalities goes unchecked." A 2012 3News poll found that seventy-four percent of respondents would like to see a charge of corporate manslaughter introduced. The Bill was eventually transferred to the name of David Cunliffe but was not drawn before Cunliffe's retirement from Parliament in early 2017.

=== Second term and leadership (2014–2017) ===
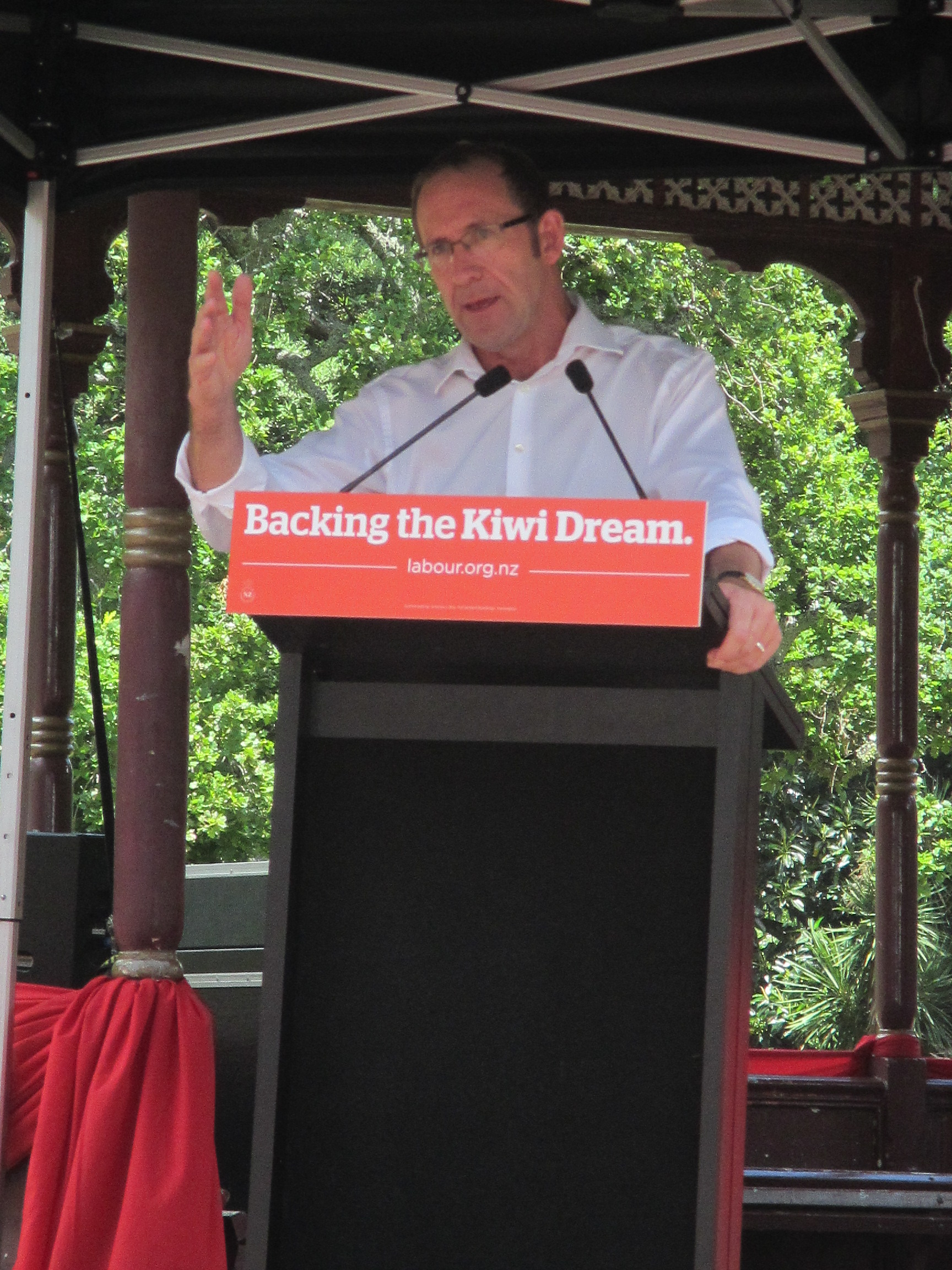
Little's 'State of the Nation' speech, January 2016

At the 2014 election he again stood and lost in the New Plymouth electorate. Young was returned with a much increased margin, but this was partially explained by boundary changes. Little was elected as list MP because of his ranking of 11 on the Labour Party list.

Following Labour's defeat at the general election in September 2014, David Cunliffe resigned as leader of the Labour Party. Little announced his bid for the 2014 Labour Party leadership election on 9 October 2014 and was nominated by Poto Williams and Iain Lees-Galloway. He won the leadership election on 18 November 2014, defeating Grant Robertson, David Parker, and Nanaia Mahuta. In reporting on the election, some media focused on his trade union background. The election used an electoral college system where unions affiliated to the Labour Party had 20 percent of the vote; while Robertson had led Little in the caucus and party membership sections, the unions' support contributed to Little's narrow victory.

As Leader of the Labour Party and Leader of the Opposition, Little sought to challenge the Government with a strong alternative narrative. In a 2015 conference speech he introduced a new "Kiwi dream" theme (the New Zealand dream). In 2015 Labour introduced a new slogan, "Backing the Kiwi Dream". Little largely focused on issues and concerns such as rising house prices in urban areas, a 'brain drain', unemployment and job security and the growing wage gap between baby boomers and millennials. The "Kiwi dream" narrative was particularly designed to engage young voters.

Little appointed long-serving Labour MP Annette King as Labour's 'interim' deputy leader shortly after his election as leader. This appointment was made permanent in October 2015 after Jacinda Ardern (who had previously sought to be Robertson's deputy leader) was reportedly offered the role but turned it down. Robertson was appointed finance spokesperson and ranked third in the caucus in a bid to unify different groups within the party. For much of Little's leadership, key portfolios in the Little shadow Cabinet were held by King (health), Phil Twyford (housing), Chris Hipkins (education), Ardern (justice and children) and Carmel Sepuloni (social development). Little reshuffled his shadow cabinet in November 2015 (demoting David Cunliffe), December 2016 (after the retirements of Phil Goff and David Shearer) and March 2017 (in which Ardern was promoted to deputy leader).

Little was criticised by some for perceived poor performance in television interviews, his low profile and poor name recognition with the general public. A Dominion Post assessment said "he has little charisma and a lack of new ideas" and criticised Labour's "bare platform." He was praised by political commentators early in his leadership for uniting the party caucus and averting the infighting that characterised David Cunliffe's tenure as leader, though at the expense of dropping many of the party's former policy proposals.

In October 2016 Labour floated the idea of a levy on employers who imported offshore skilled labour rather than upskilling their domestic workers. Little responded to criticisms that it amounted to a "tax on immigrants", saying "If we want to make sure we've got the skills for the future ... for those employers who don't take on apprentices, don't invest in training, you can contribute a levy and that'll help to defray the cost of those who are doing the training." Little also criticised the number of travel visas granted to semi-skilled workers, citing statistics. Kirk Hope, chief executive of Business New Zealand, criticised the proposal policy and warned that it would affect smaller businesses who are unable to recruit enough local workers.

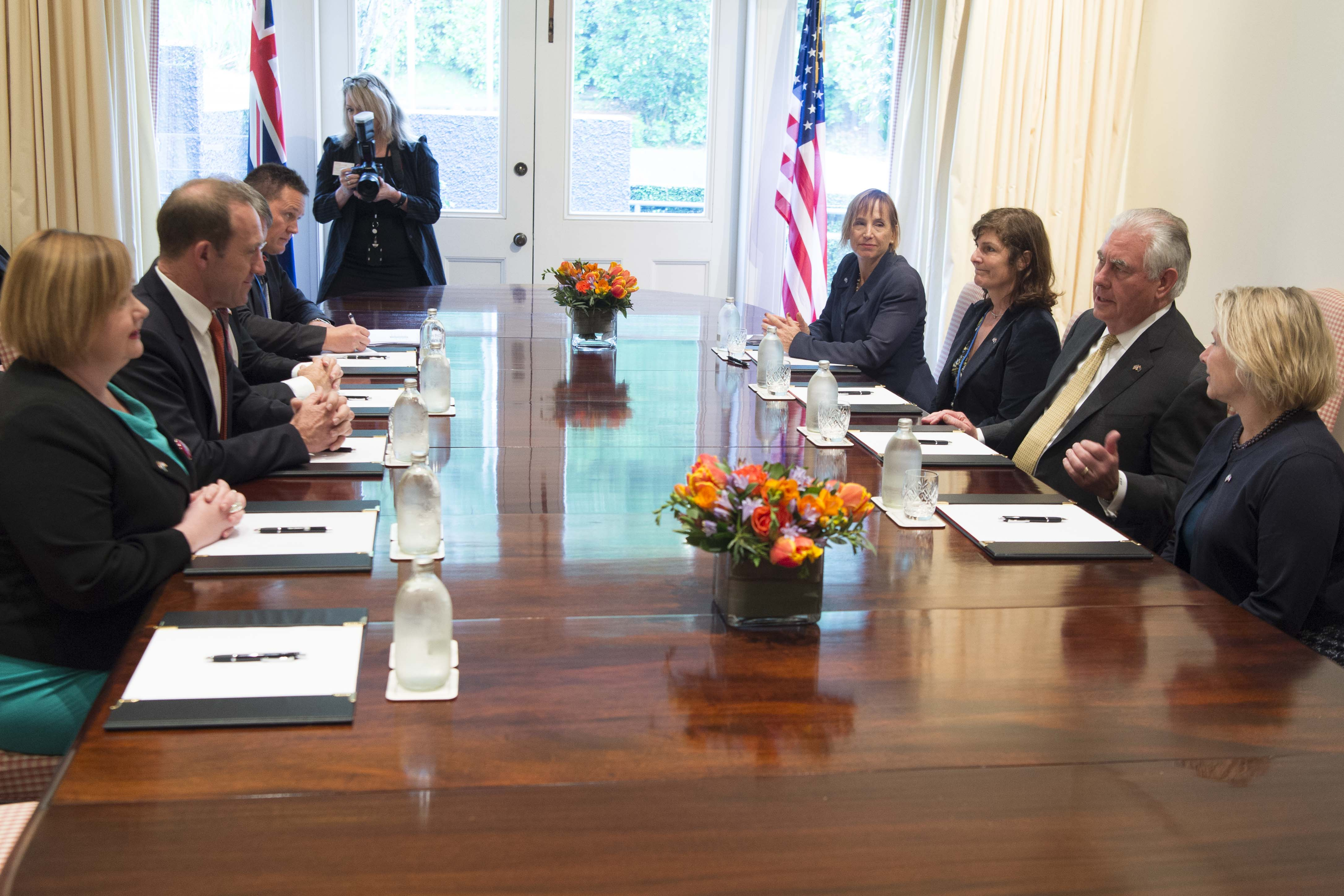
Little (as Labour leader) meeting with US Secretary of State Rex Tillerson in June 2017

Little was sued for defamation by Lani and Earl Hagaman after he made statements linking a contract awarded to their company with donations they had made to the National Party. In April 2017, a jury cleared him of some of the charges and was unable to reach a verdict on others.

On 1 August 2017, Little resigned as Leader of the Labour Party due to ongoing low performance in political opinion polls. He was succeeded by his deputy, Jacinda Ardern, who led the party to a surprise victory in the general election that September. Little was later lauded by party supporters for "selflessly" putting aside his personal ambition to allow Ardern to lead the party into a new government with New Zealand First and the Green Party. Little served as Labour's justice spokesperson over the election period.

== In Government, 2017–2023 ==
Little was a senior minister in the Sixth Labour Government led by Jacinda Ardern and Chris Hipkins between 2017 and 2023. He held twelve portfolios during the government's term.

Portfolio	Start	End
Minister for Courts	26 October 2017	6 November 2020
Minister of Justice	26 October 2017	6 November 2020
Minister for Pike River Re-entry	26 October 2017	1 February 2023
Minister responsible for the Government Communications Security Bureau	26 October 2017	27 November 2023
Minister responsible for the New Zealand Security Intelligence Service	26 October 2017	27 November 2023
Minister for Treaty of Waitangi Negotiations	26 October 2017	27 November 2023
Minister for Workplace Relations and Safety	22 July 2020	6 November 2020
Minister of Health	6 November 2020	1 February 2023
Lead Coordination Minister for the Government's Response to the Royal Commission's Report into the Terrorist Attack on the Christchurch Mosques	10 December 2020	27 November 2023
Minister of Defence	1 February 2023	27 November 2023
Minister for the Public Service	1 February 2023	27 November 2023
Minister of Immigration	21 June 2023	27 November 2023

=== Third term (2017–2020) ===
The Labour Party increased its share of the vote in the 2017 election. Little was elected as a Cabinet Minister by the Labour Party caucus following Labour's formation of a government with New Zealand First and the Greens. In late October 2017, Little assumed several portfolios including Minister of Justice, Minister for Courts, Minister Responsible for the Government Communications Security Bureau (GCSB) and the New Zealand Security Intelligence Service (NZSIS), Minister for Treaty of Waitangi Negotiations, and Minister Responsible for Pike River Re-entry.

Following the success of the pilot Alcohol and Other Drug Treatment Court (the AODTC) at reducing reoffending, in December 2017, Little announced that alcohol and drug courts would be rolled out nationwide. Two years later, he said the AODTC had proved effective, reducing reoffending by 23% up to two years after treatment. Following a negative evaluation by the Ministry of Justice, in March 2020, Little published a media release which claimed the AODTC was expensive to operate and needed modifications to "sustain reoffending gains over the long term". One more drug court has been established in Hamilton, but they have not been rolled out anywhere else.

On 20 November 2018, Little announced the creation of the Pike River Recovery Agency to plan a re-entry of the Pike River Mine in order to recover the bodies of the 29 miners who perished during the Pike River Mine disaster in September 2010. On 19 April 2018, Little entered the Pike River mine portal with victims' family representatives Anna Osborne and Sonya Rockhouse to demonstrate that a safe re-entry was possible. He also promised that the Government would re-enter the drift to recover evidence and the remains of deceased miners. Drift entry was achieved in 2019 but plans to recover the victims' bodies were abandoned in 2021.

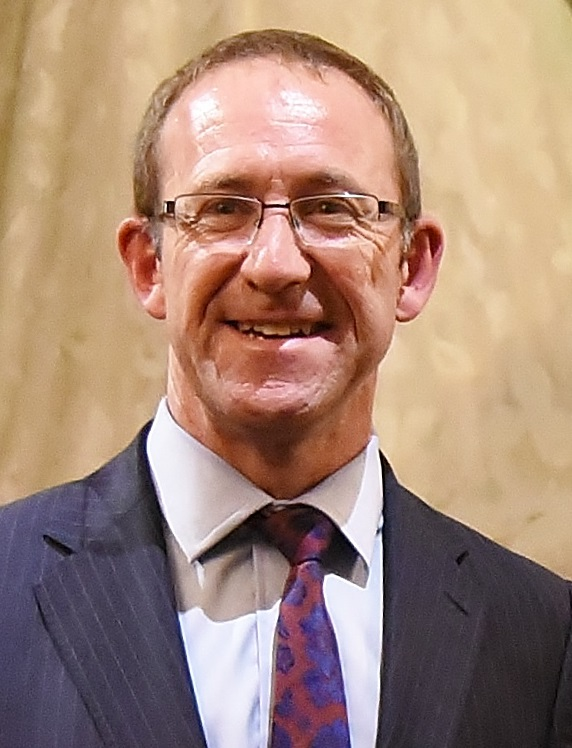
Little in December 2017

As Justice Minister, Little announced plans in December 2017 to reduce the prison population by 30 per cent over the next 15 years. The prison population at the time was 10,394. Towards this goal, in May 2018, he announced the Government would repeal the contentious 'three strikes' law (the Sentencing and Parole Reform Act 2010) which had been introduced by the previous National Government. NZ First refused to back this proposal forcing Little to announce on 11 June 2018 that the coalition Government had abandoned the plan.

Little later voiced criticism of Australia's deportation of New Zealanders in Australia during a controversial Australian Broadcasting Corporation documentary entitled "Don't Call Australia Home", that was released on 17 July 2018. Under changes to the Australian Migration Act, any foreigners with a criminal record or who do not meet a "character test" are subject to deportation. Little remarked that Australia's deportation policy would damage the sibling relationship between the two countries. Little's remarks drew criticism from the Australian Assistant Minister for Home Affairs Alex Hawke, who defended the deportations on law and order grounds and criticised Little for not urging New Zealand citizens to obey Australian law. In response, Little criticised Australia's deportation laws for lacking "humanitarian ideals" and described the removal of New Zealand citizens who identified as Australian residents as a human rights violation. In response, the Australian Minister for Home Affairs Peter Dutton defended his government's deportation policy and called on Little to reflect "a little more" on the Trans-Tasman relationship. Little countered by expressing concern about what he perceived as a growing "venality" in Australia's treatment of foreigners.

On 24 July 2018, Little rejected a call by the United Nations committee on women's rights for a Royal Commission of Inquiry into New Zealand's Family Court system, saying the New Zealand Government already has a fair idea of what the problems were. Little had already ordered a Ministerial Review of the Family Court.

After the Christchurch mosque shootings in March 2019, Little told Radio New Zealand, “I have given authority to the agencies to do intrusive activities under warrant, the number of those (warrants) I'm not at liberty to disclose". He said that the intelligence services usually put 30 to 40 people under monitoring at a time. Although more people than usual were being monitored, he was not willing to reveal how many. He also stated that the operations could be anything from physical surveillance to watching telecommunications activity.

On 5 August 2019, as Justice Minister, Little announced abortion law reform legislation that would permit abortion without restrictions for the first 20 weeks of a woman's pregnancy. While later-term abortions will still require testing by medical experts, Little announced that abortion would also be removed from the Crimes Act 1961. Other changes include allowing women to self-refer to an abortion service, ensuring that health practitioners advise women about counselling services, establishing safe areas around abortion facilities, and ensuring that conscientious objecting doctors inform women about their stance and alternative services. Labour had negotiated with New Zealand First cabinet minister Tracey Martin for several months to ensure support for the legislation. Though Martin ruled out a referendum, she was overruled by NZ First party leader Winston Peters, who demanded a binding referendum. Little rejected Peters' call for a referendum, stating that the Government would seek the support of MPs from all parties to pass the legislation. On 18 March 2020, he voted for the bill at its third reading, and it became law as the Abortion Legislation Act 2020.

On 22 July 2020, Little was appointed Minister for Workplace Relations and Safety following the resignation of Iain Lees-Galloway due to an affair with one of his staff members.

=== Fourth term (2020–2023) ===
During the 2020 New Zealand general election held on 17 October 2020, Little was re-elected on the Labour Party list. In early November, Little was named as Minister of Health and also retained his ministerial portfolios for the Government Communications Security Bureau, the New Zealand Security Intelligence Service, Treaty of Waitangi Negotiations, and Pike River Re-entry. He was additionally appointed Lead Coordination Minister for the Government's Response to the Royal Commission's Report into the Terrorist Attack on the Christchurch Mosques after that report was published in December 2020.

On 20 July 2021, Little, in his capacity as Minister in charge of the Government Communications Security Bureau, confirmed that the spy agency had established links between Chinese state-sponsored actors known as "Advanced Persistent Threat 40" (APT40) and malicious cyber activity in New Zealand. In addition, Little confirmed that New Zealand was joining other Western governments including the United States, United Kingdom, Australia and the European Union in condemning the Chinese Ministry of State Security and other Chinese state-sponsored actors for their involvement in the 2021 Microsoft Exchange Server data breach. In response, the Chinese Embassy in New Zealand rejected the New Zealand Government's claims, claiming that China was a staunch defender of cybersecurity and firmly opposed all forms of cyber attacks and crimes.

In mid-June 2022, Little in his capacity as Health Minister acknowledged that the country's health system was under strain due to a manpower shortage and the effects of COVID-19 and the seasonal flu on hospitals and health clinics. However, he denied that health services were facing a crisis. In response, the National Party's health spokesperson Shane Reti accused Little of denying that New Zealand's healthcare system was facing a crisis. Little's remarks were criticised by various unidentified health workers, who reported that significant staff shortages and hospital demand in response to COVID-19 and the seasonal flu were straining hospital resources. In early July 2022, the Association of General Surgeons issued an open letter to Little stating that the staffing shortage was undermining the ability of doctors to deliver care to patients.

In late October 2022, Little in his capacity as Minister of Treaty of Waitangi negotiations apologised to the Taranaki–based Māori iwi (tribe) Ngāti Maru on behalf of the New Zealand Crown for land confiscations that occurred following the New Zealand Wars. Though the tribe had not taken part in the fighting, most of their land had been confiscated by the Crown.

During a cabinet shuffle that occurred on 31 January 2023, Little was succeeded as Health Minister by Ayesha Verrall. Little also replaced Peeni Henare as Minister of Defence. Prime Minister Chris Hipkins, who succeeded Jacinda Ardern earlier in the month, stated that Little had supported "any decision made about the portfolio" and added that he had full confidence in Little. Little also retained his ministerial portfolios for the GCSB, NZSIS, Public Service, Treaty of Waitangi negotiations and Lead Coordination Minister for the Government's Response to the Royal Commission's Report into the Terrorist Attack on the Christchurch Mosques.

On 21 June 2023, following the resignation of Michael Wood from cabinet, Little gained the Immigration portfolio.

== Post-parliamentary career ==
=== Retiring from Parliament ===
Little contested the 2023 election as a list-only candidate. Following Labour's loss in the 2023 election, Little chose to retire from politics altogether, officially resigning his seat on 5 December 2023. Little said his "one regret" was not completing reforms to New Zealand's national security sector proposed after the 2019 Christchurch mosque attacks.

On the same day as his official resignation, Little was granted retention of the title The Honourable in recognition of his term as a member of the Executive Council. In March 2024, he was announced as an employment and treaty law consultant for Wellington-based law firm Gibson Sheat.

Since leaving Parliament, Little has continued to comment publicly on political issues, criticising the newly elected coalition government's Treaty of Waitangi policies in an op-ed for Newsroom and expressing support for the AUKUS security pact. Little's support for AUKUS differs from the Labour Party, which has since 2024 expressed opposition to New Zealand's involvement in the security pact.

=== 2025 Wellington mayoral election ===
On 16 April 2025, Andrew Little formally announced that he is running for mayor of Wellington in the 2025 Wellington City mayoral election, after The Post reported earlier that month that he was considering running for mayor. On 28 April, Little secured the Wellington Labour Local Body Committee's backing to contest the 2025 mayoral election as Labour's candidate. On 29 April, the incumbent mayor Tory Whanau pulled out of the mayoral race and endorsed Little.

In mid-May 2025, Little expressed disagreement with the Wellington City Council's Golden Mile mayoral pedestrianisation project, opining that the Council should not sign new contracts until after the Wellington mayoral election scheduled for 11 October. In response, Mayor Whanau said that delaying the project would increase costs and affect rates. While campaigning, Little identified saving the historically significant Begonia House and Khandallah Pool, and completing the Karori Event Centre as his key mayoral priorities.

Little was successful, winning the mayoralty by a large margin.

== Wellington mayoralty (2025–present) ==
In late October 2025, Little appointed Labour councillor Ben McNulty as deputy mayor. In November 2025, Little promoted independent conservative councillor Diane Calvert as chair of the Wellington City Council's budget committee and independent conservative councillor Ray Chung as chair of the council-controlled organisations committee. The four Green-aligned councillors criticised Chung's nomination due to his smear campaign against the previous Mayor Tory Whanau but agreed to support Little's nominations in the "interests of being constructive partners."

In late November 2025, Little and the Labour-aligned councillors supported reviewing the contentious Golden Mile pedestrianisation project for three-to-six months. The Green-aligned councillors and iwi representatives Holden Hohaia and Liz Kelly opposed farther delays to the Golden Mile project, which the Council had begun planning in 2021. The motion to implement a three-to-six months review of the Golden Mile project passed by a margin of 12 to 4 votes; with Little, the Labour councillors and the independents supporting the motion and the Green councillors opposing it.

In February 2026, Little called for an independent inquiry into the failure of Wellington's Moa Point sewage plant.

On 8 June 2026, Little declared a state of emergency in Wellington's southern and eastern wards in response to heavy swells. Residents of Owhiro Bay, Island Bay, Houghton Bay and Breaker Bay were ordered to evacuate by 9am on 9 June.

On 18 June, Little as Mayor joined the majority of the Wellington City Council in voting to discontinue work on the $139 million Golden Mile pedestrianisation project. The Council decided to instead explore improving transport links in the Golden Mile and regenerating Courtenay Place.

== Personal life ==
In 2009, Little was diagnosed with early-stage prostate cancer, which was successfully treated.

Little lives in Island Bay, Wellington with his wife Leigh and their son.

== See also ==
- Shadow Cabinet of Andrew Little
- Politics of New Zealand

== Notes ==
Party political offices
Preceded by Mike Williams	President of the Labour Party; 2009–2011	Succeeded by Moira Coatsworth
Preceded by David Cunliffe	Leader of the Labour Party; 2014–2017	Succeeded by Jacinda Ardern
Political offices
Preceded by David Cunliffe	Leader of the Opposition; 2014–2017	Succeeded by Jacinda Ardern
Preceded by Chris Finlayson	Minister for Treaty of Waitangi Negotiations; 2017–2023	Succeeded by Paul Goldsmith
Preceded by Chris Finlayson	Minister Responsible for GCSB; 2017–2023	Succeeded by Judith Collins
Preceded by Chris Finlayson	Minister Responsible for NZSIS; 2017–2023	Succeeded by Judith Collins
Preceded by Amy Adams	Minister of Justice; 2017–2020	Succeeded by Kris Faafoi
Preceded by Amy Adams	Minister for Courts; 2017–2020	Succeeded by William Sio
Preceded by Iain Lees-Galloway	Minister for Workplace Relations and Safety; 2020	Succeeded by Michael Wood
Preceded by Chris Hipkins	Minister of Health; 2020–2023	Succeeded by Ayesha Verrall
Preceded by Chris Hipkins	Minister for the Public Service; 2023	Succeeded by Nicola Willis
Preceded by Peeni Henare	Minister of Defence; 2023	Succeeded by Judith Collins
Preceded by Michael Wood	Minister of Immigration; 2023	Succeeded by Erica Stanford
Preceded by Tory Whanau	Mayor of Wellington; 2025–present	Incumbent
