= Jill Day (politician) =

New Zealand politician

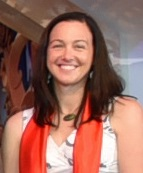
- Day in 2021

37th President of the Labour Party
- Incumbent
- Assumed office 5 November 2022
- Prime Minister: Jacinda Ardern; Chris Hipkins
- Vice President: Carol Beaumont
- Preceded by: Claire Szabó

25th Deputy Mayor of Wellington
- In office 27 September 2017 – 30 October 2019
- Mayor: Justin Lester
- Preceded by: Paul Eagle
- Succeeded by: Sarah Free

Wellington City Councillor for the Takapū/Northern Ward
- In office 2016–2022 Serving with Malcolm Sparrow & Peter Gilberd
- Succeeded by: Ben McNulty, Tony Randle, John Apanowicz

Personal details
- Born: 1978 or 1979 (age 46–47) Palmerston North, New Zealand
- Party: Labour
- Children: 3
- Education: Victoria University of Wellington
- Profession: Teacher

Jillian Marie Day (born 1978 or 1979) is a New Zealand politician. She is the president of the New Zealand Labour Party, and was deputy mayor of Wellington from 2017 to 2019.

== Early life and family ==
Of Ngāti Tūwharetoa descent, Day was born in Palmerston North and also lived in Christchurch before moving to Wellington when she was 14 years old. She holds a science degree in biochemistry, genetics, and molecular biology from Victoria University of Wellington and a post graduate diploma in primary teaching, and went on to become a primary school teacher in Wellington.

She lives in Tawa with her husband and three children. She was a stay-at-home mum for 10 years until her youngest child started school, when she re-entered the workforce with a part-time job helping children who were falling behind with literacy skills.

== Political career ==
=== Wellington City Council ===
Day was the president of the local playcentre and managed the Bikes in Schools programme, where she often lobbied her local councillor Justin Lester, who encouraged her to run for the council herself.

Day felt urged to run for the Wellington City Council after meeting a homeless family in 2016. Though running as an independent, she stated that "it's pretty clear I'm a left-leaning political being". In the 2016 elections, she succeeded Justin Lester, who was elected mayor, in the Northern ward, and became the first Māori woman to be elected to the council. On 28 September 2017, less than a year into her first term, she was appointed deputy mayor by Lester, replacing Paul Eagle who had been elected to parliament in the general election. She held this position until 2019 when Lester lost the mayoral election to Andy Foster.

In the 2019–2022 term, she was chair of the Strategy and Policy Committee until June 2021 and thereafter chair of the Social, Cultural and Economic Committee. In these roles she drove the process to create a Māori ward in Wellington.

In February 2022, she announced she would not stand again for Council at the 2022 election, instead running for and being elected to the Tawa Community Board. She was elected as an independent candidate, topping the poll with more votes than any other candidate, and was similarly re-elected in first place in 2025. She currently serves as chair of the board.

=== Labour Party ===
Day joined the Labour Party before the 2020 general election. In July 2022, she was elected unopposed to be the next president of the Labour Party after Claire Szabó stated she would not seek re-election that year. She was the only nomination to take over from Szabó at the 2022 Labour Party annual conference. Her election as president was confirmed in November 2022 at the conference.

Party political offices
| Preceded by Claire Szabó | President of the Labour Party; 2022–present | Incumbent |
Political offices
| Preceded by Paul Eagle | Deputy Mayor of Wellington; 2017–2019 | Succeeded by Sarah Free |
