= Shadow Cabinet of Andrew Little =

New Zealand shadow cabinet (2014–2017)

Andrew Little assembled a shadow cabinet after he was elected Leader of the Labour Party in New Zealand. He composed this of individuals who acted for the party as spokespeople in assigned roles while he was Leader of the Opposition (2014–17). As the Labour Party formed the largest party not in government, this Frontbench team was as a result the Official Opposition of the New Zealand House of Representatives.

== November 2014 ==
Little announced his first shadow cabinet line-up on 24 November 2014, shortly after his election as leader.

| Rank | Spokesperson | Portfolio |
|---|---|---|
| 1 | Andrew Little | Leader of the Opposition; Spokesperson for the Security Intelligence Service |
| 2 | Hon Annette King | Deputy Leader; Spokesperson for Health |
| 3 | Grant Robertson | Spokesperson for Finance |
| 4 | Hon Nanaia Mahuta | Spokesperson for Māori Development |
| 5 | Phil Twyford | Spokesperson for Housing; Spokesperson for Transport |
| 6 | Chris Hipkins | Shadow Leader of the House; Senior Whip; Spokesperson for Education; Spokesperson for Early Childhood Education |
| 7 | Carmel Sepuloni | Spokesperson for Social Development; Junior Whip |
| 8 | Kelvin Davis | Spokesperson for Police; Spokesperson for Corrections; Associate Spokesperson for Justice (Sexual and Domestic Violence); Associate Spokesperson for Education (Māori Education); Associate Spokesperson for Regional Development |
| 9 | Jacinda Ardern | Spokesperson for Justice; Spokesperson for Children; Spokesperson for Small Business; Spokesperson for Arts, Culture and Heritage |
| 10 | Dr David Clark | Spokesperson for Economic Development; Associate Spokesperson for Finance; Associate Spokesperson for Health (Mental Health) |
| 11 | William Sio | Spokesperson for Pacific Island Affairs; Spokesperson for Local Government; Associate Spokesperson for Housing (South Auckland); Spokesperson for Interfaith Dialogue |
| 12 | Iain Lees-Galloway | Spokesperson for Labour |
| 13 | Dr Megan Woods | Spokesperson for the Environment; Spokesperson for Climate Change |
| 14 | Hon David Cunliffe | Spokesperson for Regional Development; Spokesperson for Tertiary Education; Spokesperson for Research & Development; Spokesperson for Science and Innovation; Associate Spokesperson for Economic Development |
| 15 | Hon David Parker | Spokesperson for Trade and Export Growth; Shadow Attorney General; Spokesperson for Treaty of Waitangi Negotiations |
| 16 | David Shearer | Spokesperson for Foreign Affairs; Spokesperson for Consumer Affairs |
| 17 | Hon Phil Goff | Spokesperson for Defence; Spokesperson for Veterans' Affairs; Spokesperson for Disarmament; Spokesperson for Auckland Issues; Spokesperson for Ethnic Affairs |
| 18 | Hon Trevor Mallard | Assistant Speaker; Spokesperson for Internal Affairs (excluding Gambling); Spokesperson for Sport and Recreation; Spokesperson for Animal Rights; Spokesperson for Parliamentary Reform |
| 19 | Hon Ruth Dyson | Spokesperson for Conservation; Spokesperson for Senior Citizens; Spokesperson for Disability Issues; Spokesperson for Canterbury Earthquake Recovery |
| 20 | Hon Damien O'Connor | Spokesperson for Primary Industries; Spokesperson for Biosecurity; Spokesperson for Food Safety |
| 21 | Hon Clayton Cosgrove | Spokesperson for Revenue; Spokesperson for State Owned Enterprises; Spokesperson for Building and Construction; Spokesperson for the Earthquake Commission; Associate Spokesperson for Finance |
| 22 | Sue Moroney | Spokesperson for ACC; Spokesperson for Immigration; Spokesperson for Women's Affairs; Associate Spokesperson for Labour |
| 23 | Clare Curran | Spokesperson for ICT; Spokesperson for Broadcasting; Spokesperson for Open Government; Associate Spokesperson for Justice; Associate Spokesperson for Commerce |
| 24 | Kris Faafoi | Spokesperson for Commerce; Spokesperson for State Services; Spokesperson for Racing; Assistant Whip |
| 25 | Louisa Wall | Spokesperson for Youth Affairs; Associate Spokesperson for Auckland Issues (South Auckland); Associate Spokesperson for Sport and Recreation |
| 26 | Stuart Nash | Spokesperson for Forestry; Spokesperson for Energy; Spokesperson for Land Information; Spokesperson for Statistics |
| 27 | Rino Tirikatene | Spokesperson for Fisheries; Associate Spokesperson for Regional Development; Spokesperson for Customs |
| 28 | Meka Whaitiri | Spokesperson for Water; Associate Spokesperson for Regional Development; Associate Spokesperson for Finance; Associate Spokesperson for Primary Industries |
| 29 | Poto Williams | Spokesperson for the Community and Voluntary Sector; Associate Spokesperson for Housing (Christchurch); Associate Spokesperson for Justice (Family); Associate Spokesperson for Education (Christchurch Schools) |
| 30 | Peeni Henare | Spokesperson for Tourism; Associate Spokesperson for Māori Development (Employment & Te Reo Māori); Spokesperson for State Owned Enterprises |
| 31 | Adrian Rurawhe | Spokesperson for Civil Defence and Emergency Management; Associate Spokesperson for Internal Affairs (Gambling); Associate Spokesperson for Treaty of Waitangi Negotiations |
| 32 | Jenny Salesa | Spokesperson for Employment, Skills and Training |

== November 2015 ==
Little reshuffled his shadow cabinet on 30 November 2015, one year into his leadership. Media reporting noted the demotions of Nanaia Mahuta and the former leader David Cunliffe. Another former leader, Phil Goff, was moved to the lowest ranking, but this reflected his reduced Parliamentary activity during his campaign for the Auckland mayoralty.

| Rank | Spokesperson | Portfolio |
|---|---|---|
| 1 | Andrew Little | Leader of the Opposition; Spokesperson for the Security Intelligence Service |
| 2 | Hon Annette King | Deputy Leader; Spokesperson for Health |
| 3 | Grant Robertson | Spokesperson for Finance; Spokesperson for Employment |
| 4 | Phil Twyford | Spokesperson for Housing, Building and Construction; Spokesperson for Auckland Issues; Associate Spokesperson for Transport (Auckland and Ports) |
| 5 | Jacinda Ardern | Spokesperson for Justice; Spokesperson for Children; Spokesperson for Small Business; Spokesperson for Arts, Culture and Heritage; Associate Spokesperson for Auckland Issues |
| 6 | Chris Hipkins | Shadow Leader of the House; Senior Whip; Spokesperson for Education (Including Tertiary Education and Early Childhood Education) |
| 7 | Kelvin Davis | Spokesperson for Māori Development; Spokesperson for Corrections |
| 8 | Carmel Sepuloni | Spokesperson for Social Development; Junior Whip; Associate Spokesperson for Education; Associate Spokesperson for Pacific Island Affairs |
| 9 | Dr David Clark | Spokesperson for Economic Development (including Regional Development); Spokesperson for Trade and Export Growth; Associate Spokesperson for Health; Associate Spokesperson for Finance |
| 10 | Dr Megan Woods | Spokesperson for Canterbury Issues; Spokesperson for Climate Change; Associate Spokesperson for Trade and Export Growth |
| 11 | Hon David Parker | Spokesperson for the Environment; Spokesperson for Water; Spokesperson for State Owned Enterprises; Spokesperson for ICT; Spokesperson for Entrepreneurship; Spokesperson for Regulatory Reform; Shadow Attorney General |
| 12 | Hon Nanaia Mahuta | Spokesperson for Conservation; Spokesperson for Treaty of Waitangi Negotiations; Spokesperson for Whānau Ora |
| 13 | David Shearer | Spokesperson for Foreign Affairs; Associate Spokesperson for Defence |
| 12 | Iain Lees-Galloway | Spokesperson for Workplace Relations and Safety; Spokesperson for Immigration |
| 13 | William Sio | Spokesperson for Pacific Island Affairs; Spokesperson for Interfaith Dialogue; Associate Spokesperson for Foreign Affairs (Pacific Climate Change); Associate Spokesperson for Ethnic Communities |
| 14 | Sue Moroney | Spokesperson for Transport; Spokesperson for ACC; Associate Spokesperson for Workplace Relations and Safety |
| 15 | Hon Damien O'Connor | Spokesperson for Primary Industries; Spokesperson for Biosecurity; Spokesperson for Food Safety |
| 16 | Hon Clayton Cosgrove | Spokesperson for Commerce; Spokesperson for Veterans' Affairs; Spokesperson for Tourism; Associate Spokesperson for Finance |
| 17 | Stuart Nash | Spokesperson for Police; Spokesperson for Revenue; Spokesperson for Energy; Spokesperson for Forestry; Associate Spokesperson for Economic Development |
| 18 | Meka Whaitiri | Spokesperson for Local Government; Associate Spokesperson for Primary Industries; Associate Spokesperson for Food Safety |
| 19 | Jenny Salesa | Spokesperson for Skills and Training; Associate Spokesperson for Education; Associate Spokesperson for Health; Associate Spokesperson for Employment |
| 20 | Peeni Henare | Spokesperson for Urban Māori; Spokesperson for Māori Broadcasting; Associate Spokesperson for Māori Development; Associate Spokesperson for Economic Development |
| 21 | Clare Curran | Spokesperson for Broadcasting; Spokesperson for Open Government; Spokesperson for Civil Defence and Emergency Management; Associate Spokesperson for ICT; Associate Spokesperson for Commerce |
| 22 | Kris Faafoi | Spokesperson for State Services; Spokesperson for Racing; Spokesperson for Consumer Affairs; Associate Spokesperson for Broadcasting; Assistant Whip |
| 23 | Hon Trevor Mallard | Assistant Speaker; Spokesperson for Sport and Recreation; Spokesperson for Animal Welfare; Spokesperson for Parliamentary Reform |
| 24 | Hon Ruth Dyson | Spokesperson for Senior Citizens; Spokesperson for Women's Affairs; Spokesperson for Statistics; Associate Spokesperson for Ethnic Communities (South Island) |
| 25 | Rino Tirikatene | Spokesperson for Fisheries; Spokesperson for Customs |
| 26 | Hon David Cunliffe | Spokesperson for Disarmament; Spokesperson for Research and Development; Spokesperson for Science and Innovation; Spokesperson for Land Information; Associate Spokesperson for Education (Tertiary); Undersecretary to the Leader on Superannuation Issues |
| 29 | Poto Williams | Spokesperson for the Community and Voluntary Sector; Spokesperson for Disability Issues; Associate Spokesperson for Justice (Sexual & Domestic Violence) |
| 30 | Louisa Wall | Spokesperson for Courts; Spokesperson for Youth Affairs; Associate Spokesperson for Justice (Legal Aid); Associate Spokesperson for Sport and Recreation |
| 31 | Adrian Rurawhe | Spokesperson for Internal Affairs; Associate Spokesperson for Education (Māori) |
| 32 | Hon Phil Goff | Spokesperson for Defence; Spokesperson for Ethnic Communities; Associate Spokesperson for Veterans' Affair |

== December 2016 ==
Little announced a reshuffled shadow cabinet on 16 December 2016, reflecting the retirements of Phil Goff and David Shearer, the imminent retirement of David Cunliffe, and the election to Parliament of Michael Wood.

| Rank | Spokesperson | Portfolio |
|---|---|---|
| 1 | Andrew Little | Leader of the Opposition; Spokesperson for the Security Intelligence Service; Spokesperson for New Economy |
| 2 | Hon Annette King | Deputy Leader; Spokesperson for Health |
| 3 | Grant Robertson | Spokesperson for Finance; Spokesperson for Employment |
| 4 | Phil Twyford | Spokesperson for Housing, Building and Construction; Spokesperson for Auckland Issues; Associate Spokesperson for Transport (Auckland and Ports) |
| 5 | Jacinda Ardern | Spokesperson for Justice; Spokesperson for Children; Spokesperson for Small Business; Spokesperson for Arts, Culture and Heritage; Associate Spokesperson for Auckland Issues |
| 6 | Chris Hipkins | Spokesperson for Education (Including Tertiary Education and Early Childhood Education); Shadow Leader of the House |
| 7 | Kelvin Davis | Spokesperson for Māori Development; Spokesperson for Corrections |
| 8 | Carmel Sepuloni | Junior Whip; Spokesperson for Social Development; Associate Spokesperson for Education; Associate Spokesperson for Pacific Island Affairs |
| 9 | Dr David Clark | Spokesperson for Economic Development (including Regional Development); Spokesperson for Trade and Export Growth; Associate Spokesperson for Health; Associate Spokesperson for Finance |
| 10 | Dr Megan Woods | Spokesperson for Canterbury Issues; Spokesperson for Climate Change; Spokesperson for State Services; Associate Spokesperson for Trade and Export Growth |
| 11 | Hon David Parker | Spokesperson for Foreign Affairs; Spokesperson for the Environment; Spokesperson for Water; Spokesperson for Entrepreneurship; Spokesperson for Regulatory Reform; Shadow Attorney General |
| 12 | Hon Nanaia Mahuta | Spokesperson for Conservation; Spokesperson for Treaty of Waitangi Negotiations; Spokesperson for Whānau Ora |
| 13 | Iain Lees-Galloway | Spokesperson for Workplace Relations and Safety; Spokesperson for Immigration; Spokesperson for Defence |
| 14 | William Sio | Spokesperson for Pacific Island Affairs; Spokesperson for Interfaith Dialogue; Associate Spokesperson for Foreign Affairs (Pacific Climate Change); Associate Spokesperson for Ethnic Communities |
| 15 | Sue Moroney | Spokesperson for Transport; Spokesperson for ACC; Associate Spokesperson for Workplace Relations and Safety |
| 16 | Hon Damien O'Connor | Spokesperson for Primary Industries; Spokesperson for Biosecurity; Spokesperson for Food Safety |
| 17 | Stuart Nash | Spokesperson for Police; Spokesperson for Energy; Spokesperson for State Owned Enterprises; Spokesperson for Forestry; Spokesperson for Innovation and Science; Spokesperson for Research and Development |
| 18 | Meka Whaitiri | Spokesperson for Local Government; Associate Spokesperson for Primary Industries; Associate Spokesperson for Food Safety |
| 19 | Kris Faafoi | Senior Whip; Spokesperson for Racing; Spokesperson for Tourism; Associate Spokesperson for Broadcasting |
| 20 | Jenny Salesa | Spokesperson for Skills and Training; Associate Spokesperson for Education; Associate Spokesperson for Health; Associate Spokesperson for Employment |
| 21 | Peeni Henare | Spokesperson for Urban Māori; Spokesperson for Māori Broadcasting; Associate Spokesperson for Māori Development; Associate Spokesperson for Economic Development |
| 22 | Clare Curran | Spokesperson for ICT; Spokesperson for Broadcasting; Spokesperson for Open Government; Spokesperson for Civil Defence and Emergency Management; Associate Spokesperson for Commerce |
| 23 | Hon Trevor Mallard | Assistant Speaker; Spokesperson for Sport and Recreation; Spokesperson for Animal Welfare; Spokesperson for Parliamentary Reform |
| 24 | Hon Ruth Dyson | Spokesperson for Senior Citizens; Spokesperson for Women's Affairs; Spokesperson for Statistics; Associate Spokesperson for Ethnic Communities (South Island) |
| 25 | Rino Tirikatene | Spokesperson for Fisheries; Spokesperson for Customs |
| 26 | Hon David Cunliffe | Spokesperson for Land Information; Undersecretary to the Leader on Superannuation Issues |
| 27 | Poto Williams | Spokesperson for the Community and Voluntary Sector; Spokesperson for Disability Issues; Associate Spokesperson for Justice (Sexual & Domestic Violence) |
| 28 | Louisa Wall | Spokesperson for Courts; Spokesperson for Youth Affairs; Associate Spokesperson for Justice (Legal Aid); Associate Spokesperson for Sport and Recreation |
| 29 | Adrian Rurawhe | Spokesperson for Internal Affairs; Associate Spokesperson for Education (Māori) |
| 30 | Hon Clayton Cosgrove | Spokesperson for Commerce; Spokesperson for Veterans Affairs; Spokesperson for Business Outreach; Associate Spokesperson for Finance |
| 31 | Michael Wood | Spokesperson for Consumer Affairs; Spokesperson for Ethnic Communities; Spokesperson for Revenue |

== March 2017 ==
A further reshuffle took place on 8 March 2017. This reflected Annette King's announcement of her retirement from politics at the next election and resignation as deputy leader, the election of Jacinda Ardern as her successor, and the return to Parliament of Raymond Huo following Ardern's win in the Mount Albert by-election and consequent vacation of her list seat.

| Rank | Spokesperson | Portfolio |
|---|---|---|
| 1 | Andrew Little | Leader of the Opposition; Spokesperson for the Security Intelligence Service; Spokesperson for New Economy |
| 2 | Jacinda Ardern | Deputy Leader; Spokesperson for Justice; Spokesperson for Children; Spokesperson for Small Business; Spokesperson for Arts, Culture and Heritage; Associate Spokesperson for Auckland Issues |
| 3 | Grant Robertson | Spokesperson for Finance; Spokesperson for Employment |
| 4 | Phil Twyford | Spokesperson for Housing, Building and Construction; Spokesperson for Auckland Issues; Associate Spokesperson for Transport (Auckland and Ports) |
| 5 | Dr Megan Woods | Spokesperson for Canterbury Issues; Spokesperson for Climate Change; Spokesperson for Energy; Spokesperson of Innovation and Science; Spokesperson for Research and Development; Associate Spokesperson for Trade and Export Growth |
| 6 | Chris Hipkins | Spokesperson for Education (Including Tertiary Education and Early Childhood Education); Shadow Leader of the House |
| 7 | Kelvin Davis | Spokesperson for Corrections; Spokesperson for Maori Development; Spokesperson for Treaty of Waitangi Negotiations |
| 8 | Carmel Sepuloni | Junior Whip; Spokesperson for Social Development; Associate Spokesperson for Education; Associate Spokesperson for Pacific Island Affairs |
| 9 | Dr David Clark | Spokesperson for Health; Associate Spokesperson for Finance |
| 10 | Hon David Parker | Shadow Attorney General; Spokesperson for the Environment; Spokesperson for Foreign Affairs; Spokesperson for Water; Spokesperson for Regulatory Reform; Spokesperson for Entrepreneurship & Trade and Export Growth |
| 11 | Hon Nanaia Mahuta | Spokesperson for Conservation; Spokesperson for Whanau Ora |
| 12 | Stuart Nash | Spokesperson for Police; Spokesperson for Forestry; Spokesperson for Economic Development (Including Regional Development) |
| 13 | Meka Whaitiri | Spokesperson for Local Government; Associate Spokesperson for Primary Industries; Associate Spokesperson for Food Safety |
| 14 | Iain Lees-Galloway | Spokesperson for Workplace Relations and Safety; Spokesperson for Immigration; Spokesperson for Defence |
| 15 | William Sio | Spokesperson for Pacific Island Affairs; Spokesperson for Interfaith Dialogue; Associate Spokesperson for Foreign Affairs (Pacific Climate Change); Associate Spokesperson for Ethnic Communities |
| 16 | Sue Moroney | Spokesperson for Transport; Spokesperson for ACC; Associate Spokesperson for Workplace Relations and Safety |
| 17 | Hon Damien O'Connor | Spokesperson for Primary Industries; Spokesperson for Biosecurity; Spokesperson for Food Safety |
| 18 | Kris Faafoi | Senior Whip; Spokesperson for Racing; Spokesperson for Tourism; Associate Spokesperson for Broadcasting |
| 19 | Jenny Salesa | Spokesperson for Skills and Training; Associate Spokesperson for Education; Associate Spokesperson for Health; Associate Spokesperson for Employment |
| 20 | Peeni Henare | Spokesperson for Urban Maori; Spokesperson for Maori Broadcasting; Spokesperson for State Owned Enterprises; Associate Spokesperson for Māori Development; Associate Spokesperson for Economic Development |
| 21 | Clare Curran | Spokesperson for ICT; Spokesperson for Broadcasting; Spokesperson for Open Government; Spokesperson for Civil Defense and Emergency Management; Associate Spokesperson for Commerce |
| 22 | Adrian Rurawhe | Spokesperson for Internal Affairs; Associate Spokesperson for Education (Māori) |
| 23 | Hon Annette King | Spokesperson for State Services |
| 24 | Hon Trevor Mallard | Assistant Speaker; Spokesperson for Sport and Recreation; Spokesperson for Animal Welfare; Spokesperson for Parliamentary Reform |
| 25 | Hon Ruth Dyson | Spokesperson for Senior Citizens; Spokesperson for Women's Affairs; Spokesperson for Statistics; Associate Spokesperson for Ethnic Communities (South Island) |
| 26 | Rino Tirikatene | Spokesperson for Fisheries; Spokesperson for Customs |
| 27 | Poto Williams | Spokesperson for Community and Voluntary Sector; Spokesperson for Disability Issues; Associate Spokesperson for Justice (Sexual & Domestic Violence) |
| 28 | Louisa Wall | Spokesperson for Courts; Spokesperson for Youth Affairs; Associate Spokesperson for Justice (Legal Aid); Associate Spokesperson for Sport and Recreation |
| 29 | Hon Clayton Cosgrove | Spokesperson for Commerce; Spokesperson for Veterans Affairs; Spokesperson for Business Outreach; Associate Spokesperson for Finance |
| 30 | Michael Wood | Spokesperson for Consumer Affairs; Spokesperson for Ethnic Communities; Spokesperson for Revenue |
| 31 | Raymond Huo | Spokesperson for Land Information |
