= 2014 New Zealand Labour Party leadership election =

New Zealand party leadership election

- 18 November 2014

>50% of votes in an electoral college required to win
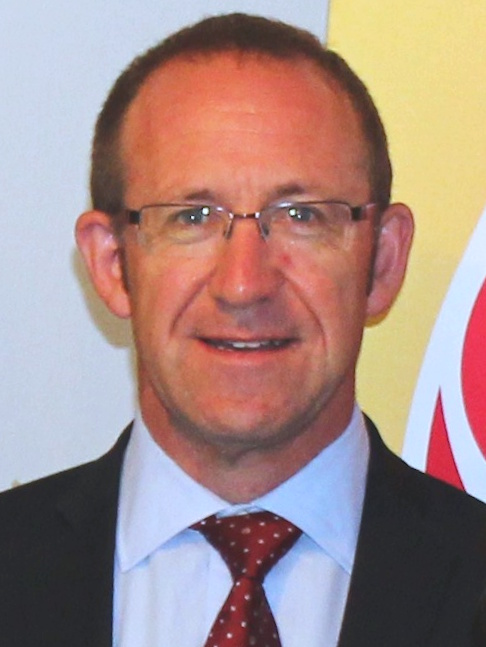

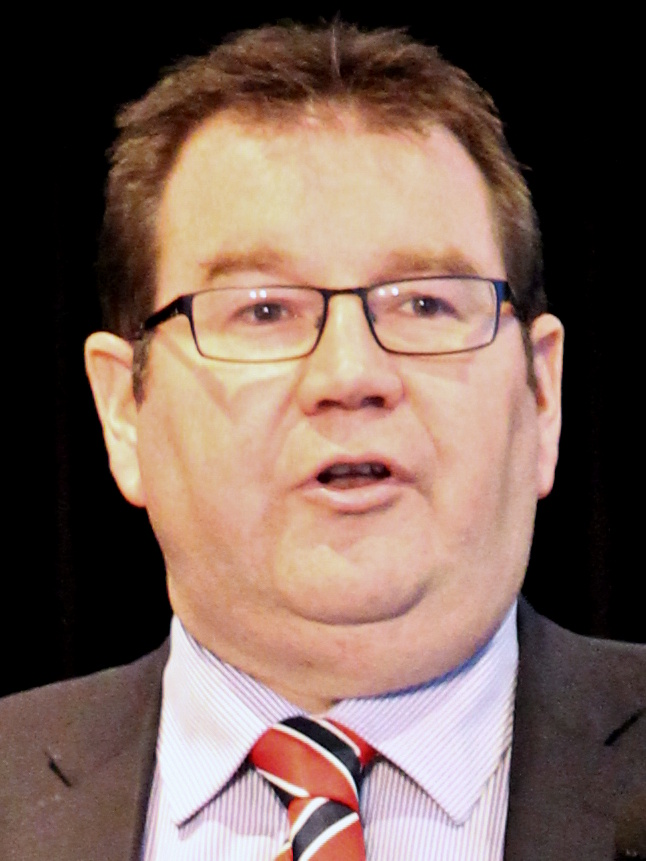

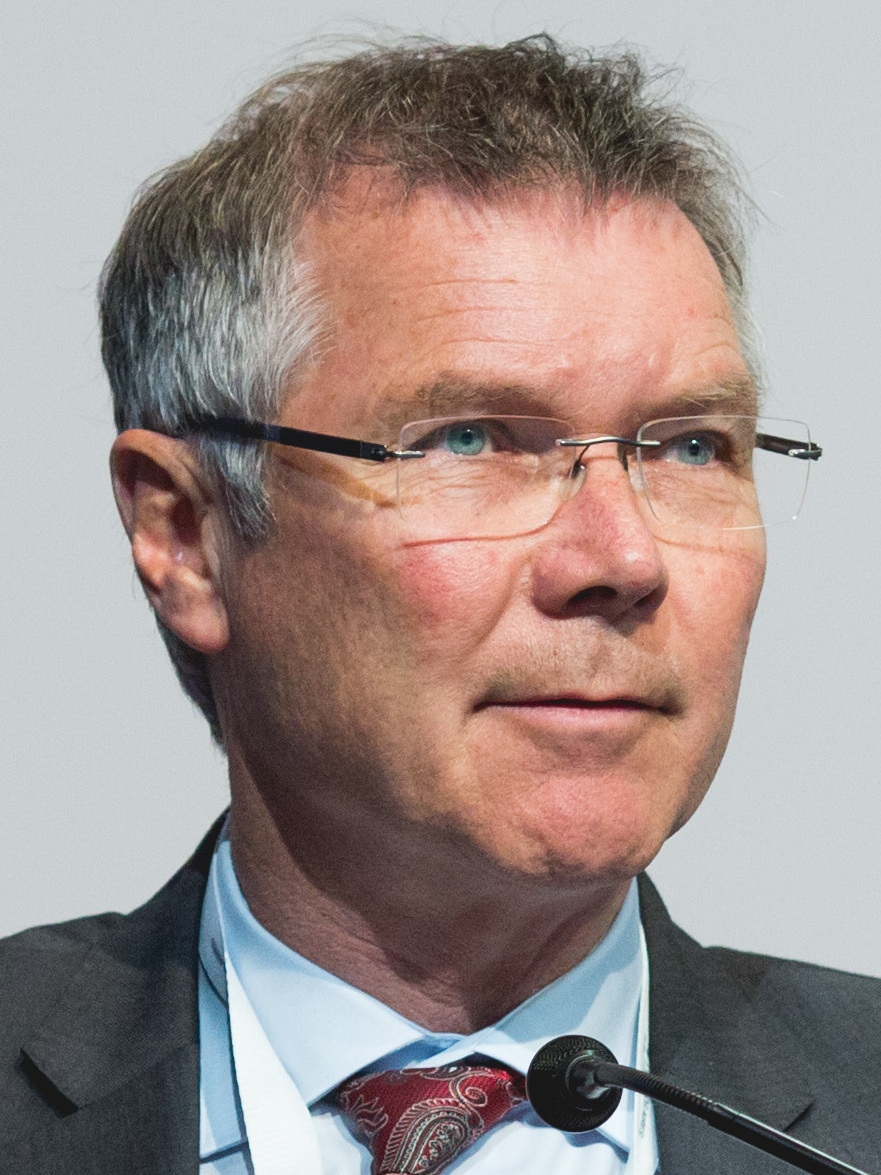

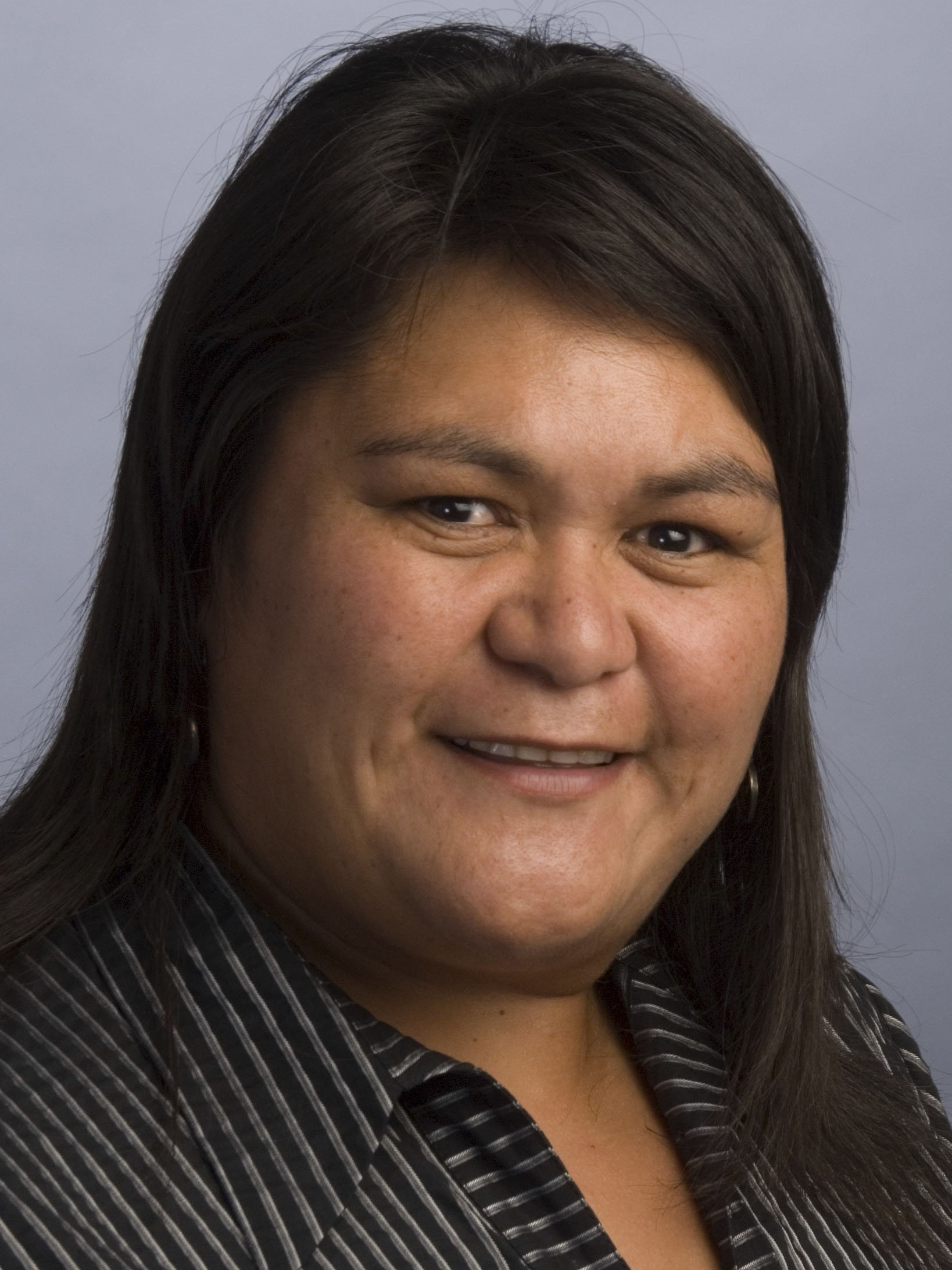
Candidate	Andrew Little	Grant Robertson
Leader's seat	List	Wellington Central
Round 1 %	29.36%	36.58%
Round 2 %	42.42%	37.91%
Round 3 %	50.52%	49.48%
Candidate	David Parker	Nanaia Mahuta
Leader's seat	List	Hauraki-Waikato
Round 1 %	19.17%	14.89%
Round 2 %	20.58%	excluded
Round 3 %	excluded	excluded
Leader before election
David Parker (interim)
David Cunliffe
Elected Leader
Andrew Little

The New Zealand Labour Party held an election for the position of leader of the party on 18 November 2014; Andrew Little won said election.

The election followed the resignation of leader David Cunliffe on 27 September 2014 after an historic general election defeat a week earlier. David Parker and Annette King were installed as interim leader and deputy leader, respectively. Nominations for the leadership closed on 14 October, and Labour Party members met the candidates in 14 hustings meetings throughout the country. The results of the contest were announced on 18 November. Under Labour Party rules, party members have 40% of the votes, caucus members have another 40% of the votes, and affiliated unions have 20% of the votes.

David Cunliffe was the first person to put forward their nomination, but he later withdrew from the contest on 13 October. Candidates, in the order of their nominations being put forward, were Grant Robertson, Andrew Little, David Parker and Nanaia Mahuta.

As of 2024, the 2014 Labour Party leadership election is the most recent leadership election where party members voted in the election, as well as the most recent one to be contested by multiple MPs.

== Background ==
The Labour Party has remained in opposition since the Fifth Labour Government was voted out in the 2008 general election. The Labour Party's leader, Helen Clark, resigned on election night and was replaced days later by long-serving MP and former Cabinet minister Phil Goff. Labour's vote decreased to 27% at the 2011 general election and Goff subsequently resigned. The leadership election later that year saw David Shearer beat David Cunliffe in a vote of the party's caucus. In 2012 the party rewrote its leadership rules, giving the party's parliamentary caucus 40% of the vote, the party membership 40% and affiliated unions 20%, and using instant-runoff voting if there are more than two candidates. In 2013 Shearer resigned as party leader and the Labour Party elected Cunliffe as its parliamentary leader over Grant Robertson and Shane Jones.

=== 2014 general election ===
The 2014 general election took place on 20 September, and the Fifth National Government was re-elected for a third term. Based on the interim results, the National Party had achieved an absolute majority of seats (61 out of 121), (Note: After counting of special votes, the final result was published on 4 October and National lost one seat to the Green Party; they thus no longer hold an absolute majority) unprecedented under the mixed-member proportional (MMP) representation system in place since the 1996 election. Labour's defeat was of historical proportions; it was, based on interim results of 24.69% (Note: After counting of special votes, the final result was published on 4 October and Labour's party vote had risen to 25.13%) for the party vote the worst result since 1922, when Labour gained 23.70% of the vote in its second general election after the formation of the party in 1916.

Calls for Cunliffe's resignation appeared the day after the election from caucus colleagues, and political commentators pointed out that Cunliffe provided a long list of reasons in his concession speech why Labour had failed to win the election, but that he had failed to point the finger at himself. According to political journalist Andrea Vance, the concession speech was written the day before the election, when the magnitude of the defeat was of course yet unknown. When pressed, Cunliffe refused to resign and rather wanted his caucus colleagues to pass a motion of no confidence, but a no confidence motion was unlikely, as likely contenders would not want to be rushed, and the caucus agreed that no action would be taken until the final election results are released on 4 October. That Cunliffe was not in control of the caucus, with a large majority of caucus members known as not supporting Cunliffe, became clear when Chris Hipkins was elected whip in the 23 September caucus meeting. Whips are supposed to be "loyal lieutenants" to the leader, but Hipkins is a known opponent of Cunliffe, and one of Cunliffe's first actions after his 2013 leadership election was to demote Hipkins.

Cunliffe tendered his resignation on 27 September, triggering the leadership election.

=== Interim leadership ===
While the new leader of the Labour Party was being determined, David Parker and Annette King became leader and deputy leader of the Party.

== Electoral system ==
It was the second leadership election held conducted using the new rules agreed to in 2012, allowing party members to vote. The Labour Party election rules state that the vote is split among the party's caucus, party members and party affiliates (unions) in a 40/40/20 split.

== Candidates ==
Nominations for the leadership closed on 14 October. Between 22 October and 11 November, 14 hustings meetings were held throughout the country for members of the Labour Party. Voting by the Labour membership was possible through the post and online, and the election result were scheduled for announcement on 18 November 2014.

=== Declared ===
Candidate	Electorate	Nominators
Andrew Little	List	Poto Williams
Andrew Little	List	Iain Lees-Galloway
Nanaia Mahuta	Hauraki-Waikato	Louisa Wall
Nanaia Mahuta	Hauraki-Waikato	William Sio
David Parker	List	Jenny Salesa
David Parker	List	Damien O'Connor
Grant Robertson	Wellington Central	Kris Faafoi
Grant Robertson	Wellington Central	Rino Tirikatene

=== Declined to be candidates ===
- David Cunliffe, incumbent leader. Initially planned to contest the election but instead backed Little.
- David Shearer
- Stuart Nash
- Jacinda Ardern

== Result ==
Andrew Little won the leadership contest and became leader of the Labour Party, receiving 50.52 per cent of the vote to Grant Robertson's 49.48 per cent in the final round of the voting reallocations. As a result of the leadership election, Grant Robertson said after two unsuccessful attempts he would not seek the Labour leadership again in the future. David Parker would not answer questions about his future in Parliament, but signalled that he was not interested in retaining the finance portfolio.

=== Overall ===
2014 New Zealand Labour Party leadership election
Candidate	Round 1 %	Round 2 %	Round 3 %
Andrew Little	29.36	42.52	50.52
Grant Robertson	36.58	37.91	49.48
David Parker	19.17	20.58	
Nanaia Mahuta	14.89		
Total	100.00	100.00	100.00
Andrew Little elected leader on 3rd round			

=== Caucus ===
2014 New Zealand Labour Party leadership election – caucus vote (worth 40%)
Candidate	Round 1	%	Round 2	%	Round 3	%
Grant Robertson	14	43.75	14	43.75	18	56.25
Andrew Little	5	15.63	11	34.38	15	43.75
David Parker	7	21.88	7	21.88		
Nanaia Mahuta	6	18.75				
Total	32	100.00	32	100.00	32	100.00

=== Membership ===
Party membership turnout was just under 70%, a 7% increase from the previous leadership election.

2014 New Zealand Labour Party leadership election – membership vote (worth 40%)
Candidate	Round 1	%	Round 2	%	Round 3	%
Grant Robertson		38.25		40.92		55.23
Andrew Little		25.71		34.11		44.77
David Parker		22.41		24.97		
Nanaia Mahuta		13.62				
Total		100.00		100.00		100.00

=== Union affiliates ===
2014 New Zealand Labour Party leadership election – union affiliates vote (worth 20%)
Candidate	Round 1 %	Unions	Round 2 %	Unions	Round 3 %	Unions
Andrew Little	64.12		70.62		75.66	
Grant Robertson	18.91		20.20		24.44	
David Parker	7.28		9.18			
Nanaia Mahuta	9.70					
Total	100.00	7	100.00	7	100.00	7
