= 2011 New Zealand Labour Party leadership election =

New Zealand party leadership election

- 13 December 2011

34 New Zealand Labour Party members of the New Zealand Parliament 18 members needed to win
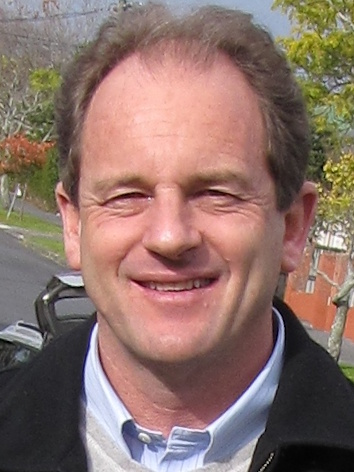

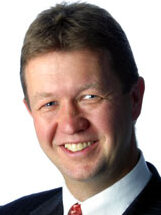
Candidate	David Shearer	David Cunliffe
Leader's seat	Mount Albert	New Lynn
Caucus vote	≥18	<18
Leader before election
Phil Goff
Elected Leader
David Shearer

The 2011 New Zealand Labour Party leadership election was held on 13 December 2011 to choose the thirteenth Leader of the New Zealand Labour Party. A Deputy Leader and a senior and a junior whip were also elected. Following the Labour Party's loss in the 2011 general election, leader Phil Goff and deputy leader Annette King resigned, prompting the leadership election, which was conducted as a secret ballot of the Labour caucus.

David Cunliffe, David Shearer and David Parker stood for the leadership, and Nanaia Mahuta and Grant Robertson contested the deputy position. Cunliffe and Mahuta ran as a ticket. During the campaign Parker pulled out of the race and endorsed Shearer. Shearer and Robertson won the votes for their respective positions. Chris Hipkins and Darien Fenton were chosen as the senior and junior whips, respectively.

== Background ==
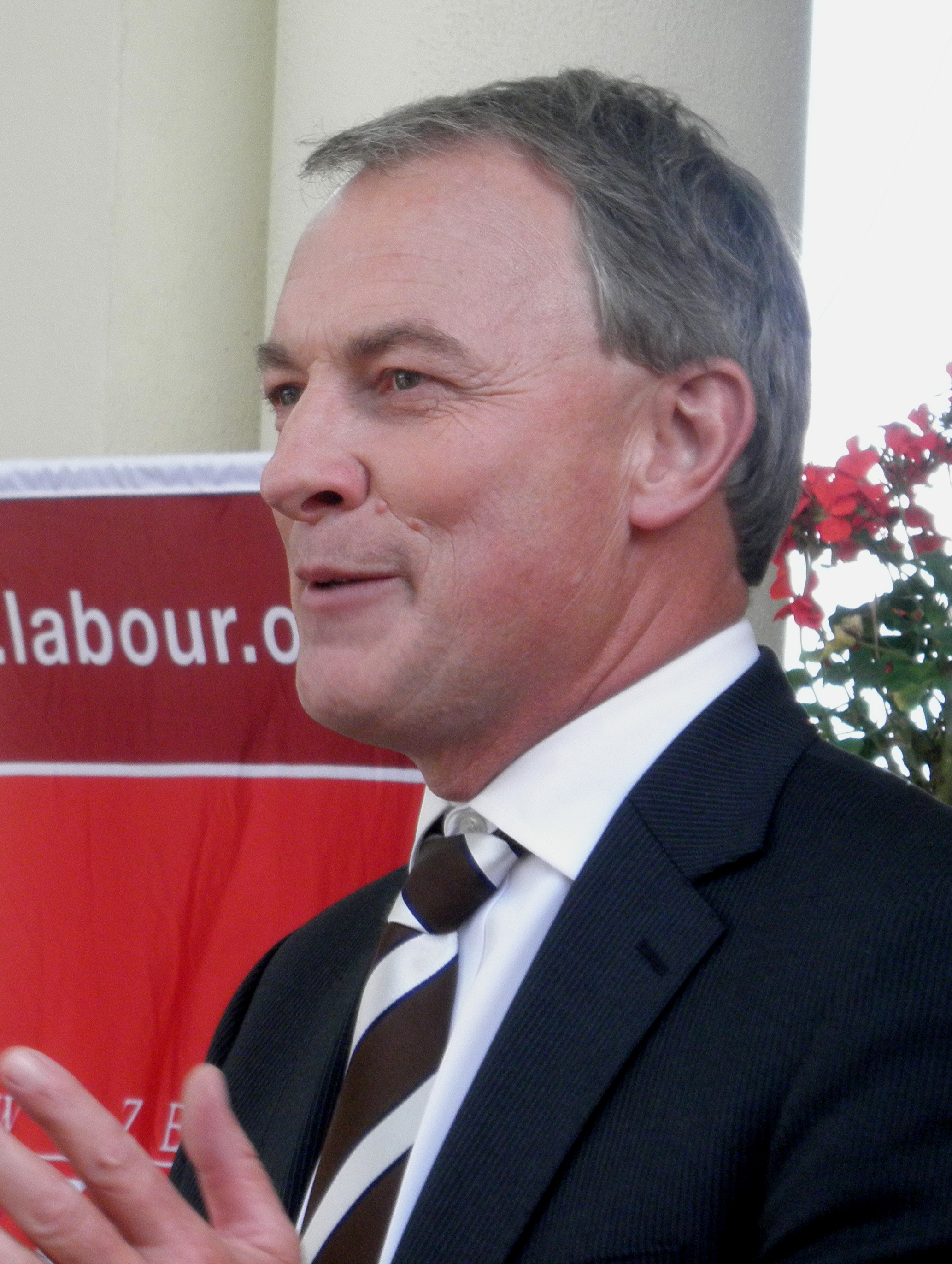
The leadership election followed Phil Goff's resignation as party leader.

At the 2008 general election, the Fifth Labour Government, led by Helen Clark, was defeated by John Key's National Party. Following Clark's election-night resignation, Phil Goff was unanimously elected as the party's leader, with Annette King as deputy, and Darren Hughes and Steve Chadwick as the senior and junior whips, respectively. The party lost more support in the 26 November 2011 general election; its popular vote dipped to 27% – its worst-ever result under the mixed-member proportional representation system – and its number of MPs was reduced from forty-three to thirty-four. On 29 November 2011, Goff and King announced their resignations, effective 13 December. New whips also had to be chosen because Rick Barker (who replaced Hughes as the senior whip in April 2011, following Hughes leaving Parliament) and Chadwick were not re-elected to Parliament.

== Candidates ==
Former Cabinet ministers David Cunliffe (MP for New Lynn) and Nanaia Mahuta (Hauraki-Waikato) ran as a ticket for the leadership and deputy leadership, respectively. Former minister and list MP David Parker and 2009 Mount Albert by-election winner David Shearer were candidates for the party leadership, and Wellington Central representative Grant Robertson sought the deputy leadership. Shane Jones considered standing for the deputy leadership, but in the end did not run. Parker stated his preference for Robertson as deputy leader. Shearer did not indicate a preferred deputy.

Shearer was viewed as unlikely to win the election; Claire Trevett of The New Zealand Herald originally expected that only Cunliffe and Parker would run for the leader's role, and The Dominion Post's Vernon Small wrote that "Mr Shearer's bid is seen as a way to lift his profile". Political commentator Bryce Edwards said that Cunliffe was the more appealing candidate to the public, and described Parker and Robertson as "sort of Phil Goff clones".

== Campaign ==
Labour Party president Moira Coatsworth stated that the leadership contest would be a "robust contest of ideas", and suggested to the party's caucus that a series of meetings with party members be held around New Zealand. These were held from 6 to 11 December in six major cities—Hamilton, Palmerston North, Wellington, Christchurch, Dunedin and Auckland. The party membership was then encouraged to give feedback to the party caucus, who would vote in the election. On 30 November Cunliffe, Parker and Shearer were interviewed by Mark Sainsbury on the current affairs programme Close Up. The television show held a text message poll in which viewers voted for their preferred leader of the party. Over 7,500 people took part; Shearer received 50% of the support, Cunliffe 31% and Parker 19%. The following day, Parker pulled out of the leadership race and put his support behind Shearer. Shearer and Cunliffe were interviewed by Guyon Espiner on political talkshow Q+A on 4 December. During the interview, both candidates indicated their support for the introduction of a capital gains tax, which was a key part of Labour's tax policy during the 2011 general election campaign. Both also disagreed with the 2008 Employment Relations Amendment Act (90-day workplace trial), and wanted New Zealand to invest further in research and development; Shearer mentioned striving for a more green economy. On 9 December, Horizon Research released a demographically-weighted survey which found that 35.4% of adult New Zealanders supported Shearer's bid for the leadership, and 19.9% backed Cunliffe.

== Outcome and aftermath ==
The election took place on 13 December 2011 and comprised a secret ballot of the thirty-four Labour caucus members, meaning a candidate had to receive the support of eighteen MPs to win. Shearer was elected the party leader, Robertson the deputy leader, Chris Hipkins the senior whip and Darien Fenton the junior whip. Upon election, Shearer stated, "I am a fresh face for Labour and I represent a fresh start for New Zealand." Both One News' Espiner and 3 News reported that Shearer received about twenty-two of the thirty-four votes for the leadership position; however, Coatsworth stipulated that the election was secret and that she was the only person who had access to the ballot papers, which were destroyed. Robertson and Jacinda Ardern publicly supported Shearer, and Carmel Sepuloni backed Cunliffe.

On 19 December, Shearer announced a reshuffle of the Labour front bench—Parker replaced Cunliffe in the finance portfolio and number three ranking, Ardern took the number four spot as social development spokesperson, while Cunliffe moved down to number five and gained the economic development portfolio. Clayton Cosgrove (number six) became responsible for state owned enterprises and commerce, Jones (number seven) took regional development and fisheries and Mahuta (number eight) picked up education. Shearer himself took the science and innovation portfolio, while Robertson was made environment spokesperson.
