= 2013 New Zealand Labour Party leadership election =

New Zealand party leadership election

- 15 September 2013

>50% of votes in an electoral college required to win
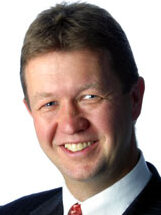

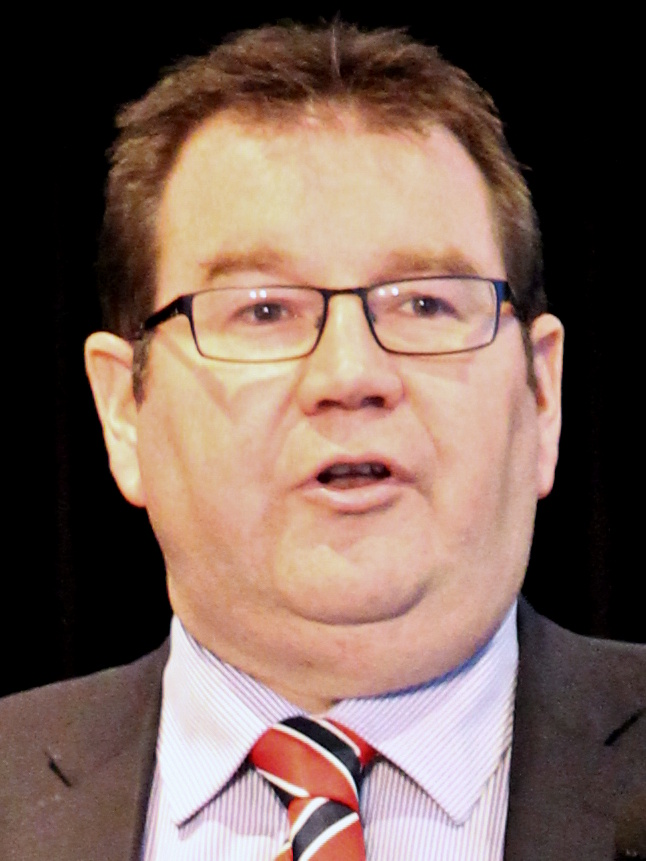

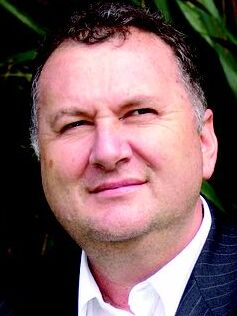
Candidate	David Cunliffe	Grant Robertson	Shane Jones
Leader's seat	New Lynn	Wellington Central	List
Round 1 %	51.15%	32.97%	15.88%
Leader before election
David Shearer
Elected Leader
David Cunliffe

The 2013 New Zealand Labour Party leadership election was held on 15 September 2013 to choose the fourteenth Leader of the New Zealand Labour Party. The election was won by David Cunliffe.

It followed the resignation of leader David Shearer on 22 August 2013. Nominations closed on 26 August 2013.

It was the first leadership election the Party conducted using new party rules agreed in 2012 that allow party members to vote. The Labour Party election rules state that the vote is split among the party's caucus, party members and party affiliates (unions) in a 40/40/20 split. It was also the first time a Labour leadership contest had been contested by more than two participants since 1940.

== Background ==
On 22 August 2013 Shearer announced his resignation as party leader, explaining, "My sense is I no longer have the full confidence of many of my caucus colleagues".

== Candidates ==
Deputy leader Grant Robertson declared he would contest the leadership on 25 August. Former union leader Andrew Little announced he would not contest the leadership vote on the same day. Robertson was nominated by Megan Woods and Jacinda Ardern.

List MP Shane Jones declared he would contest the leadership on 26 August. At a news conference later that day, MP for New Lynn David Cunliffe, declared he would contest the leadership as well. Cunliffe previously stood for the leadership at the 2011 leadership election, and lost to David Shearer and Grant Robertson.

== Opinion polls ==
A TVNZ Colmar Brunton poll published on 25 August found David Cunliffe led the potential contenders with 29% of the popular vote and 32% of Labour Party members, followed by Jacinda Ardern on 15%, Shane Jones on 11%, Grant Robertson on 10% and Andrew Little on 9%. A Research Now poll released by 3 News on 6 September among the public returned 39.6% support for Cunliffe, 31.6% for Jones and 28.8% for Robertson. On 8 September TVNZ published a poll which asked which candidate respondents thought would be most likely to lead the Labour Party at the 2014 election. David Cunliffe was on 39%, Shane Jones on 18% and Grant Robertson on 15%.

== Campaign ==
The first televised debate was held between the candidates on Māori Television on 26 August. A series of 12 candidates meetings will be held throughout the country for Labour Party members. Controversially, all candidates made use of their ability to fly around the country out of the Parliamentary Service's budget.

== Results ==
=== Overall ===
2013 New Zealand Labour Party leadership election
Candidate	Round 1 %	Round 2 %
David Cunliffe	51.15	61.53
Grant Robertson	32.97	38.47
Shane Jones	15.88	
Total	100.00	100.00
David Cunliffe elected leader on 1st round		

=== Caucus ===
2013 New Zealand Labour Party leadership election – caucus vote (worth 40%)
Candidate	Round 1	%	Round 2	%
Grant Robertson	16	47.06	18	52.94
David Cunliffe	11	32.35	16	47.06
Shane Jones	7	20.59		
Total	34	100.00	34	100.00

=== Membership ===
2013 New Zealand Labour Party leadership election – membership vote (worth 40%)
Candidate	Round 1	%	Round 2	%
David Cunliffe	3,243	60.14	3,655	67.79
Grant Robertson	1,440	26.71	1,737	32.21
Shane Jones	709	13.15		
Total	5,392	100.00	5,392	100.00

=== Union affiliates ===
2013 New Zealand Labour Party leadership election – union affiliates vote (worth 20%)
Candidate	Round 1 %	Unions	Round 2 %	Unions
David Cunliffe	70.77	6	78.01	6
Grant Robertson	17.30	0	21.99	0
Shane Jones	11.92	0		
Total	100.00	6	100.00	6

==== By union ====
Dairy Workers Union
Candidate	Round 1	%	Round 2	%
David Cunliffe	33	84.62		
Grant Robertson	0	0.00		
Shane Jones	6	15.38		
Total	39	100.00	39	100.00

Engineering, Printing and Manufacturing Union
Candidate	Round 1	%	Round 2	%
David Cunliffe	35	71.43		
Grant Robertson	8	22.86		
Shane Jones	2	5.71		
Total	45	100.00	45	100.00

Maritime Union
Candidate	Round 1	%	Round 2	%
David Cunliffe	15	93.75		
Grant Robertson	0	0.00		
Shane Jones	1	6.25		
Total	16	100.00	16	100.00

Meat Workers Union
Candidate	Round 1	%	Round 2	%
David Cunliffe	22	75.86		
Grant Robertson	1	3.45		
Shane Jones	6	20.69		
Total	29	100.00	29	100.00

Rail & Maritime Transport Union
Candidate	Round 1	%	Round 2	%
David Cunliffe	18	78.26		
Grant Robertson	3	13.04		
Shane Jones	2	8.70		
Total	23	100.00	23	100.00

Service & Food Workers Union
Candidate	Round 1	%	Round 2	%
David Cunliffe	254	51.11		
Grant Robertson	177	35.61		
Shane Jones	66	13.28		
Total	497	100.00	497	100.00
