= Ellen Margrethe Løj =

Danish diplomat

Special Representative of the Secretary-General for South Sudan
- In office July 2014 – November 2016
- Secretary-General: Ban Ki-moon
- Preceded by: Hilde Frafjord Johnson
- Succeeded by: David Shearer

Personal details
- Born: 17 October 1948 (age 77) Gedesby, Denmark
- Education: Copenhagen University

Ellen Margrethe Løj (born 17 October 1948 in Gedesby, Denmark) is a Danish diplomat. Between 2014 and 2016, she served as the Special Representative and Head of the United Nations Mission in South Sudan (UNMISS). Prior to this appointment of July 2014 by United Nations Secretary-General Ban Ki-moon, Ellen Margrethe Løj served as the Ambassador to the United Nations for Denmark from 2001 until 2007.

== Education ==
Løj has a master's degree in economics from Copenhagen University.

== Career ==
Løj began her diplomatic career in the Danish Foreign Ministry in 1973. From 1977 to 1980 she served as First Secretary of the Danish Permanent Mission to the UN in New York City, U.S. From 1982 to 1985 she served as Counsellor within the European Commission in Brussels, Belgium. From 1986 to 1989 she was Head of Department at the Ministry of Foreign Affairs.

In 1989, Løj was appointed Ambassador to Israel, and served in that position until 1992 when she returned to the Foreign Ministry to serve as an Under Secretary and then State Secretary of the South Group. In 2001, she was appointed Ambassador to the United Nations.

Løj served as Denmark's ambassador to the Czech Republic before she was appointed by the United Nations Secretary-General as Special Representative for Liberia in October 2007. During her time in office, she was also a member of Prime Minister Anders Fogh Rasmussen’s Commission on Effective Development Cooperation with Africa which held meetings between April and October 2008.

== Other activities ==
In addition to her appointments Løj has also been on the supervisory board of the Danish-German ferry company Scandlines since 1998 and a member of the advisory boards of the Industrialization Fund for Developing Countries and the Investment Fund for Central and Eastern Europe.

Between June 2012 and 2014, Løj served as a volunteer Member of the Board of the Centre for Humanitarian Dialogue, a private diplomacy organization whose mission is to prevent armed conflict through dialogue and mediation.
