= Grant Robertson =

New Zealand politician (born 1971)

The Honourable Grant Robertson
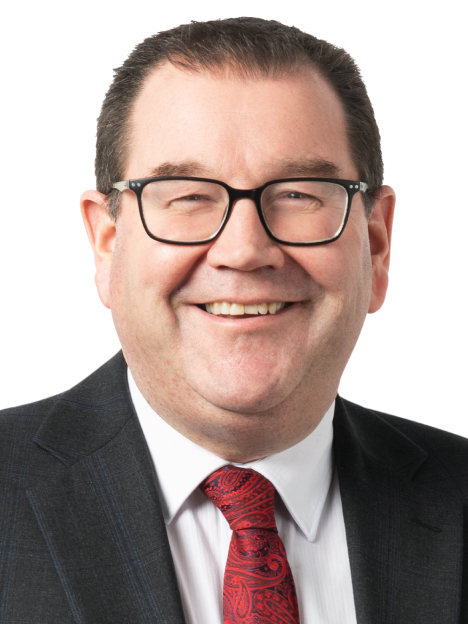
- Robertson in 2023

10th Vice-Chancellor of the University of Otago
- Incumbent
- Assumed office 1 July 2024
- Chancellor: Stephen Higgs
- Preceded by: David Murdoch

19th Deputy Prime Minister of New Zealand
- In office 6 November 2020 – 25 January 2023
- Prime Minister: Jacinda Ardern
- Preceded by: Winston Peters
- Succeeded by: Carmel Sepuloni

29th Minister of Foreign Affairs
- In office 11 November 2023 – 27 November 2023
- Prime Minister: Chris Hipkins
- Preceded by: Nanaia Mahuta
- Succeeded by: Winston Peters

12th Minister of Disarmament and Arms Control
- In office 11 November 2023 – 27 November 2023
- Prime Minister: Chris Hipkins
- Preceded by: Nanaia Mahuta
- Succeeded by: Office abolished

42nd Minister of Finance
- In office 26 October 2017 – 27 November 2023
- Prime Minister: Jacinda Ardern; Chris Hipkins
- Preceded by: Steven Joyce
- Succeeded by: Nicola Willis

12th Leader of the House
- In office 1 February 2023 – 27 November 2023; Acting: 25 January 2023 – 1 February 2023
- Prime Minister: Chris Hipkins
- Preceded by: Chris Hipkins
- Succeeded by: Chris Bishop

11th Minister for Sport and Recreation
- In office 26 October 2017 – 27 November 2023
- Prime Minister: Jacinda Ardern; Chris Hipkins
- Preceded by: Jonathan Coleman
- Succeeded by: Chris Bishop
Other government and opposition roles 2011–2023
4th Minister for Infrastructure
In office 6 November 2020 – 1 February 2023
Prime Minister	Jacinda Ardern; Chris Hipkins
Preceded by	Shane Jones
Succeeded by	Megan Woods
13th Minister for Racing
In office 6 November 2020 – 14 June 2022
Prime Minister	Jacinda Ardern
Preceded by	Winston Peters
Succeeded by	Kieran McAnulty
19th Minister Responsible for the Earthquake Commission
In office 27 June 2019 – 6 November 2020
Prime Minister	Jacinda Ardern
Preceded by	Megan Woods
Succeeded by	David Clark
Deputy Leader of the Opposition
In office 13 December 2011 – 17 September 2013
Leader	David Shearer
Preceded by	Annette King
Succeeded by	David Parker
Deputy Leader of the Labour Party
In office 13 December 2011 – 17 September 2013
Leader	David Shearer
Preceded by	Annette King
Succeeded by	David Parker

Member of the New Zealand Parliament for Wellington Central
- In office 8 November 2008 – 14 October 2023
- Preceded by: Marian Hobbs
- Succeeded by: Tamatha Paul

Member of the New Zealand Parliament for Labour party list
- In office 14 October 2023 – 22 March 2024
- Succeeded by: Glen Bennett

Personal details
- Born: Grant Murray Robertson; 30 October 1971 (age 55) Palmerston North, New Zealand
- Party: Labour
- Spouse: Alf Kaiwai (m. 2009)
- Education: University of Otago

Grant Murray Robertson (born 30 October 1971) is a New Zealand academic administrator and former politician. A member of the Labour Party, he served as the Minister of Finance from 2017 to 2023, as Minister of Foreign Affairs in November 2023, and as the 19th Deputy Prime Minister of New Zealand from 2020 to 2023. He was the member of Parliament (MP) for Wellington Central from 2008 to 2023.

Robertson maintained and competed for several leadership positions during the party's stint in opposition following the end of the Fifth Labour Government. He was elected Labour's deputy leader in 2011 under leader David Shearer, and contested the leadership of the party in both 2013 and 2014. Subsequently, Robertson was named the party's finance spokesperson and was ranked third on Labour's party list. Prime Minister Jacinda Ardern appointed him to the finance portfolio in the Sixth Labour Government. As finance minister, Robertson was prominent in the government's economic response to the COVID-19 pandemic in New Zealand.

Following the 2020 general election he was appointed the 19th Deputy Prime Minister by Prime Minister Ardern. Robertson assumed the role on 6 November. Following the 2023 general election, Robertson resigned on 22 March 2024 to assume the position of Vice-Chancellor of the University of Otago.

== Early life ==
Robertson was born in Palmerston North, the youngest of three boys. His Presbyterian family lived in Hastings before settling in South Dunedin. His mother, Yvonne Wilkie, initially stayed at home before later becoming a teacher. His father, Douglas Robertson, was an accountant and Presbyterian lay-preacher, who was imprisoned in 1991 for stealing around $120,000 from the law firm he worked for. His grandfather Bob Wilkie ran unsuccessfully for Labour in the Wairarapa electorate in 1954 and 1957. Robertson had a paper round as a boy and at 16 he got his first job at a New World supermarket in Dunedin in the fruit and vegetable department preparing fruit and vegetables for display and sale.

Robertson attended King's High School in Dunedin, where he was head boy. He then studied political studies at the University of Otago, graduating with a Bachelor of Arts with honours in 1995. His honours dissertation studied the restructuring of the New Zealand University Students' Association in the 1980s. Robertson served as President of the Otago University Students' Association in 1993 and as co-president of the New Zealand University Students' Association in 1996.

Robertson was interested in politics from a young age. In 2021, North & South described him, at age 10, as having "memorised every major candidate and their electorate in the 1981 general election." Robertson viewed former prime minister David Lange—"an overweight guy with glasses"—as an early political inspiration.

== Professional life ==
Robertson joined the Ministry of Foreign Affairs and Trade (MFAT) in 1997 after leaving university. His overseas postings included the United Nations in New York. Robertson also managed the NZ Overseas Aid Programme to Samoa – a $7.7 million fund with projects in diverse areas such as basic education, healthcare, public sector capacity building, small business development and the empowerment of women. He left MFAT in 2001.

Robertson returned to New Zealand during the first term of the Fifth Labour Government to work as a ministerial advisor to minister for the environment Marian Hobbs and, later, prime minister Helen Clark. His role in Clark's office included liaising with the smaller parties supporting the government. He also had a role in designing Labour's interest-free student loans policy, which was credited with winning the election for Labour. Robertson's influence reportedly resulted in him having the nickname "H3", with "H1" and "H2" being Clark and her chief of staff Heather Simpson respectively.

After the 2005 election, Robertson left the Prime Minister's office to work as a senior research marketing manager for the University of Otago based at the Wellington School of Medicine.

== Political career ==
New Zealand Parliament
Years	Term	Electorate	List	Party
2008–2011	49th	Wellington Central	46	Labour
2011–2014	50th	Wellington Central	14	Labour
2014–2017	51st	Wellington Central	3	Labour
2017–2020	52nd	Wellington Central	4	Labour
2020–2023	53rd	Wellington Central	3	Labour
2023–2024	54th	List	4	Labour

=== 2008 general election ===
In late 2006, the sitting Labour MP for Wellington Central Marian Hobbs announced that she would be retiring at the 2008 New Zealand general election. Robertson was considered to be a front runner and was subsequently selected unopposed. Robertson ran a well-staffed campaign, based on local issues like the closure of the Crossways Community Centre and threats to the Public Service. He was also involved in the formation of a Wellington inner-city residents' association.

The Labour Party list for the 2008 general election ranked Robertson at number 46. In the Wellington Central electorate, Robertson defeated National Party candidate Stephen Franks by 1,904 votes.

=== First term, 2008–2011 ===
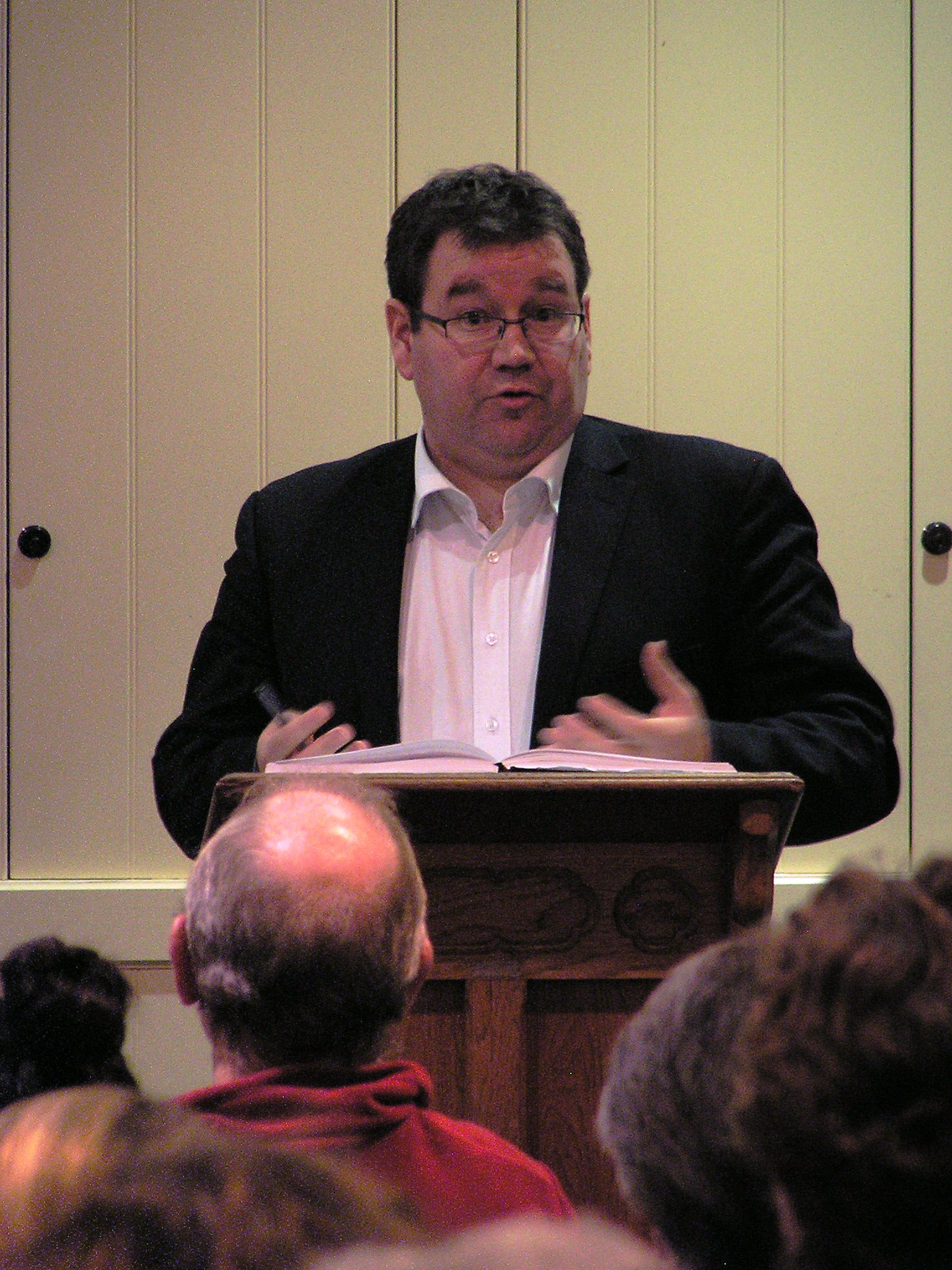
Robertson at post-budget meeting in 2011.

Helen Clark's government was defeated at the 2008 election. Robertson was appointed as the opposition's spokesperson for state services, and associate spokesperson for arts, culture and heritage and foreign affairs by new Labour leader Phil Goff.

In May 2010 Robertson's Ethical Investment (Crown Financial Institutions) Bill was drawn from the member's ballot. According to Robertson, the Bill "sought to have clear and consistent criteria for ethical investment in the legislation that govern our major investment funds such as the Super Fund and ACC." Although the Bill gained support from MPs in the Green and Māori parties, the Bill was defeated at its first reading.

On 15 June 2010, Goff promoted Robertson to be spokesperson for tertiary education and the 20th-ranked Labour MP, the highest of the 2008 intake of Labour MPs to be promoted at that point.

In the election year reshuffle, on 2 February 2011, Robertson was further promoted to the front bench to take the health portfolio. Commenting on the promotion, Phil Goff said that Robertson has "made a very strong impact in a very short time" and that he "has a promising future ahead of him."

=== Second term, 2011–2014 ===
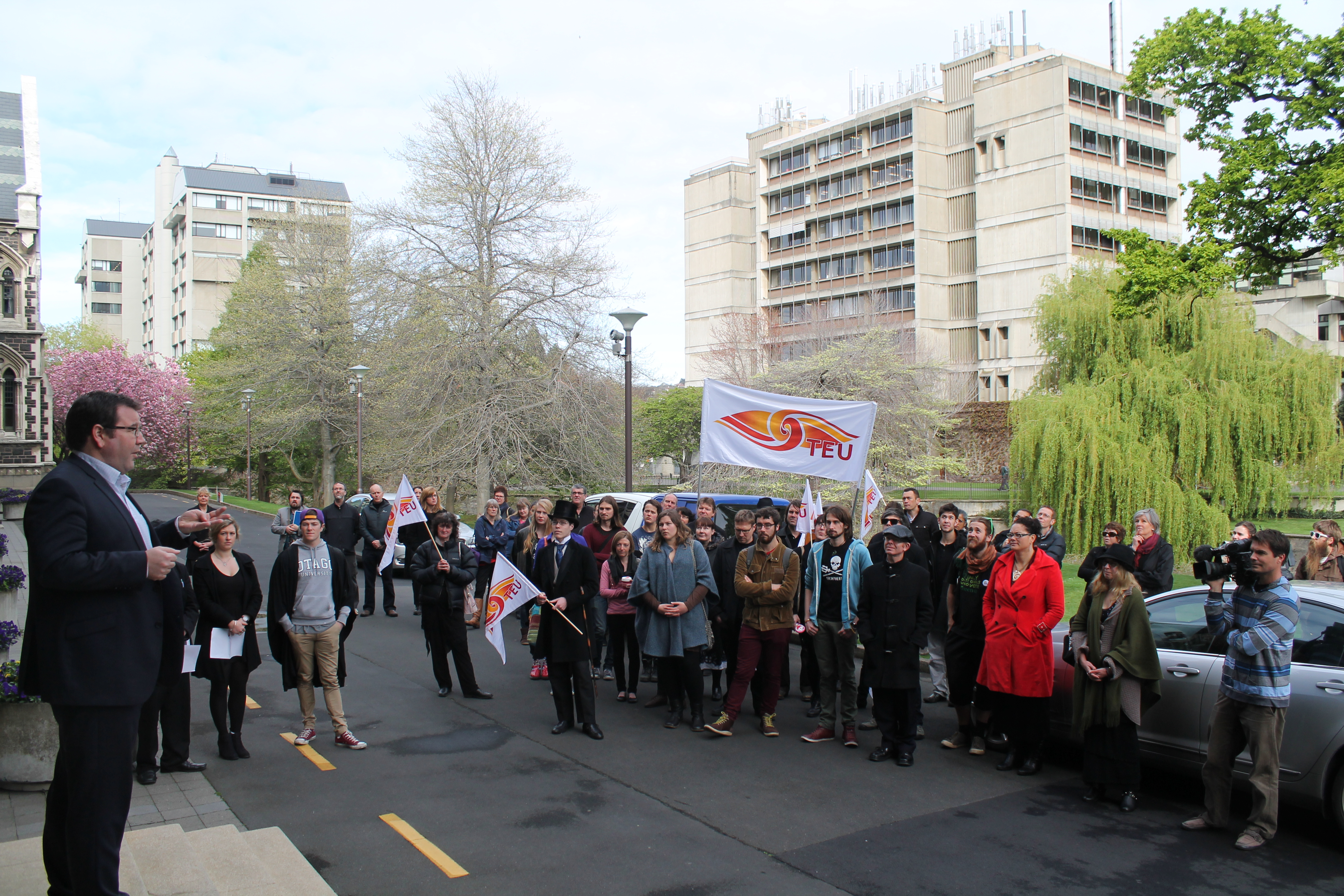
Robertson speaking to a rally opposing the National Government's changes to University Councils, at the University of Otago, October 2013

During the 2011 New Zealand general election, Robertson retained Wellington Central by a margin of 6,376 votes, defeating National's candidate Paul Foster-Bell. Following the 2011 election, which Labour lost, and Annette King's resignation as Labour deputy leader, Robertson was elected by the Labour caucus as the new deputy leader under David Shearer. In Shearer's shadow Cabinet, Robertson also served as spokesperson for employment, skills and training, and arts, culture and heritage.

Following Shearer's resignation from the leadership in 2013, Robertson contested the party-wide leadership election. Although Robertson achieved the plurality support from his colleagues in caucus, David Cunliffe garnered more support from party members and affiliates to win the overall vote. Under Cunliffe's leadership, Robertson was the third-ranked Labour MP and held various portfolios including spokesperson for economic development and shadow Leader of the House.

Throughout 2014, Robertson was critical of National Party minister Judith Collins, after she was accused of having a conflict of interest in regards to her visiting the dairy products company Oravida in China. He repeatedly called for her to resign during the Oravida saga, and when Collins later released information to the media about 1News journalist Katie Bradford, he reiterated his call for her to resign, claiming she had "lost all perspective".

=== Third term, 2014–2017 ===
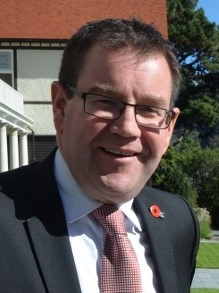
Robertson at Government House, Wellington, in 2015

During the 2014 New Zealand general election, Robertson retained Wellington Central by a margin of 8,267 votes, defeating National's candidate Paul Foster-Bell.

Overall, the Labour Party performed poorly and Cunliffe immediately came under pressure to resign. He was seen by some in the party as taking insufficient blame for the defeat. Media reports suggest that some of the Labour caucus were trying to get Cunliffe to resign so Robertson and Jacinda Ardern could replace the current leadership unopposed. On 26 September, the voting record in the previous leadership race of unions affiliated to Labour was released, showing Cunliffe had won very strong union support in the previous race, and highlighting the challenge for Robertson's bid.

On 28 September, after Cunliffe had signalled his intention to resign, Robertson put his name forward to run for the Labour Party leadership. Robertson pointed to Labour's poor performance in the election as leading him to run: "I couldn't stand by and see the party poll at 24 per cent and not do something now that David's triggered the contest. That's why I've put my name forward." He also argued that the Labour Party needed unity, and he would be a unifying figure, with the support of most of the Labour caucus. Because there were four candidates for the leadership, the Labour Party held a leadership election.

Robertson lost the leadership election to Andrew Little by a small margin, Little receiving 50.52 per cent of the vote to Robertson's 49.48 per cent after the votes from the other unsuccessful candidates had been reallocated. However Robertson once again won the support of most of the caucus, as well as a majority of the membership. After the results were announced, Robertson said he would not seek the Labour Party leadership again in the future.

In Andrew Little's shadow cabinet reshuffle of November 2014, Robertson received the finance portfolio, and was ranked number 3 on the Labour list. Robertson chaired the Labour Party's "Future of Work Commission," a two-year-long policy investigation. The final report was released in 2016.

Robertson said his aims for the portfolio were to cut down on the number of policies, and "humanise" the policy.

=== Fourth term, 2017–2020 ===
During the 2017 New Zealand general election, Robertson retained Wellington Central by a margin of 9,963, defeating National's candidate Nicola Willis.

Following Labour's formation of a coalition government with New Zealand First and the Greens, Robertson was elected as a Cabinet minister by the Labour Party caucus. He was given the key role of finance minister by Prime Minister Jacinda Ardern, along with the portfolios of Minister for Sport and Recreation and associate Minister for Arts, Culture and Heritage.

On 27 June 2019, Robertson was appointed as Minister Responsible for the Earthquake Commission, succeeding Megan Woods.

As finance minister, Robertson was a close confidant of Ardern. During the New Zealand government's COVID-19 response, Robertson would sometimes deputise for Ardern at her daily press conferences. Their close working relationship led some commentators to describe him as her "de facto political deputy," over Labour Party deputy leader Kelvin Davis.

=== Fifth term, 2020–2023 ===
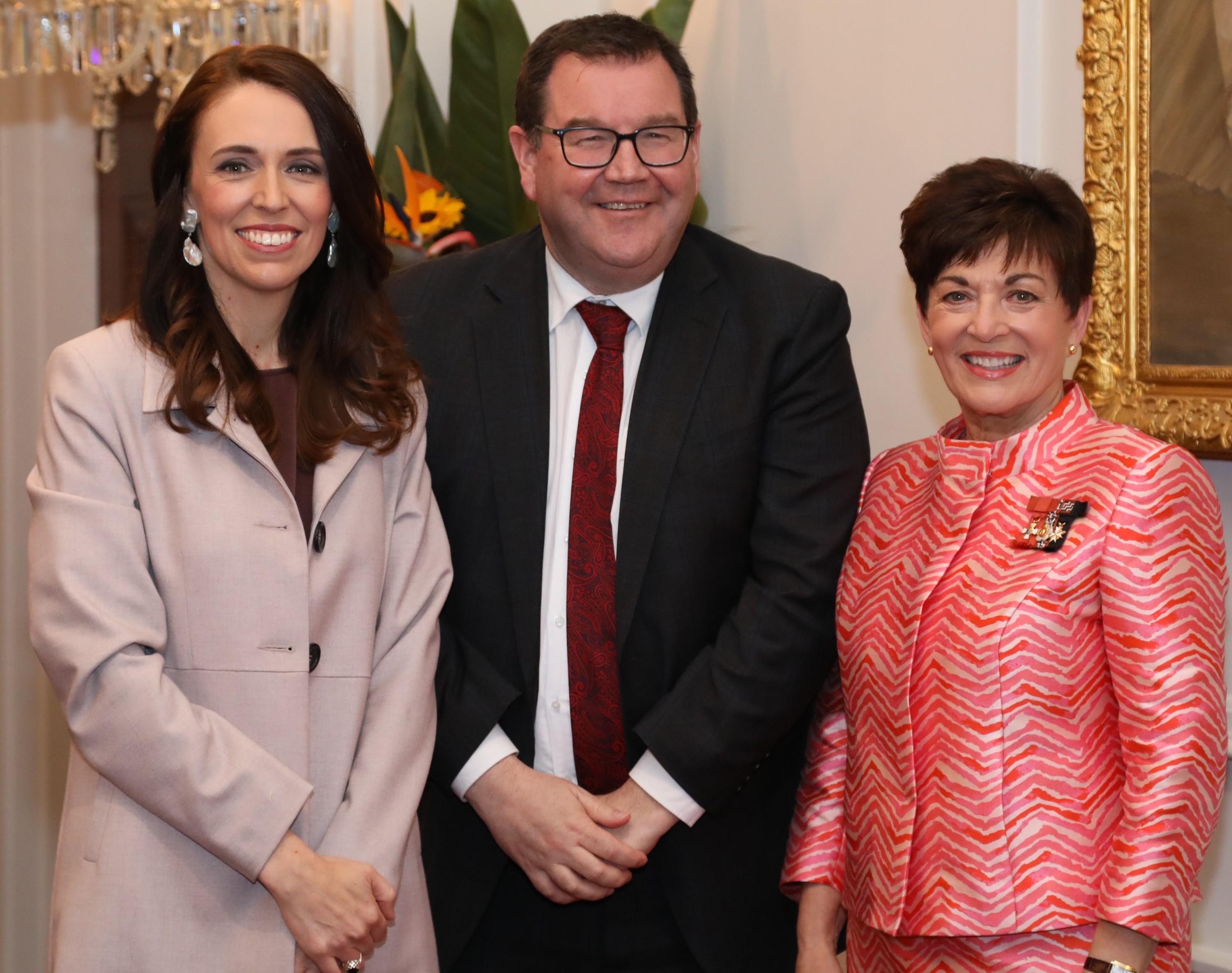
Robertson flanked by Prime Minister Ardern and Governor-General Dame Patsy Reddy in November 2020

During the 2020 New Zealand general election, Robertson retained Wellington Central by a margin of 18,878, defeating National's candidate Nicola Willis. Labour won a landslide victory during that election, winning 54.3% of the party vote.

He was eventually appointed Deputy Prime Minister after the 2020 election when deputy party leader Kelvin Davis declined the position. Robertson also retained his portfolios as minister of finance and minister for sport & recreation, and added the ministerial portfolios for infrastructure and racing.

In mid-February 2021, Robertson pulled out of his weekly interview slots with Peter Williams' Magic Talk radio show after Williams questioned him about his views on the implications of the World Economic Forum's Great Reset for New Zealand. Robertson reportedly stated that he would no longer appear on the show since he did not want to "shoot down conspiracy theories."

In December 2022 commentator Morgan Godfrery lauded his handling of the finance portfolio.

Prime Minister Jacinda Ardern announced her resignation on 19 January 2023. Robertson immediately responded that he would not be seeking election as her successor but that he would contest the 2023 general election. He also stood down as deputy prime minister, but continued as finance minister and also became Leader of the House and, after Cyclone Gabrielle struck parts of New Zealand, Minister for Cyclone Recovery. He was briefly Minister of Foreign Affairs in November 2023 after incumbent Nanaia Mahuta lost her re-election bid.

=== Sixth term, 2023–2024 ===
During the 2023 New Zealand general election, Robertson declined to contest Wellington Central and opted to run as a list-only candidate. He was subsequently re-elected as a list MP.

On 30 November 2023, Robertson became speaker for finance and racing in the Shadow Cabinet of Chris Hipkins.

On 5 December 2023, Robertson was granted retention of the title The Honourable, in recognition of his term as a member of the Executive Council.

On 20 February 2024 Robertson announced he was retiring from politics in March to take up a new job as Vice-Chancellor of the University of Otago, commencing 1 July 2024. His resignation led to a reshuffle in Hipkins' shadow cabinet, with Barbara Edmonds assuming Robertson's finance portfolio. Glen Bennett also entered Parliament on the Labour Party list.

== As vice-chancellor of the University of Otago ==
Robertson assumed the role of Vice-chancellor of the University of Otago during a welcoming ceremony on 1 July 2024. Following news of his appointment, university chancellor Stephen Higgs said it was unanimously supported by the university council. His appointment received a mixed reception from donors. While some were supportive, several objected to appointing a former politician due to his non-academic background and record as Finance Minister. Several alumni withheld donations and funding to Otago University as a result of Robertson's appointment as Vice-Chancellor.

In November 2024, Robertson announced that he would personally be funding seven scholarships, worth NZ$7,000 annually, as a supplement to first-year Otago students, who had been awarded an Otago equity scholarship and qualify for financial support. In mid-August 2025, Robertson apologised for not properly informing staff and students about planned cutbacks to the university's doctoral scholarships programme, which affected the July and November scholarship application rounds.

In early March 2026, Robertson confirmed that the University of Otago would establish a new campus in Queenstown. The university would begin offering an undergraduate degree in entrepreneurship and a postgraduate qualification in digital technology, with plans to roll out further courses. The university also plans to build a student accommodation for 500 students by 2030.

== Personal life ==
Robertson lives in the suburb of Northland, in Wellington City, with his partner Alf Kaiwai, whom he met through playing rugby together for the Wellington-based Krazy Knights, New Zealand's first gay rugby team. After 10 years in a relationship, they held a civil union ceremony in January 2009. Alf had worked for Treasury, then became a bus driver.

Robertson was among New Zealand's first prominent gay politicians, and drew media focus as the country's first openly gay deputy prime minister. In his maiden statement, given on 9 December 2008, Robertson alluded to his sexuality as a part, but not the whole, of his identity:

I am proud and comfortable with who I am. Being gay is part of who I am, just as is being a former diplomat, a fan of the mighty ... Wellington Lions, and a fan of New Zealand music and New Zealand literature. My political view is defined by my sexuality only inasmuch as it has given me an insight into how people can be marginalised and discriminated against, and how much I abhor that. I am lucky that I have largely grown up in a generation that is not fixated on issues such as sexual orientation. I am not—and neither should others be.

In a 2012 interview with Guyon Espiner, he hit out at the suggestion that being gay could prevent him from understanding the concerns of ordinary New Zealanders:

That’s one of the things that irritates me the most. How can you say that? That someone won’t understand New Zealanders because they’re gay. I understand all sorts of things about being a New Zealander. I understand what happens when your dad goes to prison. I understand what it’s like when the All Blacks lose. You know? I understand what it’s like when you’re trying to work out if you’ve got enough money to do [renovation] to the house? It’s bullshit.

== Bibliography ==
- Robertson, Grant (2025). Anything Could Happen: A Memoir. Auckland: Allen and Unwin. ISBN 978-1-99100-687-5.

New Zealand Parliament
Preceded by Marian Hobbs	Member of Parliament for Wellington Central; 2008–2023	Succeeded by Tamatha Paul
Political offices
Preceded by Annette King	Deputy Leader of the Opposition; 2011–2013	Succeeded by David Parker
Preceded by Steven Joyce	Minister of Finance; 2017–2023	Succeeded by Nicola Willis
Preceded by Jonathan Coleman	Minister for Sport and Recreation; 2017–2023	Succeeded by Chris Bishop
Preceded by Megan Woods	Minister Responsible for the Earthquake Commission; 2019–2020	Succeeded by David Clark
Preceded by Winston Peters	Deputy Prime Minister of New Zealand; 2020–2023	Succeeded by Carmel Sepuloni
Preceded by Shane Jones	Minister for Infrastructure; 2020–2023	Succeeded by Megan Woods
Preceded by Winston Peters	Minister for Racing; 2020–2022	Succeeded by Kieran McAnulty
Preceded by Chris Hipkins	Leader of the House; 2023	Succeeded by Chris Bishop
Preceded by Nanaia Mahuta	Minister of Foreign Affairs; 2023	Succeeded by Winston Peters
Preceded by Nanaia Mahuta	Minister of Disarmament and Arms Control; 2023	Vacant
Party political offices
Preceded by Annette King	Deputy Leader of the Labour Party; 2011–2013	Succeeded by David Parker
