= Deputy Leader of the New Zealand Labour Party =

Political party leader

Deputy Leader of the Labour Party
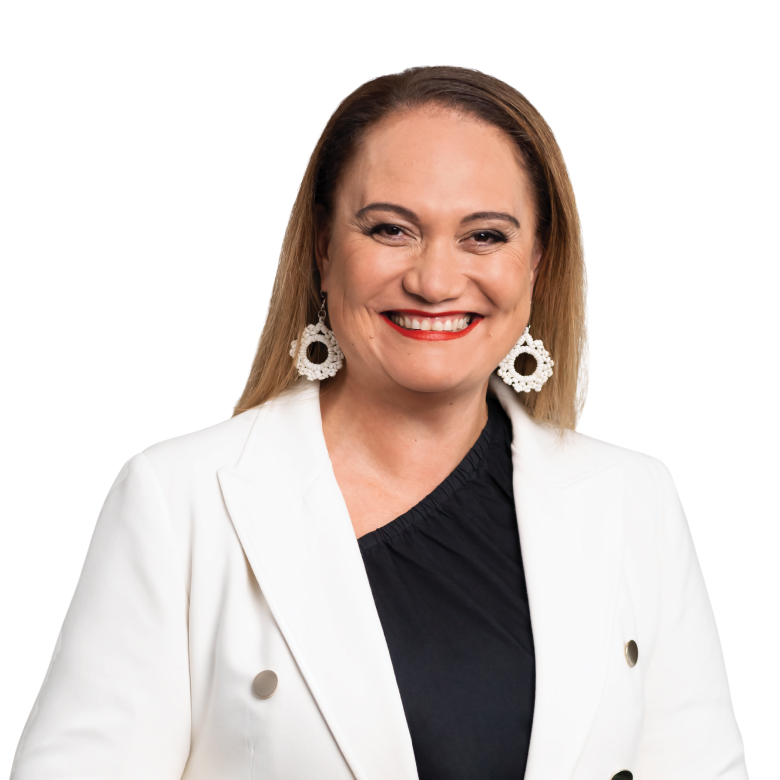
- Incumbent; Carmel Sepuloni since 7 November 2023
- Term length: No fixed term
- Inaugural holder: James McCombs
- Formation: 27 August 1919

The deputy leader of the Labour Party is the second-most senior politician within the Labour Party in New Zealand. The officeholder deputises for the leader of the Labour Party at party-specific events. Unlike other political party leaders, the Labour Party's leader does not have the power to dismiss or appoint their deputy; both the leader and deputy are elected. In all cases where the leadership is vacant, the deputy leader shall also serve as acting leader until a new leadership election. When the Labour Party forms the Official Opposition the deputy leader typically serves as deputy leader of the Opposition.

Carmel Sepuloni is the current Deputy Leader, elected on 7 November 2023.

== History ==
The position of deputy leader of the New Zealand Labour Party was created in 1919, three years after the party's creation. The first holder, James McCombs, was bestowed the role after he lost the draw of lots to Harry Holland in the leadership election that year. It was not until 1974 that the party elected its first deputy to have been born in New Zealand, Bob Tizard. Prior to this, three deputy leaders had been born in Australia, two in England and one each in Ireland and Scotland. The Labour Party's longest-serving deputy leader, having served for 11 years, 4 months and 12 days between 1963 and 1974, was Hugh Watt.

To date, a total of seven deputy leaders have gone on to become the elected leader of the Labour Party (Savage, Fraser, Nash, Lange, Palmer, Clark and Ardern). Two deputy leaders have died in office (Skinner and Hackett).

== List of deputy leaders ==
The following is a complete list of Labour Party deputy leaders. Some deputies served concurrently as acting party leader.

No.	Leader (Birth–Death)	Portrait	Electorate	Term of Office		Leader
1	James McCombs (1873–1933)		Lyttelton	27 August 1919	7 February 1923	Holland
2	Michael Joseph Savage (1872–1940)		Auckland West	7 February 1923	12 October 1933	Holland
3	Peter Fraser (1884–1950)		Wellington Central	12 October 1933	1 April 1940	Savage
4	Walter Nash (1882–1968)		Hutt	1 April 1940	17 January 1951	Fraser
5	Jerry Skinner (1900–1962)		Buller	17 January 1951	26 April 1962†	Nash
6	Fred Hackett (1901–1963)		Grey Lynn	7 June 1962	19 March 1963†	Nash
7	Hugh Watt (1912–1980)		Onehunga	29 April 1963	6 September 1974	Nordmeyer
7	Hugh Watt (1912–1980)		Onehunga	29 April 1963	6 September 1974	Kirk
8	Bob Tizard (1924–2016)		Otahuhu	10 September 1974	1 November 1979	Rowling
9	David Lange (1942–2005)		Mangere	1 November 1979	3 February 1983	Rowling
10	Geoffrey Palmer (1942–)		Christchurch Central	3 February 1983	8 August 1989	Lange
11	Helen Clark (1950–)		Mount Albert	8 August 1989	1 December 1993	Palmer
11	Helen Clark (1950–)		Mount Albert	8 August 1989	1 December 1993	Moore
12	David Caygill (1948–)		St Albans	1 December 1993	11 June 1996	Clark
13	Michael Cullen (1945–2021)		Dunedin South	11 June 1996	11 November 2008	Clark
14	Annette King (1947–)		Rongotai	11 November 2008	13 December 2011	Goff
15	Grant Robertson (1971–)		Wellington Central	13 December 2011	15 September 2013	Shearer
16	David Parker (1960–)		List	15 September 2013	18 November 2014	Cunliffe
(14)	Annette King (1947–)		Rongotai	18 November 2014	7 March 2017	Little
17	Jacinda Ardern (1980–)		Mount Albert	7 March 2017	1 August 2017	Little
18	Kelvin Davis (1967–)		Te Tai Tokerau	1 August 2017	7 November 2023	Ardern
18	Kelvin Davis (1967–)		Te Tai Tokerau	1 August 2017	7 November 2023	Hipkins
19	Carmel Sepuloni (1977–)		Kelston	7 November 2023	Incumbent	Hipkins
