= David Cunliffe =

New Zealand politician

The Honourable David Cunliffe QSO
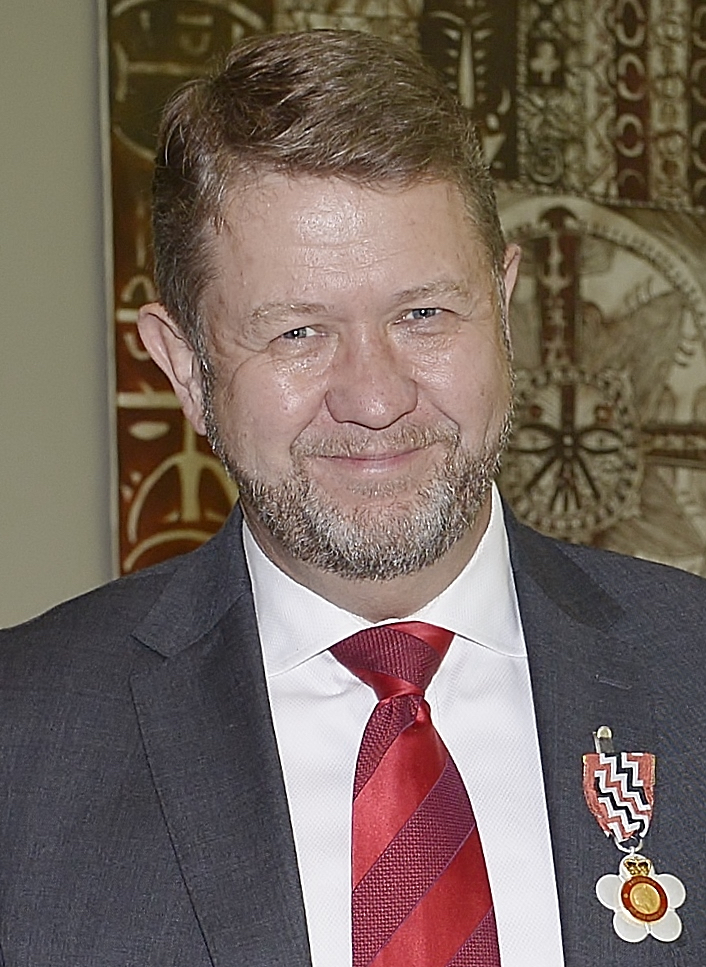
- Cunliffe in 2018

34th Leader of the Opposition
- In office 15 September 2013 – 27 September 2014
- Prime Minister: John Key
- Deputy: David Parker
- Preceded by: David Shearer
- Succeeded by: Andrew Little (Note: David Parker acted from 30 September to 18 November 2014.)

15th Leader of the Labour Party
- In office 15 September 2013 – 27 September 2014
- Deputy: David Parker
- Preceded by: David Shearer
- Succeeded by: Andrew Little (Note: David Parker acted from 30 September to 18 November 2014.)

37th Minister of Health
- In office 31 October 2007 – 19 November 2008
- Prime Minister: Helen Clark
- Preceded by: Pete Hodgson
- Succeeded by: Tony Ryall

51st Minister of Immigration
- In office 19 October 2005 – 11 November 2007
- Prime Minister: Helen Clark
- Preceded by: Paul Swain
- Succeeded by: Clayton Cosgrove

Minister of Communications and Information Technology
- In office 15 August 2002 – 19 November 2008
- Prime Minister: Helen Clark
- Preceded by: Paul Swain
- Succeeded by: Steven Joyce

Member of Parliament for New Lynn Titirangi (1999–2002)
- In office 27 November 1999 – 23 April 2017
- Preceded by: Electorate re-established
- Succeeded by: Deborah Russell

Personal details
- Born: David Richard Cunliffe; 30 April 1963 (age 63) Te Aroha, New Zealand
- Party: Labour
- Spouse: Karen Price (1984–2015)
- Relations: Richard Seddon (great-great uncle)
- Children: 2
- Education: University of Otago; Massey University; Harvard University

David Richard Cunliffe QSO (born 30 April 1963) is a New Zealand management consultant and former politician who was Leader of the New Zealand Labour Party and Leader of the Opposition from September 2013 to September 2014. He was Member of Parliament (MP) for Titirangi and then New Lynn for the Labour Party between 1999 and 2017. He served as the Minister of Health, Minister for Communications and Information Technology and Minister of Immigration for the Fifth Labour Government of New Zealand from October 2007 until November 2008.

After the defeat of the Labour Party in the 2008 general election, and the resignation of Helen Clark as the party leader, Cunliffe was appointed the party's finance spokesman and number three on the front bench. After Labour lost the 2011 general election and Phil Goff stood down as party leader, Cunliffe ran for the leadership, but narrowly lost to David Shearer.

On 26 August 2013, Cunliffe announced a second leadership bid after David Shearer's departure from the leadership and was elected on 15 September 2013. Following Labour's defeat at the general election in September 2014, he resigned as leader of the Labour Party.

== Early life ==
Cunliffe was born in Te Aroha on 30 April 1963. His family moved to Te Kūiti, then to Pleasant Point. His father, Bill, an Anglican minister, was active in the Labour Party. As a teenager he won a scholarship to study the International Baccalaureate at the United World College of the Atlantic in Wales. Cunliffe studied politics at the University of Otago, where he was a member of the Otago University Debating Society, and gained a BA with first-class honours. He worked as a diplomat from 1987 to 1994 and gained a Diploma in Social Sciences (Distinction) in economics from Massey University in 1993. He was a Fulbright Scholar and Kennedy Memorial Fellow at Harvard University’s John F. Kennedy School of Government, including some courses at Harvard Business and Law School in 1994 and 1995, earning a Master of Public Administration. He worked as a management consultant with The Boston Consulting Group in Auckland from 1995 to 1999.

== Member of Parliament ==
New Zealand Parliament
Years	Term	Electorate	List	Party
1999–2002	46th	Titirangi	52	Labour
2002–2005	47th	New Lynn	37	Labour
2005–2008	48th	New Lynn	31	Labour
2008–2011	49th	New Lynn	8	Labour
2011–2014	50th	New Lynn	3	Labour
2014–2017	51st	New Lynn	1	Labour

Cunliffe was first elected to Parliament in the 1999 election, standing as the Labour candidate for the Titirangi seat. Labour formed a new Government and Cunliffe served as Chair of the Commerce Select Committee and sat on the Finance and Expenditure and Regulations Review select committees.

Due to boundary changes for the 2002 election Cunliffe contested the seat of New Lynn, which he won. Cunliffe's party continued in Government for its second term and he was made a Parliamentary Private Secretary to the Ministers of Commerce, Finance and Revenue before being elevated to the Executive Council as a Minister outside of Cabinet in 2003. At the 2005 election, Cunliffe was returned in New Lynn with 18,087 votes (8,000 more than his nearest opponent) or 55% of the electorate vote, and also promoted into Cabinet.

Cunliffe retained his seat in the 2008, 2011, and 2014 elections, during which the Labour Party was in Opposition. He served various senior roles, including as Finance Spokesperson, but was regarded as "a destabilising force" undermining the leadership of Labour Party leaders Phil Goff and David Shearer. Cunliffe was eventually elected as Labour Party Leader and Leader of the Opposition for twelve months in 2013 and 2014, including at the 2014 general election where the party received its worst result in 100 years.

Cunliffe's intention to retire from politics was announced by his successor, Andrew Little, on 1 November 2016. Cunliffe officially resigned from Parliament in April 2017, near enough to the 2017 election to avoid the need for a by-election.

=== Cabinet minister (2005–2008) ===
Cunliffe was appointed to the Cabinet of New Zealand in 2005 for the third term of the Fifth Labour Government, initially as the Minister of Immigration, Minister of Communications, Minister for Information Technology, and Associate Minister for Economic Development. He had previously held the Communications and Information Technology portfolios outside of Cabinet. A Cabinet reshuffle in 2007 saw him lose the Immigration portfolio in exchange for the more senior position as Minister of Health.

==== Immigration ====
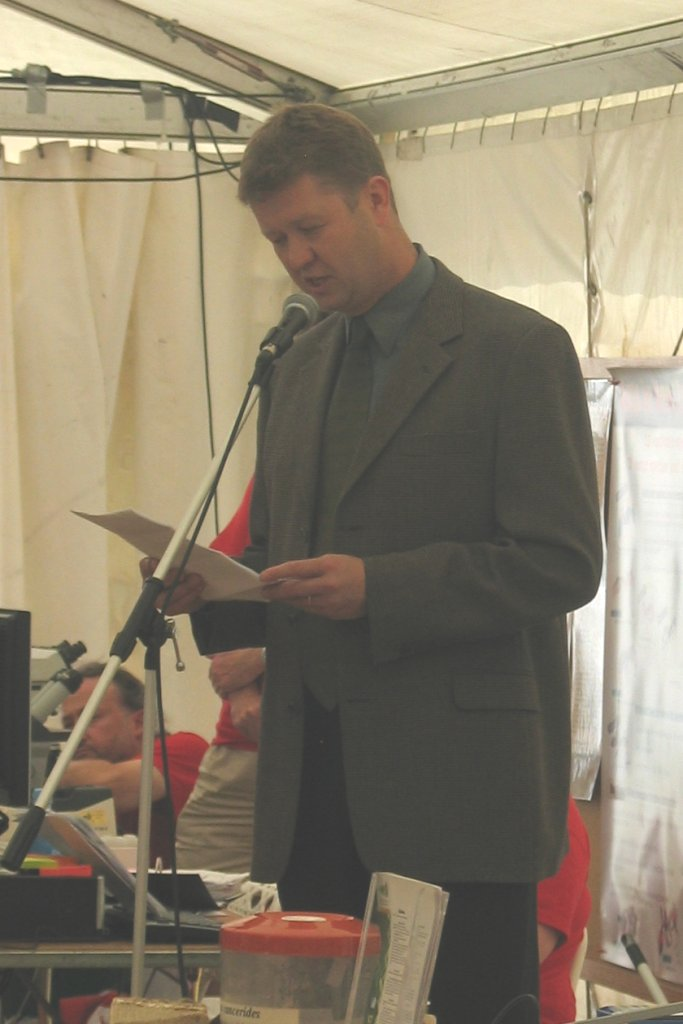
Cunliffe closing the 2005 Auckland BioBlitz

As Immigration Minister in 2006, Cunliffe initiated a major review of the Immigration Act 1987 which, under the oversight of his successors, resulted in the eventual replacement of that Act with the new Immigration Act 2009.

==== Communications and Information Technology ====
Cunliffe served as an Associate Minister for Communications and Associate Minister for Information Technology from 2003 before being promoted to the primary portfolios in 2004. The two portfolios were merged into a single ministerial role in 2007.

As Minister for Communications and Information Technology he announced extensive pro-competitive reform of the telecommunications sector, including local loop unbundling and operational separation of then Telecom New Zealand.

In May 2006 Cunliffe was referred to the Securities Commission by the NZX for commenting on Telecom's future dividend plans, causing Telecom's stock price to drop. The Securities Commission found that no law had been breached and no action was taken.

On 30 June 2008 Cunliffe was conferred the title of Honorary Fellow of the NZCS (HFNZCS) by the New Zealand Computer Society, the professional body of the ICT profession in recognition of his significant contribution to the ICT sector.

==== Health ====
Cunliffe was promoted to the Health portfolio in 2007, replacing Pete Hodgson. He received some attention when, early in the portfolio, he said to his opposition counterpart Tony Ryall, "Mr Ryall, why don't you stay in your box. I'm running this show."

In February 2008, as the Minister of Health, Cunliffe dismissed the Hawke's Bay District Health Board over political, monetary and conflict of interest troubles. Napier Mayor Barbara Arnott and a number of members of the district voiced opposition to Cunliffe's move as many of the board members were democratically elected. Following the release of a Health Ministry-commissioned independent report into the matter, Cunliffe referred to the board as a "nasty little nest of self-perpetuating provincial elites".

=== In Opposition (2008–2013) ===
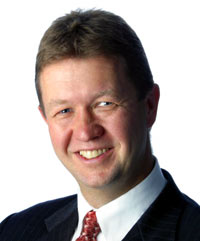
Official portrait, 2008

After the 2008 general election defeat of the Labour Party, Cunliffe was made Labour's spokesman for finance, shadowing National's Finance Minister, Bill English. Cunliffe had been touted as a future leader of the party, and party insiders had suggested he seriously considered challenging Phil Goff as leader in the aftermath of the 2008 election. Speculation of a leadership challenge again arose during the June 2010 expenses scandal and again after Chris Carter's resignation from the party.

After Labour lost the 2011 general election and Goff stood down, Cunliffe ran for the party leadership with Nanaia Mahuta on a ticket for deputy leader. Grant Robertson and David Parker also entered the race, but subsequently backed David Shearer, who won the high-profile race. Robertson became deputy leader, while Parker took Cunliffe's finance spokesmanship. Shearer retained Cunliffe in a senior role on the front bench, with the economic development and associate finance roles.

In November 2012 during a Labour Party conference, there was much media speculation Cunliffe would launch a challenge against David Shearer for leadership of the party. On the morning of 19 November, Cunliffe confirmed he was not challenging Shearer, and would indeed back him if a vote was taken. However, Cunliffe was accused of demonstrating disloyalty and subsequently stripped of his front bench position and his portfolios.

==== Labour Party leadership contest, 2013 ====
On 22 August 2013, Shearer announced his resignation as leader of the Labour Party. Cunliffe was expected to make another bid for the leadership but did not confirm his candidacy immediately. Victoria University of Wellington's iPredict online predictions market showed the probability of Cunliffe becoming the next leader of the Labour Party at 66%, compared to under 26% support for Shearer's deputy Grant Robertson; social development spokesperson Jacinda Ardern polled at 5%, and list MP Andrew Little was on 2%.

Cunliffe formally entered the 2013 New Zealand Labour Party leadership election during a press conference in his New Lynn electorate office. His announcement came in the wake of a ONE News Colmar Brunton poll released by the current affair programme Q+A which showed Cunliffe winning the support of 29% of the eligible voters asked, and 32% of those polled who support Labour. Challengers Shane Jones and Grant Robertson were on 11% and 10%, respectively. After the first public Labour Party leadership selection process in New Zealand history, Cunliffe was elected leader on 15 September 2013. He won with the support of 32% of the Labour Party caucus, 60% of Labour Party members, and 70% of affiliated unions.

=== Leader of the Opposition (2013–2014) ===
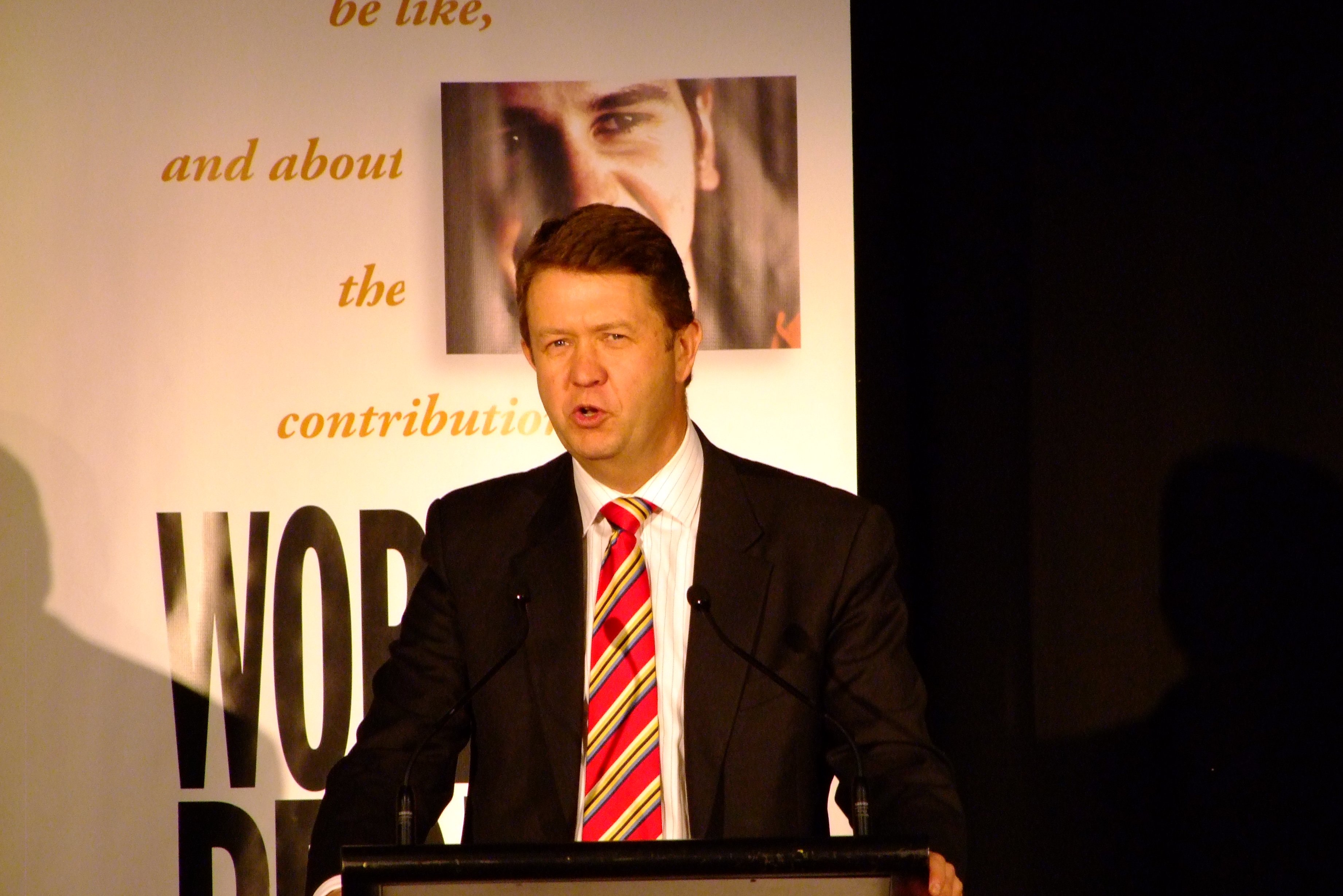
Cunliffe addressing the CTU Conference in October 2013

Cunliffe received strong backing from the party's grassroots membership, although his leadership bid was supported by only one-third of the caucus. Cunliffe's leadership was opposed by many Labour MPs; several of his colleagues came to see him as "divisive, ambitious, self-absorbed and self-confident to a messianic level". He was described as a "polarising" politician, but his election as leader resulted in an initial increase in support for Labour; it rose to 37% in opinion polls.

In a speech to a Women's Refuge symposium in July 2014, Cunliffe stated, "I am sorry for being a man". He was commenting on domestic violence against women by men. His apology was regarded as insensitive, with Prime Minister John Key criticising the remark as "a bit insulting to imply that all men are abusive".

With little time to make the structural changes needed to build a proper campaign and a party marked by continued infighting, Labour performed poorly in the public opinion polls during the run-up to the 2014 general election. It was, as Cunliffe was to say later, "the craziest and in some ways the most unfortunate campaign in recorded memory".

==== 2014 general election ====
Labour formally launched its campaign for 2014 general election in Auckland on 21 July. Cunliffe announced several flagship election policies, including a promise of free GP visits and prescriptions to pregnant women and those aged under 13 and over 65. In a speech he stated, "We are basing our policies on a very old idea. That your healthcare is based on your health need, not on the size of your wallet." He was criticised for taking a three-day skiing holiday in Queenstown at the start of the campaign.

His performance in the leadership debates was viewed as mixed. Key claimed a win in the 2 September The Press leaders' debate after Cunliffe could not answer whether family homes held in a trust would be exempt under Labour's capital gains tax policy, but then went on to recover in the second and third debates.

Cunliffe's Labour Party received 25.1% of the party vote and 32 seats, its lowest share of the vote since 1922, while the National Party gained a plurality with 47.0% of the party vote, its best result since 1951. Cunliffe initially vowed to remain as the party leader, in spite of the poor election result. On 27 September Cunliffe formally resigned as leader but announced he was re-contesting in the 2014 party leadership election. On 13 October, he announced he was pulling out of the leadership race.

=== Political views ===
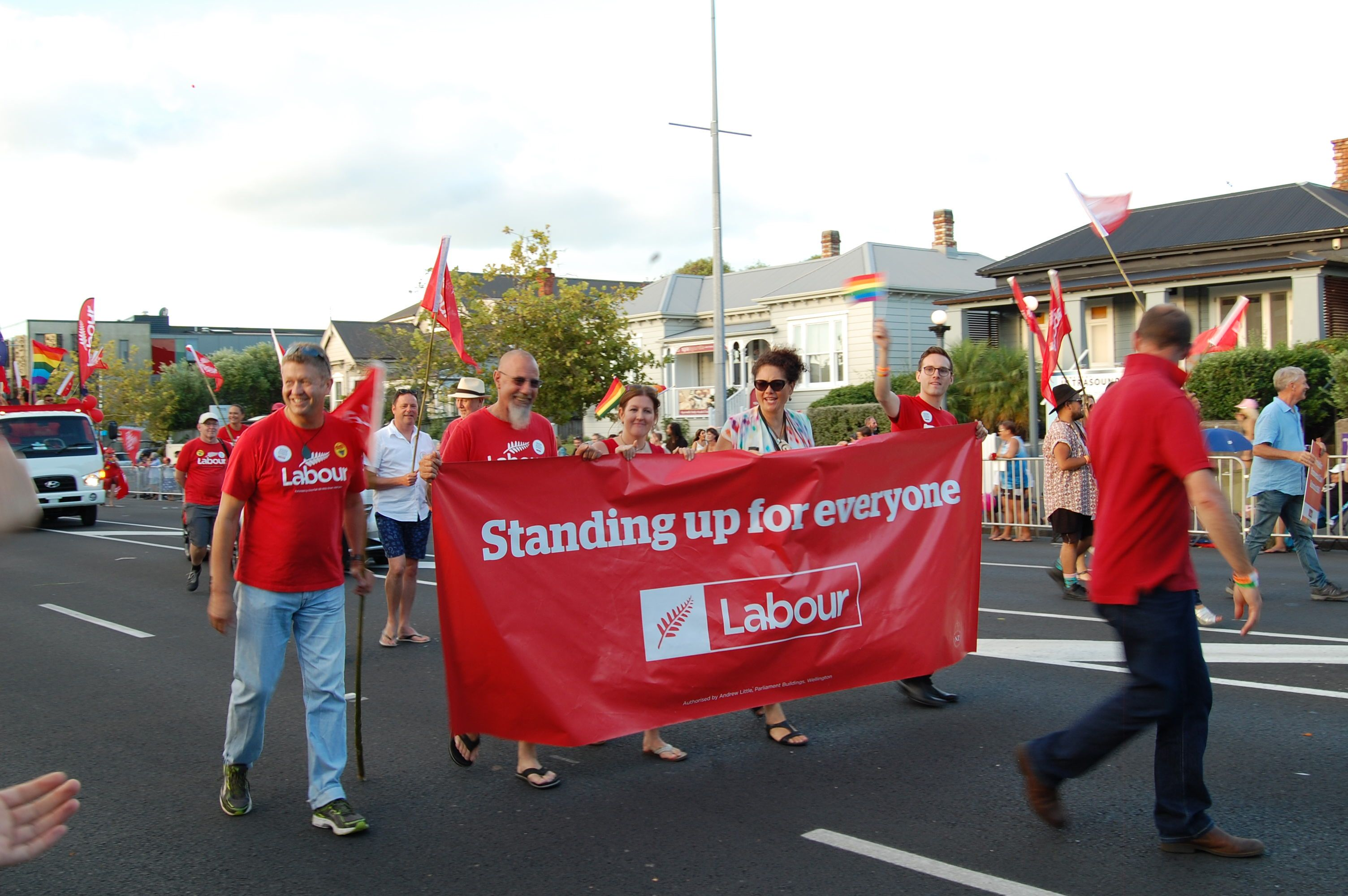
Cunliffe marching with Labour members in a parade at the Auckland Pride Festival, February 2016

Cunliffe is generally liberal when it comes to conscience issues. He voted in favour of the decriminalisation of prostitution, the establishment of civil unions, and the criminalisation of parental corporal punishment. He voted against defining marriage as between one man and one woman, and in 2013, he voted in favour of legalising same-sex marriage. In 2006, he voted in favour of raising the legal drinking age from 18 to 20, but voted against it in 2012.

Cunliffe has expressed a view that New Zealand will become a republic in the future. During a debate after the speech from the throne on 4 September 2002, Cunliffe spoke of "Building a New Zealand ... where we journey together towards maturity as a nation, and to the Commonwealth republic I personally believe we will become before the Treaty turns 200".

== Life after politics ==
Following his retirement from Parliament on 21 April 2017, Cunliffe joined the New Zealand-based management consultancy firm Stakeholder Strategies as a partner, working for a range of public and private sector clients. He left the company in 2020. Since 2020 he has been a director of the Polis Consulting Group.

In the 2018 New Year Honours, Cunliffe was appointed a Companion of the Queen's Service Order, for services as a member of Parliament.

In February 2020, Cunliffe was also appointed as chair of the Selwyn Foundation, one of New Zealand's largest independent charitable providers of services to older people and their families.

In December 2025, Associate Health Minister Casey Costello appointed Cunliffe as chair of the ten-member Aged Care Ministerial Advisory Group.

== Personal life ==
=== Family ===
Cunliffe's domestic partner is Anna Kominik. Kominik is the independent chair of the Electricity Retailers’ Association and the New Zealand Director of Zephyr Airworks. He has two sons from his previous marriage to Auckland lawyer Karen Price. Cunliffe's father Bill was born in Ngahere in 1915 and worked at the railways. His great-grandfather, William Cunliffe, married Phoebe Seddon, the elder sister of Richard Seddon, who would later become known as 'King Dick'. Seddon, New Zealand's longest serving prime minister, was thus Cunliffe's great-(great-)uncle.

=== Religious views ===
Cunliffe is the son of an Anglican minister, and was raised in the Church of England. He has described himself as a "liberal Anglican," and an "infrequent attender of church, but it's a big part of my life."

== See also ==
- Shadow Cabinet of David Cunliffe

== Notes ==
New Zealand Parliament
New constituency	Member of Parliament for Titirangi; 1999–2002	Constituency abolished
New constituency	Member of Parliament for New Lynn; 2002–2017	Succeeded by Deborah Russell
Political offices
Preceded by Pete Hodgson	Minister of Health; 2007–2008	Succeeded by Tony Ryall
Preceded by Bill English	Shadow Minister of Finance; 2008–2011	Succeeded by David Parker
Preceded by David Shearer	Leader of the Opposition; 2013–2014	Succeeded by Andrew Little
Party political offices
Preceded by David Shearer	Leader of the Labour Party; 2013–2014	Succeeded by Andrew Little
