= David Shearer =

New Zealand politician

David Shearer MBE
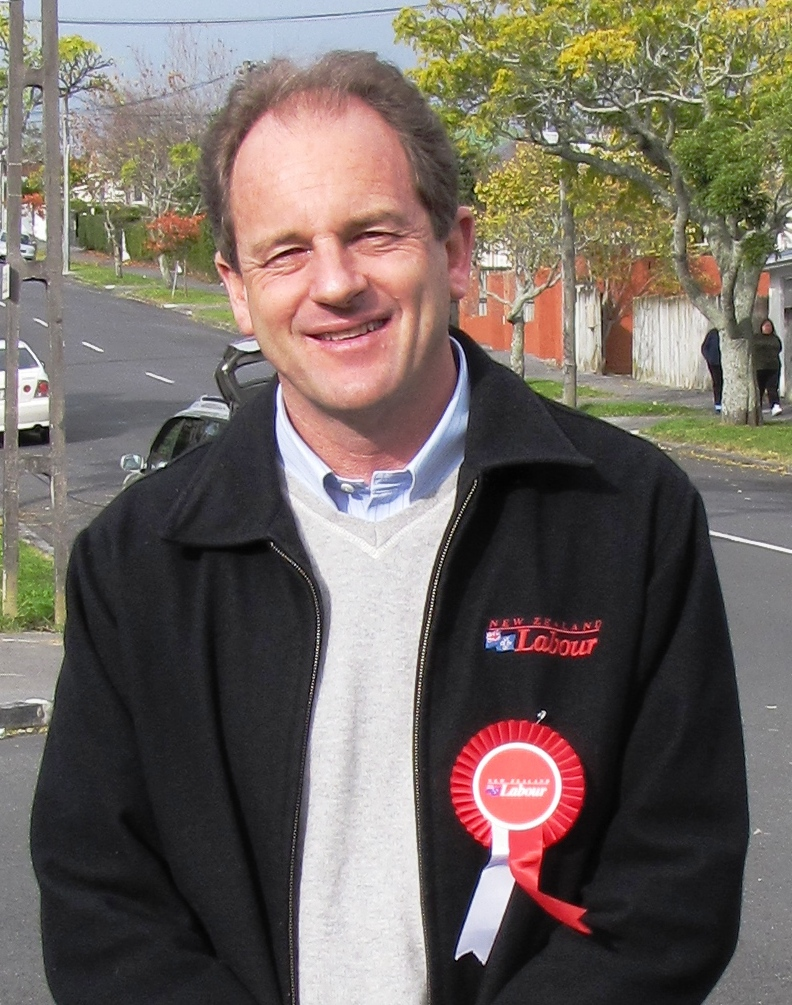
- Shearer in the Mount Albert electorate, May 2009

Special Representative of the Secretary-General for South Sudan
- In office 1 January 2017 – 15 January 2021
- Secretary-General: António Guterres
- Preceded by: Ellen Margrethe Løj
- Succeeded by: Nicholas Haysom

33rd Leader of the Opposition
- In office 13 December 2011 – 15 September 2013
- Prime Minister: John Key
- Deputy: Grant Robertson
- Preceded by: Phil Goff
- Succeeded by: David Cunliffe

14th Leader of the Labour Party
- In office 13 December 2011 – 15 September 2013
- Deputy: Grant Robertson
- Preceded by: Phil Goff
- Succeeded by: David Cunliffe

Member of the New Zealand Parliament for Mount Albert
- In office 13 June 2009 – 31 December 2016
- Preceded by: Helen Clark
- Succeeded by: Jacinda Ardern

Personal details
- Born: David James Shearer; 28 July 1957 (age 69) Auckland, New Zealand
- Party: Labour
- Spouse: Anuschka Meyer
- Children: 2
- Education: University of Auckland; University of Canterbury
- Occupation: Politician, humanitarian worker

David James Shearer MBE (born 28 July 1957) is a New Zealand United Nations worker and politician. He was a member of the New Zealand Parliament for the Labour Party from 2009 to 2016, serving as Leader of the Opposition from 2011 to 2013.

Shearer spent nearly 20 years working for the UN, managing the provision of aid to countries including Somalia, Rwanda, Liberia, Kosovo, Afghanistan, Lebanon and Iraq. In 1992, Shearer was (together with his wife) named as New Zealander of the Year by The New Zealand Herald. On 13 June 2009 he won the Mount Albert by-election and entered the House of Representatives. He was elected as leader of the Labour Party on 13 December 2011 but resigned on 15 September 2013, being succeeded by David Cunliffe.

Shearer resigned from Parliament in December 2016 and in 2017 was appointed to head the United Nations peace keeping mission in South Sudan. In January 2021, he was succeeded in the role by Nicholas Haysom.

== Early life ==
Shearer was born and brought up in the Auckland suburb of Papatoetoe. He was the eldest of three children in a family of schoolteachers. His father being a Presbyterian elder, he was a church-goer in his youth. He attended Papatoetoe High School, where he was head boy and Phil Goff was a friend. He graduated from the University of Auckland with a BSc and the University of Canterbury with a MSc (Hons) in Resource Management. From 1983 to 1987 he was a teacher at Massey High School and Onehunga High School.

== Public service and non-government organisation career ==
Shearer has conducted various assignments with the International Institute for Strategic Studies, the Save the Children Fund, and the International Crisis Group, and is the author of numerous publications in the areas of humanitarian affairs and conflict resolution.

Between 1987 and 1989 he was a consultant for the Tainui Trust Board assisting with the preparation of its land claims to the Waitangi Tribunal. In 1989 he was appointed as UN Co-ordinator for Humanitarian Operations in Africa and the Balkans and served as head of the Save the Children Fund in Rwanda, Somalia, Northern Iraq and Sri Lanka. In 1995 he served as the Senior Humanitarian Affairs Adviser in Liberia. From 1999 Shearer served in various UN posts including Deputy Humanitarian Coordinator for the United Nations in Rwanda, Senior Humanitarian Adviser in Albania and Chief of the United Nations Office for the Coordination of Humanitarian Affairs in Belgrade. Shearer left the United Nations to work as an adviser to the Minister for Foreign Affairs and Trade, Phil Goff for two years.

In 2002 Shearer returned to the United Nations, serving as a Senior Adviser to the United Nations Assistance Mission in Afghanistan. In February 2003 Shearer was appointed head of the United Nations Office for the Coordination of Humanitarian Affairs in Jerusalem. During the conflict in Lebanon in 2006 he served as the Humanitarian Coordinator organising assistance for civilians caught up in the conflict between Israel and Lebanon.

In 2007 Shearer was appointed by the United Nations Secretary-General Ban Ki-moon as his Deputy Special Representative (Humanitarian, Reconstruction and Development) for Iraq. While in Iraq, Shearer also served as the United Nations Resident Coordinator and the Humanitarian Coordinator. In this role he was responsible for managing over $2 billion in aid for developmental projects for 16 different UN agencies.

In March 2013 Shearer admitted he had not declared a US-based bank account in which he received his salary from the UN, saying he had simply forgotten about it.

== Member of Parliament, 2009–2016 ==
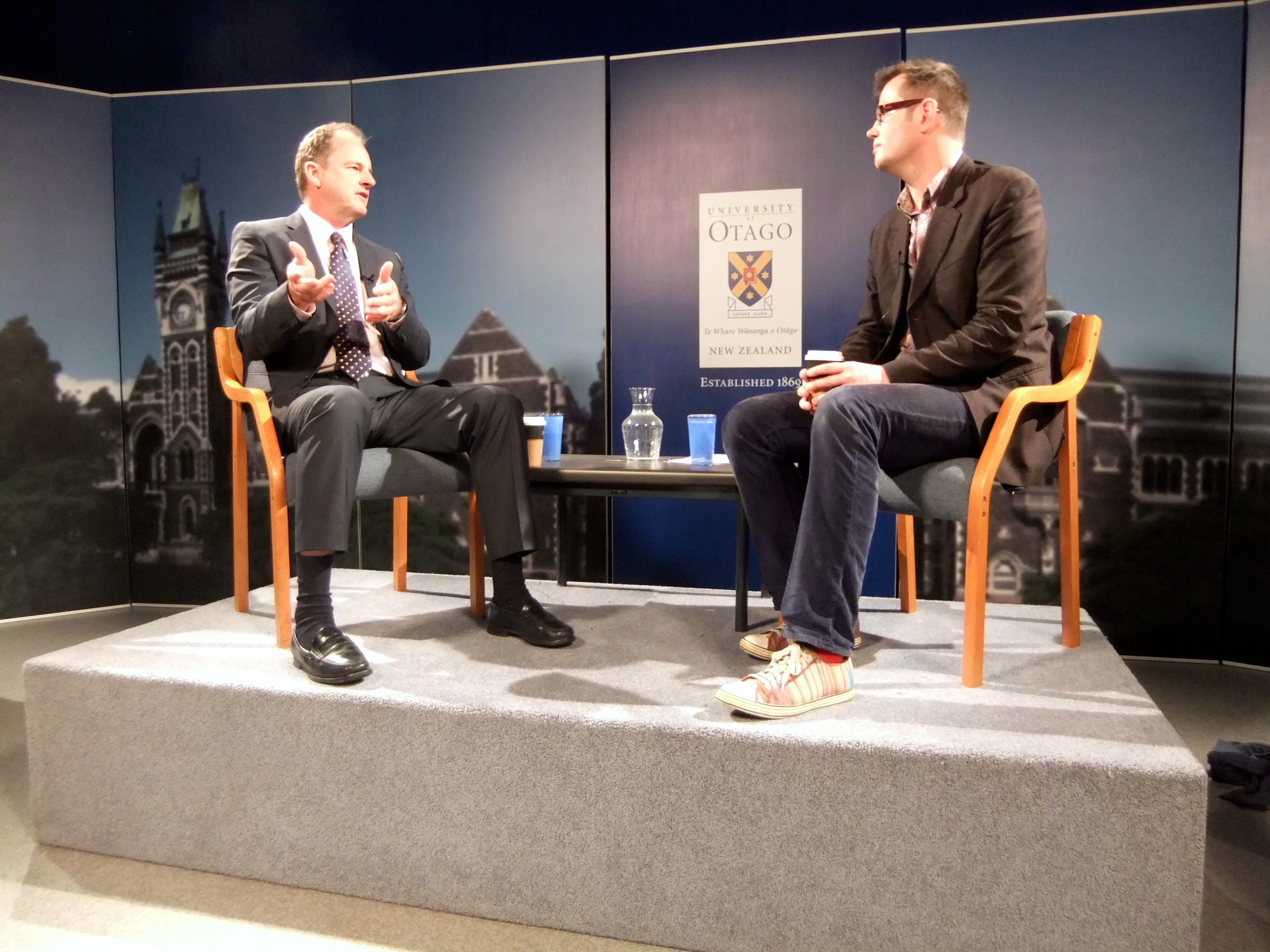
Shearer speaking to University of Otago academic Bryce Edwards in November 2011

New Zealand Parliament
Years	Term	Electorate	List	Party
2009–2011	49th	Mount Albert		Labour
2011–2014	50th	Mount Albert	31	Labour
2014–2016	51st	Mount Albert	13	Labour

Before his election as a Member of Parliament Shearer had twice previously stood for the Labour party: in 1999 he stood as a list-only candidate and in 2002 he unsuccessfully contested the Whangārei electorate. In May 2009 he returned to New Zealand and won the Labour Party nomination for Mount Albert against seven other candidates. He then won the 2009 Mt Albert by-election on 13 June 2009 with 13,260 votes, a majority of 9,718 over National's Melissa Lee. Shearer extended his majority over Lee to 10,021 in the 2011 general election. In the 2014 general election, Shearer further extended his majority over Lee to 10,656.

=== Labour Party leadership election, 2011 ===
In December 2011, following the resignation of Phil Goff, Shearer contested for leadership of the Labour Party. His opponents were David Cunliffe and David Parker. Shearer was viewed as unlikely to win the election; Claire Trevett of The New Zealand Herald originally expected that only Cunliffe and Parker would run for the leader's role, and The Dominion Post's Vernon Small wrote that "Mr Shearer's bid is seen as a way to lift his profile". On 9 December, Horizon Research released a demographically weighted survey which found that 35.4% of adult New Zealanders supported Shearer's bid for the leadership, and 19.9% backed Cunliffe.

On 13 December, Shearer was elected by the Labour caucus. Both One News' Espiner and 3 News reported that Shearer received about twenty-two of the thirty-four votes for the leadership position; however, Party President Moira Coatsworth stipulated that the election was secret and that she was the only person who had access to the ballot papers, which were destroyed.

Grant Robertson won election as Shearer's deputy.

=== Leader of the Opposition, 2011–2013 ===
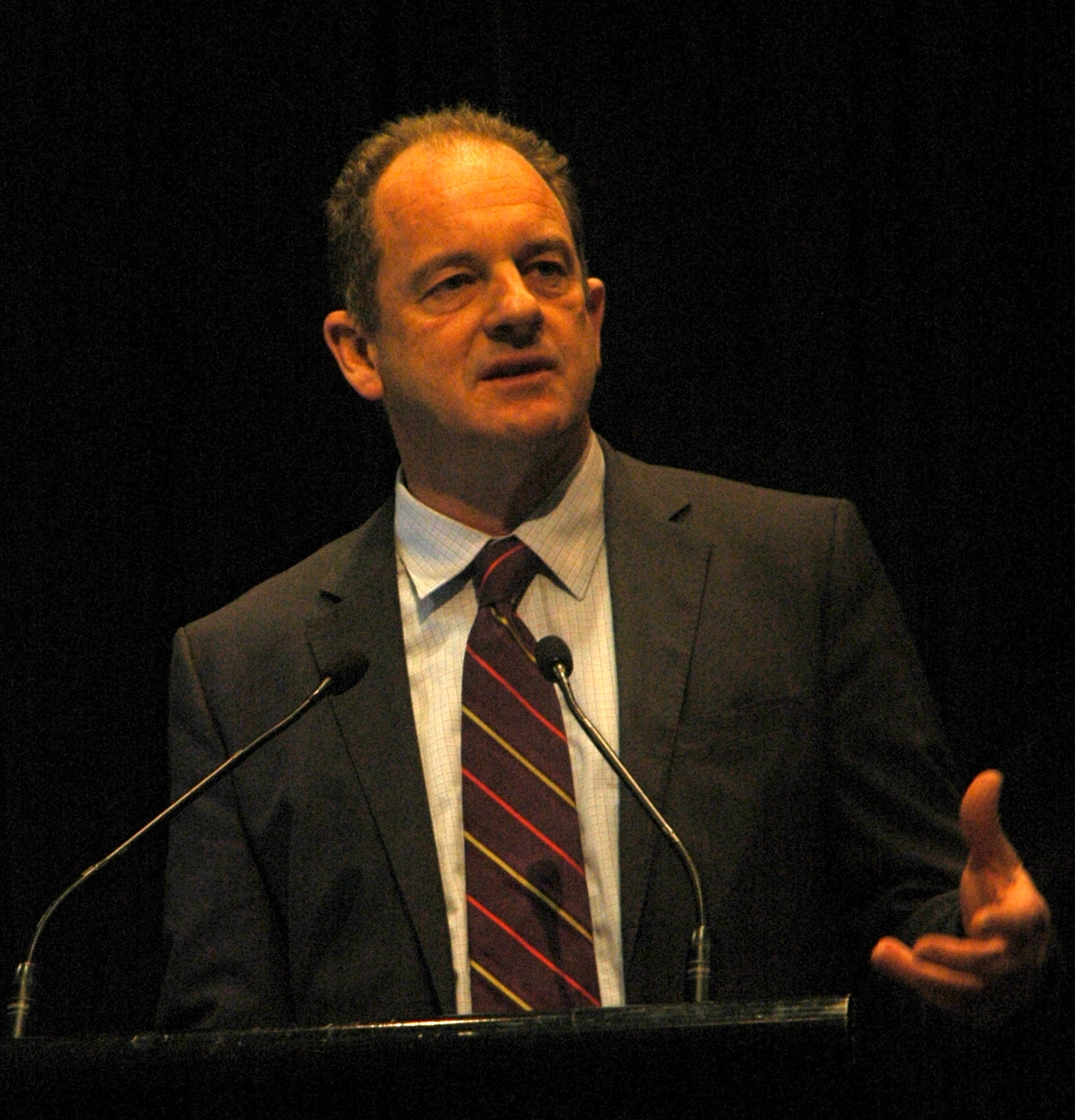
Shearer addresses NetHui, July 2012

Political commentators opined that Shearer was moving the Labour Party towards the centre. Polls suggested that his performance as leader was rated unfavourably with the public, and he had poor name recognition. He was described as "the invisible man of New Zealand politics".

In November 2012 during a Labour Party conference, media speculation suggested that Cunliffe, who was then economic development spokesperson, would launch a challenge against Shearer for leadership of the party. On the morning of 19 November, Cunliffe confirmed he was not challenging Shearer, and would indeed back him if a vote was taken. However, he also said he would not commit to supporting Shearer when he faces a formal confidence vote in February 2013. Media speculation about Cunliffe's intentions marred Shearer's first 12 months as leader. Labour MPs unanimously endorsed leader Shearer at the annual conference, and Shearer subsequently demoted Cunliffe from the front bench.

During Shearer's leadership the Labour Party floated a controversial proposed policy of not considering males for candidate selection. Dubbed the "man ban", the policy was to ensure that 50% of Labour MPs were female by 2017 and allowed local electorate committees to hold all-women shortlists to reach this goal. The policy received backlash with many Labour members (including women) being opposed thinking it discriminatory. After initially remaining silent on the policy, Shearer publicly stated his opposition to the "man ban", noting he was supportive of more women in parliament but the policy was not the right mechanism for it. The policy was subsequently discarded.

Shearer continued to face dissent within the party caucus. On 20 August 2013, a stunt involving Shearer holding up two dead snapper in Parliament, while questioning the Government about proposed changes to recreational fishing management, was not well received. He announced his resignation as Labour leader on 22 August 2013, stating that: "My sense is I no longer have the full confidence of many of my caucus colleagues". Following a party-wide leadership election, Cunliffe was elected Shearer's successor over Deputy Leader Robertson.

Cunliffe appointed Shearer to his Shadow Cabinet as spokesperson for Foreign Affairs and also Energy and Resources.

=== Resignation from Parliament ===
Labour lost the 2014 general election and Cunliffe was replaced as leader by Andrew Little, who reappointed Shearer as Labour's foreign affairs spokesperson. On 8 December 2016 Shearer announced he would resign from Parliament after being chosen to head the United Nations Mission in South Sudan by United Nations secretary general Ban Ki-moon, replacing Dane Ellen Margrethe Løj. His resignation forced a by-election in the Mount Albert electorate, which was won by list MP Jacinda Ardern, who would go on to lead Labour to victory at the 2017 general election.

== Honours and awards ==
In 1992, Shearer, and his wife Anuschka Meyer, were named the New Zealanders of the Year by The New Zealand Herald after running one of the biggest aid camps in Somalia.

In the 1993 New Year Honours, Shearer was appointed a Member of the Order of the British Empire, for welfare services to children in Somalia. In 1994, he was awarded Save the Children's international Award for Gallantry for service in areas of conflict. In 2023, Shearer was conferred an honorary Doctor of Commerce degree by Lincoln University.

New Zealand Parliament
Preceded by Helen Clark	Member of Parliament for Mount Albert; 2009–2016	Succeeded by Jacinda Ardern
Party political offices
Preceded by Phil Goff	Leader of the Labour Party; 2011–2013	Succeeded by David Cunliffe
Political offices
Preceded by Phil Goff	Leader of the Opposition; 2011–2013	Succeeded by David Cunliffe
