= Leader of the New Zealand Labour Party =

Highest ranked politician within the party

Leader of the Labour Party
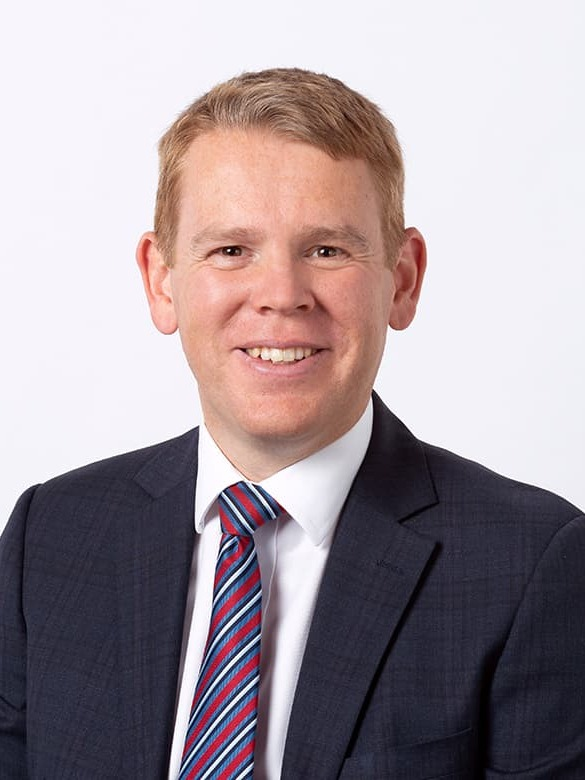
- Incumbent; Chris Hipkins since 22 January 2023
- Term length: No fixed term^{1}
- Inaugural holder: Alfred Hindmarsh
- Formation: 7 July 1916
- Deputy: Deputy Leader of the New Zealand Labour Party
- Website: Labour Party profile
- 1. The leader must be endorsed by the party caucus following a general election, usually every three years, but this does not automatically trigger a new leadership election.

The leader of the Labour Party is the highest-ranked political position within the New Zealand Labour Party, who serves as the parliamentary leader and leading spokesperson of the party. The current leader is Chris Hipkins, after Jacinda Ardern resigned.

== History ==
The post of leader of the Labour Party was officially created upon the party's inception in 1916, though the title "leader" was often substituted and/or complemented with the title "chairman". At the 1935 election, Michael Joseph Savage led the Labour Party to victory, becoming the first Labour prime minister. In 1963, Arnold Nordmeyer became the first New Zealand-born leader of the party; three previous leaders had been born in Australia and one each in England and Scotland. The most electorally successful Labour leader to date is Helen Clark, who won three elections, in 1999, 2002 and 2005. Clark is also the party's longest-serving leader, having served for 14 years, 346 days between 1993 and 2008. Peter Fraser is the longest-serving Labour prime minister, serving 9 years, 261 days between 1940 and 1949.

== Selection ==
A leadership candidate must be a member of parliament (MP). A new leader is elected whenever a vacancy arises, whether due to resignation, incapacitation, or following a motion of no confidence by the parliamentary caucus.

The current election rules were adopted in 2021, replacing earlier rules adopted in 2012. Candidates need 10% of the caucus to nominate. The caucus votes via exhaustive ballot (absent MPs can vote by proxy), and a candidate requires the support of two-thirds of the caucus to be elected. If no one can get two-thirds the candidate with the fewest votes is eliminated. If there are two candidates left and neither got two-thirds, there may be multiple rounds of voting to identify a consensus candidate. If one cannot be found then the leadership is determined by an electoral college comprising the caucus (40% of the total vote), party members (40%) and affiliated trade unions (20%).

No later than three months following a general election, there must be a caucus vote to endorse the leader. If they fail to receive endorsement then the position of party leader is vacated and an election is triggered.

== Role ==
When the Labour Party forms the Parliamentary Opposition, as is the case now, the party leader commonly takes on the position of the leader of the Opposition and chairs a Shadow Cabinet. Likewise, when the party is in Government, the leader typically becomes the prime minister.

Unique to Labour, the party's caucus possesses the right to elect MPs to Cabinet, rather than the leader choosing them. The practice began following the 1940 leadership election. Michael Joseph Savage was the only leader to solely appoint his own cabinet following the election victories in 1935 and 1938.

== List of leaders ==
The following is a complete list of Labour Party leaders (including acting leaders):

Key:
Labour Reform United National
PM: Prime Minister
LO: Leader of the Opposition
†: Died in office

No.	Leader (Birth–Death)	Portrait	Electorate	Term Began	Term Ended	Time in office	Position	Prime Minister
1	Alfred Hindmarsh (1860–1918)		Wellington South	7 July 1916	13 November 1918†	2 years, 129 days	—	Massey 1912–25
2	Harry Holland (1868–1933)		Grey (1918–19); Buller (1919–33)	27 August 1919	8 October 1933†	14 years, 42 days	—	Massey 1912–25
2	Harry Holland (1868–1933)		Grey (1918–19); Buller (1919–33)	27 August 1919	8 October 1933†	14 years, 42 days	—	Bell 1925
2	Harry Holland (1868–1933)		Grey (1918–19); Buller (1919–33)	27 August 1919	8 October 1933†	14 years, 42 days	LO 1926–1928	Coates
2	Harry Holland (1868–1933)		Grey (1918–19); Buller (1919–33)	27 August 1919	8 October 1933†	14 years, 42 days	Junior coalition partner 1928–1931	Ward
2	Harry Holland (1868–1933)		Grey (1918–19); Buller (1919–33)	27 August 1919	8 October 1933†	14 years, 42 days	LO 1931–1933	Forbes
3	Michael Joseph Savage (1872–1940)		Auckland West	12 October 1933	27 March 1940†	6 years, 167 days	LO 1933–1935	Forbes
3	Michael Joseph Savage (1872–1940)		Auckland West	12 October 1933	27 March 1940†	6 years, 167 days	PM 1935–1940	himself
4	Peter Fraser (1884–1950)		Wellington Central (1918–46); Brooklyn (1946–50)	1 April 1940	12 December 1950†	10 years, 255 days	PM 1940–1949	himself
4	Peter Fraser (1884–1950)		Wellington Central (1918–46); Brooklyn (1946–50)	1 April 1940	12 December 1950†	10 years, 255 days	LO 1949–1950	Holland 1949–57
5	Walter Nash (1882–1968)		Hutt	17 January 1951	31 March 1963	12 years, 73 days	LO 1951–1957	Holland 1949–57
5	Walter Nash (1882–1968)		Hutt	17 January 1951	31 March 1963	12 years, 73 days	LO 1951–1957	Holyoake 1957
5	Walter Nash (1882–1968)		Hutt	17 January 1951	31 March 1963	12 years, 73 days	PM 1957–1960	himself
5	Walter Nash (1882–1968)		Hutt	17 January 1951	31 March 1963	12 years, 73 days	LO 1960–1963	Holyoake 1960–72
6	Arnold Nordmeyer (1901–1989)		Island Bay	1 April 1963	16 December 1965	2 years, 259 days	LO 1963–1965	Holyoake 1960–72
7	Norman Kirk (1923–1974)		Lyttelton (1957–69); Sydenham (1969–74)	16 December 1965	31 August 1974†	8 years, 258 days	LO 1965–1972	Holyoake 1960–72
7	Norman Kirk (1923–1974)		Lyttelton (1957–69); Sydenham (1969–74)	16 December 1965	31 August 1974†	8 years, 258 days	LO 1965–1972	Marshall 1972
7	Norman Kirk (1923–1974)		Lyttelton (1957–69); Sydenham (1969–74)	16 December 1965	31 August 1974†	8 years, 258 days	PM 1972–1974	himself
–	Hugh Watt (Note: Deputy leader who assumed the role of party leader temporarily because of the death or resignation of the incumbent, serving until the election of a new leader.) (1912–1980)		Onehunga	31 August 1974	6 September 1974	7 days	PM 1974	himself
8	Bill Rowling (1927–1995)		Tasman	6 September 1974	3 February 1983	8 years, 150 days	PM 1974–1975	himself
8	Bill Rowling (1927–1995)		Tasman	6 September 1974	3 February 1983	8 years, 150 days	LO 1975–1983	Muldoon
9	David Lange (1942–2005)		Mangere	3 February 1983	8 August 1989	6 years, 186 days	LO 1983–1984	Muldoon
9	David Lange (1942–2005)		Mangere	3 February 1983	8 August 1989	6 years, 186 days	PM 1984–1989	himself
10	Geoffrey Palmer (born 1942)		Christchurch Central	8 August 1989	4 September 1990	1 year, 27 days	PM 1989–1990	himself
11	Mike Moore (1949–2020)		Christchurch North	4 September 1990	1 December 1993	3 years, 88 days	PM 1990	himself
11	Mike Moore (1949–2020)		Christchurch North	4 September 1990	1 December 1993	3 years, 88 days	LO 1990–1993	Bolger 1990–97
12	Helen Clark (born 1950)		Mount Albert	1 December 1993	11 November 2008	14 years, 346 days	LO 1993–1999	Bolger 1990–97
12	Helen Clark (born 1950)		Mount Albert	1 December 1993	11 November 2008	14 years, 346 days	LO 1993–1999	Shipley 1997–99
12	Helen Clark (born 1950)		Mount Albert	1 December 1993	11 November 2008	14 years, 346 days	PM 1999–2008	herself
13	Phil Goff (born 1953)		Mount Roskill	11 November 2008	13 December 2011	3 years, 32 days	LO 2008–2011	Key 2008–16
14	David Shearer (born 1957)		Mount Albert	13 December 2011	15 September 2013	1 year, 276 days	LO 2011–2013	Key 2008–16
15	David Cunliffe (born 1963)		New Lynn	15 September 2013	30 September 2014	1 year, 15 days	LO 2013–2014	Key 2008–16
–	David Parker (born 1960)		List MP	30 September 2014	18 November 2014	49 days	LO 2014	Key 2008–16
16	Andrew Little (born 1965)		List MP	18 November 2014	1 August 2017	2 years, 256 days	LO 2014–2017	Key 2008–16
16	Andrew Little (born 1965)		List MP	18 November 2014	1 August 2017	2 years, 256 days	LO 2014–2017	English 2016–17
17	Jacinda Ardern (born 1980)		Mount Albert	1 August 2017	22 January 2023	5 years, 174 days	LO 2017	English 2016–17
17	Jacinda Ardern (born 1980)		Mount Albert	1 August 2017	22 January 2023	5 years, 174 days	PM 2017–2023	herself
18	Chris Hipkins (born 1978)		Remutaka	22 January 2023	Incumbent	3 years, 299 days	PM 2023	himself
18	Chris Hipkins (born 1978)		Remutaka	22 January 2023	Incumbent	3 years, 299 days	LO 2023–present	Luxon 2023–present

== See also ==
- Deputy Leader of the New Zealand Labour Party
- Leader of the New Zealand National Party
- Co-leaders of the Green Party of Aotearoa New Zealand
- Leader of ACT New Zealand
- Leader of the Australian Labor Party
- Category:New Zealand Labour Party leadership elections
