= Father of the House (New Zealand) =

New Zealand political title

Father or Mother of the House is an unofficial title applied to the longest-serving member of Parliament (MP) sitting in the New Zealand House of Representatives. In New Zealand, no duties or special distinctions are associated with the position. The current Father of the House is Chris Hipkins, member for Remutaka. He has served continuously in the House of Representatives since 8 November 2008. The current Mother of the House, as the longest continuously serving female MP, is Louise Upston, member for Taupō. She was first elected in 2008.

The position is usually determined by continuous service, not aggregate time in parliament or the earliest year of entry. As of 2026, Winston Peters is the longest serving current MP based on overall time served (over 38 years), having first entered parliament in 1978, but since this time has not been continuous he is not considered Father of the House. When more than one MP have served equally long periods, the title is usually assigned to whoever was sworn in first, a process which happens alphabetically by surname.

In New Zealand's first general election of 1853, the Bay of Islands electorate was the first to declare the election of a successful candidate, Hugh Carleton, who was returned unopposed. In the subsequent General Assembly of 1854, Carleton liked to be known as the Father of the House.

In March 2005 then Prime Minister Helen Clark became the first to be dubbed Mother of the House.

== List of Fathers and Mothers of the House ==
Key

Independent	Liberal	Reform	United
Labour	National	Progressive	United Future

Fathers of the House
Name	Image	First elected	Became Father	Left Parliament	Time in Parliament	Time as Father	Notes	References
Hugh Carleton		14 July 1853		30 December 1870 (Note: date of dissolution of the 4th Parliament)	17 years, 5 months and 16 days		Defeated in 1871 election	
Alfred Brandon		29 July 1858	30 December 1870	8 November 1881 (Note: date of dissolution of the 7th Parliament)	23 years, 3 months and 10 days	10 years, 10 months, 10 days	Retired in 1881	
Sir Maurice O'Rorke		18 January 1861	8 November 1881	3 October 1890 (Note: date of dissolution of the 10th Parliament)	29 years, 8 months and 15 days	8 years, 10 months, 26 days	Defeated in 1890 election, re-elected in 1893	
Harry Atkinson		3 October 1872 (Note: Atkinson had previously been an MP (1861–66 and 1867–69))	3 October 1890	22 January 1891	18 years, 3 months and 19 days	3 months, 20 days	Premier 1876–1877, 1883–1884, 1884, 1887–1891; resigned in 1891 (Note: Atkinson resigned upon being appointed to the Legislative Council)	
Ebenezer Hamlin		18 January 1876	22 January 1891	8 November 1893 (Note: date of dissolution of the 11th Parliament)	17 years, 9 months and 21 days	2 years, 9 months, 18 days	Retired in 1893	
Richard Seddon		5 September 1879	8 November 1893	10 June 1906	26 years, 9 months and 5 days	12 years, 7 months, 3 days	Prime Minister 1893–1906; died in office	
Sir William Steward		9 December 1881 (Note: Steward had previously been an MP (1871–75))	10 June 1906	20 November 1911 (Note: date of dissolution of the 17th Parliament)	29 years, 11 months and 11 days	5 years, 5 months, 11 days	Retired in 1911	
Sir Arthur Guinness		22 July 1884	20 November 1911	10 June 1913	28 years, 10 months and 19 days	1 year, 6 months, 21 days	Died in office	
Sir James Carroll		7 September 1887	10 June 1913	27 November 1919 (Note: date of dissolution of the 19th Parliament)	32 years, 2 months and 20 days	6 years, 5 months, 18 days	Defeated in 1919 election	
Sir James Allen		4 May 1892 (Note: Allen had previously been an MP (1887–90))	27 November 1919	22 March 1920	37 years, 10 months and 18 days	3 months, 25 days	Resigned in 1920	
William Massey		9 April 1894	22 March 1920	10 May 1925	31 years, 1 month and 1 day	5 years, 1 month, 20 days	Prime Minister 1912–1925; died in office	
Sir Thomas Wilford		4 December 1896	10 May 1925	18 November 1929	32 years, 11 months and 14 days	4 years, 6 months, 8 days	Resigned in 1929 (Note: Wilford resigned to take up the post of High Commissioner to the United Kingdom)	
Sir Āpirana Ngata		20 December 1905	18 November 1929	30 August 1943 (Note: date of dissolution of the 26th Parliament)	37 years, 8 months and 10 days	13 years, 9 months, 12 days	Defeated in 1943 election	
Peter Fraser		3 October 1918	30 August 1943	12 December 1950	32 years, 2 months and 9 days	7 years, 3 months, 13 days	Prime Minister 1940–1949; died in office	
Bill Parry		17 December 1919	12 December 1950	27 July 1951 (Note: date of dissolution of the 29th Parliament)	31 years, 7 months and 10 days	7 months, 16 days	Retired in 1951	
Robert McKeen		7 December 1922	27 July 1951	5 October 1954 (Note: date of dissolution of the 30th Parliament)	31 years, 9 months and 28 days	3 years, 2 months, 8 days	Retired in 1954	
Rex Mason		15 April 1926	5 October 1954	25 October 1966 (Note: date of dissolution of the 34th Parliament)	40 years, 6 months and 10 days	12 years, 20 days	Retired in 1966	
Sir Walter Nash		18 December 1929	25 October 1966	4 June 1968	38 years, 7 months and 17 days	1 year, 7 months, 10 days	Prime Minister 1957–1960; died in office	
Robert Macfarlane		3 June 1939	4 June 1968	24 October 1969 (Note: date of dissolution of the 39th Parliament)	30 years, 4 months and 21 days	1 year, 4 months, 20 days	Retired in 1969	
Sir Keith Holyoake		25 September 1943 (Note: Holyoake had previously been an MP (1932–38))	24 October 1969	10 March 1977	33 years, 5 months and 13 days	7 years, 4 months, 14 days	Prime Minister 1957, 1960–1972; resigned in 1977 (Note: Holyoake resigned to take up the post of Governor-General)	
Warren Freer		24 September 1947	10 March 1977	29 October 1981 (Note: date of dissolution of the 39th Parliament)	34 years, 1 month and 5 days	4 years, 7 months, 19 days	Retired in 1981	
Mick Connelly		27 October 1956	29 October 1981	14 June 1984 (Note: date of dissolution of the 40th Parliament)	27 years, 7 months and 18 days	2 years, 7 months, 16 days	Retired in 1984	
Sir Robert Muldoon		26 November 1960	14 June 1984	17 December 1991	31 years and 21 days	7 years, 6 months, 3 days	Prime Minister 1975–1984; resigned in 1991	
Jonathan Hunt		26 November 1966	17 December 1991	30 March 2005	38 years, 4 months and 4 days	13 years, 4 months, 13 days	Resigned in 2005 (Note: Hunt resigned to take up the post of High Commissioner to the United Kingdom)	
Title not in use
Michael Cullen		28 November 1981	18 April 2009	29 April 2009	27 years, 5 months and 1 day	12 days	Resigned in 2009	
Jim Anderton		14 July 1984	29 April 2009	26 November 2011	27 years, 4 months and 12 days	2 years, 6 months, 3 days	Retired in 2011; Deemed to hold the post ahead of Peter Dunne due to the alphabetical order in which they were sworn in.	
Peter Dunne		14 July 1984	26 November 2011	23 September 2017	33 years, 2 months and 9 days	5 years, 9 months, 28 days	Retired at the 2017 election.	
Bill English		27 October 1990	23 September 2017	13 March 2018	27 years, 4 months and 14 days	5 months, 18 days	Prime Minister 2016–2017; resigned in 2018; Deemed to be the Father ahead of Nick Smith due to the alphabetical order in which they were sworn in.	
Nick Smith		27 October 1990	13 March 2018	10 June 2021	30 years, 7 months and 14 days	3 years, 2 months, 28 days	Resigned in 2021	
Trevor Mallard		6 November 1993 (Note: Mallard had previously been an MP (1984–90))	10 June 2021	20 October 2022	28 years, 11 months and 14 days	1 year, 4 months and 11 days	Resigned in 2022	
Gerry Brownlee (Note: Brownlee and Mahuta were considered Father and Mother concurrently between 21 October 2021 and 14 October 2023.)		12 October 1996	21 October 2022	7 November 2026	30 years and 1 month	4 years and 1 month	Defeated in the 2026 election.	
Chris Hipkins		8 November 2008	7 November 2026	Incumbent	18 years and 13 days	14 days		

Mothers of the House
Name	Image	First elected	Became Mother	Left Parliament	Time in Parliament	Time as Mother	Notes	References
Helen Clark		28 November 1981	30 March 2005	18 April 2009	27 years, 4 months and 21 days	4 years, 19 days	Prime Minister 1999–2008; resigned in 2009; Deemed to hold the post ahead of Michael Cullen due to the alphabetical order in which they were sworn in.	
Title not in use
Nanaia Mahuta		12 October 1996	21 October 2022	14 October 2023	26 years, 11 months and 23 days	11 months and 24 days	Defeated in the 2023 election	
Judith Collins (Note: Brownlee and Collins were considered Father and Mother concurrently between 14 October 2023 and 12 May 2026.)		27 July 2002	14 October 2023	14 May 2026	24 years, 3 months and 25 days	2 years, 7 months and 1 day	Retired in 2026	
Melissa Lee		8 November 2008	14 May 2026	7 November 2026	18 years and 13 days	6 months and 7 days	Deemed to hold the post ahead of Louise Upston due to the alphabetical order in which they were sworn in. Defeated in the 2026 election.	
Louise Upston		8 November 2008	7 November 2026	Incumbent	18 years and 13 days	14 days		

Table footnotes:

== See also ==
- Baby of the House for youngest MPs when first elected.
- Father of the House, for similar traditions in other country's legislatures
