= List of longest-serving members of the New Zealand House of Representatives =

This is a list of members of the New Zealand House of Representatives who have served for at least 30 years. The time of service is not always continuous and separate terms are aggregated. Thirty-six individuals have served in excess of 30 years in the House. Two individuals on the list are current members: Winston Peters and Damien O'Connor.

== Members of Parliament who have served for at least 30 years ==
Key

Liberal	Reform	Labour
National	NZ First	United Future

† Died in office

Name	Portrait	First elected	Left Parliament	Highest office held	Period of service	References
Rex Mason		15 April 1926	25 October 1966 (Note: date of dissolution of the 34th Parliament)	Cabinet Minister	40 years, 193 days	
Sir Keith Holyoake		1 December 1932	10 March 1977	Prime Minister	39 years, 94 days	
Winston Peters		24 May 1979	present	Deputy Prime Minister	38 years, 253 days	
Sir Maurice O'Rorke		18 January 1861	5 November 1902 (Note: date of dissolution of the 14th Parliament)	Speaker of the House	38 years, 235 days	
Sir Walter Nash		18 December 1929	4 June 1968†	Prime Minister	38 years, 169 days	
Jonathan Hunt		26 November 1966	30 March 2005	Speaker of the House	38 years, 124 days	
Sir Āpirana Ngata		20 December 1905	30 August 1943 (Note: date of dissolution of the 26th Parliament)	Cabinet Minister	37 years, 253 days	
Sir Joseph Ward		26 September 1887	8 July 1930†	Prime Minister	36 years, 306 days	
Trevor Mallard		14 July 1984	20 October 2022	Speaker of the House	35 years, 87 days	
Sir William Steward		3 February 1871	20 November 1911 (Note: date of dissolution of the 17th Parliament)	Speaker of the House	34 years, 287 days	
George Forbes		17 November 1908	30 August 1943 (Note: date of dissolution of the 26th Parliament)	Prime Minister	34 years, 286 days	
Sir Eruera Tirikātene		3 August 1932	11 January 1967†	Cabinet Minister	34 years, 161 days	
Warren Freer		24 September 1947	29 October 1981 (Note: date of dissolution of the 39th Parliament)	Cabinet Minister	34 years, 35 days	
Clyde Carr		14 November 1928	31 May 1962	Chairman of Committees	33 years, 198 days	
Peter Dunne		14 July 1984	23 September 2017	Cabinet Minister	33 years, 71 days	
William Hughes Field		6 January 1900	1 November 1935	MP	32 years, 278 days	
Sir Arnold Nordmeyer		27 November 1935	28 October 1969	Leader of the Opposition	32 years, 230 days	
Damien O'Connor		6 November 1993	present	Cabinet Minister	32 years, 194 days	
Sir James Carroll		7 September 1887	27 November 1919 (Note: date of dissolution of the 19th Parliament)	Cabinet Minister	32 years, 81 days	
Peter Fraser		3 October 1918	12 December 1950†	Prime Minister	32 years, 70 days	
Phil Goff		28 November 1981	12 October 2016	Leader of the Opposition	31 years, 309 days	
Robert McKeen		7 December 1922	5 October 1954 (Note: date of dissolution of the 30th Parliament)	Speaker of the House	31 years, 302 days	
Bill Parry		17 December 1919	27 July 1951 (Note: date of dissolution of the 29th Parliament)	Cabinet Minister	31 years, 222 days	
Gordon Coates		19 December 1911	27 May 1943†	Prime Minister	31 years, 159 days	
Sir Robert Muldoon		26 November 1960	17 December 1991	Prime Minister	31 years, 35 days	
William Massey		9 April 1894	10 May 1925†	Prime Minister	31 years, 31 days	
Sir James Allen		26 September 1887	22 March 1920	Cabinet Minister	30 years, 330 days	
Nick Smith		27 October 1990	10 June 2021	Cabinet Minister	30 years, 226 days	
Bob Tizard		30 November 1957	27 October 1990	Deputy Prime Minister	30 years, 196 days	
Sir Robert Macfarlane		3 June 1939	28 October 1969 (Note: date of dissolution of the 35th Parliament)	Speaker of the House	30 years, 147 days	
Sir Thomas Wilford		4 December 1896	18 November 1929	Leader of the Opposition	30 years, 109 days	
Annette King		14 July 1984	23 September 2017	Cabinet Minister	30 years, 63 days	
Murray McCully		15 August 1987	23 September 2017	Cabinet Minister	30 years, 39 days	
Maurice Williamson		15 August 1987	23 September 2017	Cabinet Minister	30 years, 39 days	
Gerry Brownlee		12 October 1996	7 November 2026	Speaker of the House	30 years, 26 days	
Tom Duncan		9 December 1881	19 December 1911	Cabinet Minister	30 years, 10 days	

Table footnotes:

== See also ==
- Father of the House (New Zealand)
- List of longest-serving members of the Parliament of Australia
