= Leader of the Opposition (New Zealand) =

Parliamentary position of the Parliament of New Zealand

Leader of the Official Opposition of New Zealand
- Coat of Arms

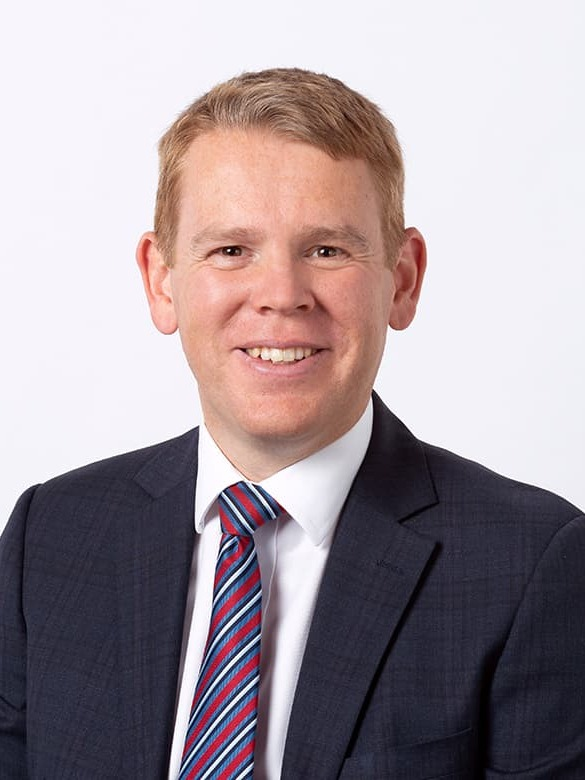
- Incumbent; Chris Hipkins since 27 November 2023
- Official Opposition of New Zealand
- Reports to: Parliament
- Term length: While leader of the largest political party in the House of Representatives that is not in government
- Inaugural holder: John Ballance^{[a]}
- Formation: 2 July 1889^{[b]}
- Salary: $288,900 (As at 2016)
- a. As the first parliamentary leader of an Opposition party. b. The date Ballance was officially named Leader of the Opposition.

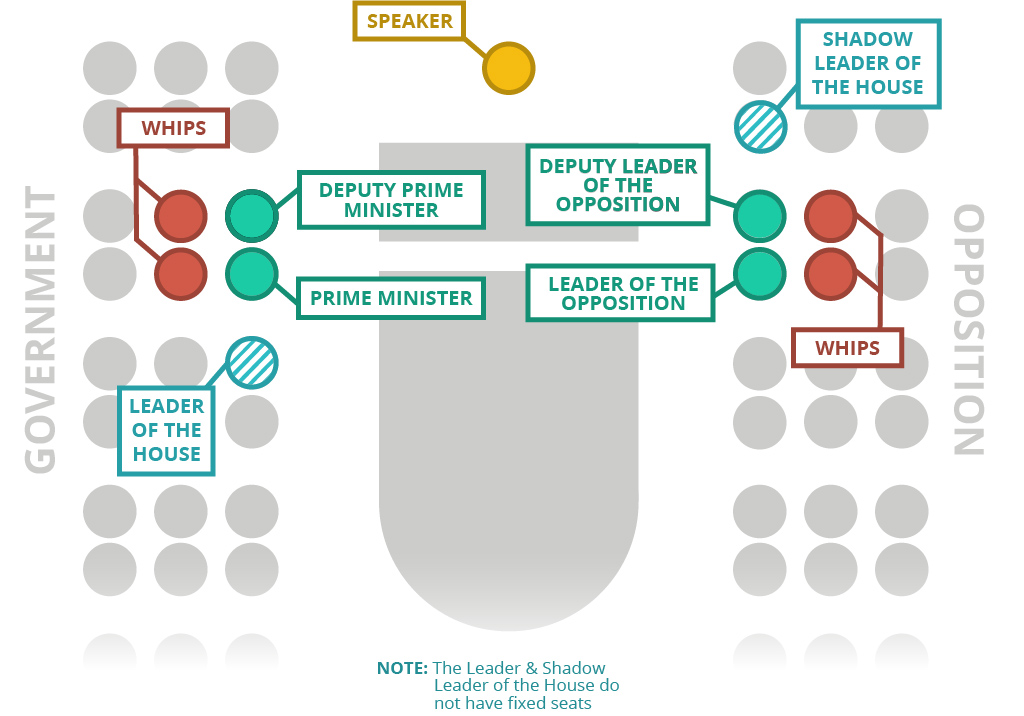
In parliament, the leader of the Opposition sits near the front to the left of the speaker's chair (annotated)

In New Zealand, the leader of the Official Opposition, commonly described as the leader of the Opposition, is the politician who heads the Official Opposition. Conventionally, they are the leader of the largest political party in the House of Representatives that is not in Government (nor provides confidence and supply). This is usually the parliamentary leader of the second-largest caucus in the House of Representatives.

When in the debating chamber the leader of the Opposition sits on the left-hand side of the centre table, in front of the Opposition and directly opposite the prime minister.

The role of the leader of the Opposition dates to the late 19th century, with the first organised political parties, and the office was formally recognised by law in 1933. Although currently mentioned in a number of statutes, the office is not formally established by any act of Parliament, just like the prime minister's role; it is simply a product of the conventions of the Westminster-style parliamentary system. The leader of the Opposition is paid a special salary by virtue of the office, equivalent to that of a Cabinet minister.

Since 1936, the leader of the Opposition, as well as the prime minister, has invariably come from one of the two major parties, Labour or National. Therefore, the leader of the Opposition has historically acquired that role by either losing a general election having previously been prime minister or by acquiring the leadership of the party that is already the Official Opposition. The rules on electing party leadership vary between parties.

Since the outcome of the 2023 general election, the current holder of the office is the leader of the New Zealand Labour Party and former prime minister Chris Hipkins.

== Role ==
The term "opposition" has a specific meaning in the parliamentary sense; it is an important component of the Westminster system, with the Official Opposition having the task of directing criticism towards the Government. The leader of the Opposition chairs a Shadow Cabinet, which scrutinises the policies and actions of the Cabinet led by the prime minister, and promotes alternative policies. Directed by the leader, the Opposition may move no-confidence motions to test the Government's majority or the confidence of the House. The leader of the Opposition may be asked by the governor-general to form a new government if the incumbent government is unable to continue in office (e.g. upon a successful no-confidence motion).

Apart from parliamentary duties, there are several ways in which the leader of the Opposition participates directly in affairs of state. Often, these relate to national security matters, which are supposed to transcend party politics – the New Zealand Security Intelligence Service, for example, is required to brief the leader of the Opposition as well as the prime minister on certain matters of national security.

== Salary ==
The leader of the Opposition receives a higher salary than other members of the Opposition, being paid the same amount as a Cabinet minister. As at 2016 the Leader of the Opposition's salary is NZ$288,900. In addition, like all other members of parliament, the leader of the Opposition receives annual allowances for travel and lodging.

== History ==
For much of the country's early history, the role was not a formal one. For most of the 19th century, there was rarely any one person who could be identified as the leader of the Opposition. Prominent members were sometimes informally dubbed as "Leader of the Opposition" – often facetiously by rival politicians. It was only when the Liberal Party was formed that any unified leadership appeared in Parliament, and the role of Opposition leader is generally traced from this point. John Ballance, leader of the Liberals (and later premier) is usually considered the first leader of the Opposition in the modern sense.

When Ballance led the Liberals into government in 1891, they faced no formal opposition in a party sense, though certain MPs were styled leader of the Opposition. Their opponents gradually coalesced around a leader, William Massey, who became leader of the Opposition in 1903, and in 1909 became the first parliamentary leader of the new Reform Party. For the first time, an Opposition party came forward as an alternative government. After this, the leader of the Opposition was typically the parliamentary leader of the largest party in the House of Representatives that had not undertaken to support the government of the day.

One exception to this was during World War I, when the opposition Liberal Party accepted the governing Reform Party's offer to form a wartime coalition. Prime Minister Massey also extended the offer to the new Labour Party who rejected it. This made Labour the largest party not in government, however their leader Alfred Hindmarsh was not officially recognised as the leader of the Opposition. Joseph Ward, who became deputy prime minister in the wartime cabinet, still retained the title, albeit in name only.

During the 1910s and 1920s, the role of Official Opposition alternated between the Liberal and Reform parties. However, the rise of the Labour Party in the 1920s, together with a gradual weakening in support for the Liberals, led to a three-party situation by the mid-1920s, with the Labour and Liberal parties having a similar number of seats. After the 1925 election there was no official leader of the Opposition until Rex Mason of Labour won the seat of Eden in the by-election held on 15 April 1926. Labour superseded the Liberals as the Official Opposition, and their leader Harry Holland became the leader of the Opposition.

The 1928 general election put the United Party (a remnant of the Liberals) in government for the last time. Reform then became the Opposition, however in 1931 Reform entered into coalition with the Liberals, and Labour then became the Official Opposition, despite being the third party. The unity of the coalition, culminating in the formation of the National Party in 1936, created a stable two-party system, with National and Labour alternating between Government and Opposition for much of the remainder of the century.

=== Modern office ===
The office was first officially recognised in section 14 of the Finance Act 1933 (no 2), when a special allowance was conferred on the holder.

With the introduction of the mixed-member proportional (MMP) voting system, first used in the 1996 general election, the nature of parliamentary opposition has changed. Now, though the leader of the largest non-Government party still becomes the leader of the Opposition, there will usually be several parties who are "in opposition". An example of this arose after the 2002 general election, when the National Party gained only 27 seats – less than half the 58 seats held by opposition parties. This prompted calls from a number of parties, notably New Zealand First and the Greens, for the abolition or reform of the post. It was argued by these parties that the position had become an "anachronism" in the modern multi-party environment, and that the days of a united opposition bloc were gone. However, with the revival of the National Party in the 2005 general election, a more traditional relationship between Government and Opposition has been restored. According to Parliamentary Services, the leader of the Opposition formally represents and speaks for all parties that are outside Government.

== List of leaders of the Opposition ==
A table of leaders is below. Those who also served as prime minister, either before or after being leader of the Opposition, are indicated.

Key

Liberal Conservative Reform Labour United National

No.	Leader (Birth–Death) Constituency	Portrait	Term of office		Party	Prime Minister
1	John Ballance (1839–1893); MP for Wanganui		2 July 1889	23 January 1891	Liberal	Atkinson; 1887–91
2	John Bryce (1833–1913); MP for Waikato		23 January 1891	31 August 1891	Conservative	Ballance; 1891–93
3	William Rolleston (1831–1903); MP for Halswell		31 August 1891	8 November 1893	Conservative	Ballance; 1891–93
3	William Rolleston (1831–1903); MP for Halswell		31 August 1891	8 November 1893	Conservative	Seddon; 1893–1906
4	William Russell (1838–1913); MP for Hawkes Bay		26 June 1894	3 July 1901	Conservative	Seddon; 1893–1906
5	William Massey (1856–1925); MP for Franklin		11 September 1903	February 1909	Conservative	Seddon; 1893–1906
5	William Massey (1856–1925); MP for Franklin		11 September 1903	February 1909	Conservative	Hall-Jones; 1906
5	William Massey (1856–1925); MP for Franklin		11 September 1903	February 1909	Conservative	Ward; 1906–12
5	William Massey (1856–1925); MP for Franklin		February 1909	10 July 1912	Reform	Ward; 1906–12
5	William Massey (1856–1925); MP for Franklin		February 1909	10 July 1912	Reform	Mackenzie; 1912
6	Joseph Ward (1856–1930); MP for Awarua (Note: From 4 August 1915 to 21 August 1919, the Reform Party and the Liberal Party formed a joint wartime coalition. Joseph Ward of the Liberals officially remained "Leader of the Opposition", even though he was actually part of the government.)		11 September 1913	27 November 1919	Liberal	Massey; 1912–25
7	William MacDonald (1862–1920); MP for Bay of Plenty		21 January 1920	31 August 1920†	Liberal	Massey; 1912–25
8	Thomas Wilford (1870–1939); MP for Hutt		8 September 1920	13 August 1925	Liberal	Massey; 1912–25
8	Thomas Wilford (1870–1939); MP for Hutt		8 September 1920	13 August 1925	Liberal	Bell; 1925
8	Thomas Wilford (1870–1939); MP for Hutt		8 September 1920	13 August 1925	Liberal	Coates; 1925–28
9	George Forbes (1869–1947); MP for Hurunui		13 August 1925	4 November 1925	Liberal	Coates; 1925–28
Position vacant from 1925 general election until after 1926 Eden by-election			4 November 1925	16 June 1926	—	Coates; 1925–28
10	Harry Holland (1868–1933); MP for Buller		16 June 1926	18 October 1928	Labour	Coates; 1925–28
(6)	Joseph Ward (1856–1930); MP for Invercargill		4 December 1928	10 December 1928	United	Coates; 1925–28
11	Gordon Coates (1878–1943); MP for Kaipara		10 December 1928	22 September 1931	Reform	Ward; 1928–30
11	Gordon Coates (1878–1943); MP for Kaipara		10 December 1928	22 September 1931	Reform	Forbes; 1930–35
(10)	Harry Holland (1868–1933); MP for Buller		22 September 1931	8 October 1933†	Labour	Forbes; 1930–35
12	Michael Joseph Savage (1872–1940); MP for Auckland West		12 October 1933	6 December 1935	Labour	Forbes; 1930–35
(9)	George Forbes (1869–1947); MP for Hurunui		6 December 1935	14 May 1936	United	Savage; 1935–40
(9)	George Forbes (1869–1947); MP for Hurunui		14 May 1936	2 November 1936	National	Savage; 1935–40
13	Adam Hamilton (1880–1952); MP for Wallace		2 November 1936	26 November 1940	National	Savage; 1935–40
13	Adam Hamilton (1880–1952); MP for Wallace		2 November 1936	26 November 1940	National	Fraser; 1940–49
14	Sidney Holland (1893–1961); MP for Christchurch North until 1946; MP for Fendalton from 1946		26 November 1940	13 December 1949	National	Fraser; 1940–49
15	Peter Fraser (1884–1950); MP for Brooklyn		13 December 1949	12 December 1950†	Labour	Holland; 1949–57
16	Walter Nash (1882–1968); MP for Hutt		17 January 1951	12 December 1957	Labour	Holland; 1949–57
16	Walter Nash (1882–1968); MP for Hutt		17 January 1951	12 December 1957	Labour	Holyoake; 1957
17	Keith Holyoake (1904–1983); MP for Pahiatua		12 December 1957	12 December 1960	National	Nash; 1957–60
(16)	Walter Nash (1882–1968); MP for Hutt		12 December 1960	31 March 1963	Labour	Holyoake; 1960–72
18	Arnold Nordmeyer (1901–1989); MP for Island Bay		1 April 1963	16 December 1965	Labour	Holyoake; 1960–72
19	Norman Kirk (1923–1974); MP for Lyttelton until 1969; MP for Sydenham from 1969		16 December 1965	8 December 1972	Labour	Holyoake; 1960–72
19	Norman Kirk (1923–1974); MP for Lyttelton until 1969; MP for Sydenham from 1969		16 December 1965	8 December 1972	Labour	Marshall; 1972
20	Jack Marshall (1912–1988); MP for Karori		8 December 1972	9 July 1974	National	Kirk; 1972–74
21	Robert Muldoon (1921–1992); MP for Tāmaki		9 July 1974	12 December 1975	National	Kirk; 1972–74
21	Robert Muldoon (1921–1992); MP for Tāmaki		9 July 1974	12 December 1975	National	Rowling; 1974–75
22	Bill Rowling (1927–1995); MP for Tasman		12 December 1975	3 February 1983	Labour	Muldoon; 1975–84
23	David Lange (1942–2005); MP for Māngere		3 February 1983	26 July 1984	Labour	Muldoon; 1975–84
(21)	Robert Muldoon (1921–1992); MP for Tāmaki		26 July 1984	29 November 1984	National	Lange; 1984–89
24	Jim McLay (born 1945); MP for Birkenhead		29 November 1984	26 March 1986	National	Lange; 1984–89
25	Jim Bolger (1935–2025); MP for King Country		26 March 1986	2 November 1990	National	Lange; 1984–89
25	Jim Bolger (1935–2025); MP for King Country		26 March 1986	2 November 1990	National	Palmer; 1989–90
25	Jim Bolger (1935–2025); MP for King Country		26 March 1986	2 November 1990	National	Moore; 1990
26	Mike Moore (1949–2020); MP for Christchurch North		2 November 1990	1 December 1993	Labour	Bolger; 1990–97
27	Helen Clark (born 1950); MP for Mount Albert		1 December 1993	10 December 1999	Labour	Bolger; 1990–97
27	Helen Clark (born 1950); MP for Mount Albert		1 December 1993	10 December 1999	Labour	Shipley; 1997–99
28	Jenny Shipley (born 1952); MP for Rakaia		10 December 1999	8 October 2001	National	Clark; 1999–2008
29	Bill English (born 1961); MP for Clutha-Southland		8 October 2001	28 October 2003	National	Clark; 1999–2008
30	Don Brash (born 1940); List MP		28 October 2003	27 November 2006	National	Clark; 1999–2008
31	John Key (born 1961); MP for Helensville		27 November 2006	19 November 2008	National	Clark; 1999–2008
32	Phil Goff (born 1953); MP for Mount Roskill		19 November 2008	13 December 2011	Labour	Key; 2008–16
33	David Shearer (born 1957); MP for Mount Albert		13 December 2011	15 September 2013	Labour	Key; 2008–16
34	David Cunliffe (born 1963); MP for New Lynn		15 September 2013	27 September 2014	Labour	Key; 2008–16
—	David Parker (Note: David Parker assumed the position of interim leader of the Labour Party due to the resignation of former leader David Cunliffe.) (born 1960); List MP; Interim Leader of the Labour Party		30 September 2014	18 November 2014	Labour	Key; 2008–16
35	Andrew Little (born 1965); List MP		18 November 2014	1 August 2017	Labour	Key; 2008–16
35	Andrew Little (born 1965); List MP		18 November 2014	1 August 2017	Labour	English; 2016–17
36	Jacinda Ardern (born 1980); MP for Mount Albert		1 August 2017	26 October 2017	Labour	English; 2016–17
(29)	Bill English (born 1961); List MP		26 October 2017	27 February 2018	National	Ardern; 2017–23
37	Simon Bridges (born 1976); MP for Tauranga		27 February 2018	22 May 2020	National	Ardern; 2017–23
38	Todd Muller (born 1968); MP for Bay of Plenty		22 May 2020	14 July 2020	National	Ardern; 2017–23
—	Nikki Kaye (Note: Nikki Kaye assumed the position of interim leader of the National Party for a few hours due to the resignation of leader Todd Muller.) (1980-2024); MP for Auckland Central; Interim Leader of the National Party		14 July 2020		National	Ardern; 2017–23
39	Judith Collins (born 1959); MP for Papakura		14 July 2020	25 November 2021	National	Ardern; 2017–23
—	Shane Reti (Note: Shane Reti assumed the position of interim leader of the National Party due to the motion of no confidence against former leader Judith Collins.) (born 1963); List MP; Interim Leader of the National Party		25 November 2021	30 November 2021	National	Ardern; 2017–23
40	Christopher Luxon (born 1970); MP for Botany		30 November 2021	27 November 2023	National	Ardern; 2017–23
40	Christopher Luxon (born 1970); MP for Botany		30 November 2021	27 November 2023	National	Hipkins; 2023
41	Chris Hipkins (born 1978); MP for Remutaka		27 November 2023	Incumbent	Labour	Luxon; 2023–present

== See also ==
- List of prime ministers of New Zealand
