= Walter Nash =

Prime Minister of New Zealand from 1957 to 1960

The Right Honourable Sir Walter Nash GCMG CH
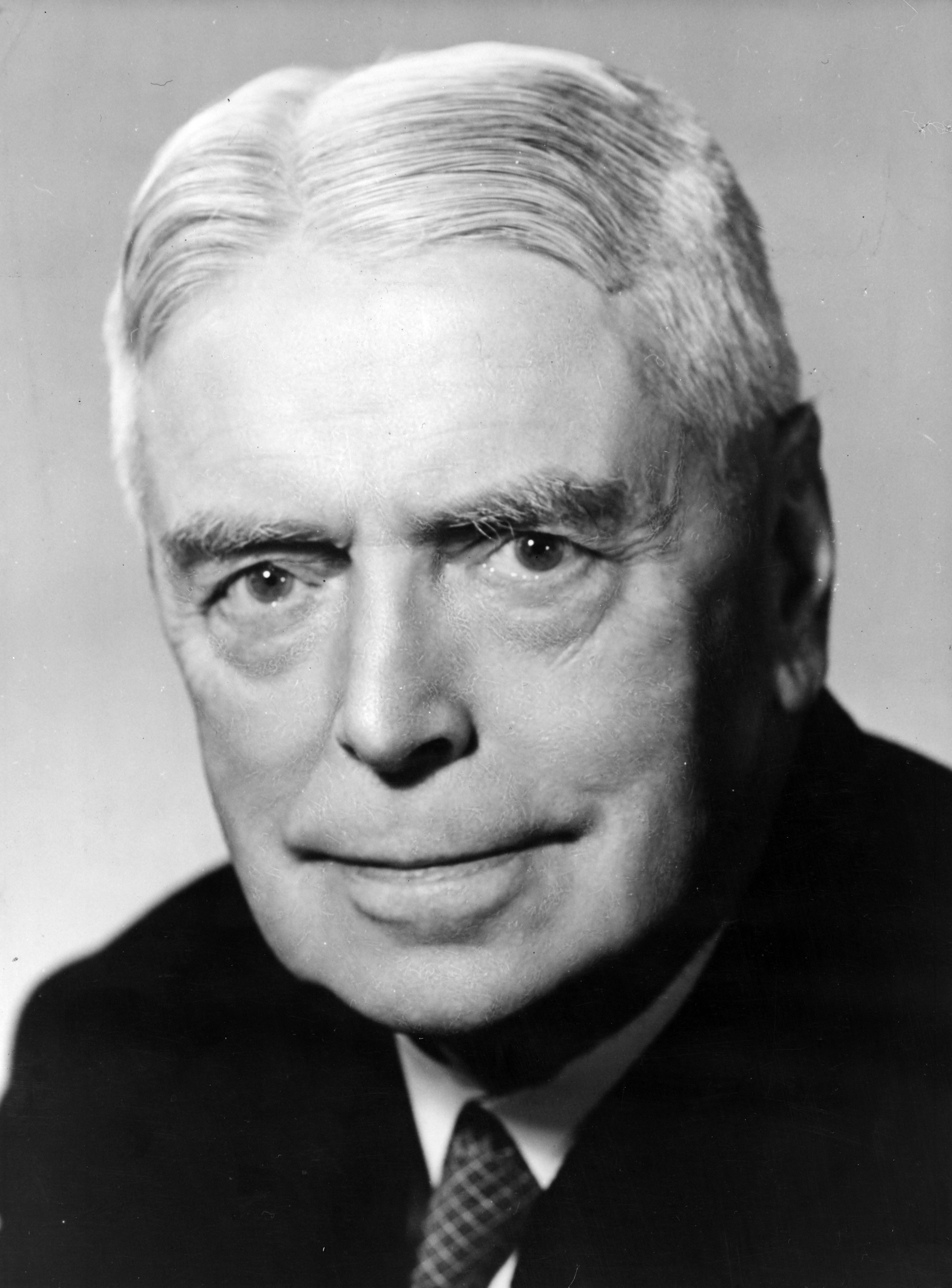
- Portrait, c. 1940s

27th Prime Minister of New Zealand
- In office 12 December 1957 – 12 December 1960
- Monarch: Elizabeth II
- Governor-General: Charles Lyttelton
- Deputy: Jerry Skinner
- Preceded by: Keith Holyoake
- Succeeded by: Keith Holyoake

14th Minister of Foreign Affairs
- In office 12 December 1957 – 12 December 1960
- Prime Minister: Himself
- Preceded by: Tom Macdonald
- Succeeded by: Keith Holyoake

5th Leader of the Labour Party
- In office 17 January 1951 – 31 March 1963
- Deputy: Jerry Skinner; Fred Hackett
- Preceded by: Peter Fraser
- Succeeded by: Arnold Nordmeyer

27th Minister of Finance
- In office 6 December 1935 – 13 December 1949
- Prime Minister: Michael Joseph Savage; Peter Fraser
- Preceded by: Gordon Coates
- Succeeded by: Sidney Holland

35th Minister of Customs
- In office 6 December 1935 – 13 December 1949
- Prime Minister: Michael Joseph Savage; Peter Fraser
- Preceded by: Gordon Coates
- Succeeded by: Charles Bowden

14th President of the Labour Party
- In office 24 April 1935 – 14 April 1936
- Vice President: James Roberts
- Preceded by: Tim Armstrong
- Succeeded by: Clyde Carr

Member of the New Zealand Parliament for Hutt
- In office 18 December 1929 – 4 June 1968
- Preceded by: Thomas Wilford
- Succeeded by: Trevor Young

Personal details
- Born: 12 February 1882 Kidderminster, Worcestershire, England
- Died: 4 June 1968 (aged 86) Lower Hutt, New Zealand
- Party: Labour
- Spouse: Lotty May Eaton (m. 1906; died 1961)
- Children: 4
- Relatives: Stuart Nash (great-grandson)
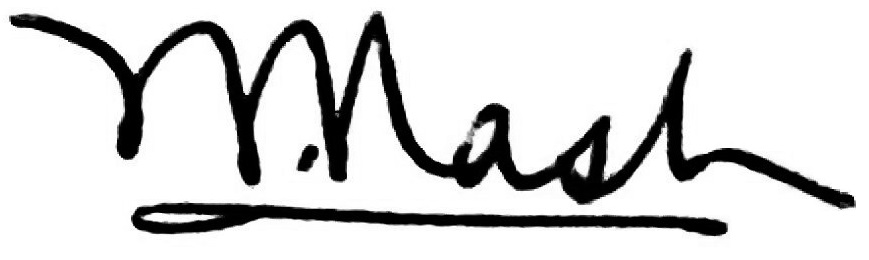
- Signature

Sir Walter Nash GCMG CH PC (12 February 1882 – 4 June 1968) was a New Zealand politician who served as the 27th prime minister of New Zealand in the Second Labour Government from 1957 to 1960. He is noted for his long period of political service, having been associated with the New Zealand Labour Party since its creation.

Nash was born in the West Midlands, England, and is the most recent New Zealand prime minister to be born outside the country. He arrived in New Zealand in 1909, soon joined the original Labour Party, and became a member of the party's executive in 1919. Guided to politics by his beliefs in Anglicanism, Christian socialism and pacifism, he gained a reputation for brilliant ability as an organiser and administrator which compensated for a lack of charisma and bouts of indecisiveness.

Nash was elected to the House of Representatives in the Hutt by-election of 1929. He served as the member of Parliament (MP) for the Hutt electorate for 13 consecutive terms, over a period of 38 years and 168 days. As of 2023, he is the fourth-longest serving MP. Appointed as minister of finance in 1935, Nash guided the First Labour Government's economic recovery programme during the Great Depression and then directed the government's wartime controls. At 14 years he has the longest period of continuous service of any New Zealand minister of finance, and this service included the entire period of World War II. He succeeded Peter Fraser as leader of the Labour Party and leader of the Opposition in 1951. He was from the moderate wing of the Labour Party and was criticised by the left wing of the party for failing to support the strikers during the 1951 Waterfront Dispute, and for not taking stronger action over the controversial exclusion of Māori players from the 1960 rugby tour of South Africa.

In the 1957 election, the Labour Party won a narrow victory and Nash became prime minister. The Second Labour Government's "Black Budget" of 1958, in response to a balance of payments crisis, increased taxes on luxuries such as beer and tobacco. Public hostility toward the budget contributed to Labour's heavy defeat in the 1960 election. Nash was active in international affairs and travelled extensively during his premiership, revising trade terms and supporting aid and development in other nations. Leaving office at 78 years of age, Nash is to date New Zealand's oldest prime minister. He died on 4 June 1968 at the age of 86 while still a serving MP, apparently the oldest person to be a serving MP. He was accorded a state funeral, the first in New Zealand for 18 years.

== Early life ==
Nash was born on 12 February 1882 in Kidderminster, a town in the English county of Worcestershire. He was born into a poor family and his father was an alcoholic. Nash performed well at school and won a scholarship to King Charles I Grammar School but additional costs associated with attending prevented him from accepting. Nash began employment as a clerk, initially with a lawyer in Kidderminster and then at a factory near Birmingham.

On 16 June 1906, Nash married Lottie May Eaton and established a shop. He became highly active in his community, participating in a large number of societies and clubs. He also attended night school to further his education. However, by 1908 problems began to arise. His wife and son were both ill and a daughter died at birth. In addition an economic recession in the following year seriously harmed his business. The family decided to leave England, settling on New Zealand as a destination.

After arriving in Wellington, in May 1909 Nash became secretary to a local tailor. His wife had two more sons. Nash's religious and political beliefs also began to solidify at this point, with the strong Christian faith he received from his mother being merged with a growing belief in socialism. Nash would remain a Christian socialist for the rest of his life, believing that the two components were inseparable. His political opinions were influenced by his friendship with prominent New Zealand socialists such as Michael Joseph Savage, Bob Semple and Harry Holland. Nash also became a committed pacifist. During World War I he made many speeches at the Church of England Men's Society stating his reasons for pacifism were faith based and called for understanding with German and Austrian Christians. Despite anti-German sentiment in New Zealand during the war, Nash allowed a German to stay at his home. Due to his open pacifism and friendship with other anti-war activists such as Holland his mail was scrutinised by police looking for evidence on himself and colleagues for sedition or treason.

Nash's financial situation deteriorated when the tailor's firm that he worked for (and was a shareholder of) declined. Nash and his family moved to Palmerston North where he became a salesman for a wool and cloth merchant. Later he established a tailoring company in New Plymouth along with Bill Besley, a tailor from Stratford, although the business performed poorly.

== Political career ==
=== Early political career ===
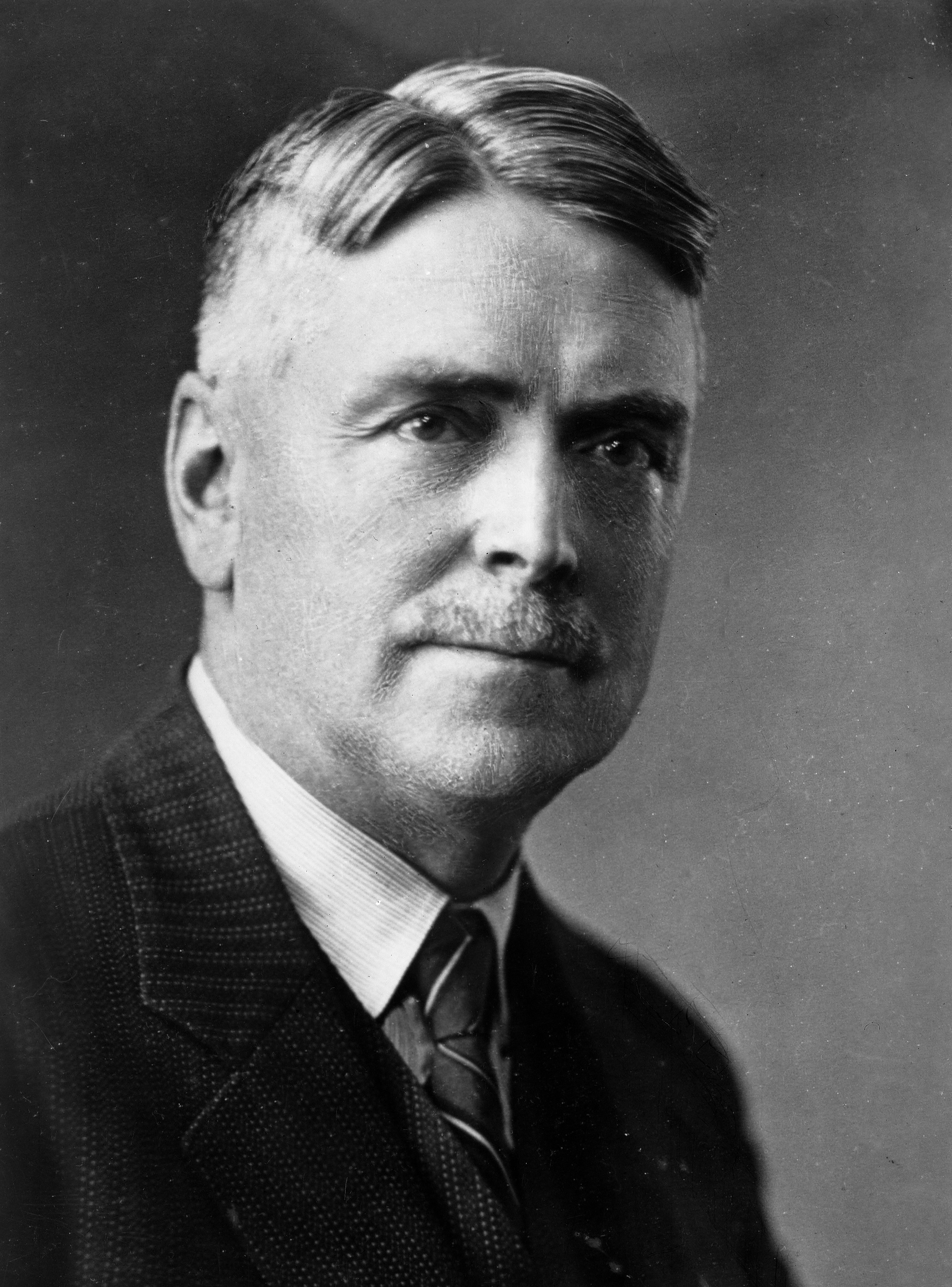
Nash, c. 1920s

Nash had briefly been involved with the first Labour Party, established in 1910, but this association had been interrupted by his financial difficulties. In 1918 however, he helped to establish the New Plymouth branch of the modern Labour Party and he became highly active as secretary of the branch and main organiser for the Labour Party ticket at the 1919 local-body elections. Labour campaigned on borrowing £30,000 to finance council housing which the occupiers were to have a right to purchase, with the rest funded by profits made by the local electric light department. Another pledge was to establish a municipal milk supply. Twenty-six thousand leaflets were printed and distributed by the branch. Nash was a candidate for the borough council himself, but was unsuccessful though did poll the highest of the Labour candidates. The following year Nash was elected to the party's national executive.

In 1920 Nash and his wife travelled to Europe, attending various socialist conferences. When they returned to New Zealand in January 1921, Nash was fined for importing "seditious literature". Despite the reputation that this fine gave him among his fellow socialists, Nash was one of the more moderate members of the Labour Party. In 1922, a year after he had returned to Wellington, Nash was elected national secretary of the Labour Party. After winning the national secretary position he withdrew as Labour's candidate for the New Plymouth seat at the upcoming 1922 election. When he took up the national secretary role he found the party had a total debt of £220. The debt was settled when together with Nash's own loan, John Glover (manager of the Maoriland Worker) lent some £100 interest free.

Nash is often credited with turning the Labour Party into a fully functioning entity by establishing an efficient organisational structure and paying off the party's debts. Following his announcement of "fifty thousand shillings and fifty thousand members in three months" in the Maoriland Worker he worked hard to increase the party's membership which grew from 21,000 in 1919 to 45,000 in 1925. The delegates at Labour's 1922 annual conference voted to establish a permanent national office which Nash was given the responsibility of doing. Having now set up a centralised location to coordinate party activities and election campaigns was a vital step up to Labour becoming a major political party in New Zealand.

As he had been in New Plymouth, Nash became involved in local politics in Wellington. At the 1927 local elections he stood as a Labour candidate for a seat on the Wellington City Council. He polled well but was not successful. Two years later he contested the Wellington mayoralty for Labour at the 1929 election, but was defeated by the incumbent mayor George Troup.

=== Member for Hutt ===
New Zealand Parliament
Years	Term	Electorate	Party
1929–1931	23rd	Hutt	Labour
1931–1935	24th	Hutt	Labour
1935–1938	25th	Hutt	Labour
1938–1943	26th	Hutt	Labour
1943–1946	27th	Hutt	Labour
1946–1949	28th	Hutt	Labour
1949–1951	29th	Hutt	Labour
1951–1954	30th	Hutt	Labour
1954–1957	31st	Hutt	Labour
1957–1960	32nd	Hutt	Labour
1960–1963	33rd	Hutt	Labour
1963–1966	34th	Hutt	Labour
1966–1968	35th	Hutt	Labour

Nash stood for election in the Hutt electorate in the 1925 and 1928 elections, but was not successful until the 1929 by-election. He served the electorate for 13 consecutive terms over a period of 38 years and 168 days which, as of 2023, makes him New Zealand's fourth-longest serving MP. Immediately upon entering Parliament Nash became one of Labour's main finance spokesmen. By 1932 he had moved up to the front bench and had become the senior finance spokesman. After entering Parliament, Nash built a house in the electorate he represented. The house, a modest bungalow in St Albans Grove, was completed in 1930 and he lived in the house the rest of his life.

=== Minister of Finance ===
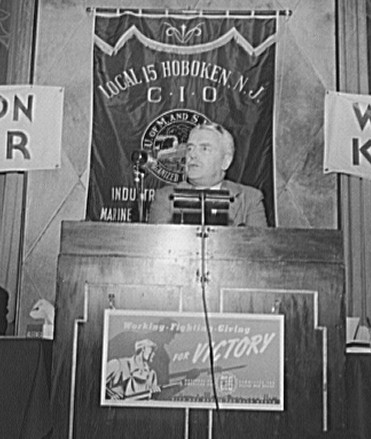
Nash speaking in New York City in September 1942

When Labour, led by Michael Joseph Savage, won the 1935 election Nash was appointed to Cabinet as minister of finance, although he also held a number of more minor positions. His other portfolios were customs, statistics, marketing, revenue and social security. He was ranked third in the First Labour Government, with only Savage and Peter Fraser above him. Nash remained as minister of finance, responsible for the New Zealand Treasury for the next 14 years. As of 2023, he has the longest period of continuous service in that role. Soon after its election the government gave a "Christmas bonus" of £270,000 to the unemployed and needy.

New Zealand's economy was in poor shape at the time of Nash's appointment as finance minister and he was very busy for the early part of his ministerial career. Nash introduced a number of substantial changes, in an attempt to improve the situation. He reintroduced a graduated land tax at high rates. The land tax (which had been rescinded in October 1931) netted an extra £8 million to fund government spending. He also supervised the nationalisation of the Reserve Bank of New Zealand. Although some unemployment persisted, rising export prices helped the government to implement its election policies. The changes in economic policy included restoring wage cuts, expanding pensions, guaranteeing farmers' prices and revaluation of the currency. In 1936 Nash departed for England to conduct trade negotiations. The negotiations were only partially successful, with an agreement reached over New Zealand's meat prices for beef and lamb exports. He also visited other European capitals, particularly Berlin and Moscow, to determine whether there was scope for trade agreements there. He reached a bilateral trade deal with Germany to export butter there. He also went to Copenhagen to study the Danish system of exchange controls, and had further fruitless trade talks in both Paris and Amsterdam.

After returning to New Zealand he became involved in disputes within the Labour Party about economic policy. In particular he was heavily criticised by supporters of the Social Credit movement who wanted their views adopted as Labour Party policy. Nash was also attacked by the more radical socialists in the party who saw Nash's pragmatic economic policies as too moderate. However, Nash was supported by both Savage and Fraser and emerged relatively unscathed. He gained the additional responsibility of implementing Labour's social security plan. Nash himself had limited involvement in the formulation of Labour's economic reform policies, however he was largely responsible for putting them into effect, with other ministers relying on him for his attention to detail.

Immediately following Labour's re-election at the 1938 general election New Zealand experienced an exchange crisis with its reserves of sterling funds falling. The orthodox economic response given to the government to call up overdrafts and cut spending to reduce demand and increase unemployment was rejected by the government. Nash instead stated the government would react by introducing exchange controls and import selection which he said in January 1939 would allow the country to maintain its living standards while ensuring the country could live within its income. He was already well familiar with exchange controls systems, having studied the Danish system while in Europe in 1937 and had wished to implement them in New Zealand earlier. Other colleagues (such as John A. Lee and Mark Woolf Silverstone) felt the main reason this decision had been delayed was to not frighten voters too soon ahead of the election with radical economic repositioning. Prime Minister Savage informed the public that exchange controls were introduced to 'insulate' the country from unfair overseas competition and to encourage industrial development locally.

Nash's proposals to control primary produce marketing and restrict imports were strongly criticised abroad. They conflicted with agreements at 1932's British Empire Economic Conference and were labelled as 'economic totalitarianism' by a British Department of Overseas Trade memorandum. In the immediate period before the exchange controls system could be established, borrowing was necessary. Nash returned to Britain in April 1939 to seek loans and to reassure the British government (in vain) that existing British exports would not be harmed. He spent over two months in negotiations with hostile officials who were fearful of losing New Zealand as an export market. Nash attempted to compromise suggesting that British manufacturers could take advantage of import regulations by establishing branch factories in New Zealand. This proposal, that British manufacturers should export themselves rather than their products, was rejected. It was a method by which Nash thought New Zealand could industrialise with minimal need for borrowing. Nash eventually secured a loan of £16 million, but it was subject to very harsh terms, requiring repayment in five annual instalments. Many British newspapers wrote that the terms were "impossibly onerous; indeed blackmailing."

With loans secured Nash sailed home, stopping in Washington, D.C., en route and met with President Franklin D. Roosevelt to discuss defence arrangements in the event of a war. Several days later war was declared between Britain (and New Zealand) against Germany. The British government cabled that it wished to purchase New Zealand's entire exportable surplus of meat. The following day they likewise requested to buy New Zealand's entire exports of dairy produce. Nash took some quiet ironical satisfaction that the government that had been so hostile to his policies and negotiated so unfairly was now so desperate for the bulk sales it had earlier denied. Over the next few months, New Zealand's sterling reserves built up quickly and economic stability was restored. The country was then able to repay the loan from Britain.

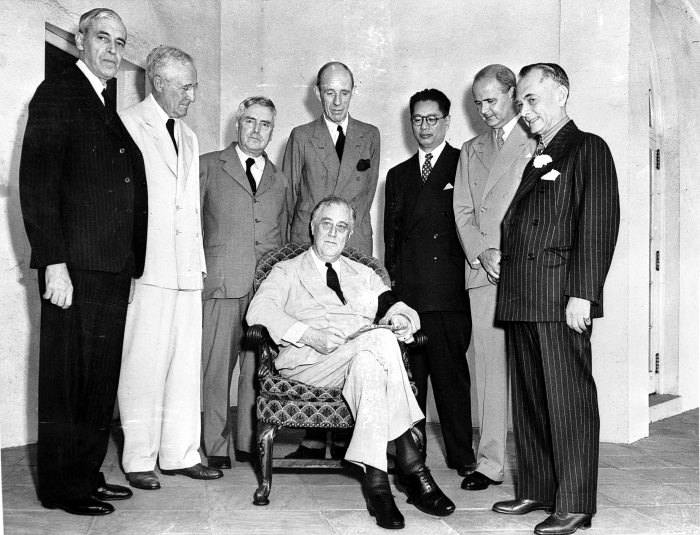
Nash (centre-left) at the Pacific War Council, 1942

The first years of World War II were difficult for the Labour Party, because Savage was seriously ill. Further problems were caused by John A. Lee, a Labour Party member who launched strong attacks on its economic policy. Lee was particularly vicious towards Savage and Nash. Peter Fraser became prime minister after Savage's death and Lee was expelled. Nash reluctantly set aside his earlier pacifist beliefs during World War II. Unlike World War I, he deemed this war necessary and inevitable in any case because of the overtly aggressive actions by Germany. Other pacifists were critical of Nash for his change in stance labelling him a hypocrite. Nash retorted that other attempts at peace had been tried and failed, and defeating Germany and its allies by force was the only option left.

Taxes were raised considerably to pay for the war. Income tax in particular was targeted rising from £4.5 million in 1935–36 to £16.5 million in 1941–42. Expenditure for social security was extended by Nash for the poor to offset the cost of the extra wartime taxes. Pension payments were raised in 1941 and the government began to subsidise the prices of basic goods such as bread, sugar and coal. The family benefit was extended to second children in 1940 and to all in 1941 for all families earning less than £5 per week. From May to September 1941 Nash was acting prime minister when Fraser visited New Zealand troops in North Africa. During 1941 the government's internal debt rose by £11.8 million to £26 million but while Fraser was abroad he negotiated so that the British government would pay the costs of New Zealand troops serving overseas leading to New Zealand's overseas debt reducing. This compensated for the rise in internal debt.

Nash was appointed minister from New Zealand in the United States as New Zealand's diplomatic representative in the United States in 1942, but he frequently returned to Wellington to fulfil his role as finance minister. As a result of Nash's frequent absences, Geoffrey Cox, the first secretary at the New Zealand Embassy, was chargé d'affaires for 11 out of the 21 months that he was posted to Washington. Nash was difficult to work for; he was unable to delegate, accumulated files before making a decision, and was inconsiderate of staff.

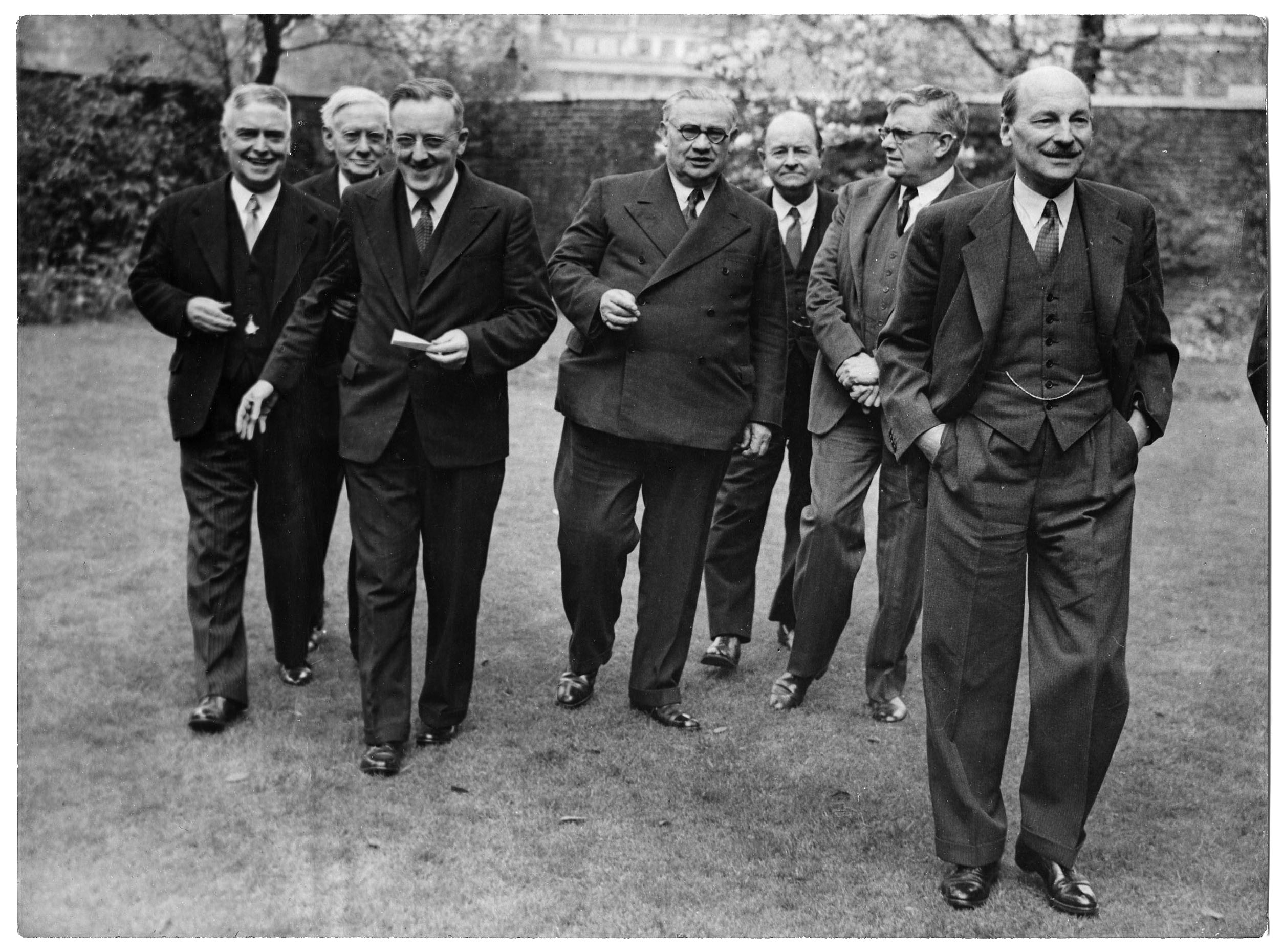
Nash (leftmost), attending the Commonwealth Prime Ministers' Conference as deputy prime minister, 1946

At the end of the war Nash attended the conferences to create the United Nations and also recommended that New Zealand join the International Monetary Fund. He also travelled as New Zealand's representative to several major post-war international conferences concerned with reconstruction, (such as the Bretton Woods Conference and the initial 1948 General Agreement on Tariffs and Trade).

By the time of the 1949 election, the Labour government had become increasingly unpopular, partly as a result of industrial strife and inflation. The election was won by the National Party, led by Sidney Holland.

=== Leader of the Opposition ===
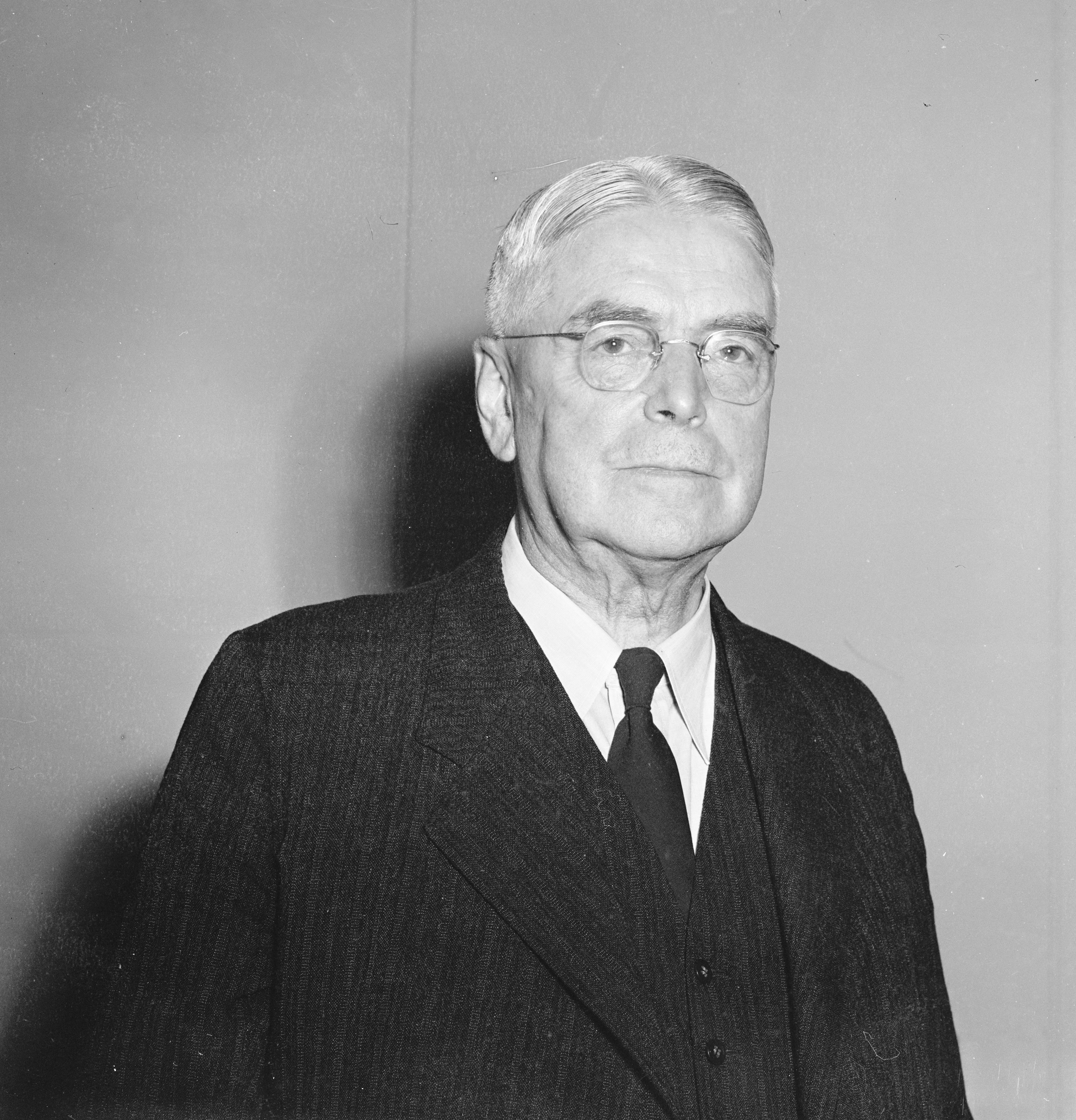
Nash in 1951

Fraser died shortly after the 1949 election and Nash was elected leader of the Labour Party unopposed. Nash was seen as the likely replacement for Fraser, but his succession was not assured. As acting leader he deliberately brought the leadership election to before the imminent by-election for Fraser's seat of Brooklyn. The Brooklyn by-election was to be contested by former cabinet minister and party president Arnold Nordmeyer (who had lost his seat in the 1949 election) and thus Nordmeyer was unable to contest the leadership, as only elected members of the caucus were eligible to stand. Nash's decision on the leadership election date caused an argument in caucus, being seen by some as self-motivated, although eventually MPs voted to proceed with the early vote by a majority of two.

The first major test of Nash's leadership came with the 1951 waterfront dispute, where major strikes were damaging the economy. Labour's position on the matter was seen as indecisive—the party was condemned by many workers for giving them insufficient support but at the same time was condemned by the business community for being "soft" on the communist-influenced unions. Infamously he said "We are not for the waterside workers, and we are not against them" when addressing a large rally in Auckland on 13 May 1951. He was ridiculed for this stance for many years from National, unions and media. Labour suffered badly in the snap election that Holland called in September 1951 to reaffirm his mandate. The scale of Labour's election loss soon put Nash's leadership under pressure.

As Leader of the Opposition Nash is not generally regarded as having been a success. His primary talent appeared to have been in organisation and finance, and not in the inspirational leadership that Savage and Fraser had provided. He was also seen as too slow in coming to decisions. In 1954 several MPs attempted an abortive coup to remove the 71-year-old Nash as leader. They included Rex Mason, Bill Anderton and Arnold Nordmeyer. Nash was told by Mason that a number of members had complained about the leadership of the party to him and that Mason thought that the majority wanted a new leader. In 1954 a majority of the caucus was in favour of a new leader but pressure from the unions and continued support from Party branches allowed Nash to survive the subsequent vote.

The negative press from the leadership challenge was unhelpful to Labour's position, but Nash rebounded well heading into the 1954 election. He fought a strong campaign that led to a gain of five seats and virtually levelled the popular vote with National, with a margin of only 0.2% behind. The advent of the new Social Credit Party (which won 11.2% of the vote, but no seats) was seen as a spoiler and it was claimed by Nash that Social Credit denied Labour victory by diminishing the two-party swing. The gains made in the election were seen as sufficient to justify Nash retaining the leadership, despite some murmurs of a surprise challenge to him by either his deputy Jerry Skinner or Nordmeyer. Nash's leadership was also bolstered by the talent and energy of new Labour MPs who joined the caucus after the election.

As the National government began to grow more unpopular, Labour regained some of its earlier dynamism. In the 1957 election the party won a narrow victory—41 seats to 39— assisted by its promises of tax rebates and the abolition of compulsory military training. At the age of 75, Nash became prime minister, heading the Second Labour Government.

=== Prime minister (1957–1960) ===
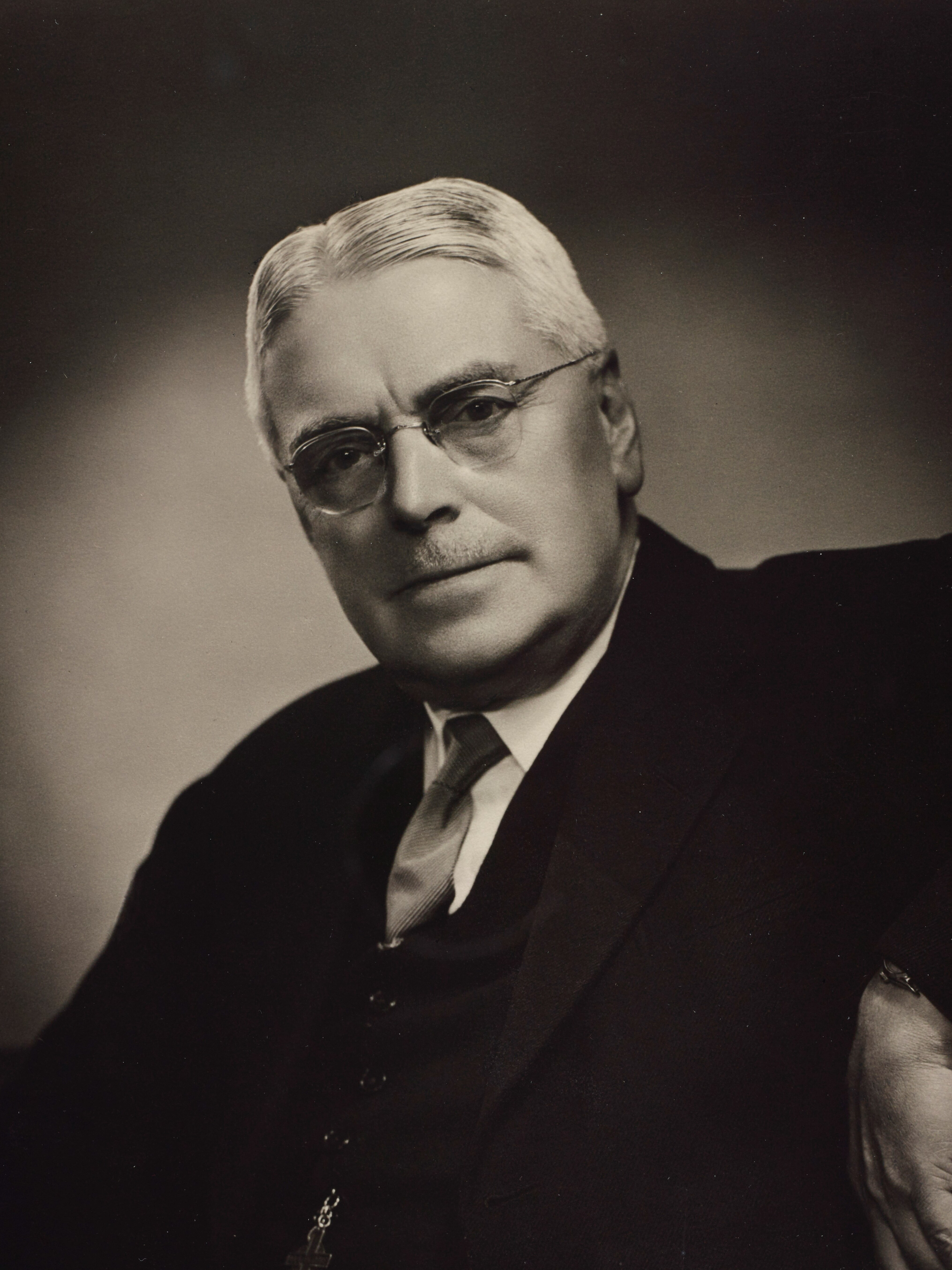
- Premiership of Walter Nash; 12 December 1957 – 12 December 1960
- Monarch: Elizabeth II
- Cabinet: Second Labour Government of New Zealand
- Party: New Zealand Labour Party
- Election: 1957
- Appointed by: Charles Lyttelton

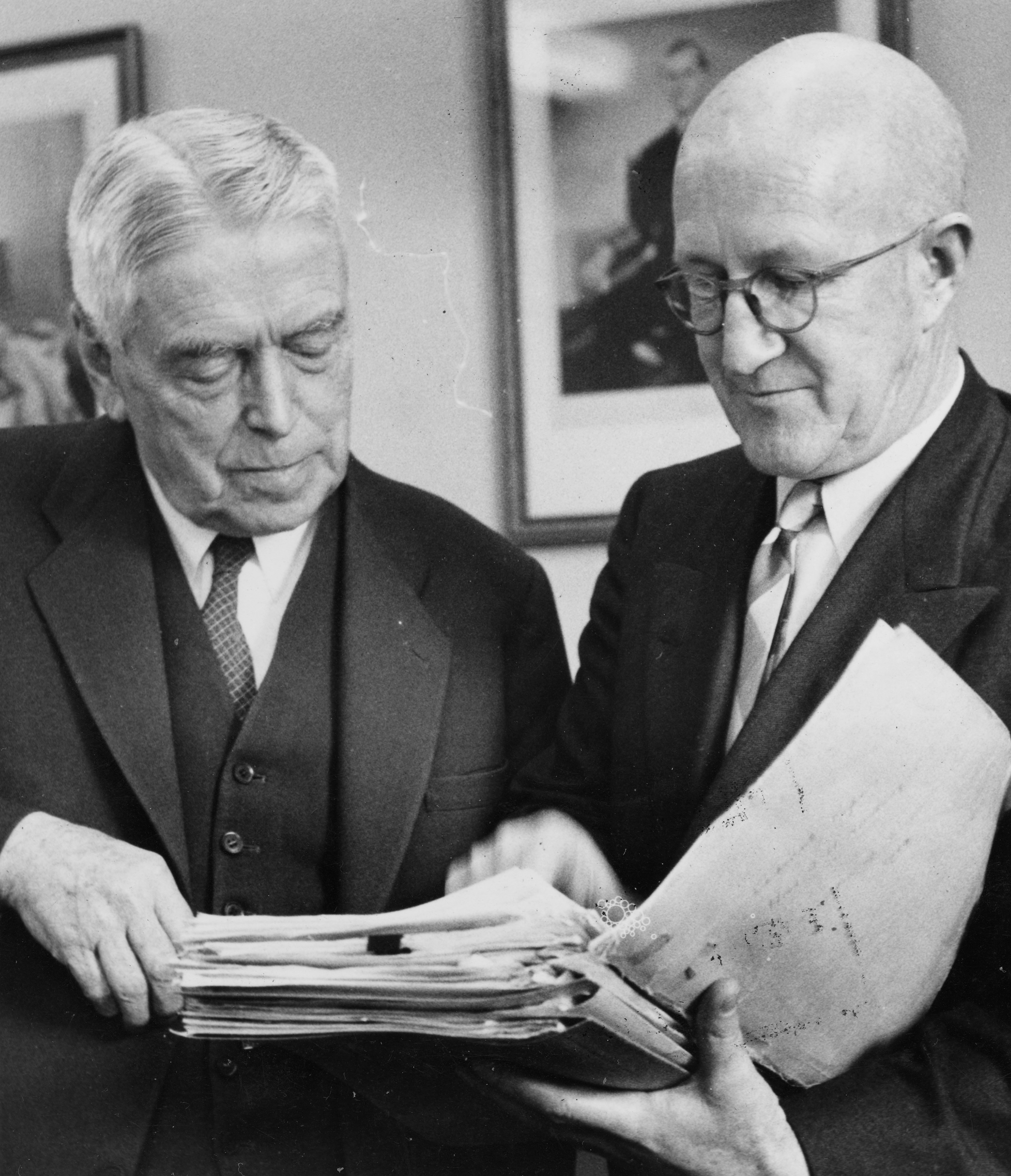
Nash and his Finance Minister Arnold Nordmeyer

Nash appointed himself as minister of foreign affairs, minister of Maori affairs and minister of statistics. Immediately upon taking office the Second Labour Government found the country's financial situation was much worse than the previous government had admitted. The balance of payments was a serious concern. Nash decided that drastic measures would be necessary to bring the situation back under control. These measures resulted in the so-called "Black Budget", presented by Arnold Nordmeyer the new minister of finance. The budget included significant tax increases and generated widespread public anger. This was fuelled by the National Party claiming that Nash and Nordmeyer were exaggerating the extent of the problem. The fact that the extra taxes were largely on petrol, cigarettes and beer contributed to the image of Nash's government as miserly. While the public and the opposition were scolding of the budget decisions, it was praised by economists for financial discipline and its effectiveness in directly addressing the problem. The situation was exacerbated by Nash's frequent absences from the country, leaving Nordmeyer and other Labour ministers to defend the government's policies by themselves. Nash's habit for accumulating paperwork had not abated and the tables in his office were said to "groan" under the weight of files that had been left awaiting a decision to be made. During his overseas trips, public servants would eagerly go through his office and dig through the "cemetery" of unattended piles of paperwork, retrieving them to pass them on the appropriate ministers for actions to take place.

Nash's focus shifted from his previous interests of finance and social welfare to external affairs. His biographer Keith Sinclair explained that "for Nash, by 1958, the great moral issues were not poverty and social security at home but world affairs, peace and war. He meant to make whatever contribution he could to guiding the world to wiser and more moral courses." He was also well regarded by his peers for his knowledge on geopolitical matters. Australian foreign minister Richard Casey acknowledged Nash as one of the few world leaders who had any broad and balanced grasp of world affairs: "Mr. Nash spoke with authority and other world statesmen were ready to listen; his views were well informed and liberal and, although occasionally he seemed to be lost in visionary speculations, he arrived in the end at a practical, hard-headed and courageous attitude. Nearly all New Zealanders, whatever their party, were proud to have Mr. Nash representing them overseas."

Nash's main effort in foreign affairs was to revise the trade and tariff terms of the 1932 Ottawa agreement, in 1958. He was also a strong supporter of the Colombo Plan and visited many of the New Zealand-funded Colombo Plan projects in Asia and attended the Colombo Plan conference at Yogyakarta, Indonesia. The plan was one of his main interests in foreign policy, with aid and economic development for impoverished peoples appealing to his principles. The Nash government also made progress towards the independence of Western Samoa. Nash had previously shown interest in Samoa during the 1929 uprising when he collected statistics to evidence Labour's criticism of the New Zealand government's administration of Samoa. Following the work by the Nash government, Samoa gained its independence in 1962.

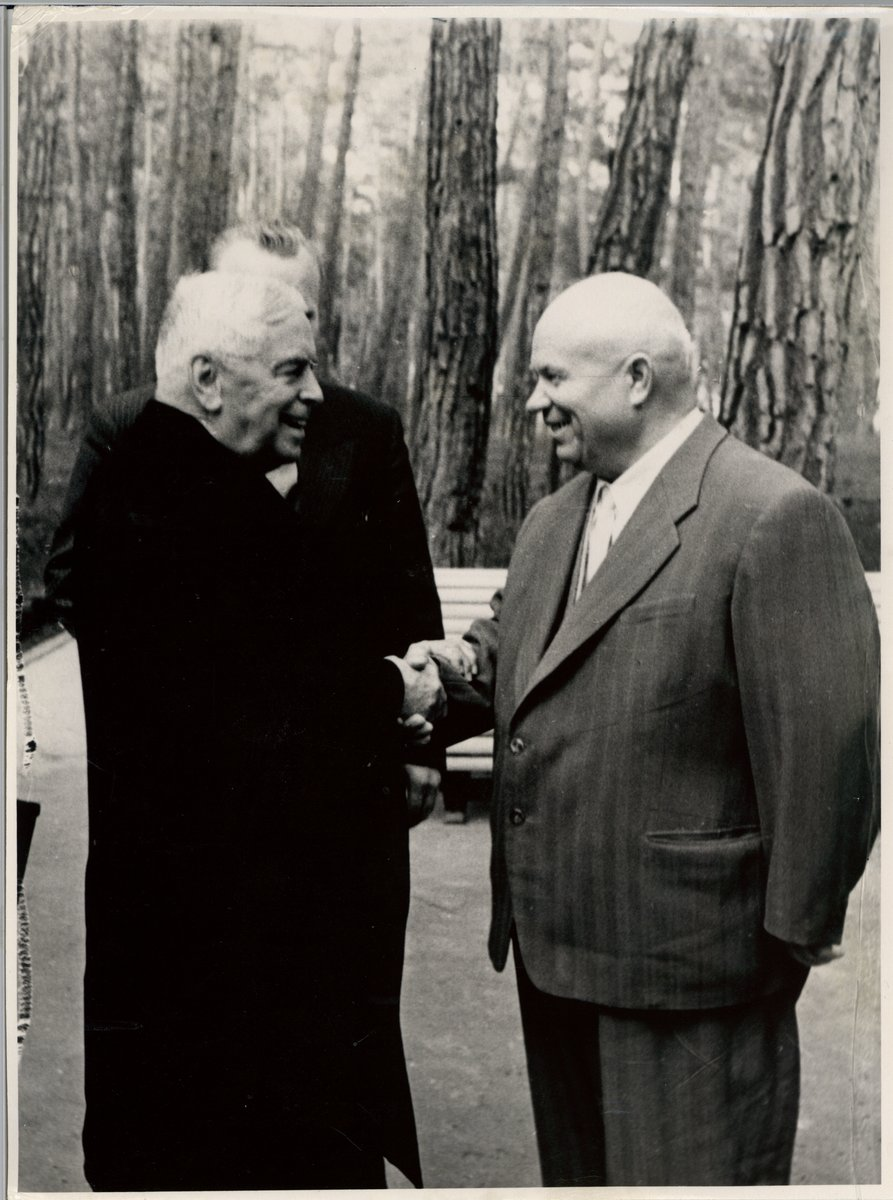
Nash meets Soviet leader Nikita Khrushchev in Gagra, Georgia, 20 April 1960

In April 1960, Nash and his secretary of foreign affairs, Alister McIntosh, visited the Soviet Union where they met Soviet leader Nikita Khrushchev and Soviet Foreign Minister Andrei Gromyko. Nash proposed that the 1958 moratorium on nuclear testing—observed by the Soviet Union, the US and the UK—be formalised into a permanent ban. However, the Soviet Union resumed tests in 1961. (A partial ban was achieved in 1963.)

In 1960, Nash was criticised for failing to act in the controversy over the rugby tour of South Africa. At the time, South Africa had an apartheid government. On the insistence of the South Africans the New Zealand team included no Māori players, prompting a petition against the tour supported by almost 10% of New Zealanders. Opposition to the tour was led by the Citizens All Black Tour Association (CABTA) in whose view the exclusion of Māori from a national team was a gross act of racial discrimination. Nash had long been an outspoken critic of apartheid and in 1958, after he became prime minister, New Zealand voted against apartheid for the first time at the United Nations. As Nash had personally denounced racism for most of his life it was expected that he would side with the protesters, but he did not. He refused to step in, saying that the matter was for the rugby authorities to decide. In an April 1960 speech Nash defended the decision of the New Zealand Rugby Union stating that it would be unfair to expect Māori to visit South Africa as they would be sure to experience racial discrimination there and also argued that ostracising apartheid would merely accentuate bitterness in South Africa. The decision to exclude Māori from the team to tour South Africa was widely reported and condemned in other countries, having an adverse effect on New Zealand's international standing. The domestic political effect was more benign because the opposition National Party was also reluctant to see government interference in the tour. After the tour had ended Nash told the Rugby Union that in future tours it would be desirable for South Africa to accept Māori to avoid a repetition of the controversy. New Zealand did not tour South Africa again until 1970 when Māori players were included.

Against expectations Nash did not appoint a Māori as minister of Māori affairs. Instead, he appointed himself, along with an associate minister Eruera Tirikatene, who had been spokesperson in the portfolio when in opposition. Historian Keith Sinclair wrote that Nash either had reservations about Tirikatene's ability or was nervous that a Māori appointed as minister of Māori affairs might favour his own iwi. A previous minister Āpirana Ngata had been accused of this, in a well-remembered scandal. In any case, following Fraser's example, Nash believed that the best way to show government commitment to Māori was to lend the mana of the office of prime minister to the portfolio. Nash often spoke on marae, frequently repeating his belief that "there were no inferior or superior races". Nash was concerned at the fragmentation of Māori land interests and appointed a Public Service Commissioner, Jack Hunn, to act as Secretary for Māori Affairs and "get an accounting of Maori assets and see what we can do with them". This resulted in the famous and contentious 'Hunn report' on the problems and future of Māori which was completed in August 1960. Nash was preoccupied with winning the coming election, and told Hunn that he would not have time to study it until after the election. The report was left unread and was not implemented until early 1961, when it was published by his successor as Minister of Māori affairs, Ralph Hanan. The Hunn report became the basis of National's policy, to the frustration of Nash.

In the 1960 election, Labour was defeated by the National Party and Nash became leader of the Opposition once again. Nash is the only Labour leader who has served as leader of the Opposition both before and after his tenure as prime minister.

== Later life and career ==
By late 1960, Nash was nearly eighty years old. Privately he admitted to confidantes that he had noticed his hearing and memory had deteriorated. The death of his wife in 1961 also took its toll. Gradually, calls for him to retire grew more frequent. Nash, however, refused to step down, partly because of a desire to continue his work, and partly due to a reluctance to see Arnold Nordmeyer succeed him. Initially Nash was planning to announce his retirement as leader at Labour's 1962 party conference to clear the way for his deputy Jerry Skinner. By this time the media and public were widely anticipating Skinner to lead Labour at the 1963 election. After Skinner's sudden death (only a week before the 1962 conference) Nash had been forced to change his plans. The media speculated that Skinner had died with the knowledge that the party leadership would soon be his and that the caucus had already approved of his succession, however Nash strongly denied the suggestion. Skinner was replaced by Fred Hackett, but Hackett also died before Nash's retirement. By June 1962 Nash told the caucus that he would resign at the end of the year unless caucus requested otherwise. At the beginning of the final caucus meeting of the year Nash told caucus that he would resign at a caucus meeting in February and he would not be a candidate for re-election. In February 1963 Nash finally retired as leader of the Labour Party and Nordmeyer was chosen to replace him. Nash was the first Labour leader who did not die in office.

Nash was one of the few New Zealand prime ministers who remained in Parliament a long time after losing power. He became the elder statesman of the house, and was frequently referred to in the press as the "grand old man" of New Zealand politics. He continued to speak frequently on foreign affairs and still travelled abroad regularly. In 1963 he went to a Commonwealth Parliamentary Conference in Kuala Lumpur. In January 1964 at the age of 81 (to widespread astonishment) he travelled to Antarctica, flying to McMurdo Sound in an American research plane. It was widely reported in newspapers, claiming that he was the oldest man to have reached the South Pole. In 1966 he sailed to England for a three-month holiday with his sister Emily, his first non-parliamentary visit since 1909.

Despite supporting the government decision in 1963 to send a small non-combatant advisory force to South Vietnam, Nash opposed any military involvement in Vietnam. He became active in the protest movement against the Vietnam War, and denounced the bombing of North Vietnam by the United States. He spoke at many teach-ins on the subject around New Zealand's university campuses where he was well received. An old colleague, Ormond Wilson, said that he "had never heard Walter so clear about an issue". Nash had become unpopular with the left wing because of his responses to the 1951 waterfront dispute and the 1960 rugby tour to South Africa, but his outspokenness in opposition to the war did a great deal to restore his reputation. Nash believed that Labour's failure to win the 1966 general election was because of its principled anti-Vietnam war policy, despite voters preferring Labour's economic policy to National's.

== Death and state funeral ==
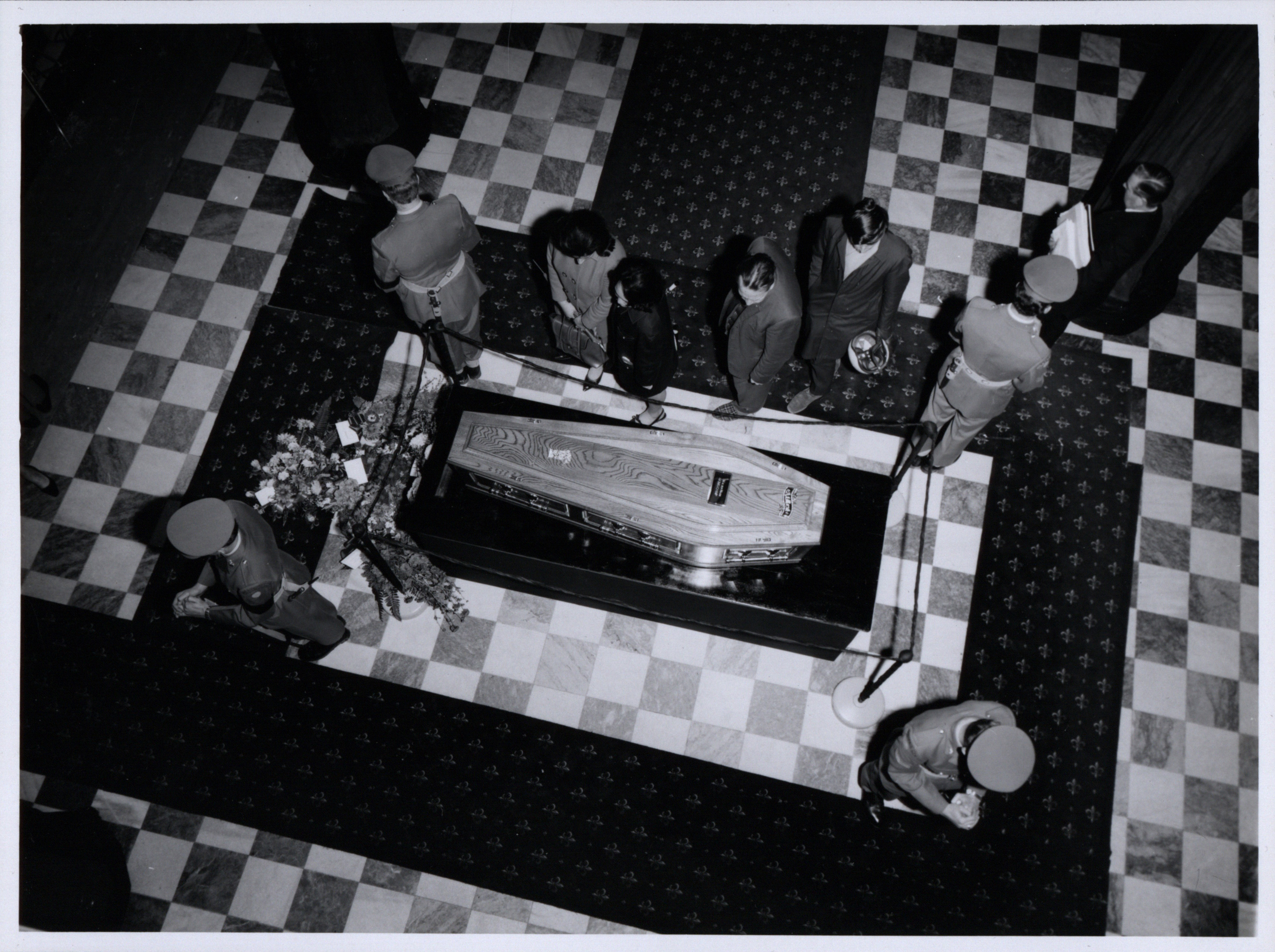
Nash's state funeral

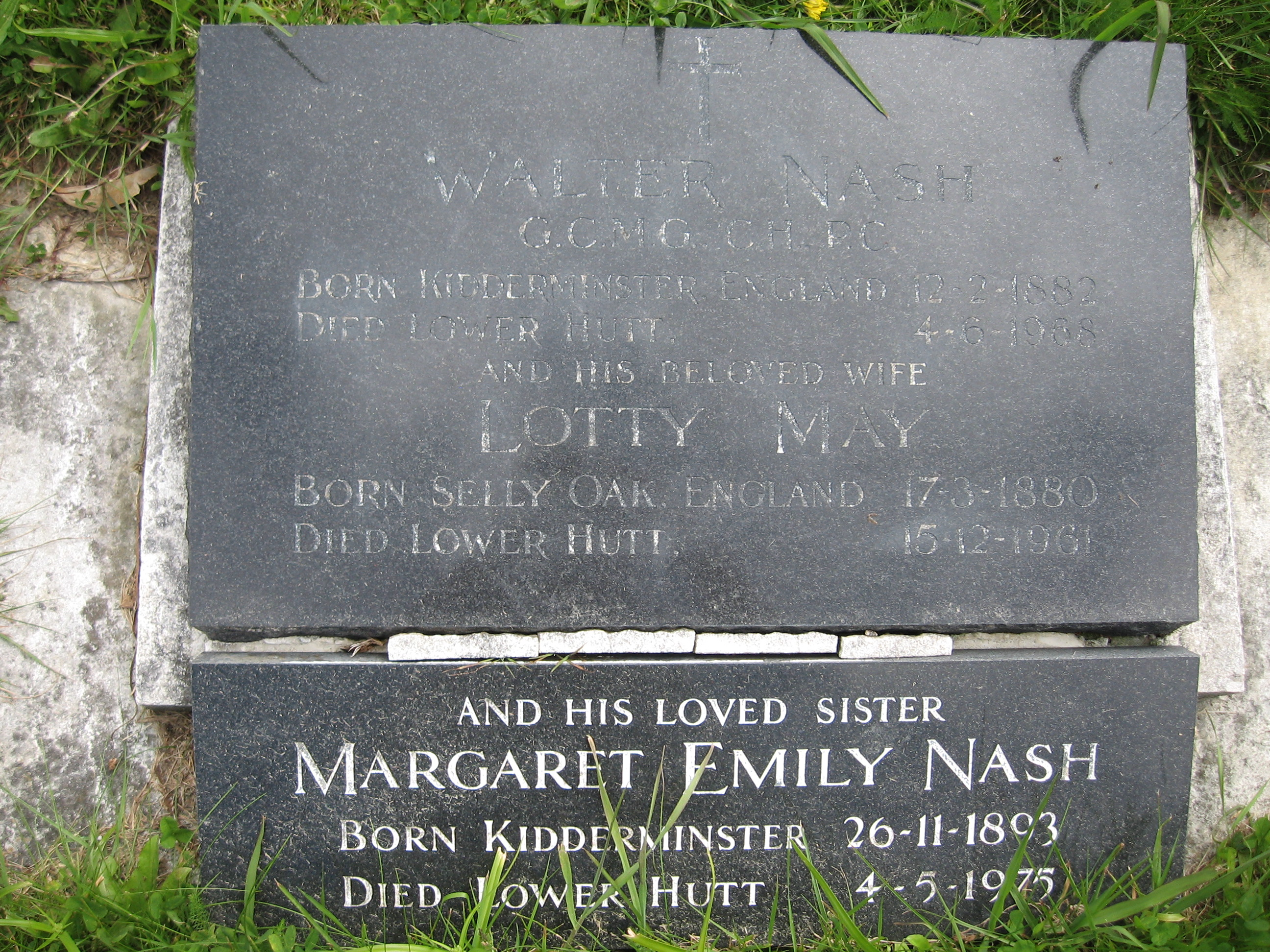
Gravestone in Karori Cemetery, Wellington

In late 1966 he spent three weeks in hospital for treatment on his veins following a demanding travel schedule in that year's election campaign. In mid-May 1968 he was taken to Hutt Hospital for "observation and rest" and a few days later he had a heart attack. He died on 4 June 1968. At his death he was eulogised positively for his career contributions, particularly in his time as finance minister.

His body lay in state at Parliament House, Wellington, and he was awarded a state funeral, the first since Fraser's in 1950. The funeral was held at St James' Church of England, Lower Hutt, on 6 June 1968. It was broadcast on television, the first funeral in New Zealand to be televised. He was buried in Karori Cemetery alongside his wife. Funds for a children's ward at a hospital in Quy Nhon, Vietnam, were raised to serve as a memorial to him. It fitted with a suggestion of his years earlier that New Zealand's contribution to the Vietnam War should be providing "hospitals rather than artillery".

At the time of his death Nash was still a serving MP, though he had already indicated that he intended to retire at the 1969 general election. At 86 years old he is apparently the oldest ever person to be a serving New Zealand MP. His death triggered a by-election which was won by Trevor Young.

== Honours and awards ==
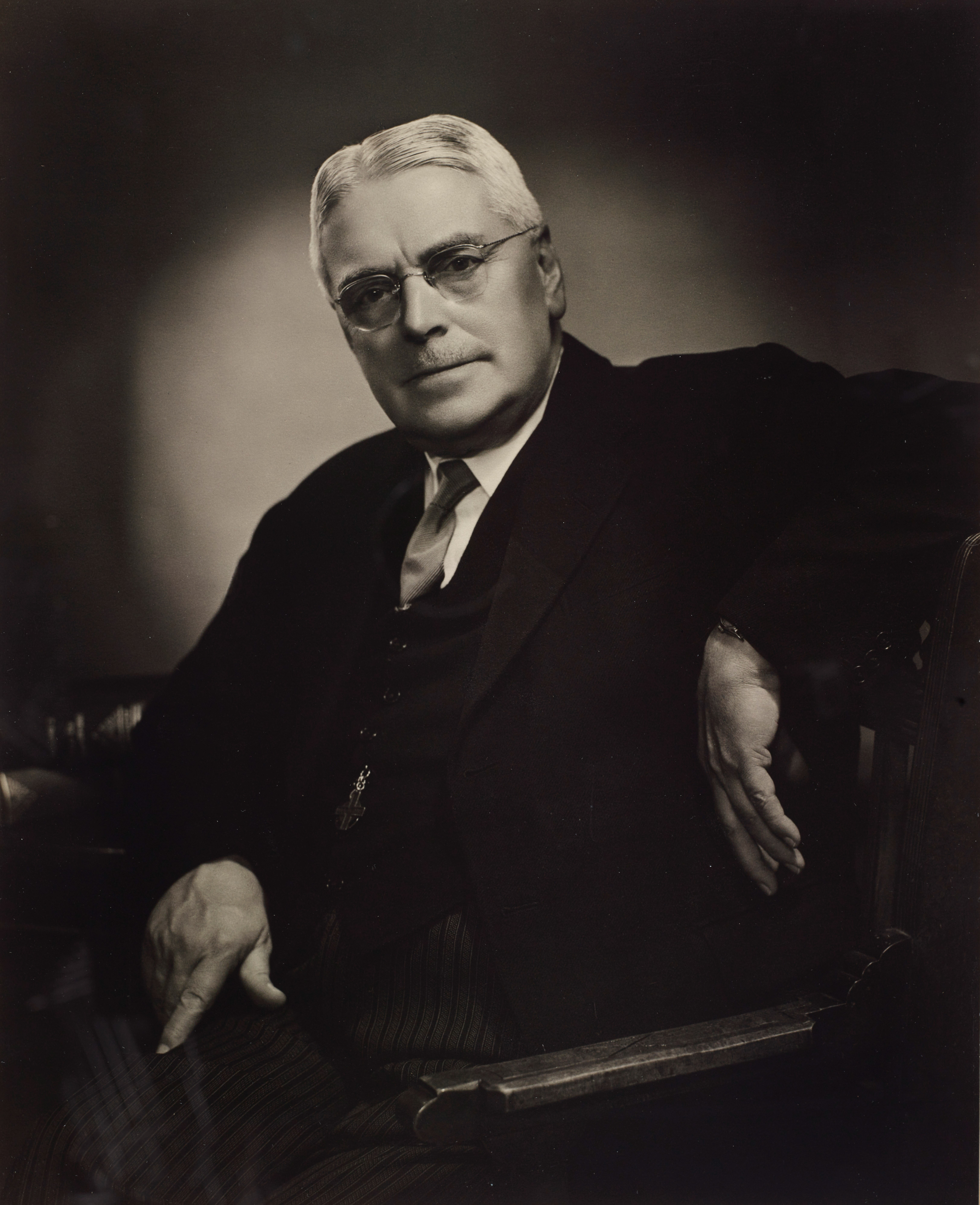
Official portrait of Nash, c. 1950s, at Te Papa

In 1935 Nash was awarded the King George V Silver Jubilee Medal. In 1946 he was appointed to the Privy Council, and in 1953 he was awarded the Queen Elizabeth II Coronation Medal. He was appointed a Member of the Order of the Companions of Honour in the 1959 Queen's Birthday Honours and in the 1965 Queen's Birthday Honours he was made a Knight Grand Cross of the Order of St Michael and St George. It took him two years to decide whether he would accept a knighthood in conformity with the principles of the Labour Party. After discussing it first with Nordmeyer and then the party executive he accepted, though he twice declined a life peerage and seat in the House of Lords. In 1957 he also received the highest distinction of the Scout Association of Japan, the Golden Pheasant Award. In 1963 he was awarded an honorary Doctorate of Laws by Victoria University of Wellington.

== Honorific eponyms ==
A number of streets and public facilities have been named in honour of Nash, in various towns in New Zealand as well as his birthplace of Kidderminster in England. These include:

- Nash Road, Mount Roskill, Auckland
- In Taitā, Lower Hutt
  - Nash Street
  - Walter Nash Centre
  - Walter Nash Park
  - Walter Nash Stadium
- Walter Nash Avenue, Kawerau
- Nash Street, New Plymouth
- Walter Nash Place, Whanganui
- Walter Nash Road East, Kidderminster

== Personal life ==
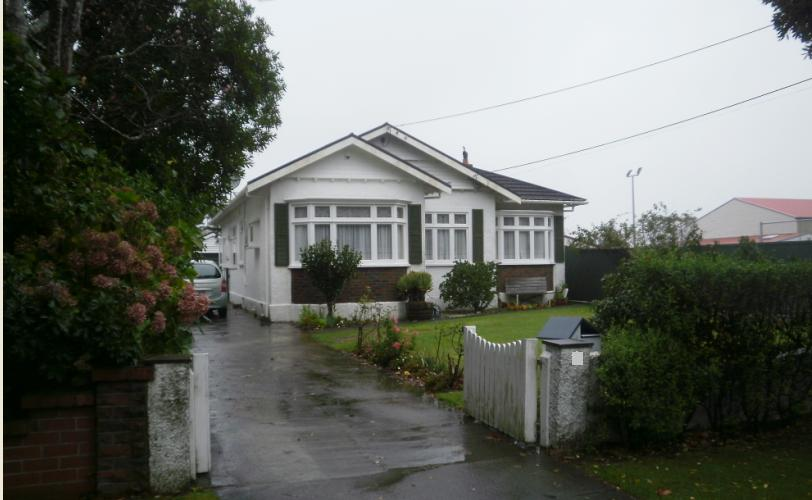
Nash's house of 38 years at 14 St Albans Grove, Woburn, Lower Hutt

Nash was a cricket enthusiast and played village cricket for the Selly Oak Cricket Club, Birmingham. His interest extended to statistics and he could recite the average scores of many famous cricketers of the day by memory. In his youth Nash was interested in Christian theology. He was an assiduous Anglican church service attendee all his life, but overall held very basic views of Christianity. Likewise he did not believe that Christianity was the only true religion or path and believed in religious tolerance. From the 1930s he was a patron and/or president of sixty-six clubs and societies. They included tennis, boating, cricket, cycling, boxing and basketball clubs as well as amateur actors, Boy Scouts, Red Cross and the Anglican Boys' Home Society.

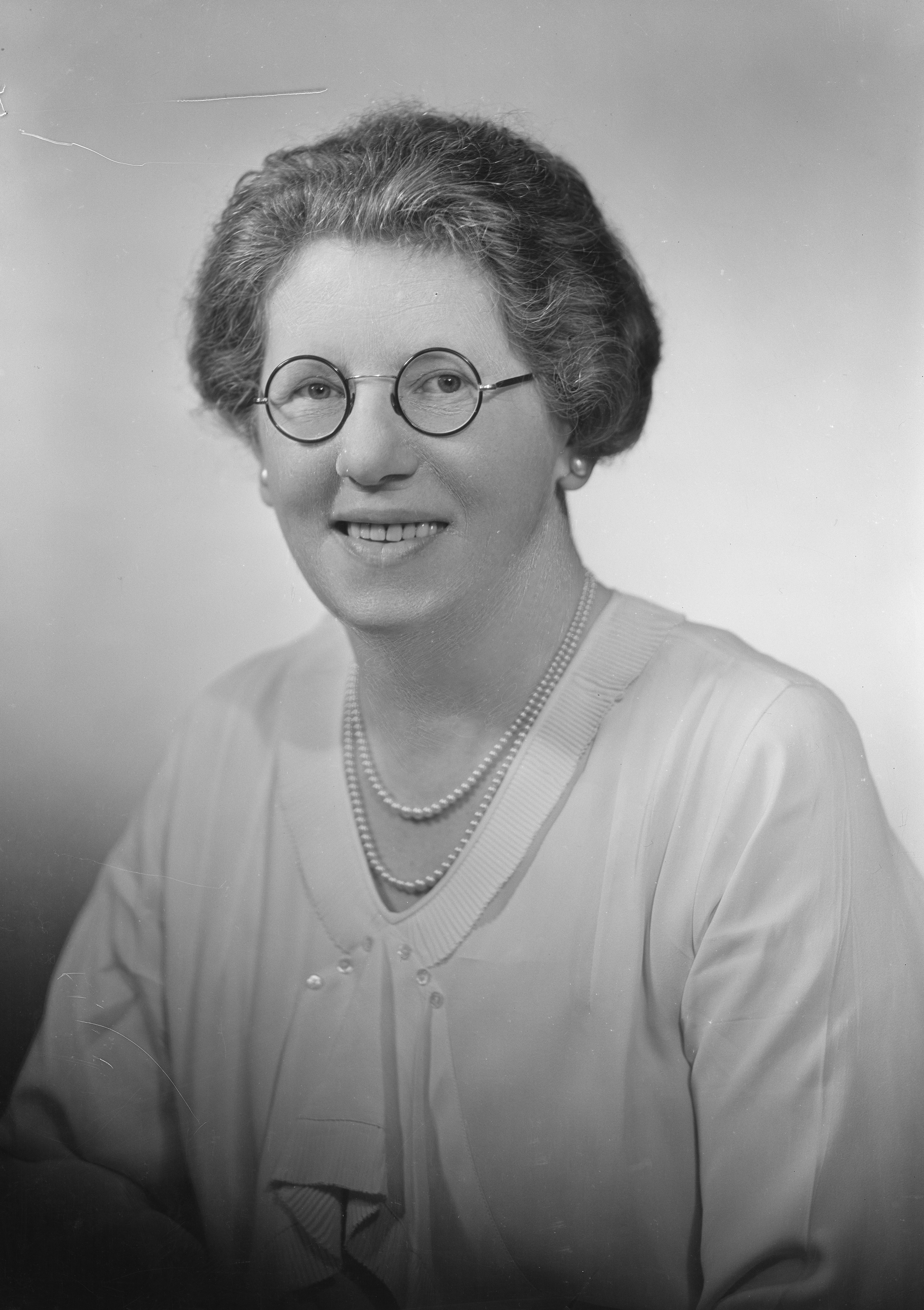
Lotty Nash

He met his wife, Lotty May Eaton, through a mutual friend in the Selly Oak Post Office where she was the head assistant. Lotty was less serious-minded than her husband, and had a natural exuberance which made her good company and an entertaining hostess. Their first child was a son, followed by a daughter who died shortly after birth. After moving to New Zealand two more sons were born. Nash was also a voracious reader and was rarely seen during his leisure time without a book in hand. He disliked swimming, unlike his wife, and he would read whenever he accompanied her while she was swimming.

Nash did not smoke and consumed alcohol in moderation. There are several anecdotes about Nash getting orange juice laced with gin at receptions. When Nordmeyer and Nash were given glasses of orange juice, the teetotal Nordmeyer sipped his and said quietly "I seem to have Mr Nash's". On another social occasion future Prime Minister Robert Muldoon went to take a glass of orange juice, only to be told by the waitress "Oh no, Mr Muldoon, that's for Mr Nash. That's the one with gin in it." Keith Sinclair comments that while minister in Washington for 14 months:

[Nash] purchased an excellent cellar from a wealthy man. His cook, Margaret Moore, introduced him to 'old fashioneds' which, so he pretended, consisted of fruit juice. His taste for good food and drink expanded with opportunity – not that this had been lacking, for instance on his missions in the nineteen-thirties. It was generally supposed in New Zealand that Nash was a 'wowser', opposed to such human pleasures. This was so of Fraser, but quite untrue of Nash. He loved his food, and enjoyed good wine and liquor in moderation.

A grandson, Jeremy Nash, was elected a member of the Taupo Borough Council in 1971. Nash's great-grandson, Stuart Nash, was also an MP from 2008 to 2011 and again from 2014.

New Zealand Parliament
Preceded by Thomas Wilford	Member of Parliament for Hutt; 1929–1968	Succeeded by Trevor Young
Political offices
Preceded by Gordon Coates	Minister of Finance; 1935–1949	Succeeded by Sidney Holland
Preceded by Gordon Coates	Minister of Customs; 1935–1949	Succeeded by Charles Bowden
Preceded by Peter Fraser	Leader of the Opposition; 1951–1957	Succeeded by Keith Holyoake
Preceded by Tom Macdonald	Minister of Foreign Affairs; 1957–1960	Succeeded by Keith Holyoake
Preceded by Keith Holyoake	Prime Minister of New Zealand; 1957–1960	Succeeded by Keith Holyoake
Preceded by Keith Holyoake	Leader of the Opposition; 1960–1963	Succeeded by Arnold Nordmeyer
Preceded by Rex Mason	Father of the House; 1966–1968	Succeeded by Keith Holyoake
Party political offices
Preceded by Moses Ayrton	Secretary of the Labour Party; 1922–1932	Succeeded by Jim Thorn
Preceded by Tim Armstrong	President of the Labour Party; 1935–1936	Succeeded by Clyde Carr
Preceded by Peter Fraser	Deputy Leader of the Labour Party; 1940–1951	Succeeded by Jerry Skinner
Preceded by Peter Fraser	Leader of the Labour Party; 1951–1963	Succeeded by Arnold Nordmeyer
Diplomatic posts
New title	Minister from New Zealand in the United States; 1941–1944	Succeeded by Carl Berendsen
