= Auckland Suburbs (electorate) =

Auckland Suburbs was a parliamentary electorate in Auckland, New Zealand, from 1928 to 1946.

== Population centres ==
In the 1927 electoral redistribution, the North Island gained a further electorate from the South Island due to faster population growth. Five electorates were abolished, two former electorates were re-established, and three electorates, including Auckland Suburbs, were created for the first time. These changes came into effect with the 1928 election.

== History ==
The electorate was formed for the 1928 general election, and was only ever held by the Labour Party. It was represented by one Member of Parliament; Rex Mason, who had previously represented Eden.

Mayor James Gunson stood unsuccessfully for Reform in 1928.

The electorate was abolished in 1946.

=== Members of Parliament ===
From 1928 to 1946, Auckland Suburbs existed as a single-member electorate.

Election	Winner
1928 election	Rex Mason
1931 election	Rex Mason
1935 election	Rex Mason
1938 election	Rex Mason
1943 election	Rex Mason
(Abolished 1946)

== Election results ==
=== 1943 election ===
1943 general election: Auckland Suburbs
Party	Candidate	Votes	%	±%
Labour	Rex Mason	7,151	53.56	−15.68
National	Thomas Augustus Bishop	4,123	30.88	
Democratic Labour	Sydney Stephen Pennefeather	1,130	8.46	
Independent	Frederick Allen	453	3.39	+1.38
Independent Labour	John Isaac Fulcher Williams	186	1.39	
People's Movement	James Trevor Donovan	151	1.13	
Informal votes		125	0.93	+0.21
Majority		3,028	22.67	−18.56
Turnout		13,351	90.89	−1.48
Registered electors		14,689		

=== 1938 election ===
1938 general election: Auckland Suburbs
Party	Candidate	Votes	%	±%
Labour	Rex Mason	8,164	69.24	+1.11
National	Maxwell Stuart Walker	3,302	28.00	
Independent	Frederick Allen	238	2.01	
Informal votes		86	0.72	−0.05
Majority		4,862	41.23	−1.78
Turnout		11,790	92.37	+2.11
Registered electors		12,763		

=== 1935 election ===
1935 general election: Auckland Suburbs
Party	Candidate	Votes	%	±%
Labour	Rex Mason	7,749	68.07	+11.15
Reform	William Alexander Bishop	2,853	25.06	
Democrat	William Clark	781	6.86	
Informal votes		88	0.77	+0.26
Majority		4,896	43.01	+29.18
Turnout		11,383	90.26	+10.20
Registered electors		12,611		

=== 1931 election ===
1931 general election: Auckland Suburbs
Party	Candidate	Votes	%	±%
Labour	Rex Mason	5,033	56.92	+12.49
Reform	Richard Herbert Marryatt	3,810	43.08	
Majority		1,223	13.83	+2.71
Informal votes		45	0.51	−0.35
Turnout		8,888	80.06	−9.49
Registered electors		11,101		

=== 1928 election ===
1928 general election: Auckland Suburbs
Party	Candidate	Votes	%	±%
Labour	Rex Mason	4,357	44.43	
Reform	James Gunson	3,259	33.23	
United	Ernest Richard Allen	2,191	22.34	
Majority		1,098	11.20	
Informal votes		85	0.86	
Turnout		9,892	89.55	
Registered electors		11,046		
