= James Marshall (politician) =

New Zealand politician

James Marshall (1843 – 9 October 1912) was a member of the New Zealand Legislative Council.

Marshall was born in 1843 in Scotland. In New Zealand, he first lived in Southland. The West Coast gold rush brought him to the West Coast, and he lived in the mining communities of Granville, Orwell Creek, and Nobbs. About 1880, he settled at nearby Totara Flat, a settlement on the Grey River, where he was a farmer. He had previously been a packer, butcher, and publican. He was a member of the Grey County Council from its inception in 1877 until his death. On 28 November 1888, he was first elected chairman of the Grey Council. He chaired the county council for the years 1889, 1900, and 1909. He was a member of the Grey Education Board for 26 years until his death, and for many years served as its chairman. He was a member of the Legislative Council from 18 April 1902 to 17 April 1909; then 17 April 1909 to 9 October 1912, when he died. He was appointed by the Liberal Government under Richard Seddon, who as a fellow West Coaster knew him well. He succeeded James Kerr, who had died on 25 August 1901. James Holmes of Hokitika, another West Coaster, received his call to the Legislative Council on the same day as Marshall.

Marshall died at home in Totara Flat, and was survived by his wife Annie, one son, and one daughter. He was buried at Ahaura Cemetery in one of the largest funerals that the West Coast has ever seen, and that despite a special train that was to be scheduled from Greymouth not running. The funeral procession was one or two miles long.
