= James Kerr (New Zealand politician) =

James Kerr (1834 – 25 August 1901) was an editor and politician. He was a member of the New Zealand Legislative Council from 1892 until his death.

Kerr was born in Dumfriesshire, Scotland in 1834. He was an editor and worked for the Dumfriesshire and Galloway Herald, and then the Dumfries Courier. He emigrated to Melbourne in 1858 and after some time on gold fields, he worked for The Age alongside George Fisher. In 1861, he emigrated to Otago and joined the Otago Daily Times.

In 1865, he moved to Greymouth and set up the Grey River Argus. The newspaper was a rarity in that it openly declared its political affiliation; it was a supporter of the labour movement. Kerr was involved with many organisations, and sat on the borough council, was a member of the harbour board, and the education board. He was a director of the gas company, a trustee of the racecourse, and was active as a freemason.

Kerr was a close friend of Richard Seddon. He was appointed to the Legislative Council on 15 October 1892 by John Ballance during the Liberal Government. His term expired on 14 October 1899, and he was reappointed the following day. He served until his death on 25 August 1901. Kerr was on a journey home from New Zealand Parliament in Wellington when he became severely ill with asthma. The ship called at Westport to get medical support for Kerr. His wife and eldest son reached him at Westport before he died. Kerr was replaced by James Marshall on the Legislative Council.

His eldest son, also James Kerr (1875–1938), became proprietor of the Grey River Argus. Kerr Jr. became proprietor of the Hutt and Petone Chronicle in 1912, and the Kerrs moved to Petone. Kerr Jr. was an unsuccessful candidate for the United Party when he stood in the Hutt electorate in the 1929 by-election and 1931 election.

Kerr Avenue in Greymouth is named for the Hon. James Kerr.
