= 1929 Hutt by-election =

New Zealand by-election

- 18 December 1929
- Turnout: 12,555 (84.27%)
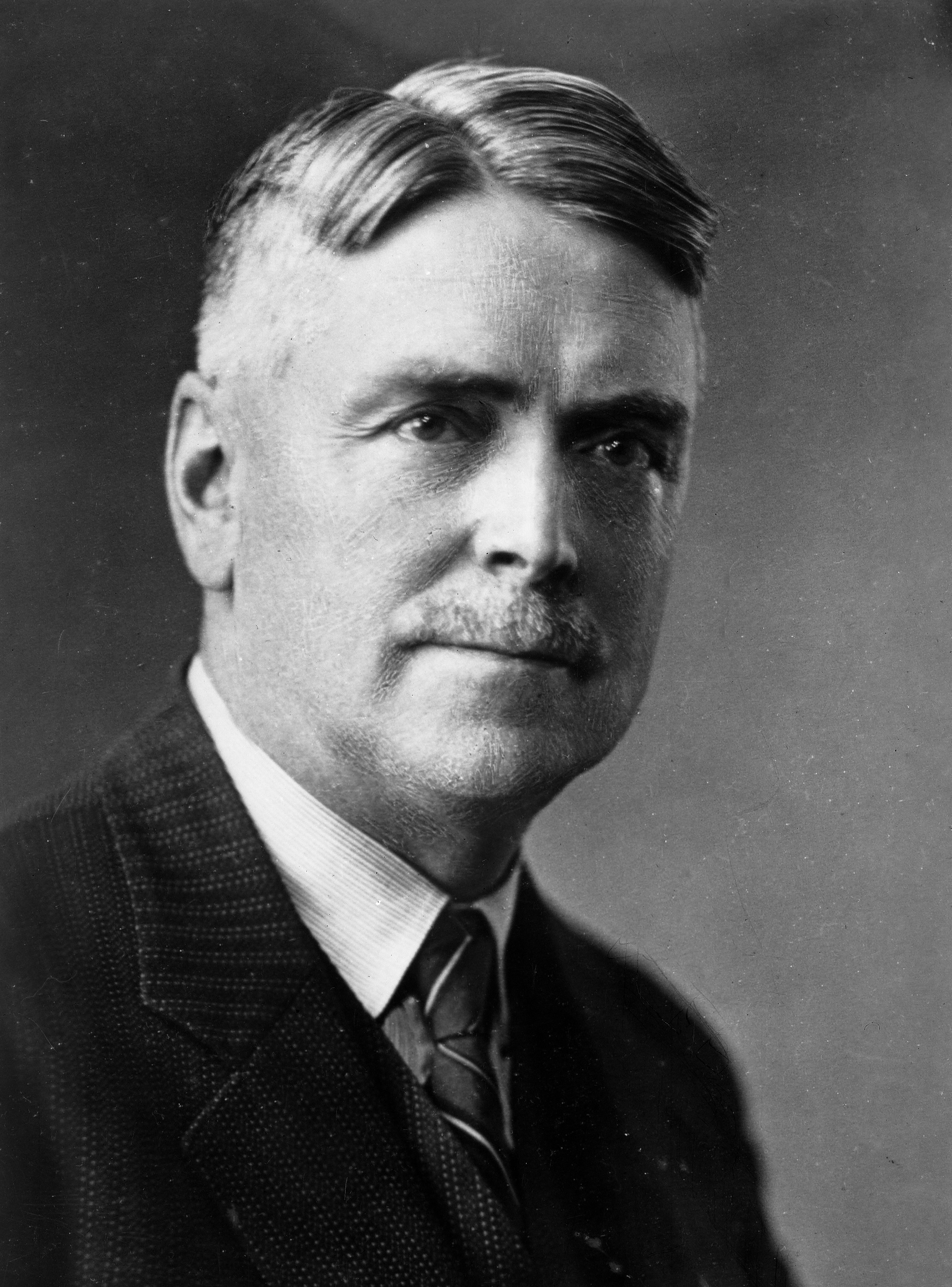

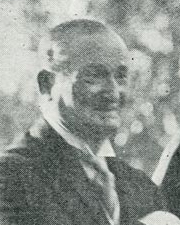
Candidate	Walter Nash	James Kerr	Harold Johnston
Party	Labour	United	Reform
Popular vote	5,047	4,835	2,570
Percentage	40.53	38.83	20.64
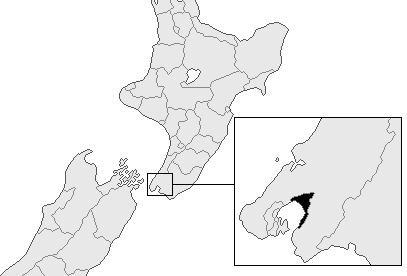
- Hutt electorate boundaries used for the by-election
Member before election
Thomas Wilford
United
Elected Member
Walter Nash
Labour

The Hutt by-election was a by-election in the New Zealand electorate of Hutt, an urban seat at the bottom of the North Island. The by-election was held on 18 December 1929, and was precipitated by the resignation of sitting United member of parliament Thomas Wilford on who had been appointed the High Commissioner to the United Kingdom by Prime Minister Joseph Ward. The by-election was contested by Walter Nash of the Labour Party, James Kerr from the United Party and Harold Johnston of the Reform Party. The lead up to the by-election was marred by harsh words between candidates.

== Candidates and selection process ==
=== Labour Party ===
After standing in Hutt for Labour in both 1925 and 1928, Walter Nash's selection as the Labour candidate for the by-election came as no surprise. Nash came a respectable second to Wilford and was seen as well capable of winning the seat. He was the current General Secretary of the Labour Party and was thus well known. Local newspaper The Hutt News (part owned by another candidate James Kerr) printed several articles through the campaigning attempting to discredit Nash as a Soviet-style socialist. Peter Fraser served as the campaign organiser, and Mark Fagan was Nash's election secretary. Just as the campaign was about to begin, a local businessman named Nash had been recently divorced and rumours spread that it was Walter Nash. To quell this canard Nash's advertisements featured him alongside his family. The pamphlet featured a portrait of him wearing glasses appearing as (according to his biographer) "... as a bespectacled and possibly severe man, looking more like a schoolmaster than a Labour agitator."

=== United Party ===
James Kerr, a resident of Petone, was the official United Party candidate in the election. He was the son of James Kerr, a former member of the Legislative Council. At the time Kerr was the proprietor of the Hutt and Petone Chronicle newspaper, a position he had held since 1912. He previously resided in Greymouth serving as the proprietor of the Grey River Argus. In 1908 he stood for the Grey seat against Speaker of the House, Arthur Guinness, being defeated by a small majority. Outgoing MP Thomas Wilford and his wife campaigned intensely on Kerr's behalf. Kerr was a member of the Petone Fire Board, an associate of the Petone Borough Council, President of the Petone Chamber of Commerce, and a member of the Hutt Valley High School Board of Governors. He was one of the foundation members of the United Party, and at the time a member of the executive and had been chairman of Wilford's election committee. Kerr's campaign manager was the president of the Lower Hutt Chamber of Commerce, Jack Andrews.

=== Reform Party ===
Several names were speculated as possible Reform candidates including the party's 1922 candidate Henry Bennett, Will Strand the Mayor of Lower Hutt and former mayor Sir Alex Roberts. Ultimately Harold Johnston was chosen as the Reform Party candidate for the contest. The only other nominee was Victor Jacobsen of Petone. Johnston was a respected lawyer and the fourth son of Charles Johnston, former MP for Te Aro and Speaker of the Legislative Council. Earlier that year the position of Chief Justice was offered to Johnston upon the death of Charles Skerrett, but he declined the offer, with Michael Myers becoming the next Chief Justice instead. Johnston was well known as an able speaker and he was regularly able to draw large crowds to his meetings. Reverend Richard Hobday wrote from Auckland rather critically of Johnston stating "What a weird looking creature Johnston is! He looks exactly like one of the vultures in our Zoo here!" Nash replied, writing more charitably of Johnston. The New Zealand Worker mused that while Johnston had been educated at Wanganui Collegiate School and Oxford University which had "left him with the attractive personality of a graduate of these institutions" but thinking him a Reform member by association rather than genuine conviction.

=== Independent ===
Henry Bennett (who contested the seat in 1922 for the Reform party) announced his candidacy as an independent. He proposed to stand in the interests of the country itself, rather than of any particular political party. Bennett was concerned that New Zealand could be 'handed over' to Socialism by a minority vote given the increasing competition for right wing votes by United and Reform. With candidate from both parties standing Bennett was not ignorant of the fact that he too was helping to split the anti-Labour vote, but claimed his hopes were that both would withdraw their candidates in favour of himself. However, his plea fell on deaf ears with United wanting to retain their seat and Reform seeking to supersede United in seats. As a result, Bennett withdrew and hoped either Kerr or Johnston would prevail.

== Campaign ==
Dozens of meetings were held and speeches made by the three candidates. Many high-profile figures spoke on behalf of the candidates as well, Harry Holland, James McCombs & Michael Joseph Savage for Nash, Thomas Wilford & Harry Atmore for Kerr and both Gordon Coates & William Downie Stewart Jr for Johnston.

Date	Nash	Kerr	Johnston
Wed, 20 November	Labour Hall, Petone	Oddfellows' Hall, Petone	
Thu, 21 November	Eandwick School	Lyceum Hall, Lower Hutt	
Fri, 22 November			
Sat, 23 November			
Sun, 24 November			
Mon, 25 November	Oddfellows' Hall, Lower Hutt		Dellabarca's Hall, Eastbourne
Tue, 26 November	Eastbourne Borough Chambers		Petone Committee Rooms
Wed, 27 November			
Thu, 28 November		95 Hutt Road, Petone	
Fri, 29 November			
Sat, 30 November			
Sun, 1 December			
Mon, 2 December	King George Theatre, Lower Hutt		
Tue, 3 December			
Wed, 4 December			King George Theatre, Lower Hutt
Thu, 5 December	Labour Hall, Petone		
Fri, 6 December			
Sat, 7 December			
Sun, 8 December			
Mon, 9 December	Day's Bay Pavilion	Alicetown Church Hall	
Tue, 10 December	Moera Community Hall	Empire Theatre, Petone	Waiwhetu Methodist Hall
Wed, 11 December			Moera Community Hall
Thu, 12 December	Eastern Hutt School	Oddfellows' Hall, Petone	King George Theatre, Lower Hutt
Fri, 13 December	Labour Hall, Petone	Knox Church Hall	Wesley Hall, Petone
Sat, 14 December		King George Theatre, Lower Hutt	
Sun, 15 December			
Mon, 16 December			Korokoro School
Tue, 17 December			Eastbourne, Picture Hall

At Nash's first meeting, held at the Petone Labour Hall, the power cut out and Nash was forced to speak to the crowd for an hour and forty minutes by candlelight. Despite this the hall was full and audience was enthusiastic. At several of Nash's subsequent meetings he had trouble with interjectors from the Junior Reform League. The most infamous was when a fleet of motor cars was used to take Junior Reform members from Wellington to noisily drive past a meeting at Day's Bay. One of them questioned Nash's loyalty to the Crown, and a vote of confidence in him at the meeting's end was lost by a large majority due to the Junior Reformers presence.

Johnston claimed that Labour wanted to confiscate private land, would probably raise interest rates, repudiate interest payments on accounts with the Post Office Savings Bank and that privately owned shops in Moera 'would be taken over by the State'. Nash strongly denied all these allegations. At one of Johnston's meetings interjectors denouncing the Reform Party because "They put us in a swamp", referring to the local unemployed being given low paying relief work, worth only "nine bob a day." The meeting concluded with cheers for Nash and Labour leader Harry Holland rather than Johnston.

== Election results ==
The following table gives the election results:

1929 Hutt by-election
Party	Candidate	Votes	%	±%
Labour	Walter Nash	5,047	40.53	−4.55
United	James Kerr (Note: For some biographical details of Kerr refer to his father's article.)	4,835	38.83	
Reform	Harold Johnston (Note: For some biographical details of Johnston refer to his father's article.)	2,570	20.64	
Majority		212	1.70	−8.14
Informal votes		103	0.82	−1.31
Turnout		12,555	84.27	−6.67
Registered electors		14,898		

Table footnotes:

When the results were announced on election night, Nash spoke to a crowd from the mayoral office in Upper Hutt, saying that the harsh words on the campaign should be forgotten and all should work together for good and received cheers from those in attendance. The Wellington newspaper The Evening Post wrote that Nash would likely be a moderating influence on Labour policy owing to his experience as a business owner (a rarity among Labour politicians at this time).
