= 1926 Eden by-election =

New Zealand by-election

- 15 April 1926
- Turnout: 11,048
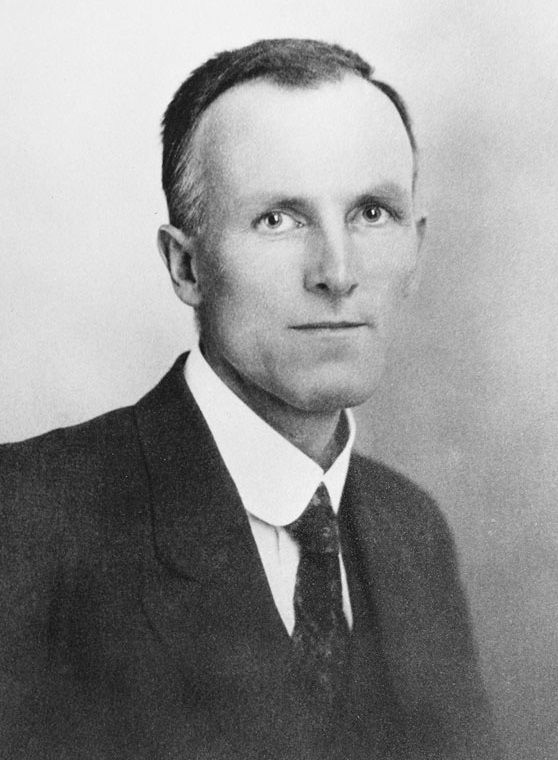

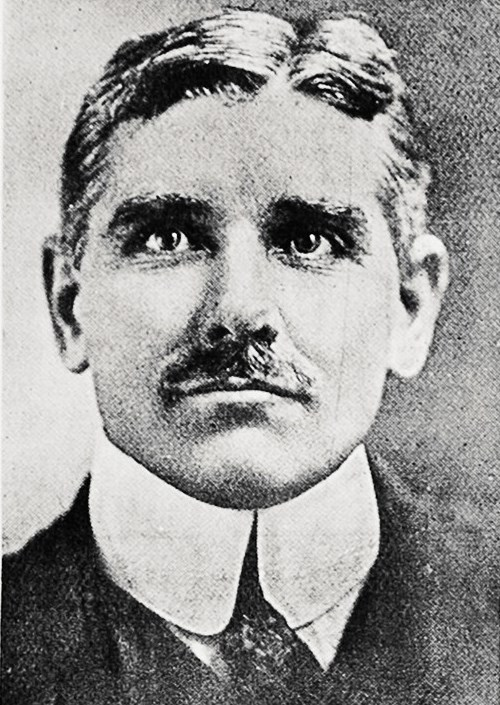

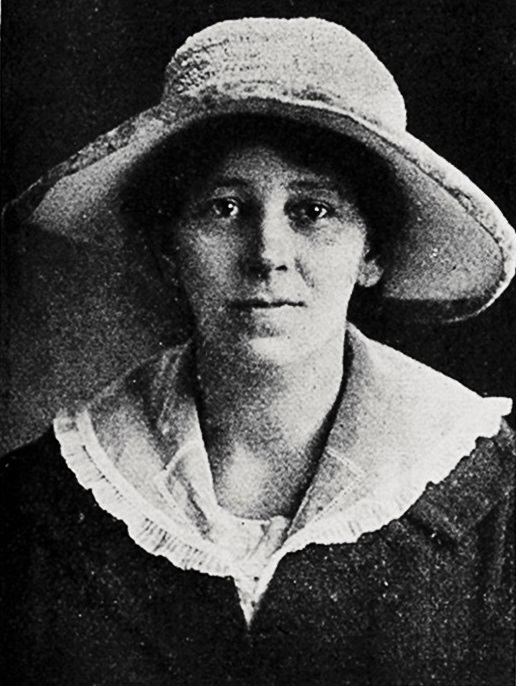
Candidate	Rex Mason	James Gunson	Ellen Melville
Party	Labour	Reform	Independent Reform
Popular vote	4,589	4,163	2,197
Percentage	41.54%	37.68%	19.89%
Member before election
James Parr
Reform
Elected Member
Rex Mason
Labour

The 1926 Eden by-election was a by-election for the Eden electorate during the 22nd New Zealand Parliament. The seat became vacant after the appointment of the sitting member, James Parr of the Reform Party as High Commissioner to London. Parr resigned on 26 March. Labour won the by-election and became the official opposition in Parliament.

== Background ==
The by-election was held on 15 April 1926. Three candidates contested the seat. James Gunson the official Reform candidate had been Mayor of Auckland from 1915 to 1925. Ellen Melville stood as an "Independent" Reform candidate, claiming interference by the party organiser Albert Davy prevented her being selected as the official candidate. The Reform Party vote was split allowing the Labour candidate, Rex Mason, to win. The Liberal Party was "so weak .... that they could not field a candidate.

Labour's candidate in Eden from the previous general election, Rex Mason was successful in winning the party nomination. The three others who vied for the candidacy were Frank Langstone (former MP for Waimarino), Tom Bloodworth (an Auckland City Councillor) and Jim Purtell (secretary of the Auckland Glassworkers' Union).

Gunson was expected to "romp home" in the by-election; Reform had 55 seats. But with the Liberals having 11 seats plus two Liberal-leaning independents and Labour 12, Labour realised their chance to be the official Opposition and "threw their all" into their contest; helped by Melville standing as Independent Reform. "Never before or since have people in the sprawling electorate stretching from Eden Park, through Mount Albert, Pt Chevalier, New Lynn, Te Atatu, Massey and Hobsonville been wooed as assiduously as they were in March and April 1926" with party leaders Coates and Holland spending days in the electorate.

As a result of Labour's candidate Rex Mason winning the by-election, Labour became the second largest party in Parliament and Harry Holland became Leader of the Opposition on 16 June 1926.

== Result ==
The following table gives the election results:

1926 Eden by-election
Party	Candidate	Votes	%	±%
Labour	Rex Mason	4,589	41.54	+2.06
Reform	James Gunson	4,163	37.68	
Independent Reform	Ellen Melville	2,197	19.89	
Informal votes		99	0.90	−0.02
Majority		3,811	3.86	
Turnout		11,048	80.03	−11.23
Labour gain from Reform		Swing		

=== Results by locality ===
Following table showcasts the detailed results by locality for the ballot:

Locality	Mason (Labour)		Gunson (Reform)		Melville (Ind. Reform)		Winner
Locality	Votes	%	Votes	%	Votes	%	Winner
Avondale Town Hall	576	47.21	393	32.21	251	20.58	Mason
Avondale Flat	73	25.25	116	40.13	100	34.60	Gunson
Avondale South	153	46.08	117	35.24	62	18.67	Mason
Brigham's Creek	3	5.46	35	63.64	17	30.90	Gunson
Edendale	234	50.74	114	24.72	113	24.51	Mason
Glen Eden	159	33.75	237	50.31	75	15.92	Gunson
Henderson Foresters Hall	258	37.61	303	44.16	125	18.23	Gunson
Henderson Valley	5	8.92	27	48.21	24	42.85	Gunson
Hobsonville	55	34.16	68	42.23	38	23.60	Gunson
Huia	26	36.61	40	56.33	5	7.04	Gunson
Karekare	2	25.00	6	75.00	0	0.00	Gunson
Morningside	684	49.31	422	30.42	281	20.25	Mason
St. Luke's	202	35.43	200	35.08	168	29.47	Mason
Mont Albert	553	34.05	697	42.91	374	23.02	Gunson
New Lynn	593	51.74	410	35.77	143	12.47	Mason
Nihotupu	6	21.42	20	71.42	2	7.14	Gunson
Oratia	19	15.70	81	66.94	21	17.35	Gunson
Parau	7	28.00	17	68.00	1	4.00	Gunson
Point Chevallier	615	58.18	280	26.49	162	15.32	Mason
Swanson	46	21.90	87	41.42	77	36.66	Gunson
Taupaki	12	12.12	79	79.79	8	8.08	Gunson
Te Atatu	13	10.61	85	75.22	15	13.27	Gunson
Titirangi	14	13.72	77	75.49	11	10.78	Gunson
Waitakere	28	30.76	46	50.54	17	18.68	Gunson
Western Springs	127	66.84	46	24.21	17	8.94	Mason
Whenuapai	10	17.85	29	51.78	17	30.35	Gunson
Total	4,589	41.54	4,163	37.68	2,197	19.89	Mason
