= Rex Mason =

New Zealand politician

The Honourable Rex Mason CMG QC
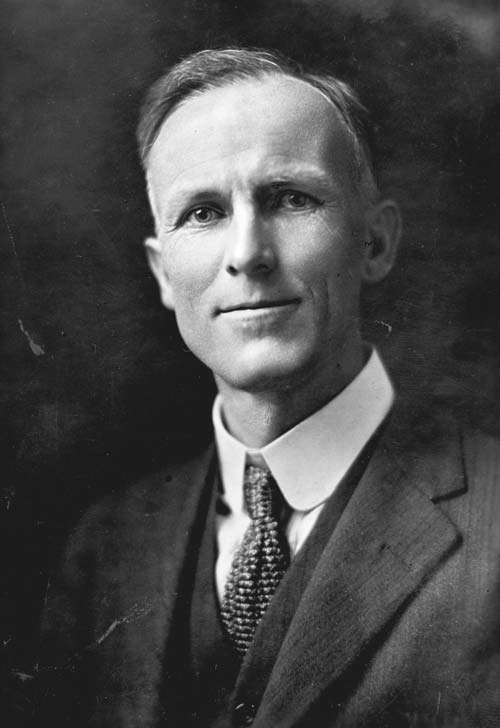
- Mason in 1950

17th Attorney-General
- In office 6 December 1935 – 13 December 1949
- Prime Minister: Michael Joseph Savage; Peter Fraser
- Preceded by: George Forbes
- Succeeded by: Clifton Webb
- In office 12 December 1957 – 12 December 1960
- Prime Minister: Walter Nash
- Preceded by: Jack Marshall
- Succeeded by: Ralph Hanan

30th Minister of Justice
- In office 6 December 1935 – 13 December 1949
- Prime Minister: Michael Joseph Savage; Peter Fraser
- Preceded by: John Cobbe
- Succeeded by: Clifton Webb
- In office 12 December 1957 – 12 December 1960
- Prime Minister: Walter Nash
- Preceded by: Jack Marshall
- Succeeded by: Ralph Hanan

18th Minister of Health
- In office 12 December 1957 – 12 December 1960
- Prime Minister: Walter Nash
- Preceded by: Ralph Hanan
- Succeeded by: Norman Shelton

23rd Minister of Education
- In office 30 April 1940 – 18 October 1947
- Prime Minister: Peter Fraser
- Preceded by: Peter Fraser
- Succeeded by: Terry McCombs

26th Minister of Native Affairs
- In office 7 July 1943 – 19 December 1946
- Prime Minister: Peter Fraser
- Preceded by: Frank Langstone
- Succeeded by: Peter Fraser

10th President of the Labour Party
- In office 8 April 1931 – 29 March 1932
- Vice President: William Atkinson
- Preceded by: Jim Thorn
- Succeeded by: Bill Jordan

Member of Parliament
- In office 15 April 1926 – 29 October 1966
- Constituency: Eden (1926–1928); Auckland Suburbs (1928–1946); Waitakere (1946–1963); New Lynn (1963–1966)

Personal details
- Born: Henry Greathead Rex Mason; 3 June 1885 Wellington, New Zealand
- Died: 2 April 1975 (aged 89) Wellington, New Zealand
- Party: Labour
- Spouse: Dulcia Martina Rockell
- Children: 4
- Education: Victoria University

Henry Greathead Rex Mason CMG QC (3 June 1885 – 2 April 1975) was a New Zealand politician. He served as Attorney General, Minister of Justice, Minister of Education, and Minister of Native Affairs, and had a significant influence on the direction of the Labour Party. The longest-serving Member of Parliament in New Zealand history, Mason served in Parliament continuously from 1926 to 1966. He is also the only person to serve as a Member of the New Zealand Parliament for over 40 years.

== Early life ==
Mason was born in Wellington on 3 June 1885. His father was Harry Brooks Mason, a compositor at the Government Printing Works (who worked for Hansard for a time) from South Africa. His mother, Henrietta Emma Rex, was an Australian who helped form the Women's Social and Political League and was vice-president in 1894. She also taught ballroom dancing in Wellington prior to World War I.

Mason was educated at Clyde Quay School, then Wellington College where he was dux in 1902. He won a scholarship and attended Victoria University where graduated in 1907 with a Master of Arts with honours in mathematics and a Bachelor of Laws. He then worked in several law firms in Wellington and Eltham before opening his own practice in Pukekohe in 1911. He was soon joined in the practice by his brother Spencer, who later became president of the Auckland District Law Society.

On 27 December 1912 Mason married Dulcia Martina Rockell at Auckland. Together they had two sons and two daughters. Through his wife's influence, Mason become interested in Indian religion and spirituality, and beliefs derived from it (particularly Theosophy). He was a vegetarian and a teetotaller.

== Political career ==
New Zealand Parliament
Years	Term	Electorate	Party
1926–1928	22nd	Eden	Labour
1928–1931	23rd	Auckland Suburbs	Labour
1931–1935	24th	Auckland Suburbs	Labour
1935–1938	25th	Auckland Suburbs	Labour
1938–1943	26th	Auckland Suburbs	Labour
1943–1946	27th	Auckland Suburbs	Labour
1946–1949	28th	Waitakere	Labour
1949–1951	29th	Waitakere	Labour
1951–1954	30th	Waitakere	Labour
1954–1957	31st	Waitakere	Labour
1957–1960	32nd	Waitakere	Labour
1960–1963	33rd	Waitakere	Labour
1963–1966	34th	New Lynn	Labour

Mason was elected Mayor of Pukekohe in 1915. He was left-wing in his political outlook, and joined the Labour Party on its foundation in 1916. In the 1919 general election, he was Labour's candidate for the seat of Manukau, but was defeated. Mason sought the Labour nomination for the 1921 by-election in the Auckland East seat, but was beaten by John A. Lee. Later, he shifted his attention to the seat of Eden — he contested it in the 1922 election and 1925 election. He finally won Eden in a 1926 by-election, assisted by the fact that the Reform Party's vote was split by a defeated nominee, Ellen Melville.

Rex Mason represented the seat of Eden in the 22nd Parliament (1926–28), Auckland Suburbs in the 23rd to 27th Parliaments (1928–46), Waitakere in the 28th to 33rd Parliaments (1946–63), and New Lynn in the 34th Parliament (1963–66).

In both 1931 and 1933 he stood unsuccessfully for Mayor of Auckland City on a Labour Party ticket, defeated by George Hutchison on both occasions.

Throughout his parliamentary career, Mason remained highly involved in the organisation of the Labour Party. He served as its president from 1931 to 1933, and played a major role in policy formulation. Mason was regarded as a social democrat rather than a socialist, and he played a part in moving the Labour Party closer to the political centre. He did, however, believe that the state should have exclusive control over the country's financial system, influenced by social credit monetary reform theories. Other causes supported by Mason include the establishment of a comprehensive old-age pension system and the granting of full state services to naturalised immigrants (the latter making him extremely popular with his electorate's substantial Yugoslavian community).

In 1935, Mason was awarded the King George V Silver Jubilee Medal.

=== First Labour government ===
When Labour won the 1935 general election, Mason became Attorney General and Minister of Justice, reflecting his legal background. When disputes arose between the party leadership and John A. Lee's more radical faction, Mason remained on good terms with both sides — while he sympathised with some of Lee's points, particularly regarding monetary reform, he did not join Lee's breakaway Democratic Labour Party (DLP). Mason later served as Minister of Education (where he worked closely with C. E. Beeby to implement educational reforms) and as Minister of Native Affairs. In 1941 the Public Service Commissioner Thomas Mark died in (or just outside) the minister's office, during a confrontation with Mason who wanted the resignation of the head of a department.

The chief justice, Michael Myers, was of the view that the Crown's principal law officers should be King's Counsel. On 23 July 1946, Mason (who was Minister of Justice) and Herbert Evans (who was solicitor-general) received their appointment. Mason was not returned to Cabinet after the 1946 election, but returned to fill a vacancy the following year. After Labour lost office, he continued to agitate on a number of issues, notably decimal currency.

=== Opposition ===
In 1953 Mason was among several Labour MPs who attempted an abortive coup to remove the 71-year-old Walter Nash as party leader, others included Bill Anderton and Arnold Nordmeyer. Mason informed Nash that several members were complaining about the party's leadership to him, and that he thought that the majority wanted to have a new leader. By 1954 a majority of the caucus was in favour of leadership change but pressure from the unions and continued support from Party branches allowed Nash to survive the subsequent caucus vote.

In 1953, Mason was awarded the Queen Elizabeth II Coronation Medal.

=== Second Labour government ===
After Labour won the 1957 election, Mason returned to his previous roles of Attorney General and Minister of Justice. He was also made Minister of Health.

In 1959 he introduced a bill proposing that men convicted of homosexual acts should be dealt with as merely indecent assaults and therefore carry a lighter penalty. Mason was unfairly and inaccurately accused of attempting to amend the law to legalise homosexual acts between consenting males and adopt the recommendations of the 1957 Wolfenden Report on homosexuality in England. In 1961 Nationals deputy leader Jack Marshall retracted much of his party's criticism, claiming they had misunderstood the intention of the bill.

=== Later career ===
Mason eventually retired from politics at the 1966 election, under a certain amount of pressure from colleagues who wished to "rejuvenate" the Labour Party. Mason was now in his eighties. Two years earlier he had broken Āpirana Ngata's record for the longest consecutive service in Parliament and Maurice O'Rorke's record for the longest overall service in Parliament. He is the only person to have served as an MP for over 40 years.

He was invited by new Prime Minister Norman Kirk as a guest of honour to the first meeting of caucus following Labour's victory in the 1972 election where he oversaw the election of the cabinet.

In the 1967 New Year Honours, Mason was appointed a Companion of the Order of St Michael and St George, for public services.

== Death ==
Mason died in Wellington on 2 April 1975, aged 89, and his ashes were buried in Karori Cemetery.

Mason Street in his home electorate of New Lynn is named after him.

== Notes ==
New Zealand Parliament
Preceded by James Parr	Member of Parliament for Eden; 1926–1928	Succeeded by Arthur Stallworthy
New constituency	Member of Parliament for Auckland Suburbs; 1928–1946	Constituency abolished
New constituency	Member of Parliament for Waitakere; 1946–1963	Succeeded by Martyn Finlay
New constituency	Member of Parliament for New Lynn; 1963–1966	Succeeded by Jonathan Hunt
Political offices
Preceded by John Cobbe	Minister of Justice; 1935–1949 1957–1960	Succeeded by Clifton Webb
Preceded by Jack Marshall	Minister of Justice; 1935–1949 1957–1960	Succeeded by Ralph Hanan
Preceded by George Forbes	Attorney-General; 1935–1949 1957–1960	Succeeded by Clifton Webb
Preceded by Jack Marshall	Attorney-General; 1935–1949 1957–1960	Succeeded by Ralph Hanan
Preceded by Peter Fraser	Minister of Education; 1940–1947	Succeeded by Terry McCombs
Preceded by Frank Langstone	Minister of Native Affairs; 1943–1946	Succeeded by Peter Fraser
Preceded by Ralph Hanan	Minister of Health; 1957–1960	Succeeded by Norman Shelton
Party political offices
Preceded by Jim Thorn	President of the Labour Party; 1931–1932	Succeeded by Bill Jordan
