= List of people from Wellington =

This is a list of notable people who were born in Wellington, New Zealand, or who spent a significant part of their lives living in the region.

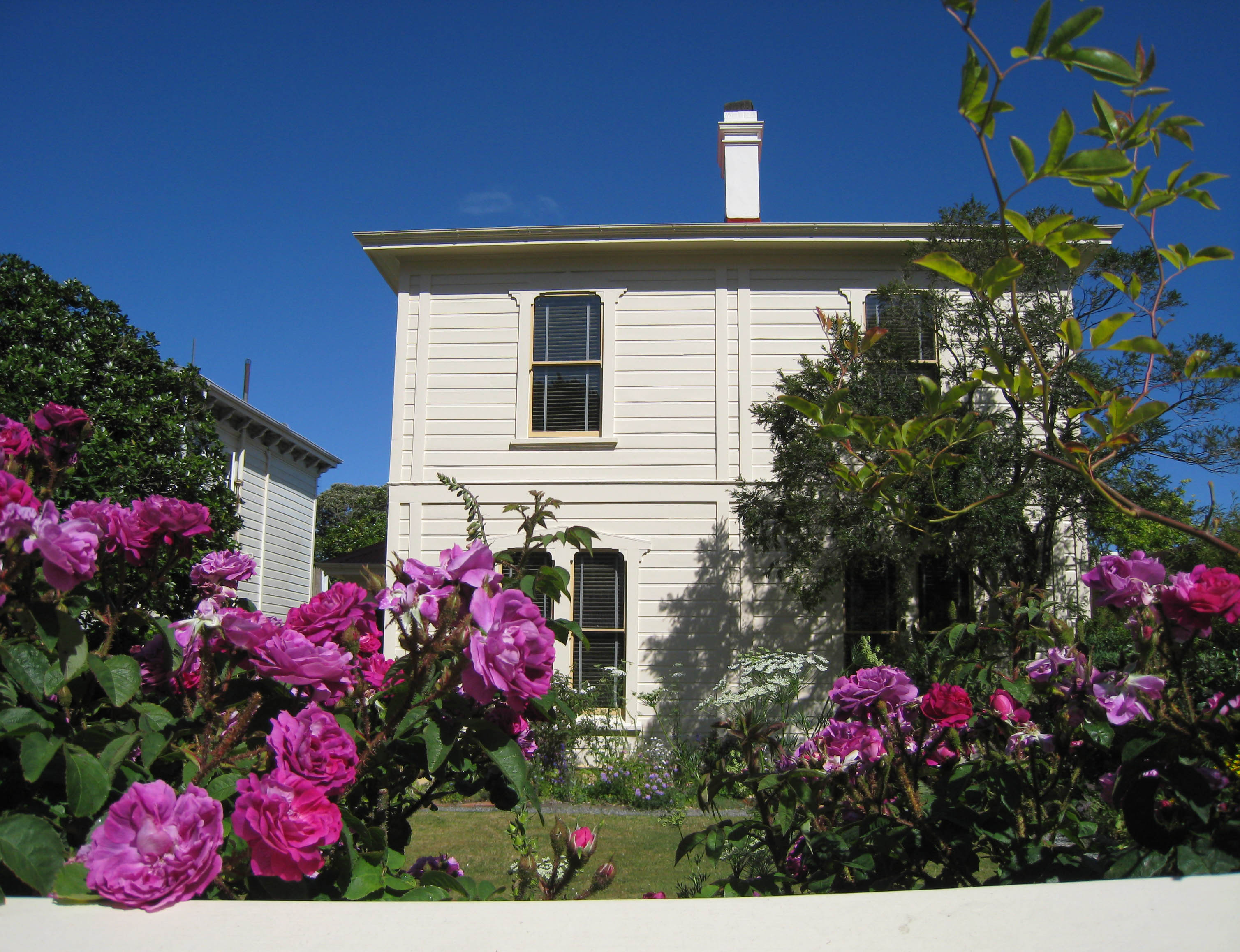
Katherine Mansfield Birthplace in Thorndon

(Alphabetically by surname)

== The arts ==
=== Comedy ===
- Raybon Kan – comedian

=== Drag ===
- Pollyfilla (Colin McLean) – drag queen

=== Drama ===
- Russell Crowe – Oscar-winning actor
- Kerry Fox – actress
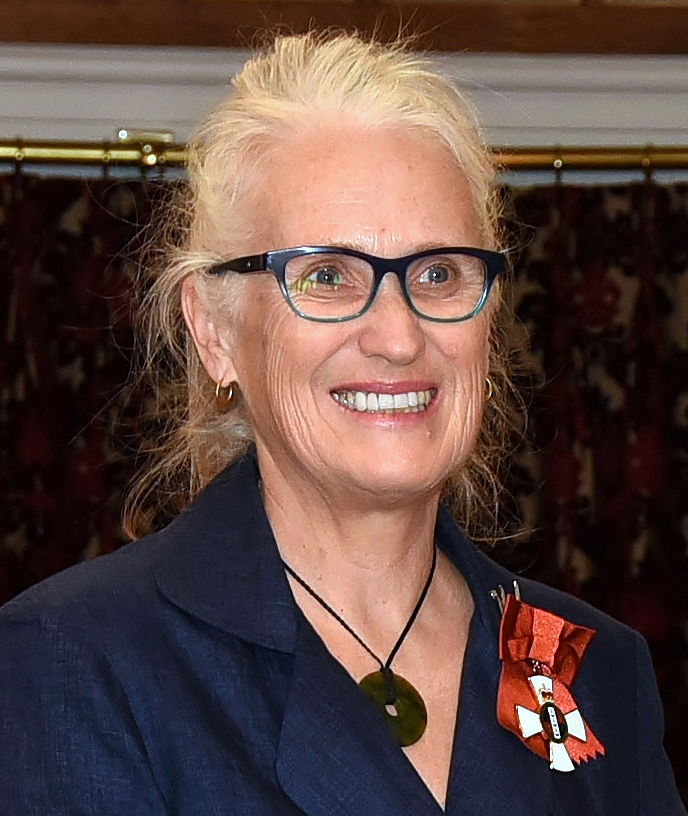
- Jane Campion
  Anna Paquin – Oscar-winning actress
- Antonia Prebble – actress
- Emmett Skilton – actor
- Antony Starr – actor
- Karl Urban – actor

=== Film ===
- Jane Campion – Oscar winning film-maker
- Peter Jackson – Oscar-winning film-maker
- Davida McKenzie – film actress
- Thomasin McKenzie – film and television actress
- Clive Revill – film and theatre actor
- Lee Tamahori – film director
- Richard Taylor – head of film prop and special effects company Weta Workshop; multiple Oscar winner
- Taika Waititi – film director, screenwriter, actor, and comedian
- Fran Walsh – Oscar-winning screenwriter

=== Music ===
- Jemaine Clement – musician, member of Flight of the Conchords
- Brooke Fraser – multi-platinum selling singer
- Anthony Jennings – harpsichordist, organist, choral and orchestral director, and academic
- Andy Kent – bass player for You Am I
- Ben Lummis – singer, 2004 New Zealand Idol winner
- Tina Matthews – musician (The Crocodiles), puppeteer, writer
- Bret McKenzie – musician, member of Flight of the Conchords
- John Psathas – composer
- John Charles – composer
- Eddie Rayner – musician – Crowded House, Split Enz
- Frankie Stevens – entertainer, singer and judge of New Zealand Idol
- Jon Toogood – singer and guitarist for the rock band Shihad
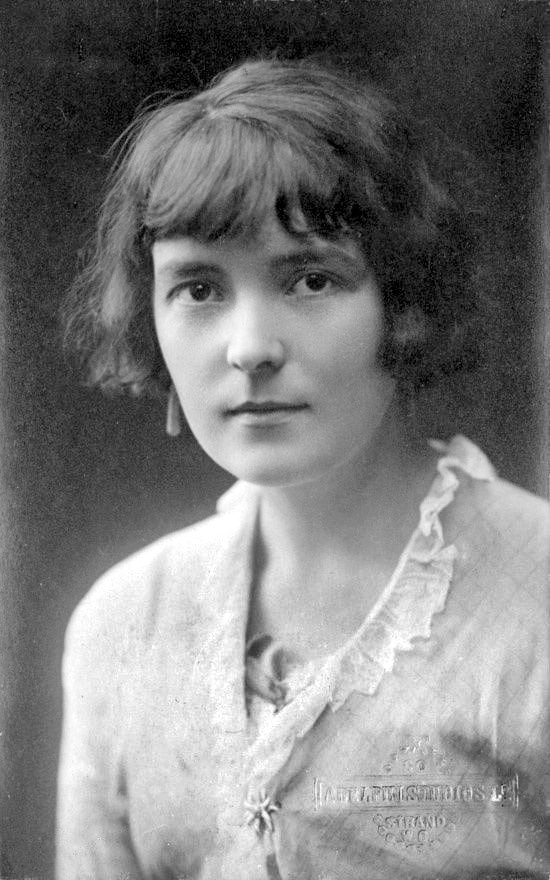
  Katherine Mansfield
- Rosita Vai – singer, 2005 New Zealand Idol winner

=== Visual arts ===
- Tom Scott – cartoonist, political commentator

=== Writing ===
- Ann Shulgin – author
- Ivan Bootham – novelist, short story writer, poet and composer
- Neil Cross – writer
- Richard Curtis – movie and TV writer and director
- Lauris Edmond – poet
- Robin Hyde – poet
- John Gallas – poet and educator
- Patricia Grace – writer
- Lloyd Jones – writer
- Elizabeth Knox – author
- Katherine Mansfield – writer
- Bruce Mason – playwright
- Christopher Pugsley – writer
- Sydney Goodsir Smith – Scots language poet

== Broadcasting ==
- John Campbell – broadcaster and news journalist
- Selwyn Toogood (dec.) – broadcaster
- Dan Wootton – broadcaster and news journalist

== Business ==
- Mark Dunajtschik – property developer and philanthropist
- Sam Morgan – founder of online auction site TradeMe
- Peter Vincent – entrepreneur, founder/CEO of Vincent Aviation
- Dame Therese Walsh – chief operating officer for the 2011 Rugby World Cup and head of the organising body for the 2015 Cricket World Cup
- Jack Yan – publisher and graphic designer

== Politics and public service ==
- Lettie Annie Allen – public servant and political activist
- Robin Cooke, Baron Cooke of Thorndon (dec.) – barrister and jurist
- Francis Fisher – politician, tennis player
- Jessica Hammond – The Opportunities Party politician
- Bill Hastings – lawyer, Chief Censor
- Joe Mack – trade union leader
- Jack Marshall (dec.) – former Prime Minister
- Gerald O'Brien – public servant and politician
- Nancy Wake (dec.) – World War II British agent
- Fran Wilde – Mayor, Member of Parliament
- Michael Wilford – diplomat

== Religion ==
- Francis Douglas – Catholic missionary priest killed in World War II
- Thomas Stafford Cardinal Williams (1930–2023) – Cardinal-Priest of Gesù Divin Maestro alla Pineta Sacchetti (1983–2023); Fifth Catholic Archbishop of Wellington and Metropolitan of New Zealand (1979–2005)

== Science and technology ==
- Rod Drury – technology entrepreneur
- Alan MacDiarmid (dec.) – scientist
- Richard Cockburn Maclaurin (dec.) – physicist, foundation professor of Victoria University and president of MIT
- William Hayward Pickering (dec.) – electrical engineer, former head of the Jet Propulsion Laboratory in California
- Matt Visser – physicist and mathematician

== Sport ==
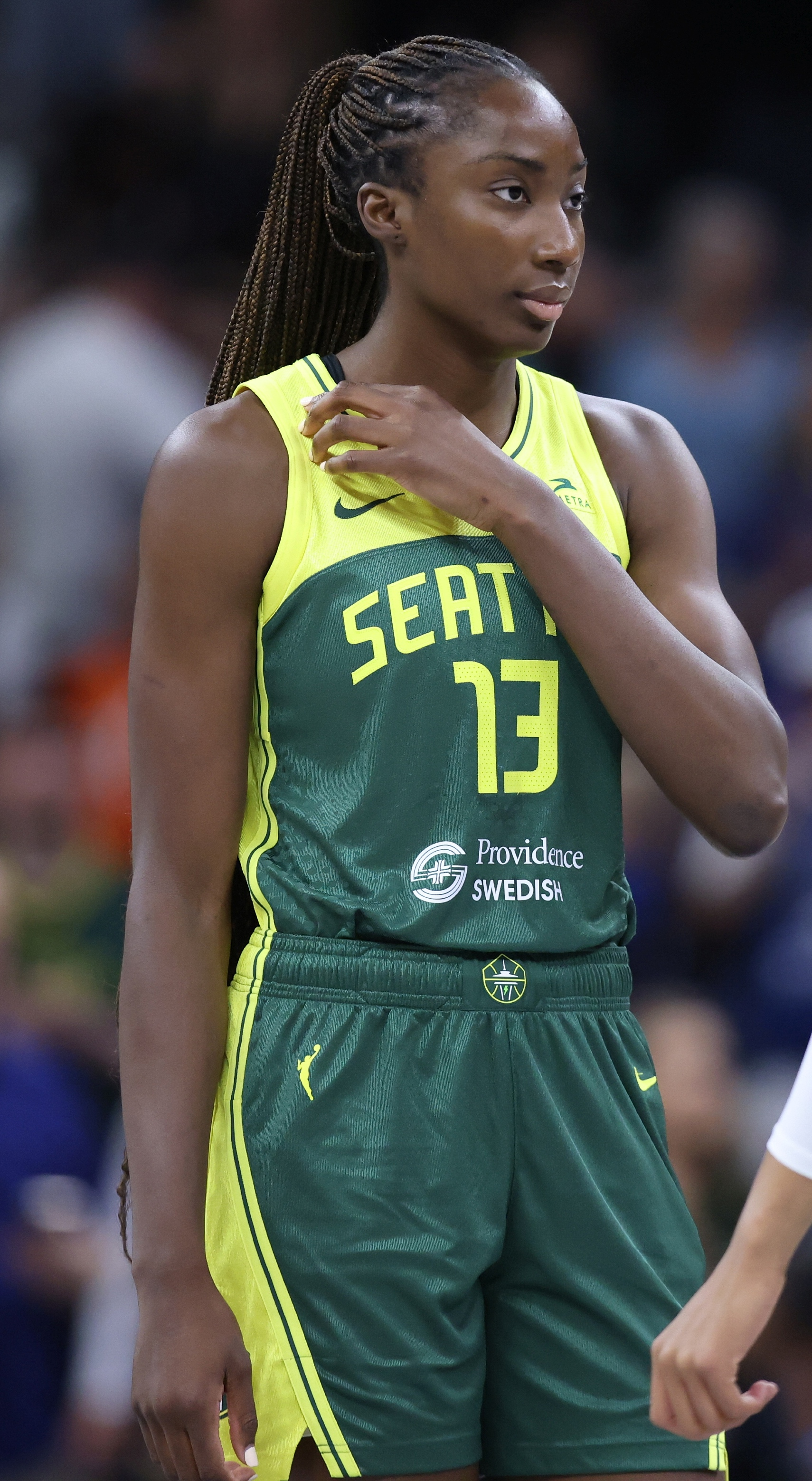
- Ezi Magbegor
  Leo Bertos – footballer
- Jim Cassidy – jockey
- Murray Chandler – chess grandmaster
- Russell Coutts – professional sailor
- Anton Down-Jenkins (born 1999) – diver
- Phillip Drew (born 1986) – international croquet player
- Simon Elliott – footballer
- Chris Killen – footballer
- Alexandra Kiroi-Bogatyreva (born 2002) – Olympic rhythmic gymnast
- Ezi Magbegor – WNBA center for the Seattle Storm
- Melissa Moon – two-time world mountain running champion
- Jeetan Patel – cricketer
- Wynton Rufer – footballer
- Jesse Ryder – cricketer
- Jonathan Sarfati – chess master and author, raised in Wellington
- Ross Taylor (born 1984) – cricketer
- Ruby Tui (born 1991) – rugby sevens player.
- Tana Umaga – former captain of the All Blacks
- Rob Szabo – darts player
- Jahrome Hughes - Dally M Medal winner, Melbourne Storm halfback
- Nelson Asofa Solomona - former NRL player

== Other ==
- Ben Hana – well-known homeless man
- Harold Jack Underwood (1908–1979) – clerk, farmer, toy-maker, and manufacturer
- Heinrich Franz Vosseler – engineer and oil refinery owner
