= Wellington Region =

Region of New Zealand

Greater Wellington (Wellington Region) Te Upoko o te Ika a Māui (Māori)
- Region
- Greater Wellington within New Zealand
- Coordinates: 41°17′S 174°46′E
- Country: New Zealand
- Island: North Island
- Established: 1989
- Seat: Wellington
- Territorial authorities: List: Wellington City; Porirua City; Hutt City; Upper Hutt City; Kāpiti Coast District; South Wairarapa District; Carterton District; Masterton District; Tararua District (part)

Government
  - Body: Greater Wellington Regional Council
  - Chair: Daran Ponter (Labour)
  - Deputy Chair: Ros Connelly

Area
  - Land: 8,049.44 km^{2} (3,107.91 sq mi)

Population (June 2025)
  - Region: 543,400
  - Density: 67.51/km^{2} (174.8/sq mi)

GDP
  - Total: NZ$44.987 billion (2021) (3rd)
  - Per capita: NZ$82,772 (2021)
- Time zone: UTC+12:00 (NZST)
  - Summer (DST): UTC+13:00 (NZDT)
- ISO 3166 code: NZ-WGN
- HDI (2023): 0.968 very high · 1st
- Website: www.GW.govt.nz

The Wellington Region, also known as Greater Wellington (Māori: Te Upoko o te Ika), is one of sixteen regions of New Zealand, the southernmost one on the North Island. The local government region covers an area of 8,049 square kilometres (3,108 sq mi), and has a population of 543,400 (June 2025).

The region takes its name from Wellington, New Zealand's capital city and the region's seat. The Wellington urban area, including the cities of Wellington, Porirua, Lower Hutt, and Upper Hutt, accounts for 79 percent of the region's population; other major urban areas include the Kapiti conurbation (Waikanae, Paraparaumu, Raumati Beach, Raumati South, and Paekākāriki) and the town of Masterton.

== Local government ==
The region is officially named "the Wellington Region". It is administered by the Wellington Regional Council, which uses the promotional name Greater Wellington Regional Council.

The council region covers the conurbation around the capital city, Wellington, and the cities of Lower Hutt, Porirua, and Upper Hutt, each of which has a rural hinterland; it extends up the west coast of the North Island, taking in the coastal settlements of the Kāpiti Coast District; east of the Remutaka Range it includes three largely rural districts containing most of Wairarapa, covering the towns of Masterton, Carterton, Greytown, Featherston and Martinborough. The Wellington Regional Council was first formed in 1980 from a merger of the Wellington Regional Planning Authority and the Wellington Regional Water Board.

Following the creation of the Auckland Council 'super-city' in 2009, a similar merger for councils within the Wellington region was investigated by the Local Government Commission in 2013. The proposal was scrapped in 2015 following negative public feedback.

== Term Wellington region ==
In common usage, the terms Wellington Region and Greater Wellington are not clearly defined, and areas on the periphery of the region are often excluded. In the more restrictive sense, the terms refer to the cluster of built-up areas west of the Tararua ranges. The much more sparsely populated area to the east has its own name, Wairarapa, and a centre in Masterton. To a lesser extent, the Kāpiti Coast is sometimes excluded from the region. Otaki in particular has strong connections to the Horowhenua district to the north, including having been part of the MidCentral District Health Board (DHB) area, instead of the Capital and Coast DHB area like the rest of the Kāpiti Coast.

== History ==
The Māori who originally settled the region knew it as Te Upoko o te Ika a Māui, meaning "the head of Māui's fish". Legend recounts that Kupe discovered and explored the region in about the tenth century.

The region was settled by Europeans in 1839 by the New Zealand Company. Wellington became the capital of Wellington Province upon the creation of the province in 1853, until the Abolition of the Provinces Act came into force on 1 Nov 1876. Wellington became capital of New Zealand in 1865, the third capital after Russell and Auckland.

== Geography ==
The region occupies the southern tip of the North Island, bounded to the west, south and east by the sea. To the west lies the Tasman Sea and to the east the Pacific Ocean, the two seas joined by the narrow and turbulent Cook Strait, which is 28 kilometres (17 mi) wide at its narrowest point, between Cape Terawhiti and Perano Head in the Marlborough Sounds.

The region covers 8,049.44 square kilometres (3,107.91 sq mi), and extends north to Ōtaki and almost to Eketāhuna in the east. Physically and topologically the region has four areas running roughly parallel along a northeast–southwest axis:

- The Kāpiti Coast, a narrow strip of coastal plain running north from Paekākāriki towards Foxton. It contains numerous small towns, many of which gain at least a proportion of their wealth from tourism, largely due to their fine beaches.
- Rough hill country inland from the Kāpiti Coast, formed along the same major geologic fault responsible for the Southern Alps in the South Island. Though nowhere near as mountainous as the alps, the Remutaka and Tararua ranges are still hard country and support only small populations, although it is in small coastal valleys and plains at the southern end of these ranges that the cities of Wellington and the Hutt Valley are located.
- The undulating hill country of the Wairarapa around the Ruamāhanga River, which becomes lower and flatter in the south and terminates in the wetlands around Lake Wairarapa and contains much rich farmland.
- Rough hill country, lower than the Tararua Range but far less economic than the land around the Ruamāhanga River. This and the other hilly striation are still largely forested.
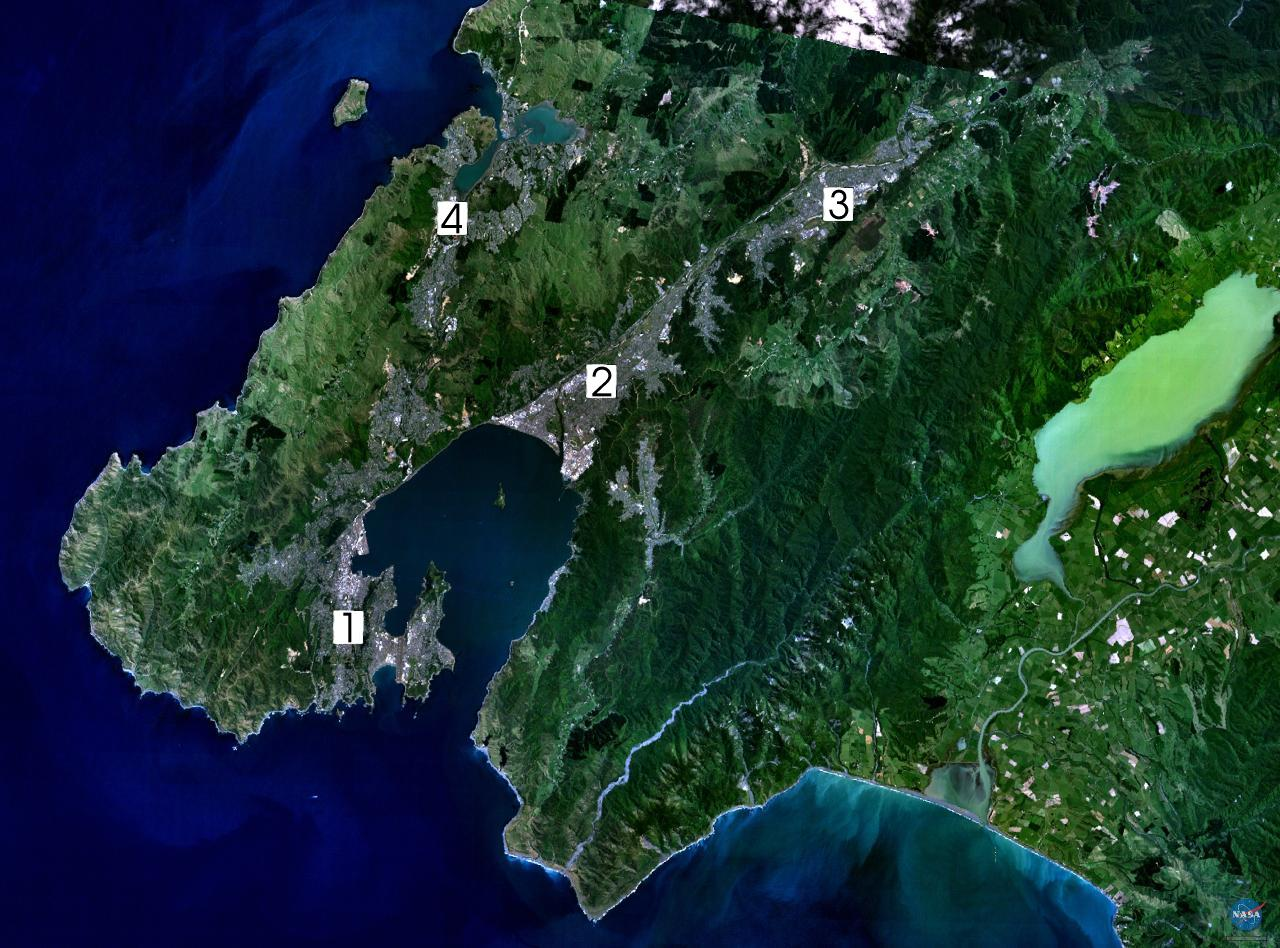
A composite Landsat 7 image of the southwestern part of the region

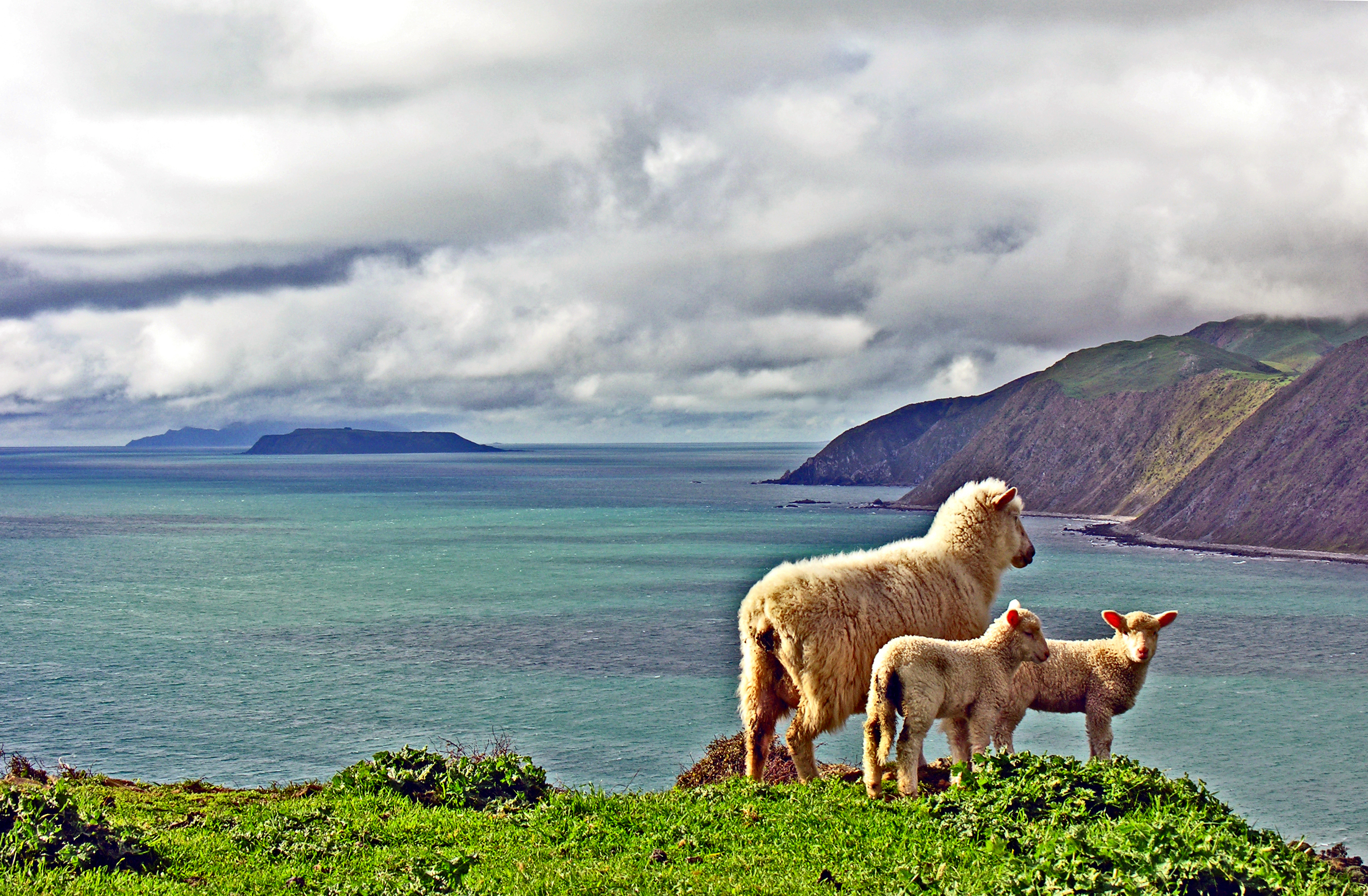
On the Quartz Hill track

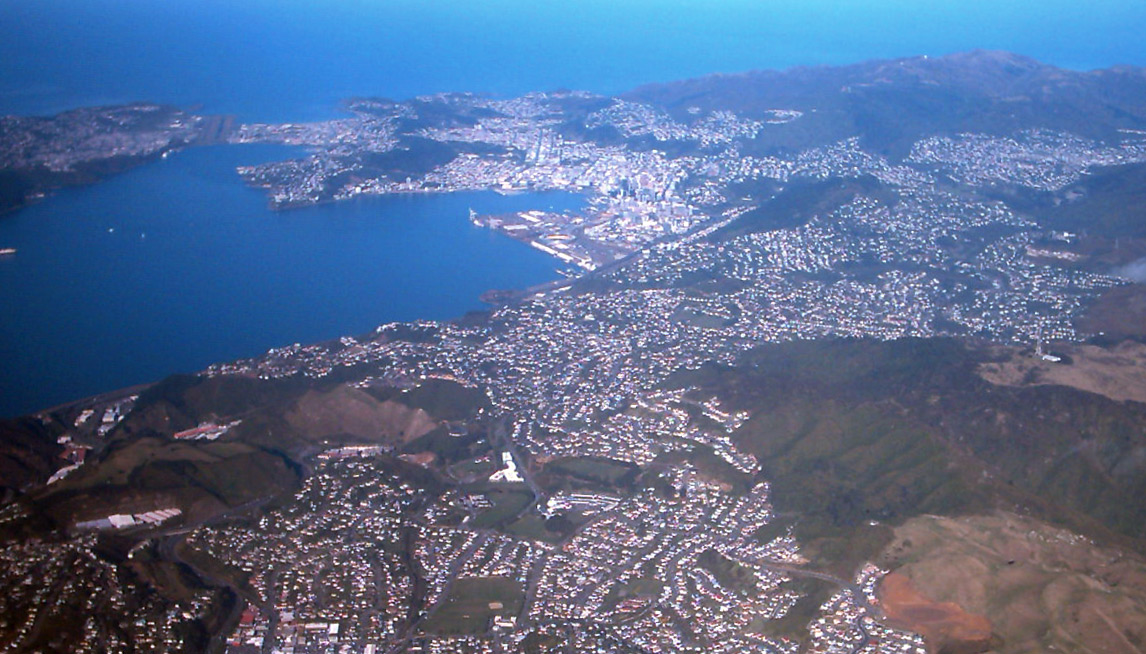
Aerial view of Wellington city

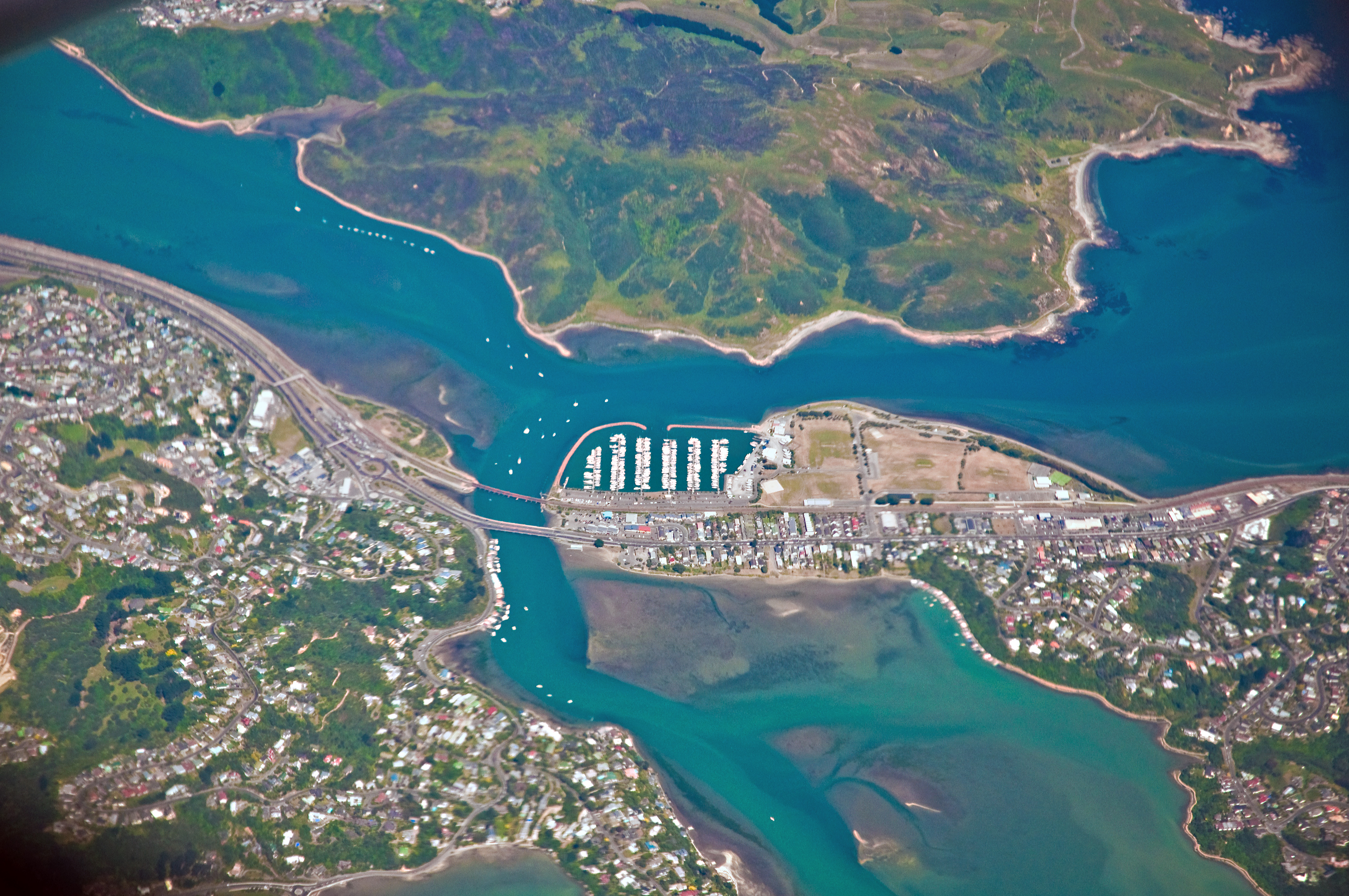
Plimmerton, Paremata and Pauatahanui Inlet

=== Biodiversity ===
Southern bull kelp at Manurewa Point in the Wairarapa

From 2005 to 2015 there has been increase in the variety and number of native forest bird species, as well as an increase in the range of areas inhabited by these species, in Greater Wellington.

== Demographics ==
Wellington Region had an estimated population of 543,400 as of June 2025, with a population density of 68 people per km^{2}.

Historical population
Year	Pop.	±% p.a.
1991	400,284	—
1996	414,048	+0.68%
2001	423,765	+0.47%
2006	448,959	+1.16%
2013	471,315	+0.70%
2018	506,814	+1.46%
2023	520,971	+0.55%

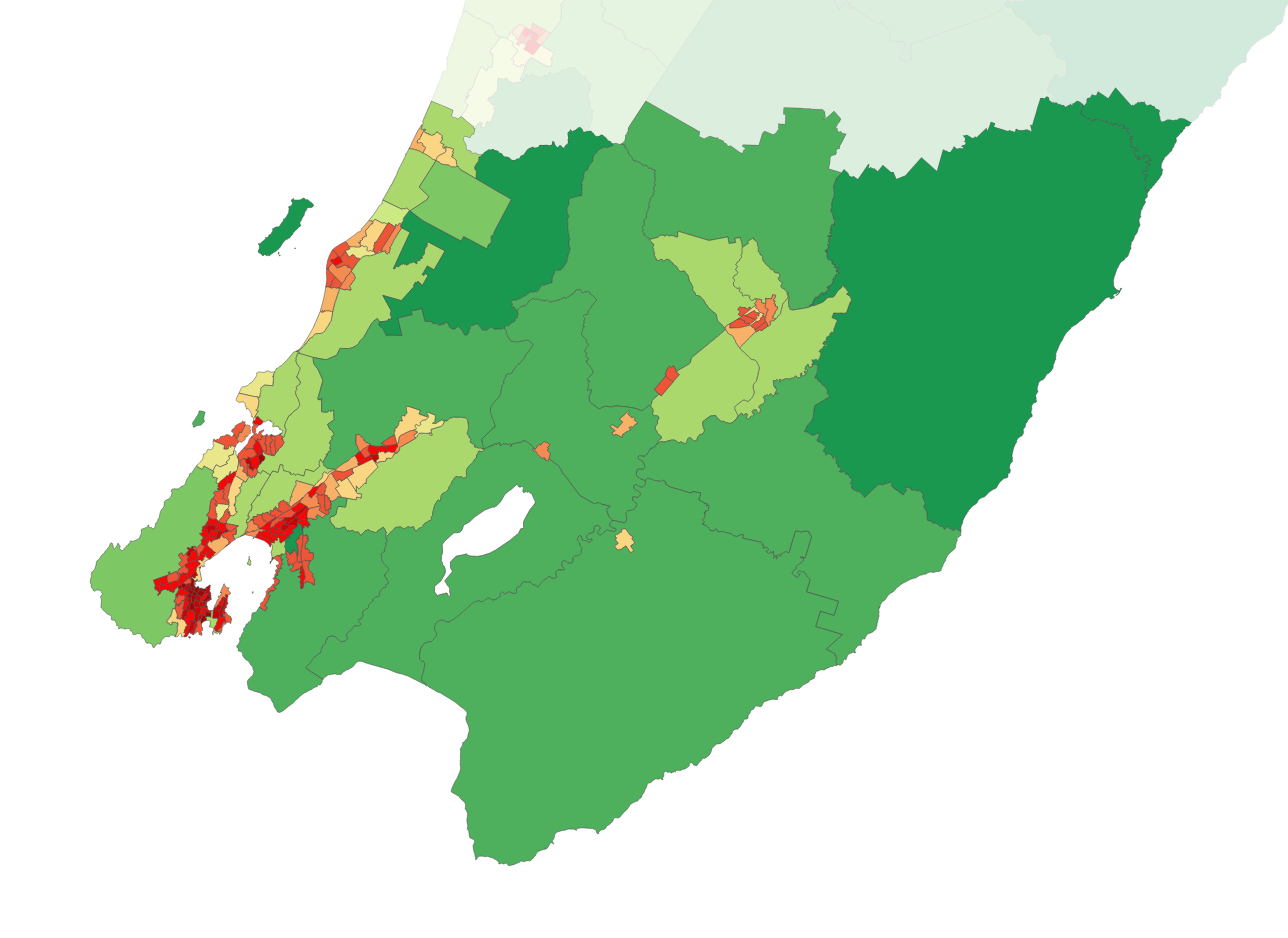
Population density at the 2023 census

Wellington region had a population of 520,971 in the 2023 New Zealand census, an increase of 14,157 people (2.8%) since the 2018 census, and an increase of 49,656 people (10.5%) since the 2013 census. There were 253,278 males, 263,691 females and 4,002 people of other genders in 196,230 dwellings. 5.7% of people identified as LGBTIQ+. The median age was 37.9 years (compared with 38.1 years nationally). There were 89,685 people (17.2%) aged under 15 years, 109,104 (20.9%) aged 15 to 29, 241,272 (46.3%) aged 30 to 64, and 80,916 (15.5%) aged 65 or older.

Of those at least 15 years old, 113,526 (26.3%) people had a bachelor's or higher degree, 199,524 (46.3%) had a post-high school certificate or diploma, and 82,521 (19.1%) people exclusively held high school qualifications.

Individual territorial authorities
Name	Area (km^{2})	Population	Density (per km^{2})	Dwellings	Median age	Median income
Kapiti Coast District	731.52	55,914	76.4	23,097	48.8 years	$39,100
Porirua City	174.80	59,445	340.1	19,134	35.9 years	$47,200
Upper Hutt City	539.88	45,759	84.8	16,890	39.1 years	$48,600
Lower Hutt City	376.40	107,562	285.8	39,279	37.5 years	$47,800
Wellington City	289.91	202,689	699.1	77,835	34.9 years	$55,500
Masterton District	2,300.21	27,678	12.0	10,911	42.7 years	$37,200
Carterton District	1179.91	10,107	8.6	4,116	48.4 years	$37,800
South Wairarapa District	2387.76	11,811	4.9	4,953	47.5 years	$42,800
Tararua District (part)	69.09	6	0.1	3	–	–
Wellington region	8,049.44	520,971	64.7	196,230	37.9 years	$48,700

=== Urban areas ===
Over three-quarters of the 543,400 people (June 2025) reside in the four cities at the southwestern corner. Other main centres of population are on the Kāpiti Coast and in the fertile farming areas close to the upper Ruamāhanga River in the Wairarapa.

Along the Kāpiti Coast, numerous small towns sit close together, many of them occupying spaces close to popular beaches. From the north, these include Ōtaki, Waikanae, Paraparaumu, the twin settlements of Raumati Beach and Raumati South, Paekākāriki and Pukerua Bay, the latter being a northern suburb of Porirua. Each of these settlements has a population of between 2,000 and 10,000, making this moderately heavily populated.

In the Wairarapa the largest community by a considerable margin is Masterton, with a population of over 20,000. Other towns include Featherston, Martinborough, Carterton and Greytown.

Urban area	Population (June 2025)	% of region
Wellington	209,800	38.6%
Lower Hutt	113,200	20.8%
Porirua	60,100	11.1%
Upper Hutt	44,500	8.2%
Paraparaumu	29,900	5.5%
Masterton	22,600	4.2%
Waikanae	13,600	2.5%
Carterton	5,930	1.1%
Ōtaki	5,260	1.0%
Greytown	2,840	0.5%
Featherston	2,870	0.5%
Ōtaki Beach	2,230	0.4%
Martinborough	1,900	0.3%
Paekākāriki	1,740	0.3%

=== Income and employment ===
The median income as of the 2023 census was $48,700, compared with $41,500 nationally. 78,597 people (18.2%) earned over $100,000 compared to 12.1% nationally. The employment status of those at least 15 was that 236,730 (54.9%) people were employed full-time, 57,411 (13.3%) were part-time, and 12,573 (2.9%) were unemployed.

=== Culture and identity ===
Largest groups of overseas-born residents
Nationality	Population (2018)
England	29,043
India	11,334
China	8,664
Australia	8,400
Samoa	7,410
Philippines	6,642
South Africa	6,435
United States	4,581
Fiji	4,047
Scotland	3,843

People could identify as more than one ethnicity. The results in the 2023 census were 72.6% European (Pākehā); 15.5% Māori; 9.1% Pasifika; 15.2% Asian; 2.3% Middle Eastern, Latin American and African New Zealanders (MELAA); and 2.2% other, which includes people giving their ethnicity as "New Zealander". English was spoken by 96.2%, Māori language by 3.9%, Samoan by 2.8% and other languages by 17.2%. No language could be spoken by 2.0% (e.g. too young to talk). New Zealand Sign Language was known by 0.6%. The percentage of people born overseas was 28.1, compared with 28.8% nationally.

Religious affiliations were 31.1% Christian, 3.0% Hindu, 1.3% Islam, 0.7% Māori religious beliefs, 1.2% Buddhist, 0.5% New Age, 0.2% Jewish, and 1.7% other religions. People who answered that they had no religion were 54.3%, and 6.1% of people did not answer the census question.

In the 2013 census, around 25.3 percent of the Wellington Region's population was born overseas, second only to Auckland (39.1 percent) and on par with the New Zealand average (25.2 percent). The British Isles is the largest region of origin, accounting for 36.5 percent of the overseas-born population in the region. Significantly, the Wellington Region is home to over half of New Zealand's Tokelauan-born population.

Catholicism was the largest Christian denomination in Wellington with 14.8 percent affiliating, while Anglicanism was the second-largest with 11.9 percent affiliating. Hinduism (2.4 percent) and Buddhism (1.6 percent) were the largest non-Christian religions in the 2013 census.

== Economy ==
The subnational gross domestic product (GDP) of the Wellington Region was estimated at NZ$39.00 billion in the year to March 2019, 12.9% of New Zealand's national GDP. The subnational GDP per capita was estimated at $74,251 in the same period, the highest of all New Zealand regions. In the year to March 2018, primary industries contributed $389 million (1.0%) to the regional GDP, goods-producing industries contributed $5.93 billion (15.9%), service industries contributed $27.84 billion (74.5%), and taxes and duties contributed $3.20 billion (8.6%).

== Culture ==
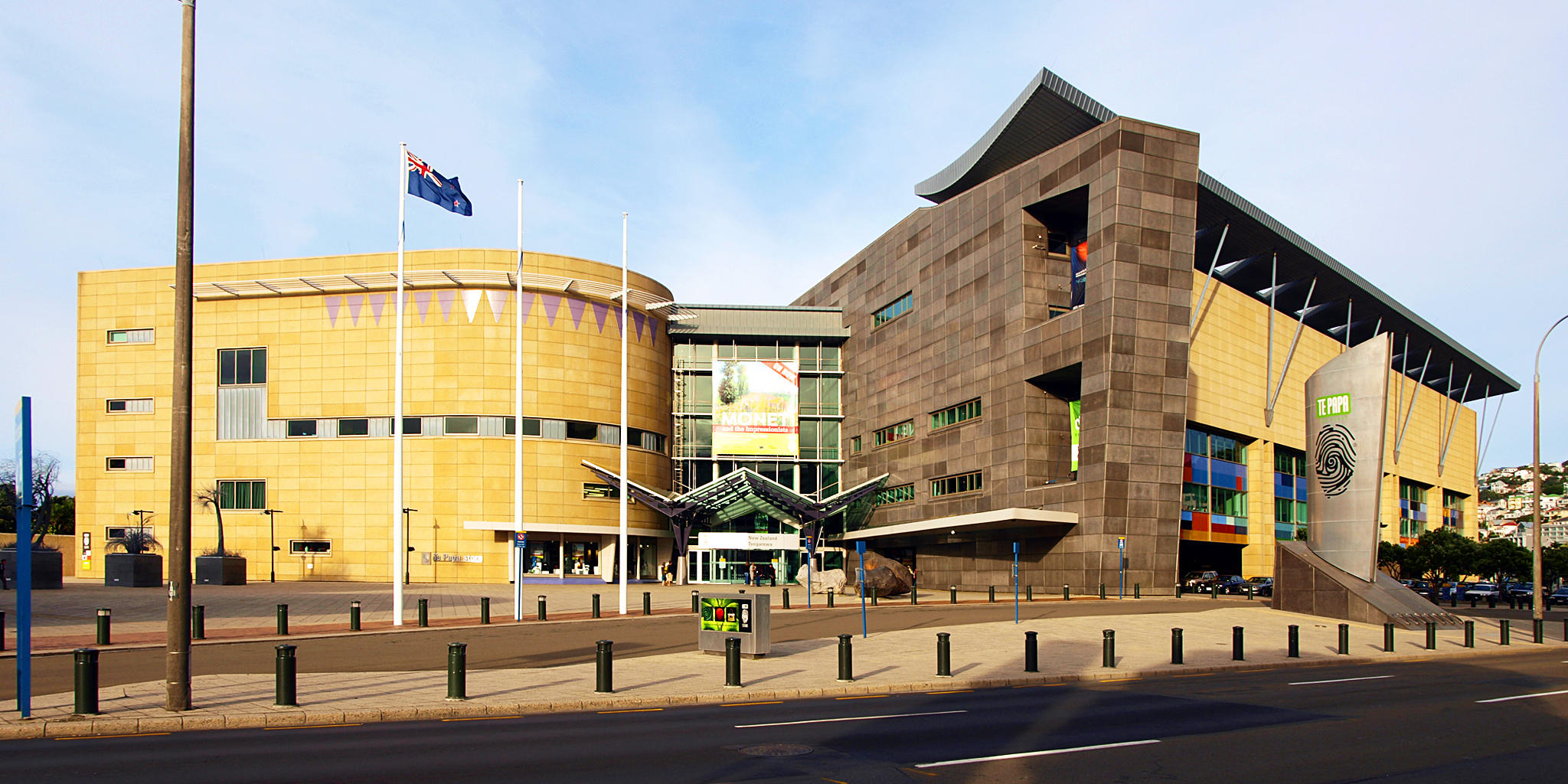
Te Papa, National Museum of New Zealand

Key cultural institutions include Te Papa in Wellington, the Dowse Art Museum in Lower Hutt, and Pataka museum and gallery in Porirua.

== Transport ==
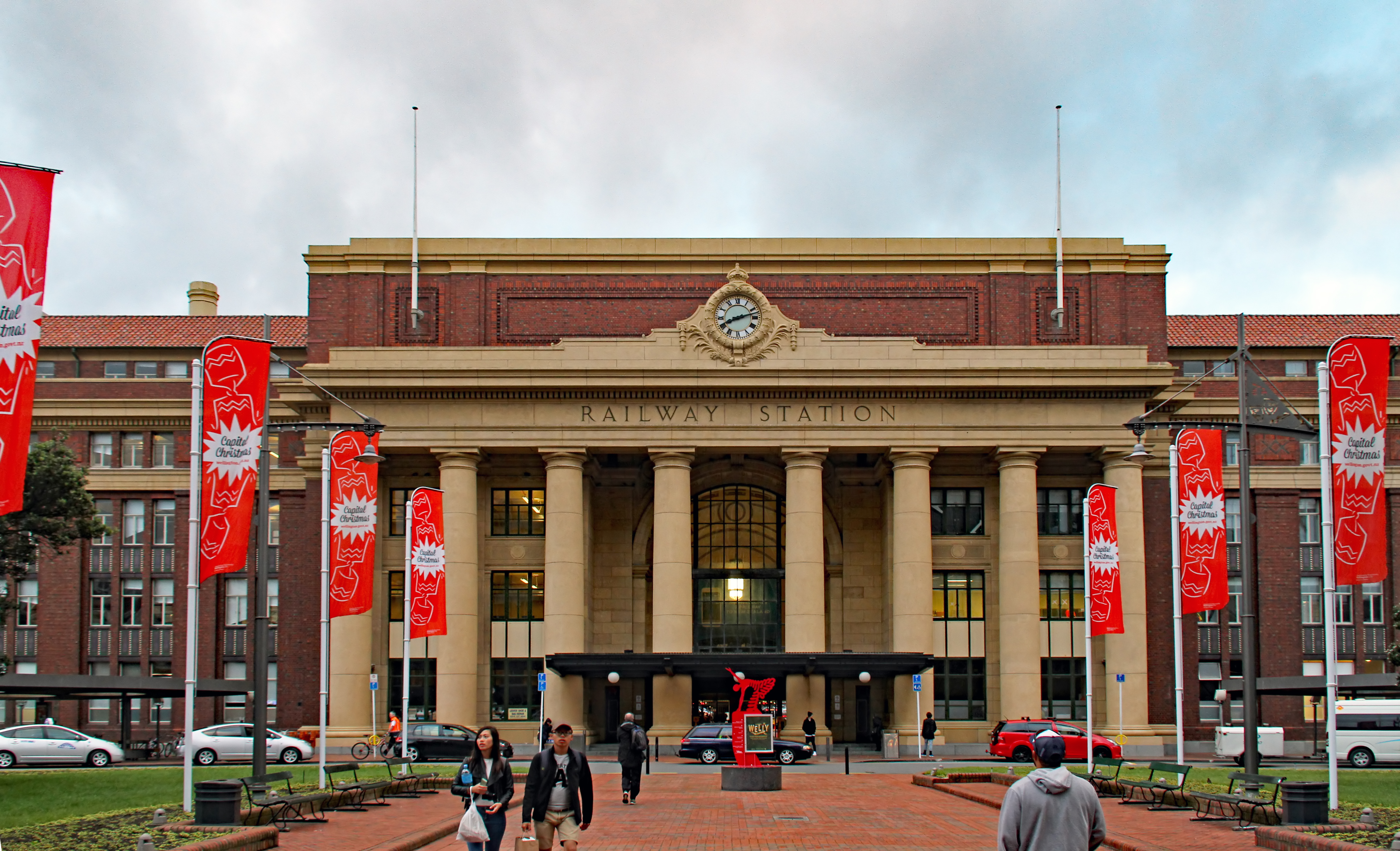
Wellington Railway Station

Public transport in the region is well developed compared to other parts of New Zealand. It consists of buses, trains, cars, ferries and a funicular (the Wellington Cable Car). It also included trams until 1964 and trolleybuses until 2018. Buses and ferries are privately owned, with the infrastructure owned by public bodies, and public transport is often subsidised. The Regional Council is responsible for planning and subsidising public transport. The services are marketed under the name Metlink. Transdev Wellington operates the metropolitan train network, running from the Wellington CBD as far as Waikanae in the north and Masterton in the east. In the year to June 2015, 36.41 million trips were made by public transport with passengers travelling a combined 460.7 million kilometres, equal to 73 trips and 927 km per capita.

The Wellington Region has the lowest rate of car ownership in New Zealand; 11.7 percent of households at the 2013 census did not have access to a car, compared to 7.9 percent for the whole of New Zealand. The number of households with more than one car is also the lowest: 44.4 percent compared to 54.5 percent nationally.

The main port in the region is located in Wellington Harbour. CentrePort Wellington manages cargo passing through the port including containers, logs, vehicles and other bulk cargo. Fuel imports are managed at wharves at Seaview and Miramar. The company also leases wharf facilities to the Interislander and Bluebridge ferry services which operate across Cook Strait between Wellington and Picton in the South Island, and it provides support for cruise ships that visit Wellington each year. CentrePort is majority-owned by Greater Wellington Regional Council, with a 77% shareholding.

== See also ==
- List of people from Wellington
- List of rivers of Wellington Region
- Wairarapa
- Wellington City Council
