= 1918 Wellington Central by-election =

New Zealand by-election

- 3 October 1918
- Turnout: 4,750 (51.76%)
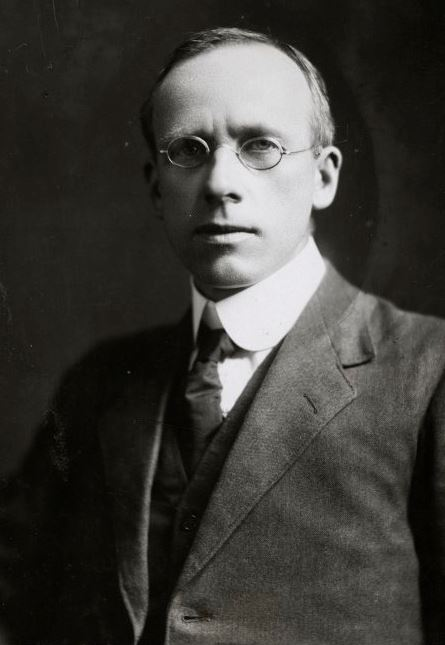

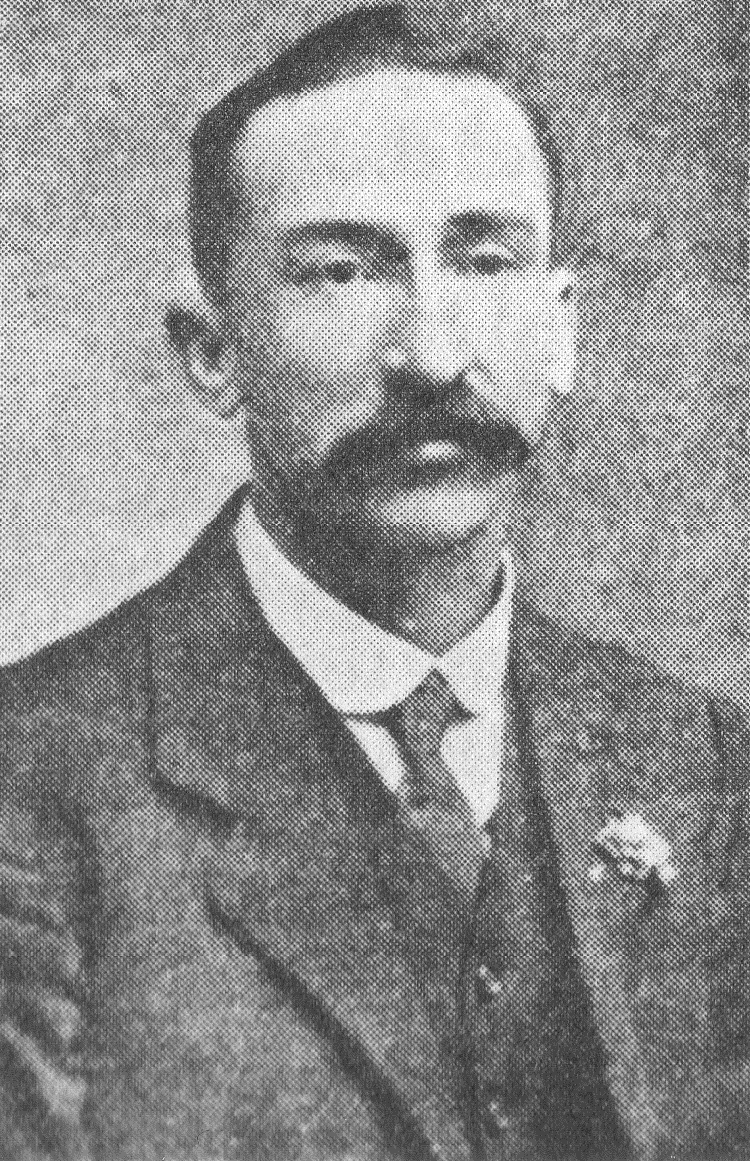

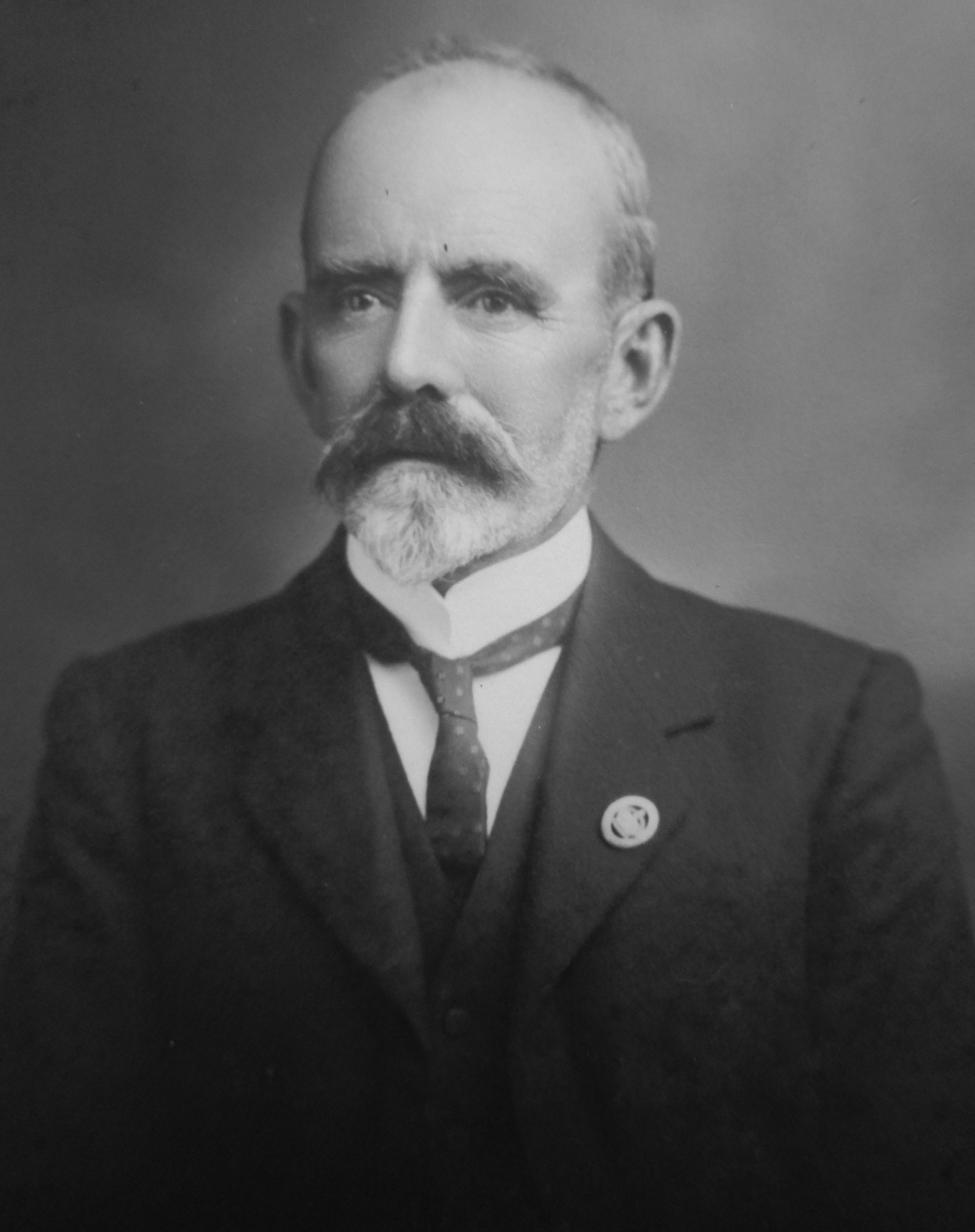

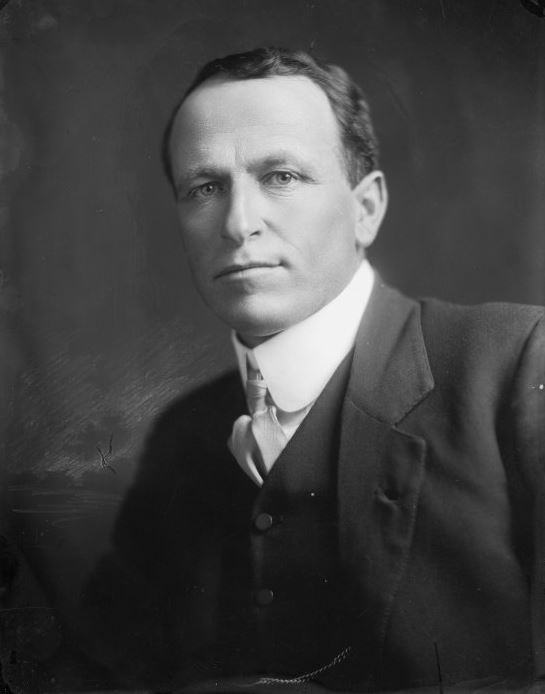
Candidate	Peter Fraser	Joe Mack
Party	Labour	Independent Labour
Popular vote	2,660	1,046
Percentage	56.00%	22.02%
Candidate	William Hildreth	Harry Atmore
Party	Liberal	Independent
Popular vote	783	185
Percentage	16.48%	3.89%
Member before election
Robert Fletcher
Liberal
Elected Member
Peter Fraser
Labour

The Wellington Central by-election of 1918 was a by-election held in the Wellington Central electorate during the 19th New Zealand Parliament, on 3 October 1918. It was caused by the death of incumbent MP Robert Fletcher of the Liberal Party and was won by Peter Fraser with a majority of 1,624.

== Candidates ==
=== Coalition government ===
The Wartime Coalition government between the Reform Party and Liberal Party sought to retain the seat, though were anxious of their chances of retaining an urban electorate following their narrow win in the Wellington North by-election several months earlier. Under the terms of the coalition agreement between Reform and the Liberal's a condition was made not to oppose each other in by-elections for deceased or retiring MP's from their own parties. Several candidates were approached for the Liberal nomination and eventually William Hildreth, a Wellington City Councillor was selected and endorsed by acting-Prime Minister James Allen.

=== Labour Party ===
The Labour Party had supported Robert Fletcher (a left winger amongst the Liberals) in the 1911 and 1914 elections, but decided to contest the election for his vacated seat themselves. Labour were confident following a near victory in the Wellington North by-election earlier in the year. There were three contestants for the Labour Party nomination Peter Fraser, John Read and Michael Reardon. Fraser was selected as the official Labour candidate and had a large local following. Fraser had gained much notability after spending one year in jail for sedition after speaking out against the war and conscription. Even on his release he was still a prominent critic of the government.

=== Others ===
Joe Mack stood as an independent Labour candidate. He was a moderate amongst the union movement and unlike most others he supported both the war effort and conscription. To many observers, Mack represented "sane Labour" due to his distance from the radical views held by many socialists at the time. His candidature was put forward by the Protestant Political Association of New Zealand claiming him to be a patriotic individual and not a "Bolshevik" like many of his union colleagues.

== Previous election ==
1914 general election: Wellington Central
Party	Candidate	Votes	%	±%
Liberal	Robert Fletcher	5,208	64.40	
Reform	Frank Fisher	2,879	35.60	
Majority		2,329	28.80	
Informal votes		84	1.03	
Turnout		8,171	84.47	
Registered electors		9,673		
Liberal gain from Reform		Swing		

== Results ==
The following table gives the election results:

1918 Wellington Central by-election
Party	Candidate	Votes	%	±%
Labour	Peter Fraser	2,660	56.00	
Independent Labour	Joe Mack	1,046	22.02	
Liberal	William Hildreth	783	16.48	
Independent	Harry Atmore	185	3.89	
Independent	Lindsay Garmson	29	0.61	
Independent	Cyril Tanner	8	0.16	
Informal votes		39	0.82	
Majority		1,614	33.97	
Turnout		4,750	51.76	−32.71
Registered electors		9,176		
Labour gain from Liberal		Swing		
