= Janet Fraser =

New Zealand community leader

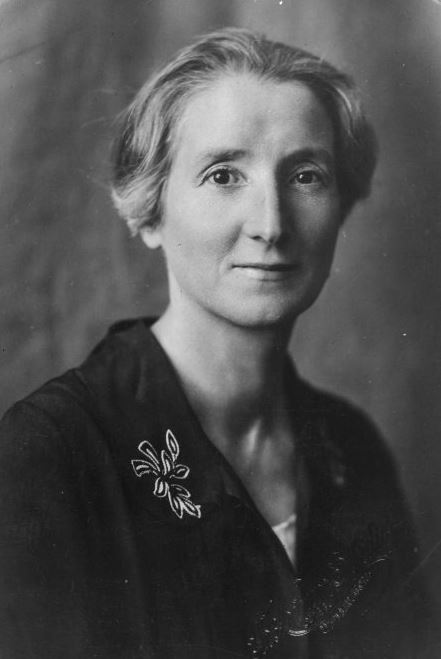
- Fraser in 1923

Spouse of the Prime Minister of New Zealand
- In role 27 March 1940 – 7 March 1945
- Preceded by: Emma Serena Forbes
- Succeeded by: Florence Beatrice Holland

Personal details
- Born: Janet Munro; 31 January 1883 Glasgow, Scotland
- Died: 7 March 1945 (aged 62) Wellington, New Zealand
- Spouses: Frederick Kemp (m. 1903; div. 1919) Peter Fraser (m. 1919)
- Children: 1 (with Frederick Kemp)
- Occupation: Community leader

Janet Fraser (formerly Kemp, née Munro; 31 January 1883 – 7 March 1945) was a New Zealand community leader and the wife of Peter Fraser, who was the 24th prime minister of New Zealand (1940–1949) during and after the Second World War. She was born in Glasgow, Lanarkshire, Scotland, on 31 January 1883.

== Biography ==
Fraser grew up and was educated in Glasgow where she taught orphans and had been influenced by the writings of Robert Blatchford. Janet sometimes used her maternal grandmother's surname, Henderson, as a middle name. She married Frederick George Kemp on 25 November 1903. She left for Auckland, New Zealand, in 1909 with her first husband, Frederick George Kemp and her son, Harold.

In Wellington, she met Peter Fraser in 1911, whom she worked with during the flu epidemic in 1918. After her divorce from Kemp on 4 October 1919, she married Peter Fraser on 1 November 1919. Fraser donated much of her time to child welfare and health issues in New Zealand spending 10 years on the Wellington Hospital Board. She was awarded the King George V Silver Jubilee Medal in 1935.

In the late 1930s, Fraser recommended efforts to help pregnant women have access to pain medication during childbirth.

When her husband became prime minister of New Zealand in 1940, she traveled with him and acted as a "political adviser, researcher, gatekeeper and personal support system."

During World War II, she was in charge of the official women's war effort and brought Polish refugee children to New Zealand. In August 1943, she greeted Eleanor Roosevelt on her visit to New Zealand.

Janet Fraser died on 7 March 1945 in Wellington, and was buried at Karori Cemetery.

== Honours ==
In 2021, Janet Fraser and Peter Fraser, in recognition of their help for Polish children, were awarded by the President of Poland with Virtus et Fraternitas Medal.
