= Canberra Pact =

1944 treaty between Australia and New Zealand

Australia-New Zealand Agreement
- Peter Fraser signing, with John Curtin (right) and H. V. Evatt (left).
- Type: Bilateral treaty
- Signed: January 21, 1944
- Location: Canberra, Australia
- Effective: June 21, 1944
- Signatories: John Curtin; Peter Fraser
- Parties: Australia; New Zealand
- Languages: English

The Canberra Pact, formally the Australian-New Zealand Agreement, also known as the ANZAC Pact, was a treaty of mutual co-operation between the governments of Australia and New Zealand, signed on 21 January 1944, following a conference that began on the 17th. The Pact was not a military alliance, but aimed to support Australian and New Zealand interests in the postwar world, particularly in the South Pacific. It was the "first clear and unmistakable statement of the two Dominion's postwar interests", and Alister McIntosh described it as having "said the right things in somewhat the wrong way".

== Background ==
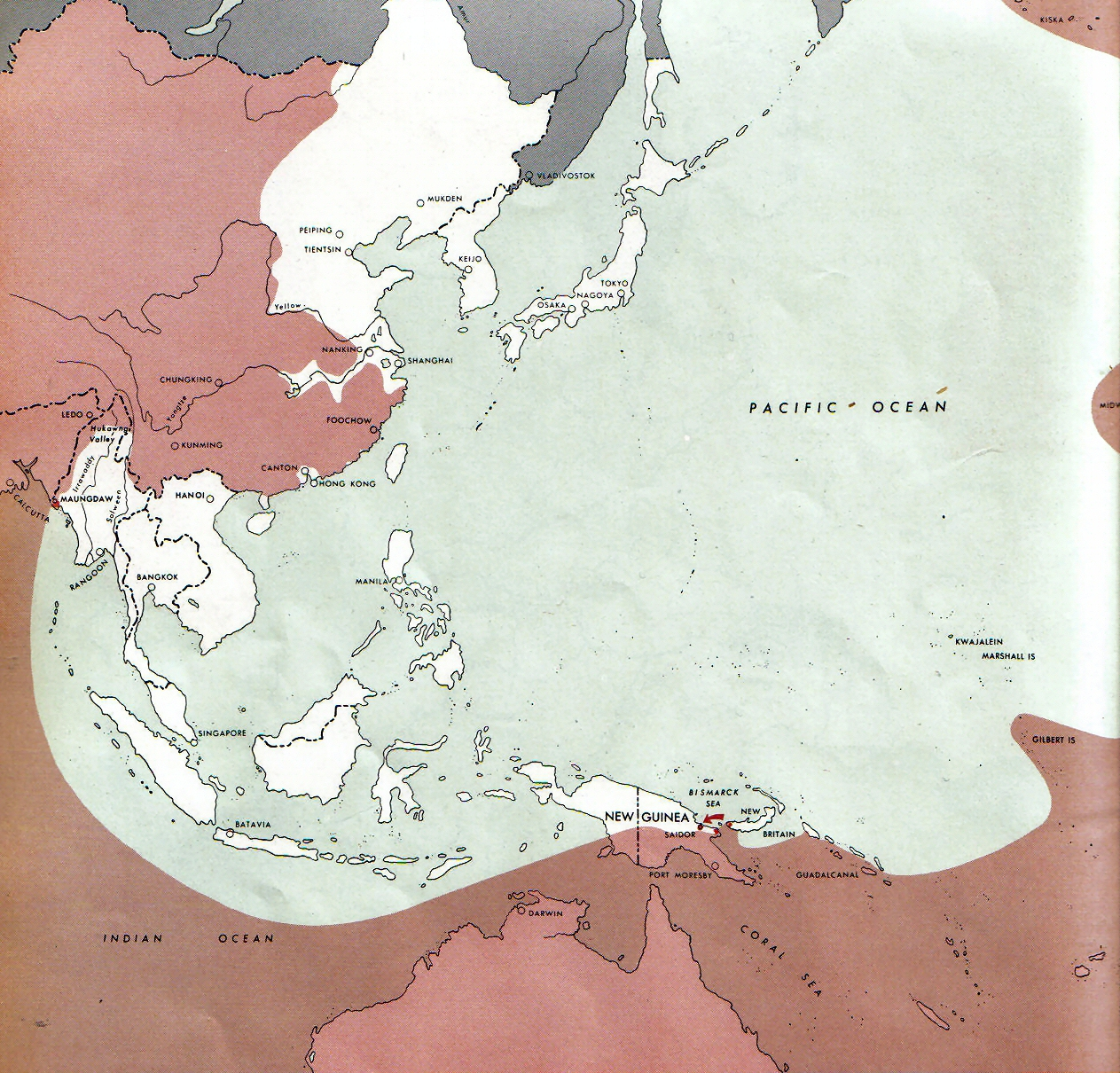
The situation in the Pacific in mid January 1944

H. V. Evatt, the Australian Minister of External Affairs, had criticized the 1943 Cairo Declaration for disposing of Japanese territories in the northern Pacific without consultation or warning to Australia and New Zealand. Evatt wanted to establish Australia as the dominant power in the South Pacific; taking over British colonies in the western Pacific and assuming undefined security responsibilities for Portuguese Timor and the Netherlands East Indies. Given Britain's weakness, the alternative was the United States. Evatt is credited with initiating the discussions which led to the agreement.

For both nations, the pact was the first treaty negotiated independently.

The pact was ratified by the Australian government on 21 January, and by the New Zealand government on 1 February.

== Articles ==
The pact consisted of forty four clauses, summarised as follows:

- The governments pledged to support a post-war "general system of world security" within the framework of what would become the United Nations.
- The governments agreed that there should be a "a regional zone of defence comprising the South West and South Pacific areas shall be established and that this zone should be based on Australia and New Zealand, stretching through the arc of islands North and North East of Australia, to Western Samoa and the Cook Islands."
- The governments cited the trusteeship practice as "applicable in broad principle to all colonial territories in the Pacific".
- The governments proposed the establishment of an advisory South Seas Regional Commission, to secure common policy between the eighteen different jurisdictions in the South Pacific and aid "social, economic, and political development" for the native populations.
- The governments agreed to closer political and economic ties in the future, establishing a permanent secretariat between them. And they agreed to "act together in maters of common interest" on issues in the South Pacific.
- The governments recognised the principle that use of military bases during the war does not transfer territorial claims or rights of sovereignty after the end of hostilities.
- The governments agreed to act jointly with regards to post-war civil aviation.

== Aftermath ==
The pact received mixed reactions worldwide and domestically. In Canada and the United Kingdom, the agreement was well received with Prime Minister of Canada William Lyon Mackenzie King calling it "an illuminating example of a flexible and effective method of co-operation between countries of the British Commonwealth" and the British Secretary of State for Dominion Affairs Robert Gascoyne-Cecil, 5th Marquess of Salisbury stating he "cordially welcomed the pact". In New Zealand, the reaction was mixed. Opposition Leader Sidney Holland expressed concerns about how the pact was ratified without first a consultation with Parliament, while the press in both Australia and New Zealand pointed out potential issues arising from the fact that neither the United Kingdom, United States, or the Soviet Union were approached before the pact was signed; Keith Murdoch stated the pact implied an attitude towards the Americans of "derision, ridicule, and even bitter hostility".

The United States opposed the Canberra Pact as it was made without their consultation, and the pact clearly outlined strategic boundaries in the Pacific, which the United States regarded as imposing on their sphere of interest. The prime ministers of New Zealand, Peter Fraser, and Australia, John Curtin, were subjected to a very demeaning dressing-down by Secretary of State Cordell Hull as a sign of American displeasure. In addition, New Zealand's armed forces in the Pacific theatre of operations were effectively sidelined as a result.

Secretariats were established in each Department of External Affairs, with in New Zealand Alister McIntosh telling his staff that exchanges could go through Carl Berendsen the New Zealand High Commissioner in Australia or direct to the Australian Government but definitely not through D'Alton, the Australian High Commissioner in New Zealand (who was a political appointment). Initially the two governments were in closer touch than they had ever been before, or possibly have been since.

Prime Minister Walter Nash, writing in 1965, believed that fears expressed by Cordell Hull were ultimately unwarranted, since the pact led to greater cooperation between the United States, Australia, and New Zealand on matters of defence as well as political and economic matters. Evidence of this includes the South Pacific Commission, established in 1947, and the 1951 Anzus Treaty, which cemented good relations between the three nations.
