= Joe Mack (unionist) =

New Zealand railway worker & unionist (1867–1951)

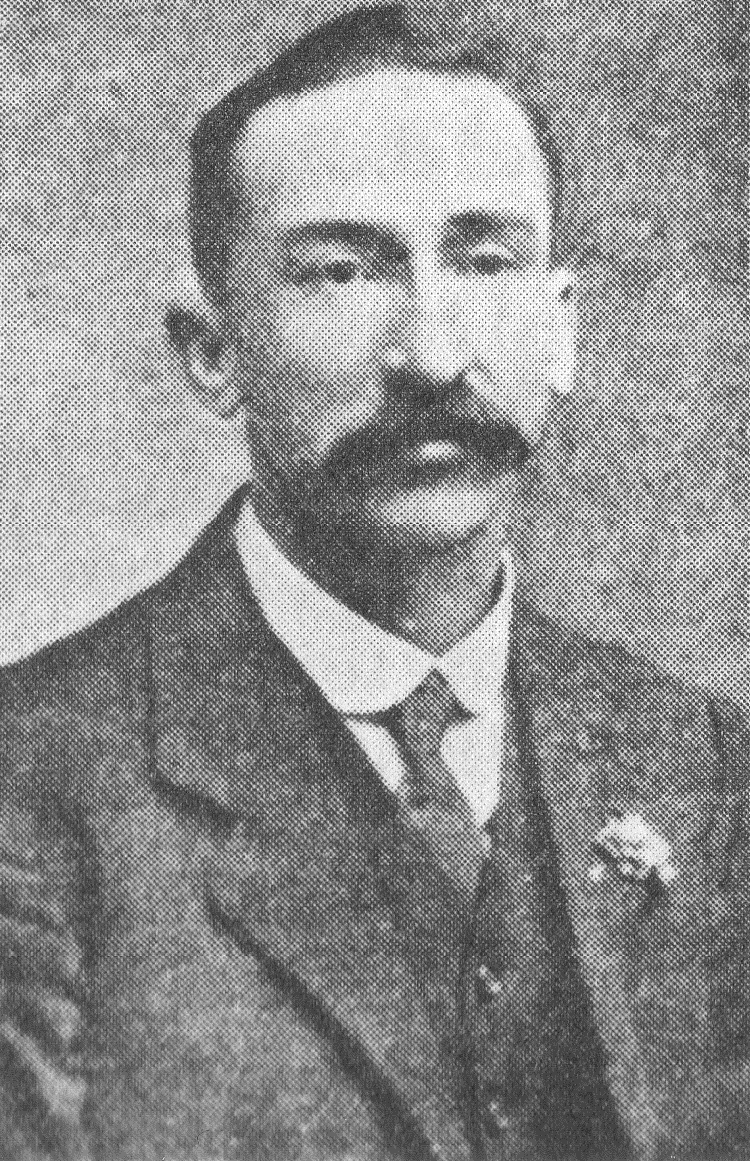
Joe Mack.

Matthew Joseph Mack (3 March 1867 – 18 July 1951) was a New Zealand railway worker and trade unionist.

Mack was born in Wellington, New Zealand on 3 March 1867. He was a railway guard and Secretary of the Amalgamated Society of Railway Servants (1908–27). Mack stood as New Zealand Labour Party candidate for Parnell in 1911 but disliked the party's stance on conscription in World War I. In 1918 he contested the Wellington Central by-election as an Independent Labour-Protestant Political Association candidate and came a very creditable runner-up to Labour's Peter Fraser. Mack was President of the Alliance of Labour in 1924.
