= Peter Fraser =

Prime Minister of New Zealand from 1940 to 1949

The Right Honourable Peter Fraser CH
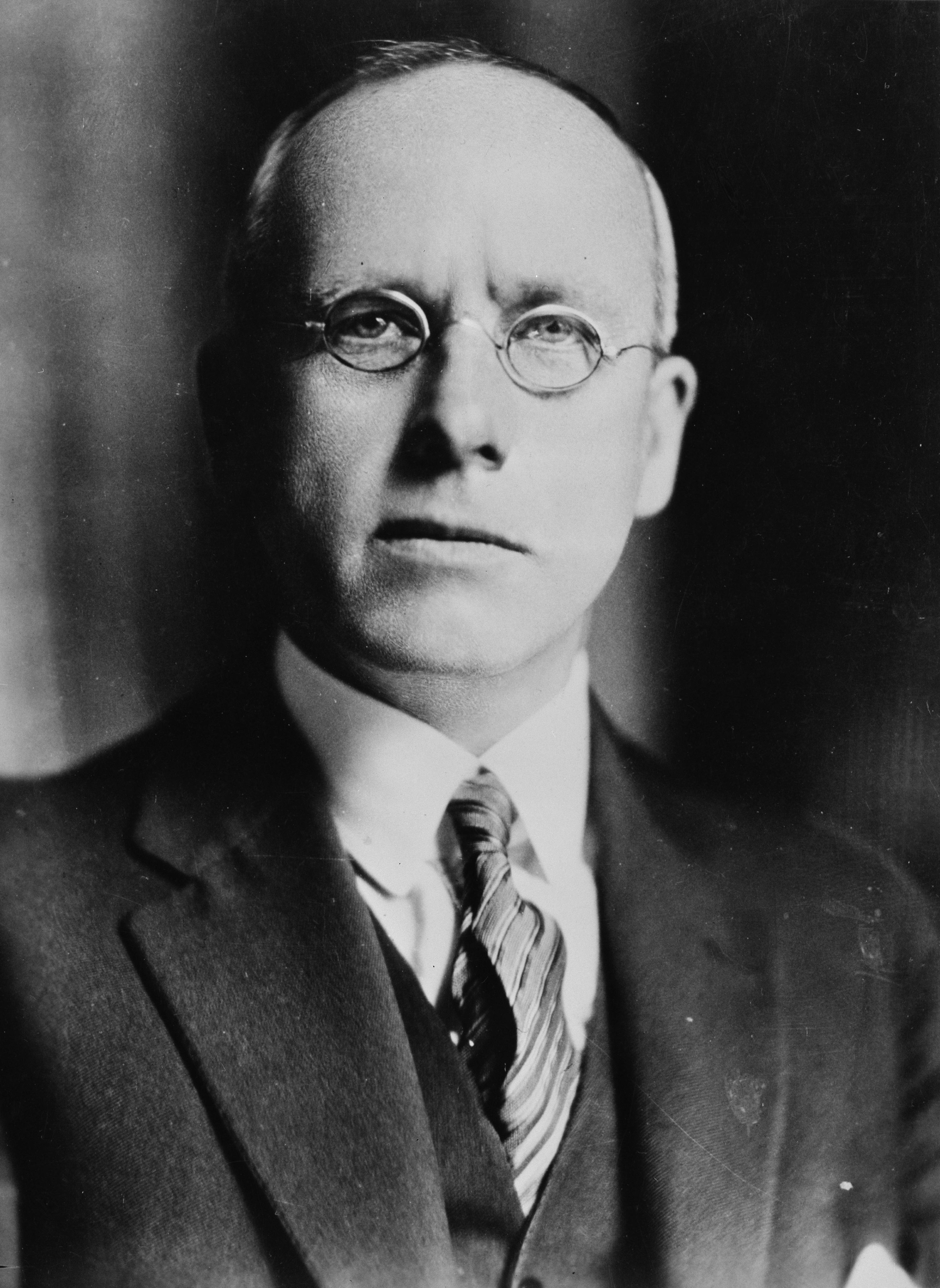
- Fraser c. 1942

24th Prime Minister of New Zealand
- In office 27 March 1940 – 13 December 1949
- Monarch: George VI
- Governor-General: The Viscount Galway; Cyril Newall; Bernard Freyberg
- Preceded by: Michael Joseph Savage
- Succeeded by: Sidney Holland

15th Leader of the Opposition
- In office 13 December 1949 – 12 December 1950
- Prime Minister: Sidney Holland
- Deputy: Walter Nash
- Preceded by: Sidney Holland
- Succeeded by: Walter Nash

4th Leader of the New Zealand Labour Party
- In office 1 April 1940 – 12 December 1950
- Deputy: Walter Nash
- Preceded by: Michael Joseph Savage
- Succeeded by: Walter Nash
Other Ministerial roles
14th Minister of Police
In office 6 December 1935 – 13 December 1949
Prime Minister	Michael Joseph Savage; Himself
Preceded by	John Cobbe
Succeeded by	Sidney Holland
11th Minister of Health
In office 6 December 1935 – 30 April 1940
Prime Minister	Michael Joseph Savage; Himself
Preceded by	Alexander Young
Succeeded by	Tim Armstrong
22nd Minister of Education
In office 6 December 1935 – 30 April 1940
Prime Minister	Michael Joseph Savage; Himself
Preceded by	Sydney Smith
Succeeded by	Rex Mason

4th President of the Labour Party
- In office 12 July 1920 – 15 July 1921
- Vice President: Frederick Cooke
- Preceded by: Tom Paul
- Succeeded by: Frederick Cooke

Member of the New Zealand Parliament for Brooklyn
- In office 27 November 1946 – 12 December 1950
- Preceded by: seat created
- Succeeded by: Arnold Nordmeyer

Member of the New Zealand Parliament for Wellington Central
- In office 3 October 1918 – 27 November 1946
- Preceded by: Robert Fletcher
- Succeeded by: Charles Chapman

Personal details
- Born: 28 August 1884 Hill of Fearn, Scotland
- Died: 12 December 1950 (aged 66) Wellington, New Zealand
- Party: Labour (1916–50); Social Democratic (1913–16); Socialist (1910–13)
- Spouse: Janet Henderson Munro (m. 1919; died 1945)
- Profession: Stevedore, politician
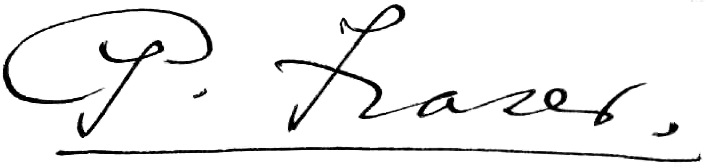
- Signature
- Fraser's voice Fraser speaking on New Zealand's participation in the Battle of Crete. Recorded in 1941

Peter Fraser CH PC (/ˈfreɪzər/; 28 August 1884 – 12 December 1950) was a New Zealand politician who served as the 24th prime minister of New Zealand from 27 March 1940 until 13 December 1949. Considered a major figure in the history of the New Zealand Labour Party, he was in office longer than any other Labour prime minister, and is to date New Zealand's fourth-longest-serving head of government.

Born and raised in the Scottish Highlands, Fraser left education early in order to support his family. While working in London in 1908, Fraser joined the Independent Labour Party, but unemployment led him to emigrate to New Zealand in 1910. On arrival in Auckland, he gained employment as a wharfie and became involved in union politics upon joining the New Zealand Socialist Party. In 1916, Fraser was involved in the foundation of the unified Labour Party. He spent one year in jail for sedition after speaking out against conscription during the First World War. In 1918, Fraser won a Wellington by-election and entered the House of Representatives.

Fraser became a cabinet minister in 1935, serving under Michael Joseph Savage. He held several portfolios and had a particular interest in education, which he considered vital for social reform. As Minister of Health, he introduced the Social Security Act 1938, which established a universal health care service. Fraser became the Leader of the Labour Party and prime minister in 1940, following Savage's death in office.

Fraser is best known for leading the country during the Second World War when he mobilised New Zealand supplies and volunteers to support Britain while boosting the economy and maintaining home front morale. He formed a war cabinet which included several erstwhile political opponents. Labour suffered significant losses in the 1943 election, though the party retained its majority.

Following the war, Fraser was active in the affairs of the 'new' Commonwealth and is credited with increasing New Zealand's international stature. Fraser led his party to its fourth successive election victory in 1946, albeit with a further reduced majority. The after-effects of the war, including ongoing shortages, were affecting his government's popularity. Labour lost the 1949 election and Fraser's government was succeeded by the first National Party government. Almost exactly one year later, Fraser died from a heart attack aged 66.

== Early life ==
A native of Scotland, Peter Fraser was born in Hill of Fearn, a small village near the town of Tain in the Highland area of Easter Ross. He received a basic education, but had to leave school due to his family's poor financial state. Though apprenticed to a carpenter, he eventually abandoned this trade due to extremely poor eyesight – later in life, faced with difficulty reading official documents, he would insist on spoken reports rather than written ones. Before the deterioration of his vision, however, he read extensively – with socialist activists such as Keir Hardie and Robert Blatchford among his favourites.

Becoming politically active in his early teens, he was 16 years old upon attaining the post of secretary of the local Liberal Association, and, eight years later, in 1908, joined the Independent Labour Party.

== Move to New Zealand ==
In another two years, at the age of 26, after unsuccessfully seeking employment in London, Fraser decided to move to New Zealand, having apparently chosen the country in the belief that it possessed a strong progressive spirit.

He gained employment as a stevedore (or "wharfie") on arrival in Auckland, and became involved in union politics upon joining the New Zealand Socialist Party. Fraser worked as campaign manager for Michael Joseph Savage as the Socialist candidate for Auckland Central electorate. He was also involved in the New Zealand Federation of Labour, which he represented at Waihi during the Waihi miners' strike of 1912. He moved to Wellington, the country's capital, shortly afterwards. Savage went on to be Fraser's predecessor in office as the nation's first Labour prime minister.

In 1913, he participated in the founding of the Social Democratic Party and, during the year, within the scope of his union activities, found himself under arrest for breaches of the peace. While the arrest led to no serious repercussions, it did prompt a change of strategy – he moved away from direct action and began to promote a parliamentary route to power.

Upon Britain's entry into the First World War, he strongly opposed New Zealand participation since, sharing the belief of many leftist thinkers, Fraser considered the conflict an "imperialist war", fought for reasons of national interest rather than of principle.

== Foundation of the Labour Party ==
In 1916, Fraser became involved in the foundation of the New Zealand Labour Party, which absorbed much of the moribund Social Democratic Party's membership. The members selected Harry Holland as the Labour Party's leader. Michael Joseph Savage, Fraser's old ally from the New Zealand Socialist Party, also participated.

Later in 1916, the government had Fraser and several other members of the new Labour Party arrested on charges of sedition. This resulted from their outspoken opposition to the war, and particularly their call to abolish conscription. Fraser received a sentence of one year in jail. He always rejected the verdict, claiming he would only have committed subversion had he taken active steps to undermine conscription, rather than merely voicing his disapproval.

After his release from prison, Fraser worked as a journalist for the official Labour Party newspaper. He also resumed his activities within the Labour Party, initially in the role of campaign manager for Harry Holland.

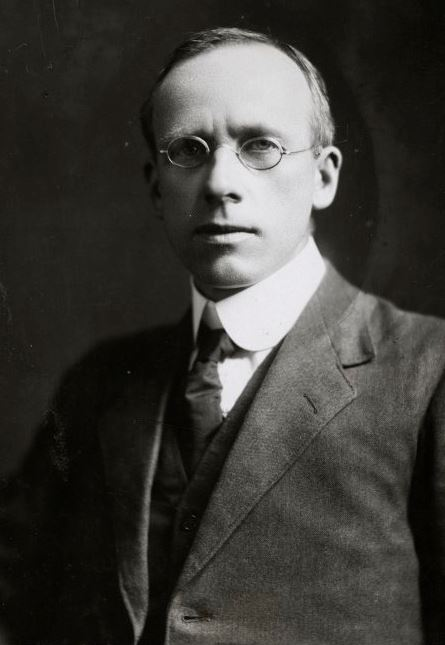
Fraser in 1918

== Local body politics ==
In 1919 Fraser stood on the Labour Party's ticket for the Wellington City Council. He and three others were first Labour candidates to win office on the council since before the war. Fraser led a movement on the council to establish a municipal milk distribution department in Wellington, which was to remain in operation until the 1990s. He was re-elected in 1921, though Labour lost ground only winning two seats. In 1923 Fraser stood for Mayor of Wellington. He adopted an "all or nothing" strategy by standing only for the mayoralty, refusing nomination to stand for the council also. Fraser polled higher than any Labour mayoral candidate in New Zealand history but lost by only 273 votes to Robert Wright in the closest result Wellington had ever seen.

Fraser made a comeback on the council when he was persuaded to stand in a 1933 by-election. Wright was his main opponent and was victorious in a heavy polling contest which was dubbed by the media as a "grudge match" repeat of 1923. Fraser was re-elected to the Council in 1935, topping the poll with more votes than any other candidate. The next year he decided to resign from the council in order to focus on his ministerial duties. A by-election was avoided when Andrew Parlane, also the highest polling unsuccessful candidate from 1935, was the only nominated candidate.

== Early parliamentary career ==
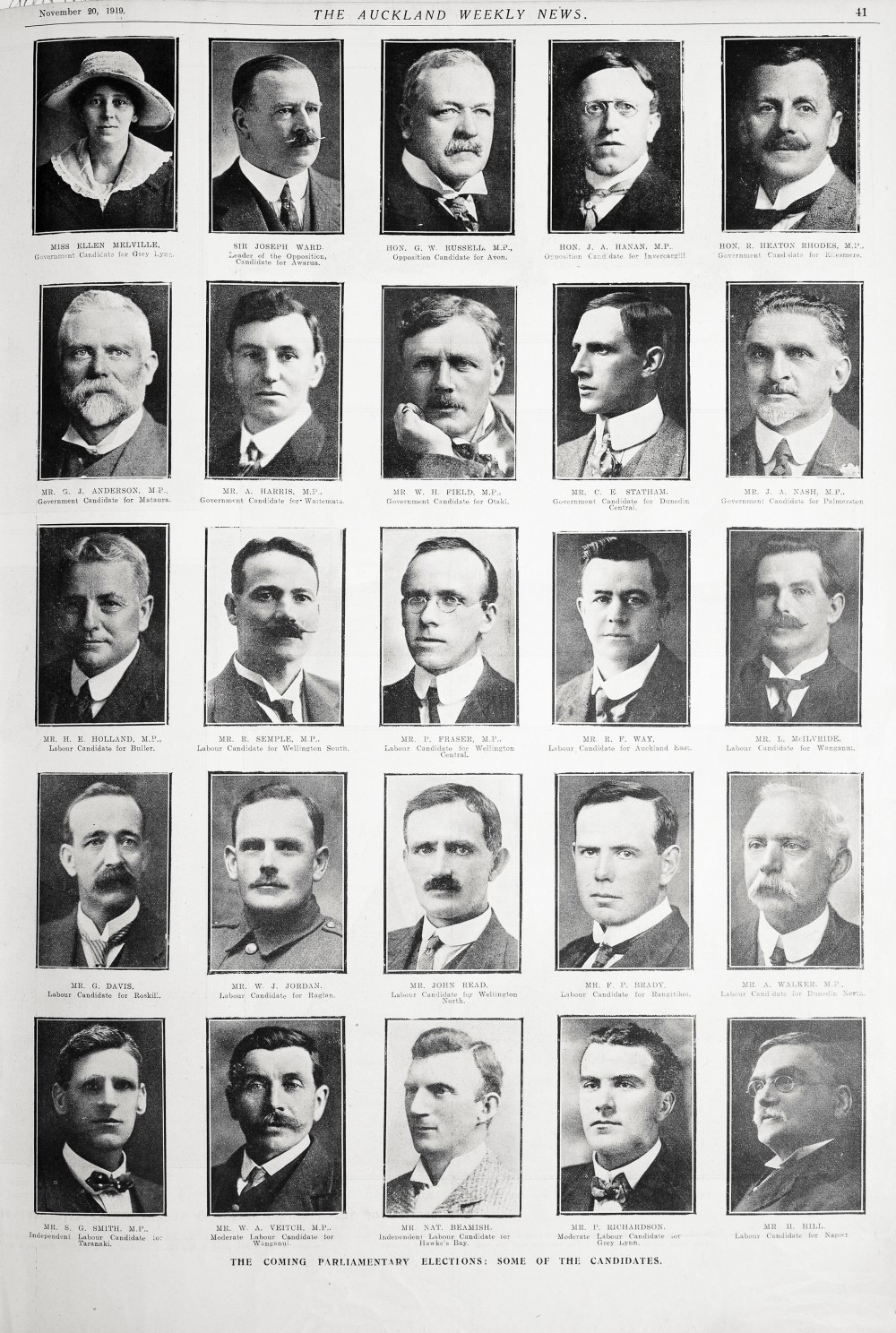
Poster featuring candidates for the 1919 general election, including Peter Fraser (centre)

New Zealand Parliament
Years	Term	Electorate	Party
1918–1919	19th	Wellington Central	Labour
1919–1922	20th	Wellington Central	Labour
1922–1925	21st	Wellington Central	Labour
1925–1928	22nd	Wellington Central	Labour
1928–1931	23rd	Wellington Central	Labour
1931–1935	24th	Wellington Central	Labour
1935–1938	25th	Wellington Central	Labour
1938–1943	26th	Wellington Central	Labour
1943–1946	27th	Wellington Central	Labour
1946–1949	28th	Brooklyn	Labour
1949–1950	29th	Brooklyn	Labour

In a 1918 by-election, Fraser gained election to Parliament, winning the electorate of Wellington Central. He soon distinguished himself through his work to counter the influenza epidemic of 1918–19, of which Fraser was himself a survivor.

During his early years in parliament, Fraser developed a clearer sense of his political beliefs. Although initially enthusiastic about the Russian October Revolution of 1917 and its Bolshevik leaders, he rejected them soon afterwards, and eventually became one of the strongest advocates of excluding communists from the Labour Party. His commitment to parliamentary politics rather than to direct action became firmer, and he had a moderating influence on many Labour Party policies.

Fraser's views clashed considerably with those of Harry Holland, still serving as leader, but the party gradually shifted its policies away from the more extreme left of the spectrum. Fraser soon became convinced that political action via parliamentary process was the only realistic course of action to achieve Labour movement ambitions. As a result, he accepted the inevitable compromises (which Holland did not) that the attainment of parliamentary success required.

In 1933, however, Holland died, leaving the leadership vacant. Fraser considered contesting it, but eventually endorsed Michael Joseph Savage, Holland's more moderate deputy. Fraser became the new deputy leader. While Savage represented perhaps less moderate views than Fraser, he lacked the extreme ideology of Holland. With Labour now possessing a "softer" image and the existing conservative coalition struggling with the effects of the Great Depression, Savage's party succeeded in winning the 1935 election and forming a government.

Fraser served as vice-president of the Labour Party in 1919–1920, and as party president in 1920–1921.

== Cabinet minister ==
In the new administration, Fraser became the Minister of External Affairs, the Minister of Island Territories, Minister of Health, Minister of Education and Minister of Marine. He showed himself extremely active as a minister, often working seventeen hours a day, seven days a week. During his first years in cabinet, his wife, Janet, had an office next to his and worked as his research assistant and adviser in order that she could spend time with him. She would also prepare meals for him during his long days at parliament.

He had a particular interest in education, which he considered vital for social reform. His appointment of C.E. Beeby to the Education Department provided him with a valuable ally for these reforms. Fraser held a passionate belief that education had a huge part to play in the social reform he desired.

Fraser's narrowly elitist and Anglophile cultural perspectives are illustrated by his crucial role in planning New Zealand's 1940 Centennial celebrations. He used his cultural protege James Shelly, an Englishman who insisted that England was to be the source of New Zealand's cultural life – and by 'cultural' Shelley and Fraser meant so-called high culture sourced from England. As head of the 1940 Centennial Musical Celebrations Shelley followed Fraser in insisting the music would be 'high' culture only. He reassured Fraser that "established Musical Societies, who, throughout New Zealand’s history, have done such magnificent and effective work in developing and keeping alive that appreciation of good music which is so essential to the cultural development of the people of any country." To implement this the Government would import from England "a Musical Adviser and a sufficient number of outstanding Soloists." The result:"a sumtuous feast of good music." Neither Fraser nor Shelley contemplated involving New Zealand born performers and artists.

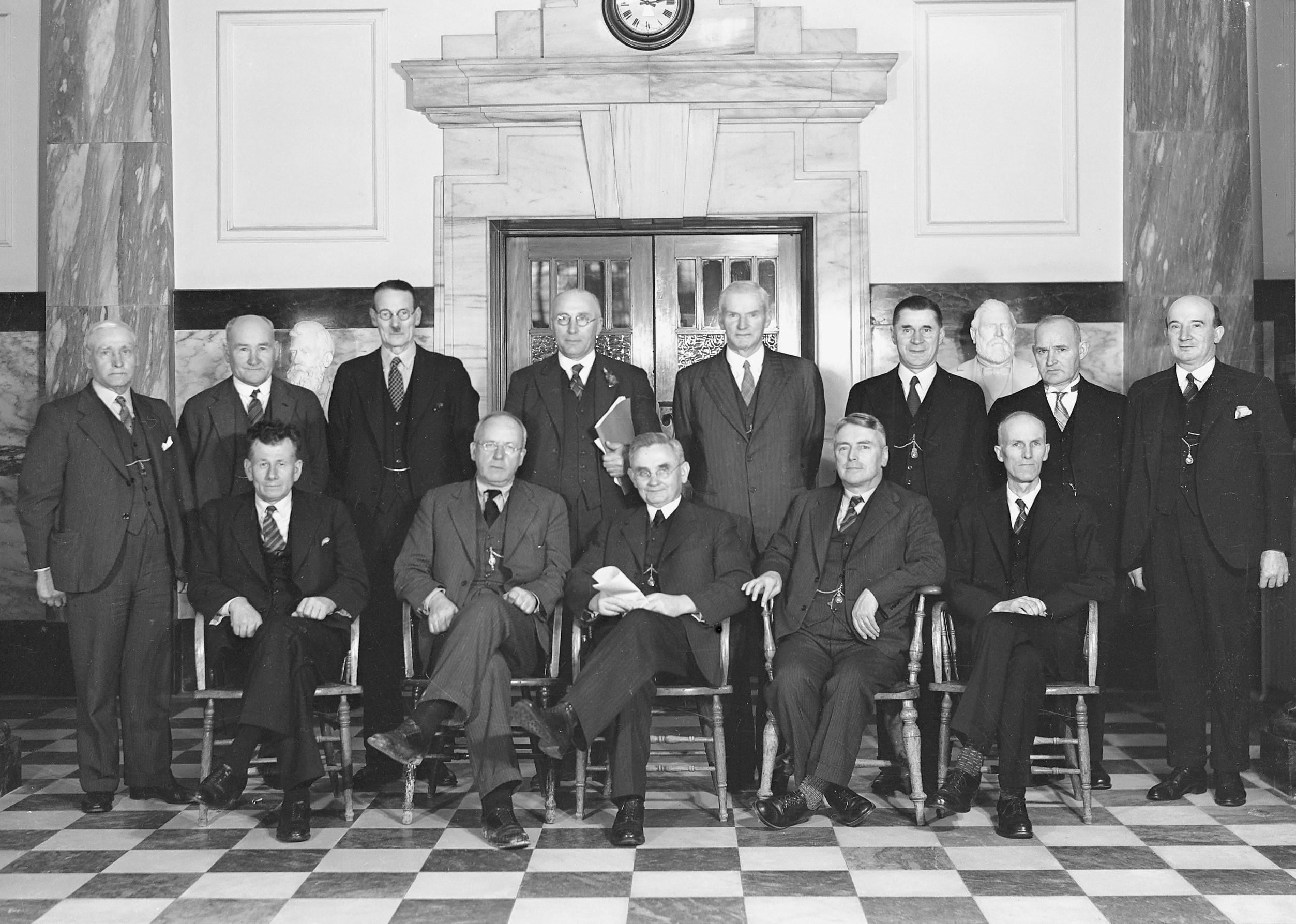
Labour Cabinet, 1935. Fraser is seated on the front row, second left, next to Savage

As Minister of Health, Fraser also became the driving force behind the 1938 Social Security Act. The Act proposed a comprehensive health care system, free at the point of use; it faced strong opposition, particularly from the New Zealand branch of the British Medical Association. Eventually, Fraser negotiated effectively enough to force the Association to yield. Fortunately for him, Janet Fraser had long volunteered in the health and welfare fields and was an invaluable adviser and collaborator.

When the Second World War broke out in 1939, Fraser had already taken over most of the functions of national leadership. Michael Joseph Savage had been ill for some time and was near death, although the authorities concealed this from the public. Fraser had to assume most of the Prime Minister's duties in addition to his own ministerial ones. Internal disputes within the Labour Party made Fraser's position more difficult. John A. Lee, a notable socialist within the Party, vehemently disapproved of the party's perceived drift towards the political centre, and strongly criticised Savage and Fraser. Lee's attacks, however, became strong enough that even many of his supporters denounced them. Fraser and his allies successfully moved to expel Lee from the Party on 25 March 1940.

== Prime minister ==
When Savage died on 27 March, Fraser successfully contested the leadership against Gervan McMillan and Clyde Carr. He had, however, to give the party's caucus the right to elect people to Cabinet without the Prime Minister's approval – a practice which has continued as a feature of the Labour Party today.

Despite the concession, Fraser remained in command, occasionally alienating colleagues due to a governing style described by some as "authoritarian". Some of his determination to exercise control may have come about due to the war, on which Fraser focused almost exclusively. Nevertheless, certain measures he implemented, such as censorship, wage controls, and conscription, proved unpopular with the party. In particular, conscription provoked strong opposition, especially since Fraser himself had opposed it during the First World War. Fraser replied that fighting in the Second World War, unlike in the First World War, had indeed a worthy cause, making conscription a necessary evil. Despite opposition from within the Labour Party, enough of the general public supported conscription to allow its acceptance.

=== Second World War ===
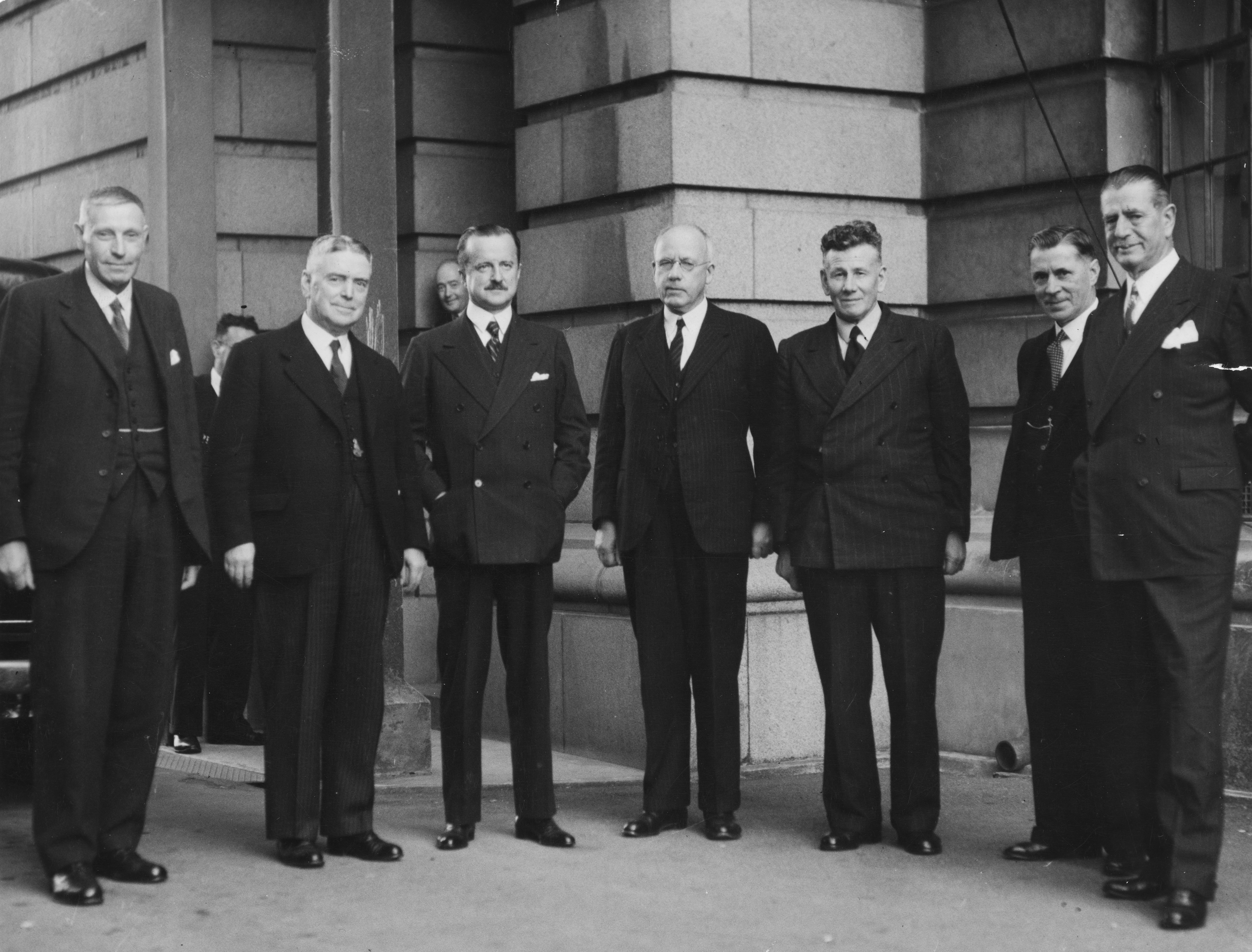
Group portrait photograph taken at a gathering of Cabinet ministers in 1941. Fraser is standing in the centre. Former prime minister and dissident National MP Gordon Coates stands furthest right.

Fraser was one of the immediate few in New Zealand who instantly grasped that war meant not merely the involvement of the military, but that of the whole country. These implications were not always recognised either by his own party or by the opposition. Fraser further developed somewhat of an authoritarian streak as a result; this reflected his insistence on the overwhelming importance of the war effort above all else.

During the war, Fraser attempted to build support for an understanding between Labour and its main rival, the National Party. However, opposition within both parties prevented reaching an agreement, and Labour continued to govern alone. Fraser did, however, work closely with Gordon Coates, a former prime minister and now a National-Party rebel – Fraser praised Coates for his willingness to set aside his party loyalty, and appears to have believed that National leader Sidney Holland placed the interests of his party before national unity.

In terms of the war effort itself, Fraser had a particular concern with ensuring that New Zealand retained control over its own forces. He believed that the more populous countries, particularly Britain, viewed New Zealand's military as a mere extension of their own, rather than as the armed forces of a sovereign nation. After particularly serious New Zealand losses in the Greek campaign in 1941, Fraser determined to retain a say as to where to deploy New Zealand troops. Fraser insisted to British leaders that Bernard Freyberg, commander of the 2nd New Zealand Expeditionary Force, should report to the New Zealand government just as extensively as to the British authorities.

When Japan entered the war in December 1941, Fraser had to choose between recalling New Zealand's forces to the Pacific (as Australia had done) or keeping them in the Middle East (as British prime minister Winston Churchill requested). Opinion was divided on the question and New Zealand's manpower resources were already stretched to capacity. Fraser received assurances from U.S. President Franklin D. Roosevelt that American forces would be made available for New Zealand's defence. The local populace possessed an understandable view that the division's proper place was defending their homes. Fraser weighed up public opinions against the strategic arguments involved and eventually opted to leave New Zealand's Expeditionary Force where it was.

In a remarkable display of political acumen and skill, he then persuaded a divided government and Parliament to give their full support [to leave the army in Africa]. It was leadership of the highest order.

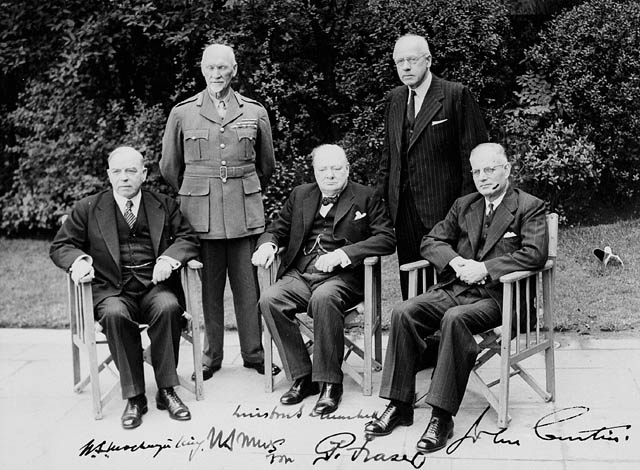
Fraser (standing, right) at the 1944 Commonwealth Prime Ministers' Conference in London

Fraser had a very rocky relationship with U.S. Secretary of State Cordell Hull, particularly over the Canberra Pact in January 1944. Hull gave Fraser a sharp and rather demeaning dressing-down when Fraser visited Washington D.C. in mid-1944, which resulted in New Zealand's military becoming sidelined to some extent in the conduct of the Pacific War.

=== Furlough Mutiny ===
By early 1943 Fraser faced a major military and strategic problem that also had significant political implications in this New Zealand election year. The New Zealand Division, part of the Eighth Army in North Africa, were now battle-weary. The bulk of the Division had been overseas for almost three years. Nearly 43% of the troops had suffered casualties. "The men were homesick, exhausted and war-weary."

In 1943 Fraser arranged for 6,000 men to return home from the Mediterranean theatre for a three-month furlough (period of military leave), anticipating that the grateful men and their families would be more disposed to vote Labour in the general election. Upon arrival, however, many of the veterans were furious at the numbers in reserved occupations, some of whom were making menial goods of no use to the war effort. Moreover, unions had ensured that bonuses and high pay were awarded to munitions workers, far in excess of the money paid to the men in combat. "No man twice before every man first" became one of the returning soldiers' mantras, and several thousand of them secured an exemption from further service due to age or being married.

A number of the remainder were court-martialed, sentenced to 90 days' imprisonment and forced to return, though some had deserted and were not able to be found. Further, they were denied a military pension and refused government jobs. Due to censorship, the public heard little of the protests and the affair, known as the "Furlough Mutiny", was omitted from post-war history books for many years.

=== Trans-Tasman relationship ===
Fraser's government also established a far closer working understanding with the Labor government in Australia. He signed the Australian-New Zealand Agreement of 1944, in which Fraser, under pressure by Australia's foreign minister, H. V. Evatt, overplayed his hand seeking to ensure that both Australian and New Zealand interests in the Pacific would not be overlooked in the war or its aftermath. New Zealand and Australia were both anxious to have their input in the planning of the Pacific War, and later in the decisions of the "Great Powers" in the shaping of the post-war world.

=== Social reforms ===
In spite of the war, a wide range of progressive reforms were carried out during the course of Fraser's wartime premiership; with further reforms realised following the end of the war. Family allowances were extended to more people, and in 1941 a range of new health benefits was introduced, together with a Needy Families Scheme for families being rehoused. The Crimes Amendment Act of 1941 brought flogging to an end, and the Medical Advertisements Act of 1942 sought to ensure (as noted by one study) “that all medical advertisements were defensible, ie that all claims made to the public could be proven.” In 1943, compassionate grants were introduced for the widows of those government officers who had died before retirement, while the criteria for entitlement to Widows Benefit were liberalised. The Social Security (Domestic Assistance) Regulations of 1944 provided for domestic assistance in hardship cases or when a mother is incapacitated. The Quarries Act 1944 provided for safety in quarries while the Waikato-Maniapoto Maori Claims Settlement Act of 1944 provided compensation for land confiscations. Also in 1944, two weeks of annual leave for all workers was introduced by law. That same year, the school leaving age was increased from 14 to 15. The Bush Workers Act of 1945 sought to improve safety for bush workers and a Minimum Wage Act introduced that same year provided for a minimum wage for every worker aged 21 and above. Also in 1945, an Act was introduced that sought to improve housing conditions.

In 1946, a means test for family benefits and grants to mothers was lifted. Also in 1946, a Factories Act was introduced that included various provisions aimed at ensuring good working conditions, such as prohibiting overtime employment for those under the age of 16, increasing the air space available to each person, and tackling sweating. The Act also included provisions concerning means of access and safety of places of employment, dangerous liquids, machinery, and means of escape when there is a fire to ensure workplace safety. In addition, it empowered the Factory Inspector to require (as noted by one study) “the provision of a canteen where the number of persons employed in a factory and requiring their meals at the factory exceeds 100.” That same year, a mothers allowance was introduced for widows with dependent children. In 1947, an Adult Education Act was introduced that established a National Council of Adult Education (as noted by one study) “to promote and to administer work in the adult education field, as well as to foster cultivation of the arts.” The following year, a Tuberculosis Act was introduced that included various provisions aimed at combating the disease. A number of state-funded cultural institutions were also set up, including a Literary Fund aimed at helping writers struggling.

=== Post-war ===
After the war ended, Fraser devoted much attention to the formation of the United Nations at the San Francisco conference (UNCIO) in 1945; this "was the apogee of Fraser's career". Noteworthy for his strong opposition to vesting powers of veto in permanent members of the United Nations Security Council, he often spoke unofficially for smaller states. He was elected chairman of one of the main committees which was considering dependent territories, and next year in London was chairman of one of the social-economic committees at the first assembly in London. He earned the respect of many world statesmen through his commitment to principle, his energy, and most of all his skill as a chairman. It was to Fraser's stature that New Zealand would later owe much of its favourable international reputation.

Fraser had a particularly close working relationship with Alister McIntosh, the head of the Prime Minister's department during most of Fraser's premiership and then of the Department of External Affairs, created in 1946. McIntosh privately described his frustration with Fraser's workaholism, and with Fraser's insensitivity towards officials' needs for private lives; but the two men had a genuinely affectionate relationship.

Fraser also took up the role of Minister of Native Affairs (which he renamed Māori Affairs) in 1947. Fraser had had an interest in Māori concerns for some time, and he implemented a number of measures designed to reduce inequality. The Maori Social and Economic Advancement Act, which he introduced in 1945, allowed Māori involvement and control over welfare programmes and other assistance.

=== New Commonwealth ===
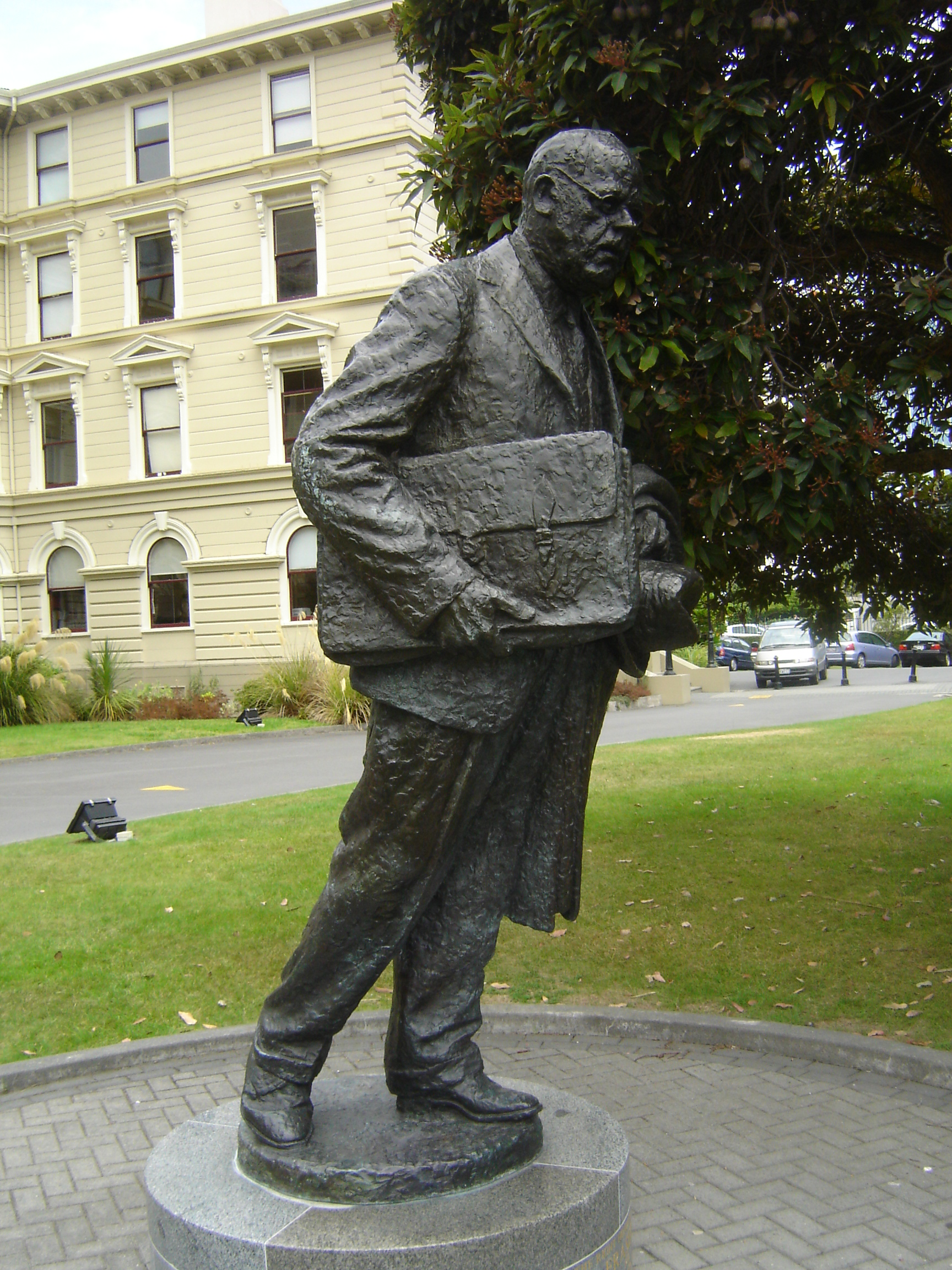
A statue of Fraser in the Government Buildings Historic Reserve in Wellington.

Fraser's Government had proposed to adopt the Statute of Westminster 1931 in its Speech from the Throne in 1944 (two years after Australia adopted the Act), in order to gain greater constitutional independence. During the Address-In-Reply debate, the opposition passionately opposed the proposed adoption, claiming the Government was being disloyal to the United Kingdom. National MP for Tauranga, Frederick Doidge, argued "With us, loyalty is an instinct as deep as religion".

The proposal was buried. Ironically, the National opposition prompted the adoption of the Statute in 1947 when its leader and future prime minister Sidney Holland introduced a private members' bill to abolish the Legislative Council, the country's upper house of parliament. Because New Zealand required the consent of the Parliament of the United Kingdom to amend the New Zealand Constitution Act 1852, Fraser decided to adopt the Statute with the Statute of Westminster Adoption Act 1947.

The adoption of the Statute of Westminster was soon followed by the debate on the future of the British Commonwealth in its transformation into the Commonwealth of Nations. In April 1949 Ireland, formerly the Irish Free State, declared itself a republic and ceased to be a member of the Commonwealth. In response to this, the New Zealand Parliament passing the Republic of Ireland Act the following year, which treated Ireland as if it were still a member of the Commonwealth. Meanwhile, newly independent India would have to leave the Commonwealth on becoming a republic also, although it was the Indian prime minister's view that India should remain a member of the Commonwealth as a republic. Fraser believed that the Commonwealth could as a group address the evils of colonialism and maintain the solidarity of common defence.

To Fraser, the acceptance of India as a republican member would threaten the political unity of the Commonwealth. Fraser knew his domestic audience and was tough on republicanism or defence weakness to deflect criticism from the loyalist and imperialist-minded opposition National Party. Labour had been in office for fourteen years and faced an uphill battle to retain power against National at the general election, which would come just months after the high-profile April 1949 Commonwealth Prime Ministers' Conference. In March 1949 Fraser wrote to the Canadian prime minister, Louis St Laurent, stating his frustration and unease over India's position. Saint Laurent had indicated that he would not be able to attend the meeting where the issue of India's republican status would dominate. Fraser argued:

I have the greatest desire to see India retained in the Commonwealth, but for the moment, I see no satisfactory means of bringing this about. Are the members of the Commonwealth who do wish to retain the Crown to end up with a form of words covering an arrangement which is entirely nebulous? Are we justified in releasing India from the obligations which the rest of us willingly assume without any reasonable accommodation on the part of India in return?

Fraser left little doubt New Zealand was opposed to India's membership as a republic when he stated to his colleagues at Downing Street:

New Zealand had been colonized by people of British stock, who had built their new country as an extension of the homeland; and their sentiments of loyalty and affection towards the Royal Family had intensified with the passage of time. Throughout the successive stages by which they had attained full national independence, their loyalty and allegiance had grown progressively stronger. New Zealand would not tolerate any dilution of those loyalties.

The conference quashed a proposal of a two-tier structure that would have had the traditional Commonwealth realms, perhaps with defence pacts, on one tier, and the new members which opted for a republic, on the second tier. The final compromise is perhaps best seen from the title finally accepted for the King, as Head of the Commonwealth.

Fraser argued that the compromise allowed the Commonwealth dynamism, that would in the future allow former colonies of Africa to join as republics and be stalwarts of this New Commonwealth. It also allowed New Zealand the freedom to maintain its individual status of loyalty to the Crown and to pursue collective defence. Indeed, Fraser cabled a senior minister, Walter Nash, after the decision was taken to accept India that "while the Declaration is not as I would have wished, it is on the whole acceptable and maximum possible, and does not at any rate leave our position unimpaired".

=== Decline and defeat ===
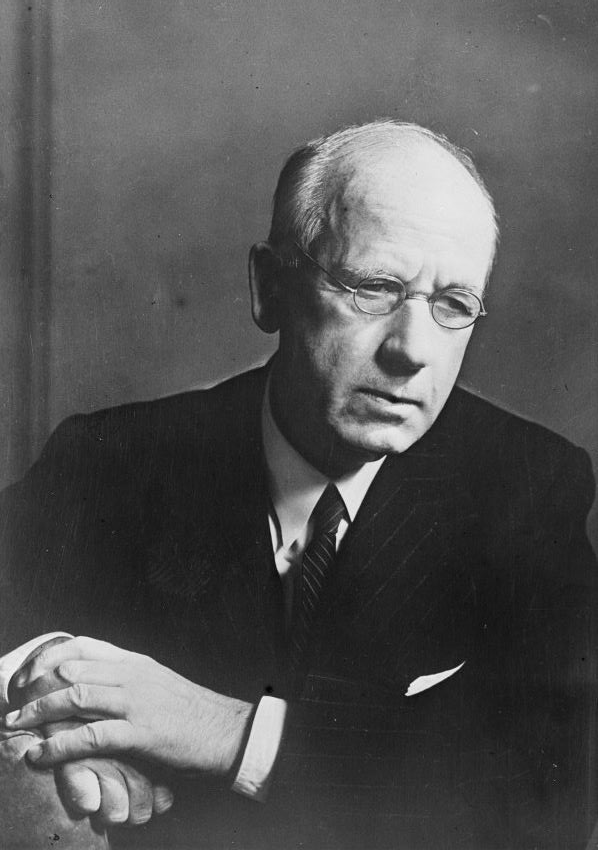
Fraser, c. 1946

Although he relinquished the role of Minister of Education early in his term as prime minister, he and Walter Nash continued to have an active role in developing educational policy with C. E. Beeby.

Labour's majority at the 1946 election was reduced to one seat. The after-effects of the war were affecting his government's popularity. Fraser moved to the Wellington seat of Brooklyn, which he held until his death. From 1940 to 1949 Fraser lived in a house "Hill Haven" at 64–66 Harbour View Road, Northland, Wellington, which had been purchased for the use of the then-ill Savage in 1939.

Fraser's domestic policies came under criticism. His slow speed in removing war-time rationing and his support for compulsory military training during peacetime in the 1949 referendum particularly damaged him politically. Some thought this hypocritical compared to Fraser's earlier sentiments on the subject. Much earlier in his career, in 1927 he is noted to have said that compulsory military training was "out of date, inefficient and not worth the money spent on it".

With dwindling support from traditional Labour voters, and a population weary of war-time measures, Fraser's popularity declined. At this stage of his career, Fraser relied heavily on the party "machine". As a result, the gap between the party leadership and rank and file members widened to the point where Labour's political enthusiasm dwindled. In the 1949 election the National Party defeated his government.

== Leader of the Opposition ==
Following the election defeat, Fraser became Leader of the Opposition, but declining health prevented him from playing a significant role. He died at the age of 66, exactly one year after leaving government. His successor as leader of the Labour Party was Walter Nash. His successor in the Brooklyn electorate, elected in the 1951 Brooklyn by-election, was Arnold Nordmeyer.

== Personal life ==
On 1 November 1919, a year after his election to parliament, Fraser married Janet Kemp (née Munro), from Glasgow and also a political activist. They remained together until Janet died in 1945, five years before Fraser's own death. During Fraser's time as prime minister, Janet traveled with him and acted as a "political adviser, researcher, gatekeeper and personal support system". Her ideas influenced his political philosophy. The couple had no children, although Janet had a son from her first marriage to George Kemp.

== Death ==
Fraser died in Wellington on 12 December 1950 from a heart attack following hospitalisation with influenza. His death came the day before the first anniversary of his leaving the premiership. His body lay in state in the New Zealand Parliament Buildings for three days before a state funeral service conducted on 16 December 1950 in St John's Church, Willis Street, by the Moderator of the Presbyterian Church. He is buried in Karori Cemetery, Wellington.

The Peter Fraser Memorial in Karori Cemetery, Wellington

== Honours ==
In 1935, Fraser was awarded the King George V Silver Jubilee Medal, and in 1937, he was awarded the King George VI Coronation Medal. He was appointed a Privy Counsellor in 1940 and a Member of the Order of the Companions of Honour in 1946.

In 2021, Janet Fraser and Peter Fraser, in recognition of their help for the Polish children were awarded by the President of Poland with Virtus et Fraternitas Medal.

== Notes ==
Government offices
Preceded by Michael Joseph Savage	Prime Minister of New Zealand; 1940–1949	Succeeded by Sidney Holland
Political offices
Preceded by Alexander Young	Minister of Health; 1935–1940	Succeeded by Tim Armstrong
Preceded by Sydney Smith	Minister of Education; 1935–1940	Succeeded by Rex Mason
Preceded by John Cobbe	Minister of Police; 1935–1949	Succeeded by Sidney Holland
Preceded by Sidney Holland	Leader of the Opposition; 1949–1950	Succeeded by Walter Nash
Preceded by Āpirana Ngata	Father of the House; 1943–1950	Succeeded by Bill Parry
New Zealand Parliament
Preceded by Robert Fletcher	Member of Parliament for Wellington Central; 1918–1946	Succeeded by Charles Chapman
New constituency	Member of Parliament for Brooklyn; 1946–1950	Succeeded by Arnold Nordmeyer
Party political offices
Preceded by Michael Joseph Savage	Leader of the Labour Party; 1940–1950	Succeeded by Walter Nash
Preceded by Michael Joseph Savage	Deputy Leader of the Labour Party; 1933–1940	Succeeded by Walter Nash
Preceded by Tom Paul	President of the Labour Party; 1920–1921	Succeeded by Frederick Cooke
