= Heinrich Franz Vosseler =

New Zealand engineer and oil refinery owner

Heinrich Franz Vosseler (1885–1975) was a New Zealand engineer and oil refinery owner. He was born in Wellington, New Zealand in 1885.
