= Harold Jack Underwood =

Clerk, farmer, toy-maker, and manufacturer

Harold Jack Underwood (1908–1979) was a notable New Zealand clerk, farmer, toy-maker and manufacturer. He was born in Wellington, New Zealand in 1908.
