= Phillip Drew =

New Zealand croquet player

Phillip Drew (born 1986 in Wellington) is a New Zealand croquet player.

== Early life and education ==
Drew started playing croquet when introduced to the game by his parents at the age of 7. In 2008, he was studying psychology and commerce at university, having been a recipient of a New Zealand Prime Minister's Athlete Scholarship.

== Career ==
Phillip represented New Zealand in the 2006 "A" series tournament against Australia. He was a qualifier in the 2006 Golf Croquet World Championships. He was awarded a wild card for the 2008 World Golf Croquet Championships in Cape Town, South Africa.

== Achievements ==
- New Zealand ranking at 16 March 2009: 10
- World ranking at 16 March 2009: 41
- Two-time winner of the NZ Edwina Thompson Silver Tray
