= First term of the Sixth Labour Government of New Zealand =

Term from 2017 to 2020

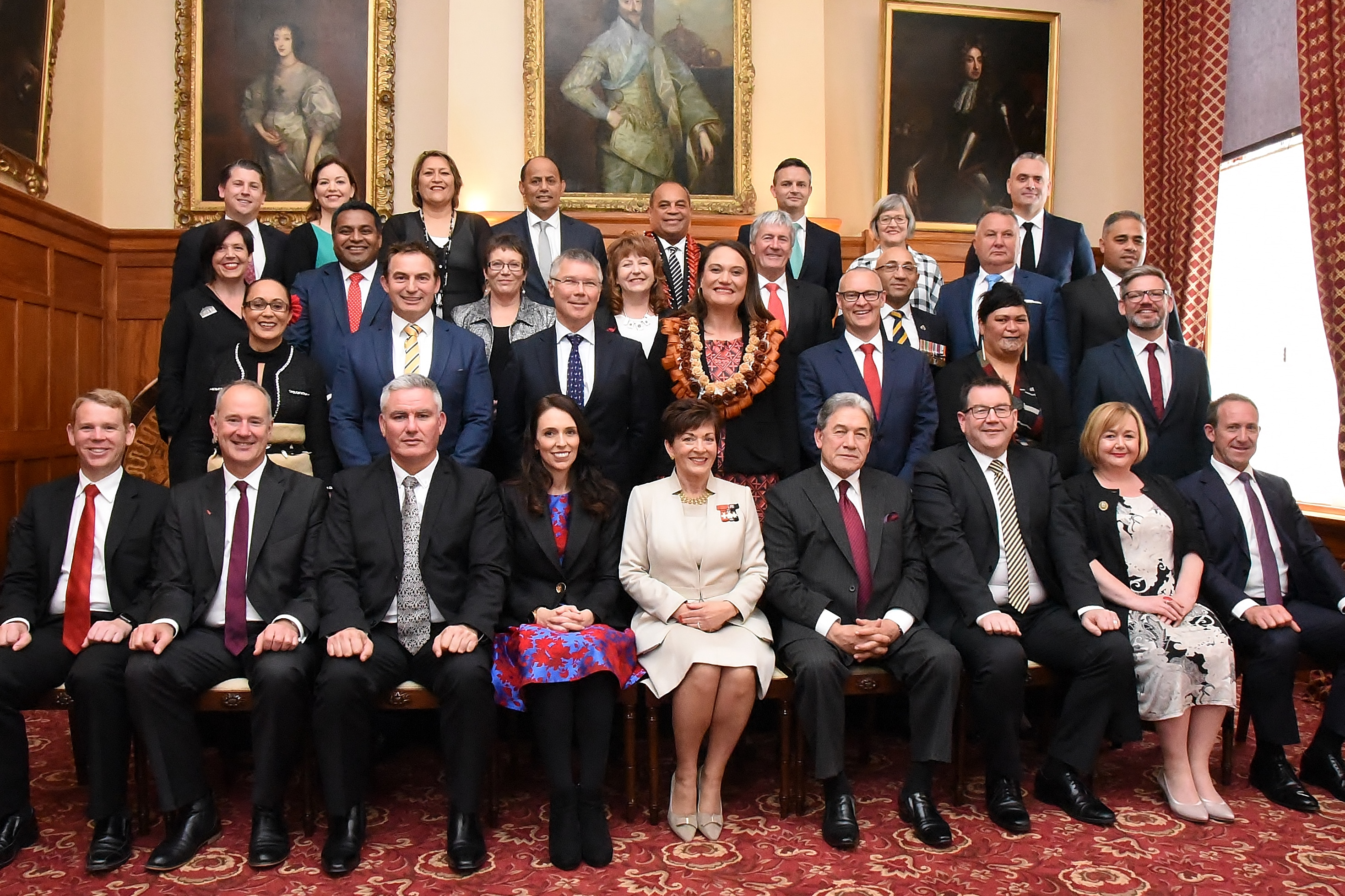
NZ First, Labour and Green ministers with the Governor-General, October 2017

The first term of the Sixth Labour Government of New Zealand lasted between 2017 and 2020. It was formed on 19 October 2017 following coalition agreements between the Labour, Green and New Zealand First parties. Three years later, Labour won a landslide victory in the 2020 general election and was returned for a second term.

== Formation ==
The general election on 23 September 2017 saw the New Zealand First party hold the balance of power between National and the centre-left bloc of Labour and the Green Party. Following several weeks of negotiations with both National and Labour, New Zealand First announced on 19 October 2017 it would seek to form a minority coalition government with Labour. Confidence-and-supply support from the Greens, negotiated separately with Labour, enables the Government to have a majority in the House of Representatives.

During the coalition-forming negotiations, Labour agreed to drop its proposed water tax on farmers as part of its agreement with New Zealand First. In return, NZ First agreed to drop their demand for referendums on overturning New Zealand's anti-smacking ban and abolishing the Māori electorates. The Greens consented to a confidence and supply agreement with Labour and New Zealand First in return for several concessions, including: a referendum on legalising cannabis, treating alcohol and drugs as a health issue, net zero emissions by 2050 and requiring a climate impact assessment analysis for all legislation

== 2017 ==
In November 2017, Prime Minister Jacinda Ardern and Trade and Export Growth Minister David Parker announced that their government would continue participating in the Trans-Pacific Partnership negotiations despite opposition from the Green Party. That same month, Ardern offered to resettle 150 of the asylum seekers from the former Manus Regional Processing Centre in New Zealand, but was rebuffed by the Turnbull Government in Australia. On 20 November, Ardern reaffirmed the Government's commitment to re-enter Pike River Mine with the goal of completing mine recovery by March 2019. Minister for Pike River Re-Entry Andrew Little also announced the creation of the Pike River Recovery Agency.

On 12 December, Education Minister Chris Hipkins announced that the Government would be ending National Standards in schools. This decision was welcomed by the teachers' and principals' unions but opposed by the opposition National and ACT parties. On 14 December, Finance Minister Grant Robertson released the 2017 mini-budget, with key 100-day plan policies such as the NZ$5.5 billion Families package being funded by cancelling the previous National Government's NZ$8 billion tax cuts. On 20 December, the Government established a Tax Working Group consisting of several academics, businesspeople, and senior civil servants under the leadership of former Finance Minister Michael Cullen with the goal of reforming the taxation system and alleviating the country's housing crisis. On 22 December, Prime Minister Ardern and Foreign Minister Winston Peters opposed US President Donald Trump's move to recognise Jerusalem as the capital of Israel at the United Nations General Assembly and reiterated New Zealand's support for the Two State Solution.

== 2018 ==
On 19 January 2018, Ardern revealed that she was expecting her first child in June, and that Deputy Prime Minister Winston Peters would serve as Acting Prime Minister while she took maternity leave for a period of six weeks. In mid-February 2018, the Government introduced legislation to stop the creation of new charter schools but to allow the 11 existing schools to continue operating while they negotiated options with the Ministry of Education; with Ardern suggesting that the existing schools could convert to "special character" schools. In early-March 2018, during a state visit to Samoa, Ardern stated that New Zealand would be seeking to shift away from a 'donor, recipient relationship' with Pacific Islands nations in favour of forming partnerships with these states and introduced a NZ$10 million aid package to Samoa with NZ$3 million going to disaster relief following Cyclone Gita and the rest being allocated to social developmental and education projects.

On 8 March 2018, Trade Minister Parker stated the government's intention of ratifying the Comprehensive and Progressive Agreement for Trans-Pacific Partnership, an amended version of the TPP, in Chile. On 3 April 2018, Ardern and Transport Minister Phil Twyford introduced the Government's ten-year draft land transport plan which included a proposed 9-12% a litre fuel tax hike, a proposed 20% fuel tax hike in Auckland, boosting public transport funding by 46%, cutting state highway funding by 11%, and allocating $4 billion over the next ten years to establish rapid transit including light rail with an initial focus on Auckland. On 11 April 2018, Attorney General David Parker announced a government inquiry into allegations that the New Zealand Special Air Service had committed war crimes against Afghan civilians during Operation Burnham while stationed in Afghanistan.

On 12 April, the government banned future offshore oil and gas exploration in New Zealand. In addition, Energy Minister Megan Woods clarified that the thirty existing exploration permits would still continue and be unaffected by the ban. New Zealand has 27 oil fields with most being located in the Taranaki Basin. The ban on future oil and gas exploration was part of a coalition agreement between the Labour and Green parties. The decision was welcomed by Greens Co-Leader James Shaw, Greenpeace and Forest & Bird but was criticised by the Mayor of New Plymouth Neil Holdom, and the opposition National and ACT parties.

On 19 April, Little entered the Pike River Mine portal with two Pike Family representatives to demonstrate that a safe re-entry was possible. He reiterated the Government's promise to re-enter the drift in order to recover evidence and the remains of the deceased miners. On 4 May, Ardern and Housing Minister Phil Twyford stated that the Government would be investing NZ$100 million into combating homelessness. This initiative included investing NZ$37 million into building 1,500 shorter term-homes and NZ$63 million into the Housing First programme; which involves finding permanent homes for vulnerable families and treating addiction and mental health issues. On 17 May, Finance Minister Grant Robertson released the 2018 New Zealand budget, allocating NZ$2.8 billion in operational funding and NZ$3.8 billion in capital funding to the 2018 New Zealand Budget.

On 11 June, the Labour-led coalition government had abandoned efforts to repeal the Sentencing and Parole Reform Act 2010 (the so-called three-strikes law) due to internal opposition from NZ First. Ardern temporarily relinquished her duties to Winston Peters, following the birth of her child, for a period of six weeks. Peters became Acting Prime Minister on 20 June 2018, when Ardern went into labour. Her six-week maternity leave concluded on 2 August 2018.

On 1 July 2018, the government announced that it would be implementing its Families Package, which had been signed into law on 15 December 2017. The Families Package would increase paid parental leave from 22 weeks to 26 weeks from July 2020; introduce a Winter Energy Payment for beneficiaries and pensioners; paying $60-a-week to low and middle-income families with babies and toddlers; reinstating the Independent Earner Tax Credit; and increasing benefit allowances for orphans, unsupported children, and foster carers. The Families Package was criticised by the opposition National finance spokesperson Amy Adams for increasing taxation. In response, Finance Minister Grant Robertson countered that the Government was investing in low and middle-income New Zealanders rather than the "top 10% of earners". Meanwhile, Child Poverty Action Group Susan St John said that "the changes were long overdue but did not go far enough".

On 14 August, the Government passed the Overseas Investment Amendment Act 2018 which bans the sale of existing homes to non-residents as a means of easing the housing shortage in New Zealand. Australians and Singaporean nationals were made exempt from this ban due to free trade rules. The Bill was supported by Labour and its coalition partners New Zealand First and the Greens but was opposed by the opposition National and ACT parties. It passed its third reading on 14 August by 63 votes to 57 votes.

On 30 August 2018, Civil Defence Minister Kris Faafoi announced that the Government was investing into supporting "rapid response teams" in emergencies following a critical Ministerial Technical Advisory Group's (TAG) review of the Government's unsatisfactory responses to the 2016 Kaikōura earthquake and the 2017 Port Hills fires.

By September 2018, all twelve existing charter schools had been successfully converted into state integrated and special character schools. In early October 2018, the Government established a new government department called the Ministry of Housing and Urban Development to manage housing and urban development issues.

In late November 2018, Ardern and Health Minister David Clark announced that the Government would reduce the costs of visits to the general practitioner as part of their Budget 2018. These policies include extending free doctors' visits to resident children under the age of thirteen and lowering Community Service Card holders' fees by $20-$30 per visit.

On 11 December 2018, the Government passed a law, amending the Misuse of Drugs Act 1975 to allow terminally ill patients to use marijuana for palliative care. The new law was supported by all coalition parties but was opposed by the opposition National Party, which argued that it would legalise recreational cannabis consumption. On 18 December, the Government announced that it would be holding a binding referendum on legalising the personal use of cannabis during the 2020 general election.

On 19 December, the Government announced that it would be voting in favour of the UN's Global Compact for Migration. Foreign Minister Peters justified the decision on the grounds the Compact was not legally binding and would not hinder New Zealand from setting its own migration policies. The Government's decision was criticised by the opposition National Party, which claimed it would violate New Zealand's sovereignty.

== 2019 ==
In mid-January 2019, Minister of Housing and Urban Development Phil Twyford admitted that the government would be unable to meet its target of building 1,000 KiwiBuild homes by 1 July, with only 33 homes being built as of 23 January. The minister estimated that the government would be able to build only 300 houses by the 1 July deadline.

On 3 February 2019, Ardern and Regional Economic Development Minister Shane Jones announced that the government had allocated NZ$100 million from its Provincial Growth Fund to supporting Māori economic development by providing access capital. It also allocated another NZ$27 million to improving transportation and the horticulture sector around Kaipara District.

In mid-February, Education Minister Chris Hipkins proposed merging the country's sixteen polytechnics into a "NZ Institute of Skills and Technology" in response to deficits and a slump in domestic enrolments. This proposed NZ Institute would also take over the enrolment and management of apprentices and industry trainees from the country's eleven industry training organisations. In addition, the government will create a new vocational funding system. The Tertiary Education Union, Employers and Manufacturers Union, and the Canterbury Employers' Chamber of Commerce have expressed tentative support for the government's proposals. However, the opposition National Party's Education spokesperson Shane Reti criticised the proposed merger, claiming that it would entail the centralisation of decision-marking in the vocational education sector. In response to the Christchurch mosque shootings on 15 March 2019, Hipkins extended the polytechnic submission timeframe to 5 April 2019.

On 5 March 2019, the New Zealand Parliament unanimously passed the Crimes Amendment Bill, which overturned a law banning "blasphemous libel" in New Zealand. The amendment received support from both government and opposition parties as well as the Ministry of Justice, the Human Rights Commission, and the New Zealand Council of Civil Liberties. The bill received the royal assent on 11 March 2019 and came into force the following day.

Following the Christchurch mosque shootings on 15 March 2019, Ardern announced that the government would be reforming New Zealand's gun laws, including a proposed ban on semi-automatic firearms. On 21 March 2019, Ardern announced that the government would ban all semi-automatic firearms and would introduce a buy-back scheme for prohibited firearms.

On 10 April, the government's Arms (Prohibited Firearms, Magazines, and Parts) Amendment Act 2019 passed its third reading, banning semi-automatic firearms, magazines, and parts. The Arms Amendment Act 2019 was supported by all parties except the opposition ACT Party's sole MP David Seymour. In addition, the government announced an amnesty and buy-back scheme for prohibited firearms and components.

On 17 April, Ardern announced that it would not be introducing a capital gains tax, citing disagreements among coalition parties over implementing such a tax. The Prime Minister pledged that under her leadership capital gains tax would not be introduced in the future. Finance Minister Robertson said that the Government would still explore options for targeting land speculation, land banking, and vacant land.

On 2 May 2019, Education Minister Hipkins announced that the Government would be investing NZ$95 million to train 2,400 new teacher trainees through increased scholarships and placements, new employment-based teacher education programmes, and iwi-based scholarships over the next four years to address the teaching shortage. Post Primary Teachers' Association President Jack Boyle responded that the Government's measures were insufficient to deal with the teachers shortage, which he attributed to insufficient salaries, high workloads, and a high attrition rate among new teaching graduates. National Party Education spokesperson Nikki Kaye claimed that the Government's spending would not address the teaching shortage while ACT MP David Seymour opined that the money would be better spent on increasing teaching salaries.

On 8 May 2019, the Government introduced the Climate Change Response (Zero Carbon) Amendment Bill to Parliament. The Government's Zero Carbon Bill passed its first reading on 22 May 2019. The opposition National Party supported the bill despite its concerns about the bill's methane targets.

On 21 May 2019, mine re-entry efforts into the Pike River Mine began.

On 30 May 2019, the Government released the 2019 New Zealand budget (Wellbeing Budget). Key provisions included creating a new frontline mental health service, investing $40 million in suicide prevention services, stationing nurses at secondary schools, building 1,044 new homes, investing $320 million into specialist services to address family and sexual violence, investing $200 million into apprenticeships and vocational training programs, investing $1 billion into KiwiRail, and investing $1.7 billion and $1.2 billion into repairing hospitals and schools respectively. The release of the Wellbeing Budget was complicated by the accidental publication two days earlier of high-level documents on a test website that was not supposed to be publicly available. Opposition Leader Bridges also criticised the Government's handling of the data leak and called for the resignations of Finance Minister Grant Robertson and Treasury Secretary Gabriel Makhlouf.

On 10 June 2019, Ardern, Foreign Minister Peters, and Defence Minister Ron Mark announced that the New Zealand Government would be withdrawing New Zealand military forces from Iraq in June 2020. The New Zealand Defence Force had dispatched a non-combat Building Partner Capacity (BPC) training mission to help Australian forces train Iraqi Security Forces at the Taji Military Complex in Iraq in support of the US-led coalition efforts to combat Islamic State forces in Iraq. The number of NZ military personnel would be reduced from 95 to 75 by July 2019, and 45 from January 2020. However, NZDF personnel would remain in Afghanistan for at least another 18 months. Ardern also announced that the number of NZDF personnel in Afghanistan would be reduced from 13 to 11 by March 2020. While National has cautiously supported the Government's policy, the party's defence spokesperson Mark Mitchell has voiced concerns that the Iraqi withdrawal was too soon.

On 11 June 2019, Defence Minister Mark released the Government's $20 billion Defence Capability Plan 2019, which will cover the NZ Defence Force's budget for the next eleven years. Key items include investing NZ$3.5 billion for new and replacement naval vessels and maritime helicopters, NZ$2.5 billion worth of upgrades for the Royal New Zealand Air Force, bolstering New Zealand Army troop numbers from 4,700 to 6,000 by 2035, and launching satellite-based surveillance systems. National's defence spokesperson Mitchell has supported the Government's Defence Capability Plan but disagreed with the Government's decision to bypass the tender process for new Lockheed C-130 Hercules aircraft.

On 20 June, Finance Minister Robertson and Police Minister Nash launched the Government's six-month firearms buy-back amnesty, which would run until 20 December. The Government allocated NZ$200 million to the firearms buy-back scheme. Licensed firearms owners will be eligible for the scheme. There are four collection options for the government's buy-back scheme: large-scale events at centralised community locations; handing over items at approved gun dealers; bulk pick-ups by Police; and at Police stations.

On 26 June 2019, the primary teachers' union, the New Zealand Educational Institute, voted to accept the Government's NZ$1.5 billion collective agreement. This collective agreement contains a new, unified pay scale that will restore parity across the state schooling sector. Key provisions include raising all teachers' base salaries by 18.5% by July 2021 and making Q3+, Q4, and Q5 teachers eligible for a new top salary of NZ$90,000. While primary teachers voted to accept the Government's offer, primary principals have rejected the offer, demanding better pay and working conditions. On 28 June 2019, the secondary teachers' union, the Post Primary Teachers' Association, voted by a majority of 65% to accept the Government's pay offer, which included a lump sum of NZ$1,500 and a 3% pay rise in July and over the next three years.

On 27 June 2019, Ardern announced a cabinet reshuffle. She split the housing portfolio into three positions; appointing Megan Woods as Minister of Housing, Kris Faafoi as Associate Minister of Housing, and Phil Twyford as Minister of Urban Development. In addition, Grant Robertson was appointed as Minister Responsible for the Earthquake Commission; Jenny Salesa as Minister of Customs; and Peeni Henare became Minister of Civil Defence. In addition, several Labour Members of Parliament were appointed to various parliamentary positions including assistant speaker, senior government whip, and parliamentary private secretaries.

On 17 July, the Government released its plan on integrating drones into the country's transportation system, entitled Taking Flight: an aviation system for the automated age. Transportation Minister Phil Twyford said that drones "could deliver economic benefits by doing tasks that are time intensive, expensive, and risky – such as monitoring crops, inspecting power lines and helping with emergency operations". As of 2019, there are 77,000 drones in New Zealand with many being used in the forestry, agriculture, and conservation sectors.

On 22 July, Ardern announced a second series of gun reforms which including creating a national firearms register, tighter restrictions on who can obtain a firearms licence, and a ban on overseas visitors buying guns in New Zealand but still allowing them to bring personal firearms into the country. Police Minister Stuart Nash announced that the Government would be drafting a new bill the following month to codify these proposed reforms into law. The New Zealand Police's union, the Police Association, has advocated the establishment of a national gun register and welcomed the government's proposed raft of gun reforms.

On 26 July, the New Zealand Educational Institute's kindergarten teacher members voted to accept a pay parity agreement with the Ministry of Education. Early childhood education teachers will receive a pay rise of at least 18.5% by July 2020, NZEI members will receive a lump sum of NZ$1,500, and there will be an increase in the head and senior teachers' allowances.

On 1 August, the Education Minister Chris Hipkins announced that the Government would merge all 16 institutes of technology and polytechnics (ITPs) into a single entity in April 2020. In addition, Hipkins announced that the Government would replace all 11 industrial training organisations (ITOs) with between four and seven workforce development councils that would be set up by 2022 to influence vocational education and training. While polytechnics have been cautiously optimistic about the changes despite concerns about losing their autonomy to a national organisation, ITOs have opposed these changes, arguing that they would wreak an already working system. National's tertiary education spokesperson Shane Reti criticised the proposed changes as a "step backward" that would lead to job losses.

On 4 August, Ardern announced that the Government would be investing NZ$25 million in purchasing 12 new radiation machines over the next three years. Funding for this will come from the $1.7 billion the Government invested in hospital and health facilities as part of its Wellbeing Budget.

On 5 August, Justice Minister Andrew Little announced a new abortion reform law that would remove abortion from the Crimes Act 1961 and allow women unrestricted access to abortion within the 20 week gestation period. Other changes include allowing women to self-refer to an abortion service, ensuring that health practitioners advise women about counselling services, establishing safe areas around abortion facilities, and requiring conscientious objecting doctors to inform women about their stance and alternative services. Despite initially ruling out a referendum, Labour's coalition partner New Zealand First has since supported calls for a referendum on abortion reform. National Party leader Simon Bridges has indicated that he would support a Select Committee considering the bill. On 8 August, the Government's abortion reform bill passed its first reading by 94 to 23 votes. Politicians followed a conscience vote instead of voting according to party lines.

In mid August 2019, the Associate Housing Minister Kris Faafoi and Social Development Minister Carmel Sepuloni announced that the Government would be launching a NZ$54 million program to tackle homelessness in New Zealand. This includes investing $31 million in recruiting 67 intensive case managers and navigators to work with homeless people and a further $16 million in the Sustaining Tenancies Programme. This funding complements the Government's Housing First programme. On 29 August, Ardern and Children's Minister Martin announced that the Government will be launching a free lunch program. The trial program was to begin with 5,000 primary and intermediate-aged school pupils at 30 schools in Rotorua and Hawke's Bay with plans to extend it to 21,000 pupils in 120 schools by early 2021.

On 30 August, the Minister for Women Julie Anne Genter announced the establishment of a National Health Coordination Centre in Auckland in response to a measles outbreak. As of 30 August, there were 759 reported cases of measles in Auckland, 41 in the Canterbury Region, and four in the Otago and Southland regions. On 1 September, Ardern and Health Minister Clark announced that it would create a national Cancer Control Agency by December 2019 and would also invest NZ$60 million into the national drug purchasing company Pharmac as part of a ten-year cancer action plan.

On 4 September, Housing Minister Megan Woods announced that the Government was revising its KiwiBuild programme, admitting that the initial goal had been "overly ambitious" and that houses had been built in places with little demand. Changes have included scrapping its target to build 100,000 houses over the next ten years, reducing government-back deposits for housing loans from 10% to 5%, and introducing progressive home ownership schemes including shared ownership and rent to buy initiatives.

On 10 September, Ardern and Health Minister Clark announced the establishment of a Suicide Prevention Office to address the country's suicide rate. Key changes include shifting from a mental health service model to a community-based one and supporting people bereaved by suicide. The Suicide Prevention Office will initially be under the oversight of the Ministry of Health but there are plans to make it a standalone government service.

On 12 September, Ardern announced that the teaching of New Zealand history will be made compulsory in all New Zealand primary and secondary schools by 2022. Key topics include the arrival of Māori people, European colonisation, the Treaty of Waitangi, immigration to New Zealand, the country's evolving national identity during the 19th and 20th centuries, and New Zealand's involvement in the Pacific. Education Minister Hipkins also confirmed that the Education Ministry would work with historical and curriculum experts, the Māori and Pacific communities, students, parents, and other interested parties. Historically, the teaching of New Zealand history has been neglected in schools in favor of European history. Hokotehi Moriori Trust chair Maui Solomon welcomed the Government's announcement, saying that it would help dispel myths about the Moriori being a separate Melanesian people who were displaced by the Māori.

On 13 September 2019, Ardern and Police Minister Nash announced that the Government would be introducing an Arms Legislation Bill in late September. The new bill would introduce an online firearms register to stop the flow of guns into the criminal underworld. The opposition National Party, which had seen a leaked draft of the bill the previous month, and gun lobby groups claimed that the bill would hurt firearm owners and gun clubs. The Government's Arms Legislation Bill passed its first reading. Labour, the Greens, and NZ First supported the bill but it was opposed by the National and ACT parties.

In early October 2019, Immigration Minister Iain Lees-Galloway announced that the Government would be scrapping a requirement for African and Middle Eastern refugee applicants to have relatives who were residing in New Zealand. Despite increasing the African and Middle Eastern refugee quotas from 14% to 15%, New Zealand's refugee resettlement program would still focus on resettling refugees from the Asia-Pacific region, which is allocated 50% on the annual refugee quota. Refugee advocate Murdoch Stephens, World Vision, and Manawatū Refugee Voice president Tammam Tamim had previously criticized the previous policy as discriminatory.

On 8 October 2019, the New Zealand Treasury and Finance Minister Robertson released a report stating that the Government's surplus had increased from NZ$2 billion to NZ$7.5 billion. The net Government debt had also fallen to 19.2% of Gross Domestic Product (GDP), which is still short of its self-imposed Budget Responsibility Rules to keep debt at less than 20% of GDP. The total government revenue also increased from NZ$6.2 billion to NZ$86.5 billion as a result of taxation. However, the total district health board deficit rose to NZ$1 billion. The net Crown debt rose by 0.2% from NZ$57.5 billion in the 2017-2018 financial year to NZ$57.7 billion in 2019. In response, National's Economic development spokesman Todd McClay claimed that the Government was not investing enough money in taxpayers and highlighted declining business confidence.

On 23 October 2019, parliament, which had debated the End of Life Choice Bill, voted 63 votes to 57 to have the issue of euthanasia decided by a referendum at the next election. New Zealand First's members had stated that they would vote against the legislation as a block if the proposal to hold a referendum was rejected. On 13 November, the End of Life Choice Bill passed its third and final reading.

In later October 2019, the Regional Development Minister Shane Jones announced that the Government would be investing NZ$20 million into re-establishing Hillside Engineering in South Dunedin as a major heavy engineering and KiwiRail servicing hub. Hillside Engineering's operations had been wound down in 2012 due to the previous National Government's decision to buy train components from China.

In early November 2019, New Zealand and China agreed to upgrade their free trade agreement. China has agreed to ease restrictions on New Zealand imports, commit to environmental standards and give NZ preferential access to its wood and paper trade. In return, New Zealand has agreed to ease visa restrictions for Chinese tour guides and Chinese language teachers.

On 6 November 2019, the Government reversed a controversial decision by Immigration New Zealand to exclude non-resident Indian arranged marriages from the partnership visa program. Immigration NZ's earlier decision to tighten their partnership visa rules had drawn allegations of racism from the New Zealand Indian community.

On 7 November 2019, the Government's Climate Change Response (Zero Carbon) Amendment Bill passed its third reading with the near-unanimous support of most parties excluding the ACT Party. The opposition National Party supported the bill's passages into law despite some disagreements with the Government.

On 18 November, Associate Housing Minister Kris Faafoi announced that the Government would be amending the Residential Tenancies Act 1986. Proposed changes have included limited rent increases to once every twelve months, banning rental bidding, ending "no cause" evictions, extending the notice period that landlords have to give tenants for selling rental property from 42 days to 63–90 days, letting tenants make minor fittings, and anonymising complaints to the tenancy tribunal. Andrew King of the NZ Property Investors Federation and National Party leader Simon Bridges claimed that these changes would make it more difficult to evict "troublesome" tenants and would do little to address the housing shortage. By contrast, the Green Party and tenancy advocacy group Renters United have welcomed these changes as a win for tenants' rights.

On 23 November 2019, the Justice Minister Andrew Little announced that the Government would be amending the Electoral Amendment Bill to allow prisoners who had been sentenced to less than three years in prison to vote in time for the 2020 New Zealand general election; reversing the Fifth National Government's decision to strip all prisoners of their voting rights in 2010. Little argued that restoring prisoners' voting rights would aid their reintegration into society. The Government's policy shift had been preceded by a successful legal challenge mounted by prisoners advocate Arthur William Taylor in 2013 and a Waitangi Tribunal report that the voting ban on prisoners disproportionately affected Māori prisoners. While Little's announcement was welcomed by Green MP Ghahraman, National Party leader Bridges accused the Government of being "soft on crime."

On 28 November 2019, Ardern marked the 40th anniversary of the Erebus air disaster by apologizing on behalf of the Government and national carrier Air New Zealand to the families of the victims.

In early December 2019, Justice Minister Little announced that the Government would be introducing legislation to ban foreign donations over the amount of NZ$50 in a move to combat foreign interference in New Zealand elections. This policy would put New Zealand in line with Australia, Canada, and the United Kingdom, which have introduced similar electoral financing legislation.

In early December, the Education Minister Chris Hipkins introduced the Education and Training Bill 2019. This omnibus bill aims to loosen restrictions on teachers using force, make religious instruction optional, and focus more on the Treaty of Waitangi. The bill passed its first reading with the support of Labour and its coalition partners NZ First and the Greens but was opposed by the National and ACT parties. In addition, Ardern announced that the Government would be investing NZ$400 million in school property upgrades, with each school being allocated between NZ$50,000 and NZ$400,000 depending on their school roll.

On 18 December, Workplace Relations and Safety Minister Iain Lees-Galloway announced that the Government would be raising the minimum wage to NZ$18.90 an hour from April 2020, a $1.20 increase from $17.70. This news was welcomed by the Council of Trade Unions and E-Tu unions but was criticised by the opposition National Party's Workplace Relations and Safety spokesperson Todd McClay, who claimed that a wage hike would cost jobs and increase costs on small businesses.

== 2020 ==
In response to the 2019–20 Australian bushfire season, the New Zealand Government dispatched 179 firefighters, medical personnel, and elements of the Royal New Zealand Air Force and New Zealand Army to assist with firefighting efforts.

On 12 January 2020, the Government announced that the Ministry of Education would be introducing climate change education into the educational curriculum for students aged between 11 and 15 years. These new resources would include lessons about climate change mitigation, activism, and combating climate skepticism. The Government's climate change teaching resource was criticized by Federated Farmers, and the opposition National and New Conservative parties. Federated Farmers also organized a petition calling on the Government to withdraw the climate change material from the Education Ministry's website. National indicated that they would withdraw the material from the education system if elected. By contrast, left-wing blogger Martyn Bradbury claimed that the climate change curriculum did not go far enough in pursuing "polluters."

On 13 January, Education Minister Hipkins also announced that parents would be required to give explicit written permission for their children to receive religious instruction in schools. While the New Zealand education system is secular, several Christian groups including the Churches Education Commission have provided Bible lessons in primary schools under a provision of the Education Act that allows state schools to hold religious education classes for up to 20 hours a year. This has been opposed by the secular advocacy group Secular Education Network.

On 28 January, Ardern announced that the 2020 New Zealand general election would be held on 19 September 2020.

In late January 2020, Broadcasting Minister Kris Faafoi announced that the Government was planning to merge TVNZ and Radio New Zealand into a new public broadcasting service. In response, the opposition National Party's Broadcasting spokesperson Melissa Lee and Opposition Leader Bridges announced that it would oppose any plans to merge Radio NZ and TVNZ.

On 29 January, the Government announced the New Zealand Upgrade Programme, a $12 billion infrastructure package focusing on highway upgrades and rail improvements with some spending on health and education.

In late January, the Government announced that they would be chartering a Boeing 777-200ER plane from the national carrier Air New Zealand to assist in the evacuations efforts of New Zealand, Australian, and Pacific Island nationals from Wuhan in response to the COVID-19 pandemic. On 2 February, the Government imposed a temporary travel ban on all foreign nationals traveling from or transiting through mainland China in response to the coronavirus outbreak, which came into effect on 2 February. New Zealand citizens and permanent residents, and their immediate family members, were allowed to enter New Zealand, but must self-isolate for 14 days.

In mid-February, the Government announced that they would be investing NZ$300 million into the Aotearoa New Zealand Homelessness Action Plan to combat homeless including creating an extra 1,000 transitional housing places and investing $70 million into homelessness prevention programmes. In late February, Ardern announced that the Government would be contributing NZ$2 million to Fiji's climate change relocation fund to help people displaced by climate change. This is part of the Government's NZ$150 million climate change aid package for the Pacific Islands.

On 28 February, the Government imposed a temporary travel ban on travelers from Iran in response to the coronavirus outbreak. While New Zealand citizens and permanent residents will be allowed to return, they must self-isolate for 14 days. In addition, Health Minister David Clark announced that no exemptions would be made for Chinese international students to re-enter the country and that there would be an increased health presence at airports. That same day, Ardern confirmed New Zealand's first case of the coronavirus outbreak, an individual who had returned from Iran earlier in the week.

On 2 March, the Government extended travel restrictions on Iran and China by seven days. In addition, travelers arriving from northern Italy and South Korea will be required to self-isolate for 14 days. On 4 March, Ardern confirmed New Zealand's second case of the coronavirus, an individual who had returned from Italy with her family.

On 6 March, Police Minister Stuart Nash announced that the Government would be investing NZ$1.9 million from the Proceeds of Crime Fund into installing hundreds of new fog cannons at dairies across New Zealand in order to combat robberies. On 9 March, Ardern appointed Andrew Coster as the new Commissioner of Police, replacing Mike Bush who will step down after two terms in April 2020.

On 14 March, Ardern announced in response to the coronavirus epidemic that the government would be requiring anyone entering New Zealand from midnight 15 March to isolate themselves for 14 days. The Government also placed a temporary entry ban on all cruise ships until 30 June 2020, which came into effect at midnight on 14 March. In addition, the government imposed restrictions on travelers heading to the Pacific Islands, excluding anyone with coronavirus symptoms from traveling there and requiring those who have been traveling overseas prior to isolate for 14 days before traveling to the Pacific. The government also canceled anniversary memorial services for the 2019 Christchurch mosque shootings due to coronavirus concerns.

On 17 March, Finance Minister Grant Robertson announced a NZ$12.1 billion business package in response to the coronavirus pandemic. This includes $8.7 billion for businesses and jobs, $2.8 billion for income support, and $500 million for health. As part of the package, the government also invested $126 million in COVID-19 leave and self-isolation support and $600 million into a support package for national carrier Air New Zealand.

On 19 March, Ardern announced that borders would be closed to all non New Zealand citizens and residents, beginning at midnight NZDT. The only categories exempted from the ban were Samoan and Tongan citizens traveling to New Zealand for essential reasons, "essential health workers", and those seeking to enter the country for humanitarian reasons.

On 21 March, Ardern introduced a COVID-19 alert level system after health authorities confirmed 13 new cases, bringing the total to 52. As a result of a level 2 ranking, people over the age of 70 or with compromised immune systems were encouraged to stay at home, and all non-essential domestic travel was curtailed.

On 22 March, Associate Health and Whānau Ora Minister Peeni Henare announced that the Government would be investing NZ$56.4 million in assistance for Māori communities and businesses affected by the coronavirus pandemic.

On 23 March, Ardern raised the COVID-19 alert level to level 3 after health authorities confirmed 36 new cases, bringing the total to 102. As a result, all mass gatherings including schools were cancelled. She also announced that the government would upgrade the national alert level to level 4 on 11:59 pm on 25 March, which would lead to a nationwide lockdown for at least four weeks. All sporting matches and events as well as non-essential services such as pools, bars, cafes, restaurants, playgrounds were closed, while essential services such as supermarkets, petrol stations, and health services remained open. The government announced a list of "essential services" that would continue to function during the four-week lockdown period which came into effect from 26 March.

On 24 March, the government announced that parliament would adjourn for five weeks beginning on 27 March. Prior to the parliament's closure, it passed three bills with cross-party support dealing with emergency spending, remitting interest on tax owed after 14 February, allowing local authorities to meet remotely, governments to take over schools, and preventing no-cause evictions and freezing rent for six months. That same day, Finance Minister Grant Robertson also announced that the government was negotiating with banks to ensure that nobody would lose their homes as a result of defaulting on mortgage payments during the pandemic.

On 25 March, it was announced that Leader of the Opposition Simon Bridges would chair a cross-party committee called the Epidemic Response Committee to scrutinise the government's response to COVID-19. Two thirds of members will be from the opposition National while the remainder will come from the Labour, New Zealand First and Green parties. Other members include New Zealand First MP Fletcher Tabuteau, Greens co-leader Marama Davidson, and ACT leader David Seymour.

On 26 March, Ardern announced that the government would provide $27 million to social service providers such as the Salvation Army and Women's Refuge to help the vulnerable cope with the lockdown. In addition, Finance Minister Grant Robertson also announced that the government had given NZ$1.5 billion to more than 240,000 workers as part of its wage subsidy scheme in response to the coronavirus pandemic.

On 8 April, Ardern and Education Minister Chris Hipkins announced that the government was investing in a NZ$87.7 million distance learning package to facilitate education during the lockdown period. This distance learning package including two education television channels (one English and the other Māori), improved Internet access and devices, online resources for parents, handheld devices, and educational material for different year levels.

On 14 April, the New Zealand Government announced a NZ$130 million support package for tertiary students including raising the amount of course related costs able to be claimed per student for the year to NZ$2,000 temporarily, continuing support payments for students unable to study online for up to eight weeks, and ensuring that students whose studies have been disrupted by the COVID-19 pandemic's eligibility for student loans and Fees Free study would not be affected.

On 15 April, Ardern announced that all government ministers and public sector chief executives would take a 20 percent pay cut in response to the coronavirus pandemic. Opposition Leader Simon Bridges has also confirmed that he will take a 20 percent pay cut.

On 20 April, Ardern extended New Zealand's Alert Level 4 by another seven days, arguing that the country needed to consolidate the gains made in containing the spread of the coronavirus. The Alert Level 4 will end at 11:59 pm on 27 April with the country entering into Alert Level 3 on 28 April. Ardern also announced that schools and early childhood centres could reopen on 29 April.

On 23 April, Broadcasting Minister Kris Faafoi announced the Government's NZ$50 million media release package which includes $20.5 million to eliminate broadcasting transmission fee for six months; $16.5 million to reduce media organisations' contribution fees to New Zealand On Air for the 2020/21 financial year; $11.1 million in specific targeted assistance to companies; $1.3 million to purchase central government news media subscriptions; and $600,000 to completely cut Radio New Zealand's AM transmission fees for six months. Faafoi also confirmed that the proposed TVNZ–Radio New Zealand merger had been suspended as a result of the economic fallout of the coronavirus pandemic.

On 1 May the Government, with the unanimous support of all parliamentary parties, passed a NZ$23 billion omnibus tax support package to support New Zealand businesses affected by the ongoing coronavirus pandemic. This bill's provisions included a NZ$3 billion tax relief package for businesses, NZ$25 million for further business support in 2021, a $NZ10 billion wage subsidy scheme, NZ$4.27 billion to support 160,000 small businesses, and NZ$1.3 billion for 8,900 medium-sized businesses.

On 5 May, Ardern attended the Australian Emergency Cabinet via video conference alongside Australian Prime Minister Scott Morrison and several Australian state and territorial leaders. The NZ and Australian Governments agreed to work together develop a trans-Tasman COVID-safe travel zone that would allow residents from both countries to travel freely without travel restrictions as part of efforts to ease coronavirus restrictions.

On 11 May Ardern announced that New Zealand would be entering alert level 2 at 11:59 pm on 13 May. While most lockdown restrictions would be lifted, there would still be restrictions on social distancing in public while private gatherings such as funerals, tangi, weddings, and religious services would be limited to ten people. Schools can reopen on Monday 18 May, while bars (defined as on-licence premises which primarily serve beverages) can reopen on 21 May. The Government will look at lifting the limit on public gatherings without physical distancing on 25 May.

On 13 May, the Government passed the COVID-19 Public Health Response Act 2020 which gave police the power to enter homes in order to enforce lockdown restrictions without a warrant. This bill was opposed by the opposition National and ACT parties, and criticised by the Human Rights Commission. In addition, Civil Defence Minister Peeni Henare lifted the national state of emergency. Health Minister David Clark also announced changes to the alert level 2 rating, allowing up to 50 people to attend funerals and tangihanga. Education Minister Chris Hipkins has also moved the National Certificate of Educational Achievement (NCEA) high school exams from 6 November to 16 November.

On 14 May, Finance Minister Grant Roberson released the 2020 budget. Its provisions include a NZ$50 billion COVID-19 Response and Recovery Fund, a NZ$3.2 billion wage subsidy scheme, business support, trades training support, a NZ$1.1 billion environmental jobs package, investing $900 million to supporting the Māori community, and extending the school lunch programme.

On 20 May, the Government released a COVID-19 contact tracing app called the NZ COVID Tracer.

On 25 May, Ardern raised the limits on social gatherings including religious services, weddings, and funerals to 100, which comes into effect at 12pm on 29 May 2020. Ardern also confirmed that Cabinet would consider a decision to move into alert level 1 on 8 June, with 22 June set as the tentative date for moving into alert level 1. That same day, Finance Minister Robertson introduced a new 12-week relief payment scheme for New Zealand citizens and residents who lost their jobs as a result of the COVID-19 pandemic, which comes into effect on 8 June. It pays NZ$490 per week for those who lost full-time work and NZ$250 for part time workers including students.

On 3 June, Ardern announced that the Government would make a decision to enter Alert Level 1 on 8 June. She clarified that Alert level 1 would involve the elimination of social distancing restrictions on shops, restaurants, public transportation and public gatherings including religious services, funerals, weddings, and community sports events. However, event organisers would have to ensure contact tracing. That same day, National alleged that a leaked cabinet paper suggested that New Zealand could move into Alert level 1 straight away. The Government contended that the paper represented "one strand" of decision making and that any move into alert level 1 was predicated upon eliminating the chains of transmissions and ensure there were no new community transmissions for at least 28 days. That same day, Ardern announced that the Government would be distributing free sanitary products in 15 Waikato high schools on a trial basis as part of a NZ$2.6 million initiative to combat "period poverty."

On 18 June 2020, the Government's Arms Legislation Bill 2019 passed into law. New Zealand First agreed to support the bill's passage in return for the establishment of an independent entity that would take over firearms licensing and administration from the police. In addition, the amended Bill also allowed members of the farming community, owners and managers of agricultural businesses to apply for endorsements to use prohibited firearms for pest control without having to establish a company to carry out the work.

On 19 June 2020, Housing Minister Megan Woods was given joint responsibility with Air Commodore Darryn Webb for supervising isolation and quarantine facilities for travellers entering New Zealand, as part of the Government's response to the COVID-19 pandemic.

On 24 June, Transport Minister Phil Twyford abandoned its flagship Auckland Light Rail project due to disagreements between Labour and its coalition partner New Zealand First. The Auckland Light Rail sought to connect the Auckland CBD with Auckland Airport in Auckland's southern Manukau suburb. Mayor of Auckland Phil Goff expressed disappointment while National's Transport spokesperson Chris Bishop listed the abandonment of Auckland Light Rail as one of the Government's failures.

On 24 June, the Government's Electoral (Registration of Sentenced Prisoners) Amendment Bill passed with the support of the Labour, New Zealand First, and Green parties. National, ACT, and Jami-Lee Ross opposed the bill. The Bill allowed prisoners serving sentences of less than three years to vote. In addition, it incorporated an amendment supported by both the Greens and National which eliminates the Electoral Commission's power to remove voters from the electoral roll. It also advises prisoners serving any sentence of their right to register to vote but that their disqualification would remain if they were serving more than three years. Justice Minister Little accused National of sabotaging the bill and announced that this change to the bill would be corrected.

On 29 June, Health Minister David Clark announced that the Government was investing NZ$150 million in personal protective equipment from their NZ$50 billion COVID-19 Response and Recovery Fund unveiled in the 2020 New Zealand budget. In addition, returnees in isolation facilities are required to wear face masks.

On 2 July, Health Minister Clark resigned from his portfolio, stating that he "had become a distraction from the Government's ongoing response to the COVID-19 pandemic and health reforms." Following Clark's resignation, Ardern appointed Chris Hipkins as interim Health Minister until the general elections in September 2020.

On 7 July, the Immigration Minister Iain Lees-Galloway extended the visas of 16,500 Essential Skills and Work to Residence workers by six months and the 12-month stand-down period for 600 migrant workers including dairy workers until February 2021.

On 21 July, Health Minister Chris Hipkins announced that the Government would be investing NZ$302 million into various health services including NZ$150 million over two years for Pharmac, NZ$30 million into the National Close Contact Service, NZ$23 million into a National Immunisation Solution, NZ$35 million for purchasing more ventilators and respiratory equipment, NZ$50 million for purchasing personal protective equipment supplies, and NZ$14.6 million for telehealth services.

On 22 July, Ardern dismissed Iain Lees-Galloway from his Immigration, Workplace Relations and Accident Compensation Corporation (ACC) ministerial portfolios after he admitted having an inappropriate relationship with a former staff member who worked at one of his agencies. Following his resignation, Kris Faafoi became Minister of Immigration while Andrew Little became Minister for Workplace Relations and Safety, and Carmel Sepuloni became Minister for ACC.

On 28 July, the Government suspended New Zealand's extradition treaty with Hong Kong in response to the Chinese Government's Hong Kong national security law introduced earlier that month. Foreign Minister Peters criticized the new law for "eroding rule-of-law principles" and undermining the "one country, two systems" policy while Ardern criticised the new law for violating the principles of freedom of association and the right to take a political view. In response, the Chinese Embassy criticised the New Zealand Government for violating international law and norms, and interfering in China's internal affairs.

On 29 July, Housing Minister Megan Woods announced that New Zealanders entering the country temporarily and most temporary visa holders with the exception of family members of citizens who were not liable, diplomats, or those here for the Christchurch mosque trial would have to pay for their 14-day stay in managed isolation. The isolation stays will cost NZ$3,100 ($2,050) for the first adult in each hotel room, $950 for each additional adult and $475 for each child sharing the room. However, New Zealanders returning home permanently will be exempt from these charges. While the Labour and Green parties supported the new ruling, New Zealand First and the opposition National party argued that the charges would apply to all travellers entering the country.

On 5 August, the Government passed the Residential Tenancies Amendment Bill which removes rental bidding, raises the period for rental increase to 12 months, eliminates "no-cause" evictions, and allows victims of domestic violence to end a tenancy within two days' notice. Landlords seeking to evict tenants will have to apply to the Tenancy Tribunal with three examples of bad behaviour over a period of three months. The opposition National Party opposed the bill with MP Alfred Ngaro criticizing the bill for disadvantaging landlords.

On 11 August, Ardern announced that lockdowns would be reintroduced over the country in response to the discovery of four community transmissions, lasting from 12 August mid-day to 14 August midnight. Auckland would be placed under a Level 3 lockdown while the rest of the country would be placed under a Level 2 lockdown. Following the discovery of more community transmissions, the Government extended the lockdowns until 11:59 pm local time on 26 August.

On 17 August 2020, Ardern delayed the 2020 New Zealand general election by four weeks until 17 October in response to the recent outbreak in COVID-19 community transmissions. In addition, the dissolution of the New Zealand Parliament was pushed back to 6 September.

On 24 August, Ardern announced that Auckland would remain under a Level 3 lockdown until 11:59 pm on 30 August, when the city and its surrounding region would move to a Level 2 lockdown. In addition, public gatherings in Auckland would be limited to ten people while a 50-person limit would be enforced for funerals and weddings. The rest of New Zealand will remain on a Level 2 lockdown until 6 September. In addition, all people using public transportation will be required to wear face masks.

On 27 August 2020, Associate Finance Minister Shaw attracted criticism from the opposition National Party's education spokesperson Nicola Willis, school principals, teachers unions' and several members of his own Green Party after he allocated NZ$11.7 million from the Government's $3 billion COVID-19 recovery fund to the private "Green School New Zealand" in Taranaki. This funding boost violated the Green Party's own policy of private schools receiving state funds. Shaw had defended the decision, claiming it would have created 200 jobs and boosted the local economy. The Education Minister Chris Hipkins stated that he would not have prioritised funding for the private school and sympathised with state schools' dissatisfaction with Shaw's decision. Following considerable criticism, Shaw apologised for approving the funding of the Green School, describing it as "an error of judgment" on 1 September. Representatives of the school have reportedly approach the Crown to convert part or all off the Government's grant into a loan. On 2 November, it was reported that Michael and Rachel Perrett, the owners of the Green School, had reached a settlement for the Government's NZ$11.7 million grant to be converted into a loan; a development that was welcomed by local principals.

On 14 September, Ardern extended the Alert Level 2.5 rating in Auckland and the Level 2 rating in the rest of the country by one week. She indicated that the Government would consider easing restrictions the following week. While the Government's decision was supported by Cabinet, New Zealand First leader and Deputy Prime Minister Winston Peters disagreed with the extension of lockdown restrictions, claiming they were unnecessary in the South Island. Similar sentiments were echoed by ACT Party leader David Seymour, who claimed they were hurting the country's businesses. In addition, the Government relaxed social distancing restrictions on public transportation including buses and planes.

On 21 September, Ardern announced that Auckland would move into Alert Level 2 on 23 September at 11:59pm while the rest of New Zealand would move into Alert Level 1 on 21 September at 11:59pm. Under Auckland's Alert Level 2 status, public gatherings of 100 people will be allowed but funerals and tangihanga will remain limited to 50 people.

On 12 October 2020, the Government signed an agreement with Pfizer and BioNTech to purchase 1.5 million COVID-19 vaccines. The COVID-19 Vaccine Strategy Task Force is also negotiating with other pharmaceutical companies to provide vaccines. In addition, the Government established a fund of $66.3 million to support a COVID-19 immunisation programme as soon as the vaccine is ready.
