= Arms Act 2026 =

New Zealand legislation

New Zealand Parliament
- Royal assent: 5 August 2026
- Commenced: 23 September 2026
- Administered by: Firearms Safety and Education New Zealand (FSE)

Legislative history
- Introduced by: Nicole McKee
- First reading: 9 December 2025
- Second reading: 21 July 2026
- Third reading: 29 July 2026

Repeals
- Arms Act 1983
- Status: Current legislation

The Arms Act 2026 is an Act of Parliament that serves as the main legislative framework for regulating the possession and use of firearms in New Zealand. The bill repeals and replaces the Arms Act 1983, focusing on public safety, simplifying regulatory requirements, and improving compliance. The bill passed its third reading on 29 July 2026, receiving royal assent on 5 August. The bill's provisions came into effect on 23 September 2026.

== Key provisions ==
The Arms Act 2026 establishes an arms regulatory regime to promote the safe possession and use of firearms in New Zealand, and impose controls to prevent the possession and use of firearms for criminal activities. The Act's arms regulatory regime is guided by the principles that firearms ownership and usage is a privilege, and that firearms users must act in the interests of personal and public safety.

The Arms Act 2026 retains many aspects of the repealed Arms Act 1983 but makes several changes including updating existing definitions. First, the Act establishes a specialist firearms regulator that operates independently of the New Zealand Police called Firearms Safety and Education New Zealand (FSE). Second, it makes several changes to the firearms licensing process including renaming dealer's licences "business licenses" and extending their duration to five years, creating a dedicated "curator licence" and a new museum worker licence.

Third, the Arms Act 2026 creates a new category of visitor licences for visitors intending to stay in New Zealand continuously for less than a year. Fourth, the Act establishes a Firearms Licensing Review Committee to review decisions related to firearms licenses. It also provides a legal framework for the Firearms Regulator, Police and other agencies to share information regarding the fitness of firearms license holders and firearms-related incidents. Fifth, the Act extends the duration of prohibited firearms endorsements for pest controllers to five years. Sixth, the Act eases licensing and registration requirement restrictions for business licence holders who repair or modify firearms for certain short-term activities. Seventh, the Act creates two new pathways to legal ownership for people who possess proscribed firearms; namely permanent deactivation or the conversion of previously lawfully prohibited firearms to standard ones.

Finally, the Arms Act 2026 increases most existing penalties in the previous Arms Act to reflect the seriousness of firearms-related offending and creates new offences to address harmful behaviours not covered in prior firearms legislation. The Act also explicitly prohibits gang members from holding a firearms license. It also introduces stricter gun licensing criteria and policies, stricter penalties for non-compliance and closes loopholes facilitating illicit transitions. The law also includes a provision to review fees for firearms licensing every five years.

The Act 2026 also retains the ban on military-style semi-automatic firearms and compulsory gun ownership registration.

== Background ==
Following the 2019 Christchurch mosque shootings, the Sixth Labour Government passed two separate laws in 2019 and 2020 banning semi-automatic firearms and creating a new arms regulatory regime including a national gun registry. On 30 November 2022, the Government also created a new firearms regulator called the Firearms Safety Authority to manage New Zealand's firearms licensing system.

On 28 February 2024, Associate Justice Minister Nicole McKee confirmed that the Sixth National Government would seek to rewrite the Arms Act 1983 as part of ACT New Zealand's coalition agreement with the National Party. McKee expressed interest in rolling back what she described as "rushed" and "knee-jerk" firearms safety legislation passed following the Christchurch mosque shootings in favour of "less onerous regulations" on firearms owners. Under the coalition agreement, the two parties also agreed to repeal and replace Part 6 of the Arms Legislation Act 2020, which gave the New Zealand Police the power to approve shooting clubs and certify shooting ranges. In late May 2024, the Government said it would consult several groups including gun club members, the police, lawyers, doctors and the Muslim community.

== Legislative history ==
=== Initial consultation ===
On 14 June 2024, McKee confirmed that the Government would introduce new legislation replacing the Arms Act 1983 as the main legislative framework for regulating firearms by 2026. In late June 2024, the New Zealand Police Association, Federation of Islamic Associations of New Zealand, Gun Control New Zealand, and the opposition Labour Party criticised the Government for the short timeframe for public submissions and giving priority to select groups. In response, McKee defended the consultation timeframe and argued that the law needed to be amended to help club ranges and owners "struggling with burdensome and confusing regulation." On 12 August, the NZ Police Association's president Chris Cahill called for McKee to be removed from the firearms reform portfolio due to the union's exclusion from the consultation process for the amendment to the Arms Legislation Act. Cahill also accused McKee of being a gun lobbyist. In response to Cahill's criticism, McKee defended the consultation process and said that Police had been consulted.

=== Introduction ===
On 11 November 2025, McKee unveiled the Government's proposed Arms Act amendment legislation. Under the proposed legislation, the Government would transfer gun licensing responsibilities from the New Zealand Police's Firearms Safety Authority to a new independent agency. However, the Government would retain its ban on semi-automatic firearms and the controversial gun registry. McKee also confirmed that the Government would create a new Firearms Licensing Review Committee and introduce eight new offenses including manufacturing firearms without a license.

=== First reading and select committee stage ===
The Arms Bill passed its first reading on 9 December 2025 with cross-party support and was referred to the justice select committee. The committee was chaired by National MP Andrew Bayly, with other members including National MPs Carl Bates, Rima Nakhle, Tom Rutherford, Labour MPs Ginny Andersen (until 25 March 2026), Camilla Belich (from 25 March), Dan Rosewarne (from 25 March), Vanushi Walters (until 25 March), Duncan Webb, Green Party MP Lawrence Xu-Nan, ACT MP Todd Stephenson, New Zealand First MP Jamie Arbuckle, and independent MP Tākuta Ferris. Green MP Scott Willis also participated in the committee's consideration of the Arms Bill.

Submissions for the Arms Bill closed on 16 February 2026; with the committee receiving submissions from 8,334 interested groups and individuals. They also heard oral evidence from 101 submitters. Notable submitters included Associate Justice Minister Nicole McKee, who made an oral submission on 19 February. In February 2026, the Royal Australasian College of Surgeons's Chairs of the Trauma Sub-committee and AoNZ National Committee issued a submission advocating reducing firearms-related trauma and highlighting the impact of gun violence on victims and society.

On 29 June 2026, the justice select committee released is report and recommended that it progress with several amendments. These amendments included a gradual commencement process between 23 September 2026 and 23 February 2028; clarifying the language around licensing, guided hunts, the role of the New Zealand Crown, gun accessories and museum worker licensing; extending visitor visas from 12 to 18 months; extending gun smiths' updating period for short-term repairs from 7 to 21 days; and giving the firearms regulator the right to appeal decisions made by the Review Committee; clarifying the powers, responsibilities and appointment of the chief executor of the Arms Regulator; and easing regulatory requirements for auction house dealers.

The Labour and Green parties also issued dissenting views regarding the Arms Bill. Labour said that transferring the Firearms Regulatory Agency from the Police would undermine the Police's intelligence and operational capabilities to combat crime. Labour also disagreed with a regulatory gap regarding push-button centrefire rifles, arguing that they met the definition of illegal semi-automatic firearms. Similarly, the Greens disagreed with the Government's decision to separate the Firearms Regulatory Agency from the Police, arguing that it would weaken police intelligence, enforcement and licensing relating to firearms issues.

=== Second and third readings ===
The Arms Bill passed its second reading on 21 July 2026 by a margin of 67 to 55 votes. While the governing National, ACT and NZ First parties supported the bill's passage, it was opposed by the Labour, Green parties, Te Pāti Māori and independent MPs Ferris and Mariameno Kapa-Kingi.

The bill passed its third reading on 29 July by a margin of 67 to 55 votes. While the governing National, ACT and NZ First parties supported the bill's passage, it was opposed by the Labour, Green parties, Te Pāti Māori and independent MPs Ferris and Kapa-Kingi. During the final debate, the bill's sponsor McKee wore a korowai gifted by the Council of Licensed Firearms Owners (COLFO). She said that opposition parties and the media had demonised gun owners and conflated them criminals. McKee said that the bill struck a balance between keeping firearms out of criminal hands while easing compliance requirements for licensed firearms owners. Labour MP Webb disputed McKee's claim that the opposition had demonised gun owners and disagreed with the Government's decision to remove the Police as the national firearms regulator.

=== Implementation ===
The Arms Act 2026 received royal assent on 5 August 2026. Most of the law's changes came into effect on 23 September 2026. Provisions relating to approved firearms dealers are expected to come into effect on 23 July 2027, while some provisions relating to multi-entry visitor visas are expected to come into effect on 23 February 2028.
