= Gun law in New Zealand =

Aspect of New Zealand laws

The gun laws of New Zealand are contained in the Arms Act 2026 statute, which replaced the Arms Act 1983. Nearly 300,000 licensed firearm owners own and use New Zealand's estimated 1.5 million firearms. Gun licences are issued at the discretion of the police provided they consider the person to be of good standing and without criminal, psychiatric or drug issues; as well as meeting other conditions such as having suitable storage facilities. Several different categories of licence are permitted, with the most common, "A Category", permitting access to sporting configuration rifles and shotguns.

Tighter regulation was imposed immediately after the Aramoana massacre in 1990, and the Scottish Dunblane and Australian Port Arthur massacres in 1996. After the Christchurch mosque shootings in 2019, legislation to restrict semi-automatic firearms and magazines with a capacity of more than 10 rounds, and provide an amnesty and buyback of such weapons, was introduced and passed by the New Zealand parliament 119 to 1.

In November 2022, a new firearms regulator called the Firearms Safety Authority was established within the New Zealand Police. In addition, the New Zealand Government established a national firearms register. In July 2026, the Government passed legislation replacing the Arms Act 1983 with the new Arms Act 2026. This legislation separated the Firearms Safety Authority from the police, eased licensing and gun dealership rules, and banned gang members from having gun licenses.

== Firearms law ==
Gun laws in New Zealand focus mainly on vetting firearm owners, rather than registering firearms or banning certain types of firearms. Firearms legislation is provided for in the New Zealand's gun laws: the Arms Act 2026, Arms Amendment Act 1992, and Arms Regulations 1992 and associated regulations. About 250,000 people hold a New Zealand firearms licence. On 10 April 2019 new bills passed placing heavier restrictions on semi automatic firearms. As part of these, a 'buy back' scheme took place which saw NZ$200 million of government funds go to prohibited firearm owners.

=== Grounds to carry or use guns ===
Under New Zealand law, some lawful, proper, and sufficient purpose is needed to use, discharge or carry any firearm, airgun, or similar weapon. The person carrying, using, or discharging the weapon is obliged to prove the purpose was lawful, proper, and sufficient. This requirement applies even if the person can legally possess the weapon. Exactly what constitutes a lawful, proper, and sufficient purpose is not defined in legislation and must be proven on a case-by-case basis. Hunting game, pest control and agricultural uses, sports, collection, and theatrics are all normally acceptable purposes.

The New Zealand firearm licence limits the grounds upon which an individual can carry a gun. The minimum legal age to own a gun is 16.

==== Personal protection of very important persons (VIPs) ====
It is established New Zealand law and public policy that allowing privately owned guns to be carried by people who provide personal protection to VIPs, whether foreign or domestic, is not appropriate. Armed protection, if necessary, should be provided by the New Zealand Police or the New Zealand Defence Forces. The New Zealand Police has a Diplomatic Protection Service (DPS) that trains and provides protection officers to protect VIPs. DPS protection officers, unlike most New Zealand police officers, are routinely armed while on duty. A temporary exception was made for the 1999 APEC Summit, hosted in Auckland. The Arms Act was specifically amended to allow authorised personal protection officers of foreign dignitaries to carry their own firearms. This exception expired on 30 September 1999.

==== Self-defence ====
In the Arms Code, a manual on firearms safety, the New Zealand Police advise "The law does not permit the possession of firearms 'in anticipation' that a firearm may need to be used in self-defence."

While the Crimes Act 1961 allows a person to use reasonable force to defend oneself or another person against assault or entry into a dwelling house, that force needs to be proportionate to any force being used to effect the assault or entry and not excessive. Preemptive action in anticipation of a threat or retribution after the threat has passed are both considered excessive force by the courts. Even police actions when confronting armed offenders that results in death or injury of anyone are thoroughly investigated by the police, the Independent Police Conduct Authority and, in cases of death, the coroner.

There have been a number of cases where a member of the public has been justified in discharging a firearm that injured or killed an assailant. In 2006 a gun shop employee shot a machete-wielding armed robber with a handgun that was hidden under the counter. The court dismissed the charges that police laid. In April 2009, a Chinese restaurant and takeaways shop owner shot a masked armed robber with the robber's own gun after wrestling it from him. Police decided against laying charges.

==== Vehicles ====
The driver of a vehicle is deemed to be the person who is in possession of any firearm in that vehicle, unless they can prove otherwise.

==== Unlawful use ====
Possessing a firearm or other weapon that could cause bodily injury or intimidate with the threat or fear of violence is an aggravating factor in criminal offending and can be a criminal offence on its own. Police responses to such behaviour can have potentially lethal consequences. The Police Armed Offenders Squad are an armed response unit are trained to resolve incidents that involve firearms using proportionate force; in the case of an armed offender this may result in the offender being shot.

=== Categories of firearms prior to 2019 changes ===
Firearms in New Zealand fell into one of four categories:

- Pistols are firearms shorter than 762 mm (30 in).
- Restricted weapons include machine guns, selective-fire assault rifles, grenades and rocket launchers. This category also includes some non-firearm weapons such as pepper spray. Cabinet can declare things to be restricted weapons by regulation.
- Military-style semi-automatics (MSSAs) include semi-automatic rifles and shotguns that have any of the following components:
  - A folding or telescopic butt
  - A bayonet lug
  - A military pattern free-standing pistol grip
  - A flash suppressor
  - A magazine that holds more than 7 rounds; magazines holding up to 10 rounds may be modified to carry 7 rounds. The limit on rimfire is 10 rounds per magazine.
  - A detachable magazine that holds more than 10 rounds.
- A Category firearms were those that do not fall into any other category, and are the vast majority of legally-owned firearms in New Zealand, and support a surprisingly wide number of types. For example, semi-automatic AR-15 style rifles were permitted in this category provided they can only hold 7 or less rounds as well as meeting the other criteria.

Registration was not required under the law but the police carry out a regime similar to registration for all but "A Category" firearms. Firearms in any other category required a "permit to procure" before they are transferred.

=== Categories of firearms after 2019 changes ===
- Pistols – Semi-automatic pistols now must meet the definition of a "small semi-automatic pistol" and have an overall length of 400mm or less, have a barrel length of 101mm or more, as well as be a calibre approved by the Commissioner of Police that goes no faster than 1600fps. Semi-automatic pistols are now classified as prohibited weapons. A weapon like an AR-15 style pistol is no longer included in this category and are now restricted firearms.
- Restricted weapons include machine guns, selective-fire assault rifles, grenades and rocket launchers. This category also includes some non-firearm weapons such as pepper spray. As of late 2019 all semi auto centre-fire rifles and any rifle or rifle magazine capable of holding more than 10 rounds now fall into the restricted category, as do box magazine fed shotguns and shotguns with a magazine capacity of over 5 cartridges (both pump-action and semi-auto) . Semi-auto tubular magazine shotguns not holding more than 5 rounds and semi-auto rim-fire rifles not holding more than 10 rounds in a magazine are exempt. Cabinet can declare things to be restricted weapons by regulation.
- Prohibited Firearms are a new category of firearms requiring additional endorsements, these include pump-action shotguns that is capable of being used with a detachable magazine, A pump-action shotgun that holds more than 5 rounds, A pump action centrefire rifle capable of being used with detachable magazines, A centrefire pump-action with a non detachable magazine that is capable of holding more than 10 rounds as well as All semi-automatic firearm other than:
  - A rim-fire that holds no more than 10 rounds,
  - A semi-automatic shotgun with a non-detachable tubular magazine holding no more than 5 rounds of that firearms chamber size.
  - A small semi-automatic pistol.
- Military-style semi-automatics – As of late 2019 the MSSA category no longer exists with all centre-fire semi-auto rifles now in the restricted category. Rim-fire rifles holding more than 10 cartridges also now fall into the restricted class. Shotguns with a capacity of over 5 shells or fed by a box magazine are also restricted. All magazines holding more than 10 rounds are also restricted. Exempted semi-auto long arms include: rim fire rifles holding 10 rounds or less, and shotguns only with tubular magazines and a capacity of five rounds or less.
- A Category firearms are those that do not fall into any other category, and are the vast majority of legally-owned firearms in New Zealand. As of late 2020 the A category no longer includes centre-fire semi-autos (except shotguns with a tubular magazine of 5 rounds or less). Rim-fire semi-autos with a magazine capacity of 10 or less are A category, as are all manual action rifles with a capacity of 10 rounds or less. There is no restriction on the barrel length of a firearm as long as its overall length is over 762mm (30").
- Prohibited ammunition
- Tracer ammunition – Projectiles containing an element that enables the trajectory of the projectiles to be observed.
- Enhanced-penetration ammunition – Projectiles that have a steel or tungsten carbide penetrator intended to achieve better penetration.
- Armour-piercing ammunition – Projectiles intended to penetrate or perforate armour plate and ceramic armours, typically achieved through the use of hardened or specialised core materials.
- Incendiary ammunition (excluding flares for flare guns) – Projectiles designed to provide an incendiary effect on impact with the target.
- Explosive ammunition – Projectiles containing a high-explosive charge that detonates on impact with or in close proximity to the target.
- Multi-purpose ammunition – Armour-piercing incendiary ammunition in which the incendiary compound is replaced by a high-explosive charge to provide a blast, fragmentation, and incendiary effect as well as an armour-piercing effect.
- Discarding-sabot ammunition (excluding shotgun cartridges) – Small-diametre projectiles designed to pierce armour that are placed into a supporting plug (a sabot) and then pushed down the bore as an assembly; the sabot is stripped off when the assembly leaves the barrel.
- Multi-projectile ammunition (excluding shotgun ammunition) – Ammunition that has the ability to fire multiple projectiles in a single shot (for example, duplex ammunition).
- Chemical or biological carrier ammunition (excluding projectiles for any device designed and intended solely for any medical, surgical, veterinary, scientific, agricultural, industrial, or other similar lawful purpose) – Projectiles that have the ability to carry a chemical or biological agent.
- Flechettes (excluding projectiles designed and intended solely for any bolt gun, stud gun, humane killer, deer net gun, nail gun, or a pistol that is part of rocket-throwing or line-throwing equipment) – Lightweight, fin-stabilised projectiles, fired from a sabot, with an aerodynamic shape and small frontal area to minimise air resistance.

To possess prohibited ammunition need to be either A director or curator of a bona fide museum or bona fide collector of ammunition.

Registration is not required under the law but the police carry out a regime similar to registration for all firearms other than "A Category". Firearms in any other category require a "permit to procure" before they are transferred.

=== Firearm licence ===
Except under the direct supervision of a licence holder, a person who possesses or uses firearms needs to hold a firearms licence issued by the police. New Firearms licences are issued for 5 years and renewals thereafter for 10 years, but can be revoked at any time if police believe the person is no longer fit and proper to possess a firearm.

Visitors to New Zealand can apply from overseas for a 1-year visitor's licence based on their existing licence in their country of residence, though frequent visitors are encouraged to apply for a 10-year licence. Licence holders who possess or use pistols, restricted or prohibited firearms, as well as collectors, require additional endorsements. Firearms dealers and their employees need an annual dealer's licence for their place of business. Only licence holders can buy, sell, or exchange firearms; permits to procure are needed for restricted firearms and licence holders must have appropriate and current endorsements. Importing or exporting personally owned firearms requires additional permits, and the importer or exporter must be a current licence holder with appropriate endorsements.

To become licensed, the applicant must be a fit and proper person over the age of 16. They also need to have adequate secure storage for firearms, attend a safety programme administered by the Mountain Safety Council, pass a written safety test, pay the requisite fee, and supply passport-standard photographs with their application. Police also individually interview the applicant and two referees, one of whom must be a close relative and the other unrelated, to determine the applicant's suitability for a licence. The applicant's residence is also visited to check for appropriate storage of firearms and ammunition and to ensure any other people living there are not a security risk.

Having criminal associations or a history of domestic violence almost always leads to a licence being refused. An application can be refused if the applicant has indicators of drug or alcohol abuse, criminal associations, a history of domestic violence, or a physical, mental health or disability issue that would prevent them possessing or using a firearm safely. Previous denied applications or revoked licences may also be cause for denial. The Gangs Act 2026 also explicitly bans gang members from acquiring a firearms licence.

==== Other categories ====
A standard licence allows the use of "A Category" firearms. To possess firearms of another category, one must receive an endorsement by meeting additional requirements:

B Endorsement – Target (competition) pistols

- Applicant must be a current financial member of a pistol club, and have attended at least 12 club shoots in the last 6 months before they can apply
- Applicant must be sponsored by their club
- Applicant must attend at least 12 club activities (either at their home club or to another recognised club) in a financial year
- Pistols must be of an approved sporting type
- Pistols can only be carried to and from the range in a locked container with ammunition in a separate container or to a gunsmith
- Pistols may only be shot on a police-approved pistol club range

C Endorsement – Restricted weapons

- Applicant must provide proof of a need to own restricted weapons, such as for collecting and movie making
- Firearms must be stored in an inoperable condition
- Firearms cannot be used with live ammunition, but are allowed to fire blanks for movie making and re-enacting
- Firearms can only be transported to an approved display venue, re-enactment event or to another collector for sale

D Endorsement – Dealers licence

- Applicant must renew the endorsement annually
- Applicant must maintain a written record of firearm purchases and sales
- Applicant must maintain additional security requirements
- If selling restricted weapons, applicant must receive endorsements for restricted weapons

E Endorsement – Military-style semi-automatics

- A new class of restricted weapon that was created after the Aramoana shooting spree. At the time, anyone with an MSSA that wanted to keep it in that configuration was given a E endorsement (after going through the vetting and extra security requirements). Those people that did not want the extra hassle and expense of the endorsement converted their rifles into 'A' configuration by removing the components that made it an 'E'.
- After the Christchurch massacre New Zealand enacted an outright ban on most semi-automatic rifles effectively making the e endorsement useless.

F Endorsement – Dealers staff licence

- This class allows an individual working for a dealer to demonstrate a pistol, military-style semi-automatic, or collectable weapon without having to have the corresponding endorsement. Individuals with this endorsement may demonstrate these weapons, but cannot possess one for personal use.

=== Buying and selling ===
Anyone buying firearms or ammunition, whether privately or from a dealer, must show their firearms licence. In addition, a permit to procure must be obtained prior to the transfer of pistols, military-style semi-automatics and restricted weapons. Sales can be made by mail-order, but a police officer must sign the order form to verify that the purchaser has a firearms licence.

== History ==
=== Up to 1983 ===
Firearms first arrived in New Zealand with European traders and were traded in large numbers to the native Māori. This partly led to the Musket Wars of the early 19th century. As a largely agricultural society of the late nineteenth and early twentieth century, long guns were a familiar tool for many people and outdoor pursuits involving guns, such as hunting, were often a source of food, and sometimes provided an income as well. The first gun control laws were enacted in 1845, but early regulations were ineffective until the passage of the Arms Act in 1860, which required licences and registration of firearms and firearm dealers. Early laws were mainly targeted at Māori during the New Zealand Wars in the Waikato and Taranaki, and were largely suspended at the end of the 1880s. By about 1910 the laws were ignored and unenforced, as crime and the threat of political unrest were minimal.

Strikes in 1912 and 1913, a Communist revolution in Russia, and large numbers of ex-military guns coming into the country after World War I were used as justification for a new law in 1920. The new law required the registration of all firearms and issue of a "permit to procure" before a firearm was transferred. Semi-automatic pistols were banned and a special permit was needed for other pistols (e.g. revolvers), with the intent of discouraging the carrying of concealed weapons. Few changes were seen for the next forty years as crime remained low and the country avoided political violence.

Increasing gun crime in the 1960s led to greater police use of registration records, which were generally inaccurate or out-of-date. A project to check the register began in 1967, and found that 66 percent of entries were inaccurate in some way, with many guns not to be found at all. Police thought that the register was largely useless, and that substantial resources would be needed to keep it up-to-date. It was believed that the government would be unlikely to provide the resources required to update the register and that it would be politically difficult to demand registration information from firearm owners.

=== Arms Act 1983 ===
Various new laws were introduced in the 1970s and 80s, proposing more government checks, registration of shotguns (which had been abandoned) and individual licensing. An internal police report in 1982 criticised the proposals, saying there was no evidence that registration of guns helped to solve crimes, and that registration would use time and money better spent on other police work. This policy was adopted by the government in the 1983 Act.

The 1983 Arms Act abandoned registration for most long guns, as Parliament felt it was prohibitively expensive and not particularly useful. The philosophy of the new system was to control users, rather than firearms. Police were required to conduct a background check before a licence would be issued (though existing owners would be issued a licence automatically), but once a person had a licence there was no requirement to register long guns or obtain a permit-to-procure when they were sold or lent. The Arms Code advises firearms owners to transport their firearms in a padded cover or hard case, so guns are now rarely seen in public.

Special restrictions applied to restricted weapons and pistols, which needed to be registered. However, the new sport of target pistol shooting became more popular, and pistol club shooters can own pistols with a special "B" endorsement.

=== Aramoana and the 1992 amendments to the Act ===
After the Aramoana massacre in November 1990, John Banks, the Minister for Police, announced that the government would ban what he and others described as "Rambo-style" weapons and substantially tighten gun laws generally. The law was eventually passed in 1992 and required written permits to order guns or ammunition by mail order, restricted ammunition sales to firearms licence holders, added photographs to firearms licences, required licence holders to have secure storage for firearms at their homes (which would be inspected before a licence was issued), and, controversially, required all licence holders to be re-vetted for new licences, which would be valid for only 10 years.

The law also created the new category of "military-style semi-automatic", which like the Federal Assault Weapons Ban two years later in the United States, mainly covered the appearance rather than the functionality of the guns. These required a special endorsement, security and registration in the same manner as pistols, but could be used wherever A-category guns could. However, sales of high-capacity magazines and other parts distinguishing MSSA guns from the latter was not regulated, creating a legal loophole which was exploited by criminals afterwards.

In 2019 after the Christchurch mosque shootings John Banks said that he was "haunted" by not being able to persuade his cabinet colleagues to ban semi-automatic guns after the Aramoana massacre in 1990.

=== Thorp Report 1997 ===
After two shootings by police in 1995, the government ordered an inquiry into police procedures for storing and using firearms. Before the review started, massacres overseas at Dunblane, Scotland, and Port Arthur, Australia led the government to expand the scope of the review to encompass gun control generally. The police reported in May 1996 that the system was sound and that no major changes were needed.

The government decided in August 1996 to order an independent report, this one led by former judge Sir Thomas Thorp. His report was released in June 1997 and was the most comprehensive and detailed review of the 150 years of firearms controls in New Zealand. Thorp's report explored how New Zealand had arrived at its existing legislation, its underlying principles, its effectiveness compared to other countries, its administration and cost. Thorp made numerous detailed recommendations in 28 different areas. His recommendations called for many new restrictions on legal gun ownership, including setting up a separate Firearms Authority to overhaul the licensing process, restricting ammunition sales to just the firearms owned, banning various firearms features, that licences be renewed every three years to keep track of changes of address and that all guns be registered. The recommendation for a register was particularly unpopular with firearm owners.

Criminologist Greg Newbold appraised Thorp's recommendations and concluded that while Thorp's report was a valuable snapshot of firearms and their use in New Zealand, it would be politically difficult to implement most recommendations and would depend on the additional resources the government was prepared to devote to implementing them, though he doubted their cost effectiveness in any case. Newbold also argued that none of Thorp's recommendations would have prevented any of the post-1990 massacres, because criminals would still have access to unlawful guns that were not subject to any controls, in any case only another massacre would generate enough political will to implement Thorp's recommendations.

=== Arms Amendment Bills 2 and 3 (1999 to 2012) ===
In April 1999, in anticipation of the APEC summit September of that year the Arms Amendment Act 1999 was passed, giving the power to authorise "any foreign personal protection officer" to carry "firearms, airguns, pistols, and restricted weapons, and such quantities and types of ammunition as are specified...", but this automatically expired on 30 September 1999.

The National government in 1999, its last year in office, introduced an Arms Amendment (No. 2) Bill to implement the recommendations, and the bill was supported by the new Labour government. After the strong weight of submissions made against the bill when it was in select committee, the government was persuaded that the changes were unneeded and would be difficult to implement. Due to the opposition, the bill was withdrawn. The government then introduced a much reduced Arms Amendment (No. 3) Bill, which increased penalties for distribution, manufacture and use of illegal weapons. It has been in select committee since 2005, and the government has not shown any sign of proceeding with it. In March 2012, an order of the day for a second reading of the Arms Amendment (No. 3) Bill was discharged.

=== 2009–2018 ===
In August 2009, the police decided that any firearm, including single-shot bolt-action rifles, with a free-standing pistol grip that could allow the firearm to be shot inaccurately from the hip would be defined as an MSSA. However, the High Court rejected this attempt in Lincoln v Police [2010] BCL 194; 33 TCL 11/2. Parliament subsequently amended the Arms Act as a result of the court decision.

In 2015, a TV reporter demonstrated how to subvert processes to purchase a gun by mail-order. Police promptly changed their mail-order processes and commenced a criminal investigation.

In March 2016, after Police seized 14 illegally owned MSSA weapons in a raid in south Auckland and 4 officers were shot during an armed siege in Kawerau, Parliament's Law and Order Select Committee announced an Inquiry into issues relating to the illegal possession of firearms in New Zealand. In their final report in June 2017 the committee made 20 recommendations, of which the National government accepted 7 and modified another.

In July 2017 a doomsday prepper Quinn Patterson, 56, used MSSA weapons to kill two property inspectors, wound a contractor accompanying them and skirmish with police for several hours before taking his own life. Even though he was denied a firearms licence in 2016 on the grounds that he was not a "fit and proper person", he befriended a former soldier with a type A licence, bought arms on his name and equipped them with large-capacity magazines, an investigation found later (the friend was sentenced to 12 months of home detention).

The government introduced the Arms (Firearm Prohibition Orders and Firearms Licences) Amendment Bill to implement several of the recommendations shortly before the 2017 election but it lapsed with the change of government. It was subsequently drawn as a member's bill but it failed to pass at the first reading. The Minister also directed Police to improve their administrative processes and consultation with the firearms community.

Prime Minister Jacinda Ardern was the chair of an executive committee which in 2018 ushered through amendments to the Arms Regulations 2002, to allow Police to accept and process various applications concerning firearms licences and weapons transactions electronically. The Arms (Electronic Transactions) Amendment Regulations 2018 were published in the Gazette on 20 December 2018. Previously under the Arms Act, if someone wanted to become a gun dealer, get a firearms licence, import a restricted weapon, or get a permit to buy a military-style semi-automatic, they had to physically deliver an application to their nearest police station. The regulations also allow for a buyer of a restricted weapon to show that weapon to police by video call – whereas in the past they had to take it into the station.

=== Christchurch mosque shootings ===
In the wake of the mosque shootings in Christchurch, Prime Minister Ardern announced: "Our gun laws will change, now is the time... People will be seeking change, and I am committed to that." Ardern continued by stating, "There have been attempts to change our laws in 2005, 2012 and after an inquiry in 2017. Now is the time for change." Attorney-General David Parker was later quoted as saying that the government would ban semi-automatic guns, but he subsequently backtracked, saying that the government had not yet committed to anything and that regulations around semi-automatic weapons was "one of the issues" the government would consider. On 20 March 2019, Ardern announced that all military style semi-automatics and assault rifles would be banned. The first step in this process was taken on 21 March by reclassifying most semi-automatic firearms as "military style semi-automatic firearms" for the purpose of the Arms Act 1983, pursuant to section 74A(c) of the statute.

=== 2019–2022 ===
On 10 April 2019, the Government passed the Arms (Prohibited Firearms, Magazines, and Parts) Amendment Act 2019, banning semi-automatic firearms, magazines, and parts. The Arms Amendment Bill was supported by all parties except the opposition ACT Party's sole MP David Seymour. In addition, the government announced an amnesty and buy-back scheme for prohibited firearms and components, which was later extended to 20 December 2019. As part of the buy-back program, the New Zealand Police organised a series of nationwide local collection events for gun owners to hand in prohibited firearms. By 22 July, over 2,000 guns had been handed in at buyback events in Auckland and Wellington over the past weekend.

On 22 July 2019, Prime Minister Ardern announced a second series of gun reforms including creating a national firearms register, tighter restrictions on who can obtain a firearms licence, and a ban on overseas visitors buying guns in New Zealand while still allowing them to bring personal firearms into the country. The New Zealand Police's union, the Police Association, has supported the establishment of a national gun register and welcomed the government's proposed reforms. Police Minister Stuart Nash announced that the Government would be drafting a new bill to codify these proposed reforms, which would be in August with a three-month select committee process to follow. In late August, a draft version of the Government's proposed new gun laws was leaked to the opposition National Party. National gun spokesperson Brett Hudson claimed that new legislation could lead to doctors "dobbing" in patients. On 13 September 2019, Prime Minister Ardern and Police Minister Nash formally announced that the Arms Legislation Bill would be introduced in late September. The bill would create a firearms register in order to stop the flow of guns to criminal groups. It attracted criticism from the National Party and gun lobby groups, who claimed it would punish lawful firearm owners and gun clubs instead of criminals. According to Al Jazeera and Reuters, more than 19,100 firearms and 70,800 gun accessories have been surrendered to the gun amnesty as of mid September 2019. According to the Small Arms Survey, New Zealand has the 17th highest rate of civilian gun ownership with 1.5 million firearms distributed over a population of under 5 million. The bill was approved on 18 June 2020 and commenced on 25 June.

On 5 February 2022 the government introduced a new law the Firearms Prohibition Order (FPO) Bill for its first reading. On 9 August it passed unanimously, allowing courts to prohibit specific criminal offenders from possessing firearms for 10 years.

On 31 May 2022 it was announced that a five-year $13 million contract for a gun registration database had been signed with the Objective Corporation, an Australian firm.

In early November 2022, the Government introduced the Arms Act Amendment Bill to stop gun licences from expiring until Police were able to resolve a backlog of renewing firearms licences. At the time, there were 12,000 people on the waitlist for a new firearms licence. Of this figure, half had been on the waitlist for six months or longer, 1569 had been waiting for at least a year, and 72 have been waiting for two years or more.

On 30 November 2022, a new firearms regulator called the Firearms Safety Authority was established within the New Zealand Police. In addition, the New Zealand Government established a national firearms register.

=== Arms Act 2026 ===
On 28 July 2026, the Sixth National Government passed legislation replacing the Arms Act 1983 with the new Arms Act 2026. This legislation separated the Firearms Safety Authority from the police, eased licensing and gun dealership rules, and banned gang members from having gun licenses.

== Notable groups ==
=== Enforcement ===
The New Zealand Police administer and enforce the Arms Act 1983. New Zealand is one of the few countries in the world where police officers routinely go unarmed, with any issued weapons typically carried in patrol cars rather than on the officers. However, the Police Association, which represents police officers themselves, has called for gun registration and routine arming of police because officers report that they more frequently encounter criminals who are prepared to use firearms against police, or find firearms at crime scenes or during the execution of search warrants.

=== Lobby groups ===
The New Zealand Police Association, the police union / service association, has repeatedly lobbied for greater access to firearms for police officers, as well as stricter regulations on licensed firearm owners.

Previously influential groups that are generally no longer active include the Coalition for Gun Control, and Gunsafe NZ. These groups were led by activist Philip Alpers and Mike Meyrick, a former police officer and lawyer.

A new lobby group, Gun Control NZ, was launched in May 2019 in response to the Christchurch attacks.

=== Positions of political parties ===
New Zealand's main political parties, Labour and National, generally treat gun control as a bi-partisan issue. Both supported the passage of the Arms Amendment (No. 3) Bill.

The Outdoor Recreation party was formed in 2001 to support hunting and sport fishing. It failed to gain any seats in 2002, and again in 2005, when, with the United Future party, it contested the election.

The Green Party supports an increase in legislative restrictions on public access to firearms. The Greens' policies include the full ban of private ownership of all semi-automatic firearms and the reintroduction of a national firearms registry.

The New Zealand First party supports the rights of New Zealanders to own and use firearms safely and responsibly for hunting, sport, pest control, target shooting, and Home Defence (Castle doctrine). The party does not support calls for universal gun registration, preferring the licensing of individual users. New Zealand First believes restrictions on firearm ownership by type should be dictated by functionality rather than appearance.

The ACT Party was the only party to vote against the Arms Amendment Bill. The ACT party oppose the ban on semi-automatics, oppose calls for an arms register and also oppose magazine restrictions for firearms. After the Christchurch Massacre, the ACT party claimed they supported change but argued that the legislation parliament passed was rushed and unjust.

== Statistical indicators ==
The Thorp inquiry found that reliable information was not available to answer basic questions about the number and types of firearms owned, used, traded, sold by the army, lost, stolen, or destroyed; people owning and using firearms legally or illegally; surrendered, revoked or refused firearms licences; re-licensing compliance; crime committed with firearms; and the cost of administering licensing and enforcement.

=== Firearms licence holders ===
Nearly 250,000 people held a New Zealand Firearms licence in 2018. In 1997, Thorp found that in 1982, prior to the introduction of lifetime licences, police had estimated there were about 300,000 firearms owners who could apply for a lifetime firearms licence under the 1983 Act. By 1991, there were 327,000 lifetime licence holders who were required to reapply for a 10-year photographic licence or surrender their lifetime licence. Thorp estimated that by 1998 only 204,000 would do so, given a 60% call-in compliance rate, which suggested between 90,000 and 120,000 licence holders had not responded to the call-in notices, likely because of difficulties in contacting them. Poor record keeping by police of surrendered lifetime licences prior to 1994 further complicated matters.

=== Gun ownership ===
The number of people who own or use guns in New Zealand is not known. Anyone over the age of 18 can own or use an air gun or antique firearm; these do not need to be registered provided the gun is not a restricted weapon. A range of firearms that are used as agricultural or construction tools do not require a firearms licence. Holding a firearms licence does not imply a person owns the gun they possess or use; the firearm could be owned by a business or organisation, club, dealer, or another licence holder, or be part of a deceased person's estate and held on trust for safekeeping. Thorp noted that a 1989 survey found that 9% of licence holders did not own a firearm. A survey conducted for Thorp's 1997 review found 20% of New Zealand's households had a gun, with about 1.8 gun users per household. These statistics provide an estimate between 350,000 and 400,000 New Zealand gun users.

=== Civilian armory ===
There are an estimated 1.5 million firearms in the New Zealand civilian armory, although this figure may simply be extrapolated from estimates made by Thorp in 1997 and could therefore be an overestimate.

In 1997, Thorp estimated there were between 750,000 and a million firearms in New Zealand, He also believed about three-fifths were rifles and about two-fifths were shotguns, though the exact ratio is uncertain because different surveys used provided different estimates. Details of the majority of firearms are often known only to their owners.

The number of unlawfully held firearms is even more uncertain. Thorp estimated that there were between 10,000 and 25,000 firearms owned by people with criminal intent, along with possibly another 100,000 "grey guns", held by unlicensed individuals, but not intended for criminal purposes.

Since only pistols and military style semi-automatic firearms need to be registered with police, their numbers are more certain, though changes in legislation mean that if a firearm was not registered at the time, it might remain unregistered.

=== Information sources ===
Apart from the Thorp report, most statistical information about firearms numbers, licensing and trading is available only from the New Zealand Police. Although the police publish some information in annual reports or when reporting to Select Committees, most information is made available only as a result of requests for Official Information. In June 2018, police announced that they would proactively publish responses to Official Information Act requests that contained data or information about firearms that might be of wide public interest.

== See also ==
- 2007 New Zealand police raids
- Tasers in New Zealand
