= DPL =

DPL may refer to:

== Institutions ==
- Delhi Public Library, Located in Delhi, India
- Denver Public Library, located in Colorado, USA
- Detroit Public Library, located in Michigan, USA
- Dunedin Public Libraries, located in New Zealand

== Places ==
- Designated place, a Canadian census designation for unincorporated communities in the 100–1,000 population range
- Dipolog Airport, located in Zamboanga del Norte, Philippines with IATA code DPL
- The FAA identifier for Duplin County Airport

== Computing and electronics ==
- .dpl, the filename extension of Borland software libraries
- Descriptor Privilege Level, the highest CPU resource access level on the x86 architecture
- Dolby Pro Logic, a surround sound processing technology
- Digital Light Processing, a projector technology
- Datamax Printer Language, a printer page description language
- Driver: Parallel Lines, the fourth game in the Driver video game series

== Science and medicine ==
- Dipropyllysergamide, a psychedelic drug

== Groups, organizations, companies ==
- DPL Inc., a public utility in west central Ohio, USA
- Delmarva Power and Light Company, a subsidiary of Exelon
- Democratic Party (Luxembourg), a liberal political party
- Democrats for Liechtenstein, a national-conservative party in Liechtenstein
- Dhaka Premier League, a club List A cricket tournament in Bangladesh
- Delhi Premier League T20, a cricket tournament

== Others ==
- Debian Project Leader, head of the Debian linux distribution
- Defensive Patent License
- Diagnostic peritoneal lavage, a procedure used to determine whether blunt trauma victims require surgery
- Digital Private Line, a squelch system used by Motorola
- Denied Party List, Denied trade screening

== See also ==
- Dp1 (disambiguation)
- DPI (disambiguation)
