= Dp1 =

DP1 may refer to:

- British Rail DP1
- Sigma DP1
- Prostaglandin D2 receptor
- Deadpool (film), 2016 Fox Studios Marvel Comics X-Men cinematic franchise superhero film; first in a series of "Deadpool" films.

== See also ==
- DPI (disambiguation)
- DPL (disambiguation)
- DP (disambiguation)
