= DPI =

DPI may refer to:

== Organizations ==
- Department of Public Information, related to U.N.
- Daffodil Polytechnic Institute, an educational institution of Bangladesh
- Dhaka Polytechnic Institute, an educational institution of Bangladesh
- Disabled Peoples' International, an international non-governmental organization
- Discovery Partners Institute, an initiative of the University of Illinois
- Department of Primary Industries (New South Wales), a NSW government department
- Department of Primary Industries (Queensland), a Queensland government department

== Computing and electronics ==
- Deep packet inspection, a form of computer network packet filtering
- Digital program insertion
- Dots per inch, a measure of printing, display or image resolution
  - Mouse DPI, a measure of mouse speed
- SystemVerilog DPI (Direct Programming Interface)
- Data processing inequality
- Digital public infrastructure

== Sports ==
- Daytona Prototype International, a class of car in sports car racing
- Defensive pass interference

== Other ==
- Disposable personal income
- Dry powder inhaler, a drug delivery device
- Dual polarisation interferometry
- Dye penetrant inspection, a non-destructive testing method
- Diphenyleneiodonium (chemistry)
- Polydispersity index (PDI), now largely replaced by Dispersity (Đ) in current literature

== See also ==
- DPI-MCAA, a Multilateral Competent Authority Agreement on automatic exchange of information on income derived through digital platforms

== Other uses ==
- DPL (disambiguation)
- Dp1 (disambiguation)
- DP (disambiguation)
