= DPS =

DPS may refer to:

== Arts and entertainment ==
- Dps (band), a Japanese alt rock band
- Damage per second, in video games
- Dead Poets Society, a 1989 film
- The Dead Pop Stars, a Japanese hard rock band
- Double page spread, two facing pages in a periodical with connected content
- Dramatists Play Service, an American theatrical publisher

== Government, law and politics ==
=== Government agencies ===
- Department for Protection and Security, France
- Department of Public Safety, in US state and local government
- Public Safety Canada, (formally Public Safety and Emergency Preparedness), Canada

=== Policing units ===
- Diplomatic Protection Squad, New Zealand Police
- Dorozhno-Patrulnaya Sluzhba (Russian: Дорожно-Патрульная Служба, ДПС), Russia's road traffic police
- Directorate of Professional Standards, London Metropolitan Police

=== Political parties ===
- Democratic Party of Socialists of Montenegro, a political party in Montenegro
- Department of Protection-Security (Département Protection et Sécurité), a branch of the National Front (FN) political party of France
- Dvizhenie za Prava i Svobodi (Bulgarian: Движение за Права и Свободи, ДПС), known as the Movement for Rights and Freedoms, a political party in Bulgaria

=== Other uses in government and law ===
- Desha Putra Sammanaya, a military decoration in Sri Lanka
- Designated Premises Supervisor, in British law the person with day-to-day responsibility for a premises where alcohol is sold
- Deposit Protection Service, a company authorised by the UK government to run Tenancy deposit schemes

== Schools ==
=== United States ===
- Dalton Public Schools, Georgia
- Dearborn Public Schools, Michigan
- Decatur Public Schools District 61, Illinois
- Denver Public Schools, Colorado
- Detroit Public Schools, Michigan
- Durham Public Schools, North Carolina

=== Elsewhere ===
- DPS Academy, a now-defunct school in the United Arab Emirates
- Delhi Public School, a chain of schools, based in India, estb. 1949
- Delhi Private School, Dubai, United Arab Emirates
- Delhi Private School, Sharjah, United Arab Emirates
- Divisional Public School, Lahore and Faisalabad, Pakistan
- Dawood Public School, Karachi, Pakistan

== Science ==
- Dps (DNA-binding proteins from starved cells), a class of proteins
- 2,2'-Dipyridyldisulfide, an oxidizing agent and a reagent for forming 2-pyridinethiol esters in the Corey-Nicolaou macrolactonization
- Distinct population segment, a population considered for protection under the U.S. Endangered Species Act
- Division for Planetary Sciences within the American Astronomical Society

== Technology ==
- Data Processing Systems Engineer, a flight engineer responsible for data processing systems in a space flight
- Descent Propulsion System, a rocket engine used in Apollo's Lunar Module
- Degrees per second, a unit for measuring angular velocity
- Direct Print Standard, part of PictBridge standard
- Display PostScript, an on-screen display system
- Dynamic positioning system, a means to automatically maintain a ship's position and heading by using her own propellers and thrusters
- DPS protocol, a quantum key distribution protocol
- DPS (Data Processing System), the designation of several lines of computer in the List of Groupe Bull products

== Other uses ==
- Dividend per share
- DPS Compound, Baguio, Philippines
- Deltic Preservation Society, a British railway preservation group
- Doctor of Professional Studies, a professional doctorate
- Ngurah Rai International Airport (IATA code), on Bali, Indonesia

== See also ==
- DP (disambiguation)
