= DP =

DP may refer to:

== In arts and entertainment ==
=== Film, television, and theatre ===
- Danny Phantom, an animated television series
- David Production, a Japanese animation studio
- Deepika Padukone, Indian film actress, often referred to by the acronym DP
- Digital Playground, an American pornographic movie studio
- Director of photography, a job in filmmaking
- Dixon Place, a theater organization in New York City
- D.P. (TV series), a South Korean television series

=== Music ===
- Daft Punk, an electronic band
- Dead Poetic, a music group
- Deep Purple, a rock music group
- Dominant parallel, a type of chord
- dp (album), a 2005 album by Daniel Powter
- Drowning Pool, an American heavy metal music group

=== Other media ===
- The Daily Pennsylvanian, the University of Pennsylvania's student newspaper
- Dark Prince from Clash Royale
- Deadpool, a Marvel Comics comic book character
- Display picture or avatar, in gaming and online, a graphical representation of a user or their character
- Doom Patrol, a comic book series
- H. G. Wells, author; used "D. P." as a pseudonym
- Pokémon Diamond and Pearl, a video game
  - Seasons of the Pokémon anime based on the video game:
    - Pokémon the Series: Diamond and Pearl
    - Pokémon: Diamond and Pearl: Battle Dimension
    - Pokémon: Diamond and Pearl: Galactic Battles
    - Pokémon: Diamond and Pearl: Sinnoh League Victors
- Dragon Punch, a move in many fighting video games

== Businesses and organizations ==
=== Political parties ===
- Democratic Party (disambiguation), a name shared by many political parties
- Democrazia Proletaria, a former left-wing political party in Italy
- Deutsche Partei, a German political party
- Labour Party (Lithuania) (Darbo Partija), a political party in Lithuania

=== Other businesses and organizations ===
- The Detroit Partnership, a service-learning organization at the University of Michigan
- Devon Preparatory School (Devon Prep), an American private school
- DigiPen Institute of Technology, a university in Redmond, Washington
- Distributed Proofreaders, an organisation related to Project Gutenberg
- Dorset Police, the territorial police force responsible for policing Dorset, England
- DP World, a logistics company based in the United Arab Emirates
- First Choice Airways, formerly Air 2000 (IATA airline code DP 1987–2008)
- Paon DP, a Japanese video game developer
- Pobeda Airlines (IATA airline code DP since 2014)

== Law ==
- Death penalty
- Due process

== People ==
- Dan Patrick (sportscaster), an American sportscaster
- Deepika Padukone, Indian film actress, often referred to by the acronym DP
- H. G. Wells, author; used "D. P." as a pseudonym

== Science, technology, and mathematics ==
=== Computing and software ===
- DP (complexity), or difference polynomial time, a computational complexity class
- Data processing
- Software design pattern, a reusable solution to a common problem in software design
- Device-independent pixel, a unit representing an abstraction of a pixel for use by an application
- Digital Performer, an audio software package for the Apple Macintosh and Windows
- DisplayPort, a computer display interface specification
- Double Parity, as used in RAID-DP, a non-standard implementation of RAID
- Dual processors, a computing component with two independent processing units
- Dynamic positioning, a computer-controlled system to maintain a vessel's position and heading

=== Logic ===
- Disjunction property, a typical metalogical property of intuitionistic theories
- Drinker paradox, a theorem of classical predicate logic

=== Mathematics ===
- Davis–Putnam algorithm, for checking the validity of a first-order logic formula
- Decimal places, a particular number of digits in positional notation that convey a specific quantity
- Differential privacy, a system for publicly sharing information while withholding information about individuals in the dataset
- Dirichlet process, a stochastic process corresponding to an infinite generalization of the Dirichlet distribution
- Dynamic programming, a method for solving a complex problem by breaking it down into a collection of simpler subproblems, used in several fields

=== Medicine ===
- Delusional parasitosis, in which individuals incorrectly believe they are infested with parasites
- Depersonalization, a state of feeling detached and/or out of one's body
- Dermal papilla, a cluster of mesenchymal cells that lie at the base of a hair follicle
- Diphallia, in which a male is born with two penises
- Disopyramide, a chemical compound

=== Weapons ===
- Degtyaryov machine gun (Degtyarova pekhotnyi), a Soviet machine gun
- Drill purpose rifle, a rifle that has been altered so that it can be used for drill purposes only
- Dual-purpose gun, a naval artillery mounting designed to engage both surface and air targets

=== Other uses in science and technology ===
- Data point, a unit of measurement or observation
- Degree of polymerization, the number of units in an average polymer chain at a given time during a reaction
- Determiner phrase, in linguistics
- Diametral pitch, the ratio of the number of teeth in a gear to its pitch diameter
- Diffraction pattern, in wave mechanics
- Diffusion pump, a type of vacuum pump
- Diphosgene, a chemical warfare agent
- Discursive psychology, a form of discourse analysis
- Standard instrument departure procedure, a procedure for aircraft

== In sport ==
- Dan Patrick (sportscaster), an American sportscaster
- Daytona Prototype, a type of racing car used in the Rolex Sports Car Series and United SportsCar Championship
- Deportivo Pereira, a Colombian soccer team
- Designated player (softball), a designated batter
- Designated Player Rule, in Major League Soccer
- Detroit Pistons, National Basketball Association
- Double play, in baseball
- Dude Perfect, a trick shot conglomerate

== Other uses ==
- Delegable proxy, a form of voting
- Delivery point, in postal systems
- Depok railway station, Indonesia, station code
- Depository participant, an agent of the depository, in Indian banking
- Dill pickle, a type of pickled cucumber
- Displaced person, WWII term for person forced to leave home region due to invasion
- Divine Principle, the main theological book of the Unification Church
- Donkey punch, slang for a sexual practice
- Dr Pepper, a type of carbonated soft drink
- Double penetration, a variant of group sex
- Down payment
- South Sulawesi (vehicle registration prefix DP)

== See also ==
- DPS (disambiguation)
- Dawn patrol (disambiguation)
- Currency Greek drachma (symbol "₯")
- differentiable programming, abbreviated "∂P"
