= Firearms licence (New Zealand) =

A New Zealand firearms licence is personal to the licence holder and is issued by New Zealand Police to people aged over 16 who are considered to be fit and proper to possess firearms. Endorsements on the licence identify which categories of firearms a licence holder can lawfully possess.

Firearms licence holders can lawfully only procure and own the categories of firearms their licence carries endorsements for. Rifles, shotguns, and airguns can be lawfully owned by anyone who holds a standard, or A-Category, firearms licence and do not need to be registered. However some firearms, such as pistols and military style semi-automatic firearms also need a police permit to procure each specific firearm and these arms need to be registered with police.

An applicant for a firearms licence needs to be aged 16 years or older, attend an approved firearms safety course, pass theoretical and practical examinations about firearms safety and use, have adequate secure storage for firearms, complete the application form, supply suitable identification, provide two referees and pay the prescribed application fees for the licence and any endorsements.

The statutory basis for licensing of firearms use in New Zealand is laid out in the Arms Act 1983 and Arms Regulations. The act is administered by the New Zealand Police, according to policies documented in their Arms Manual (the most recent, 2002 version of which is out of date).

== Applying for a firearms licence ==
In New Zealand, possession of firearms is considered a privilege, rather than a right.

Before applying for a firearms licence, the applicant must:

- Be 16 or older;
- Be a "fit and proper person" to possess and use firearms;
- Attend a safety lecture given by a trainer from the New Zealand Mountain Safety Council or other approved training organisation;
- Pass a written test based on the material in the Arms Code, a booklet written by the Police, with assistance from the New Zealand Mountain Safety Council;
- Have secure storage for firearms at the applicant's home (a gun rack, safe, strongroom or "receptacle of stout construction" is required);
- Provide two referees, one a relative and one not, to vouch for the applicant;
- Supply 2 identical photographs of the applicant that meet specified requirements (passport standard);
- Pay NZ$126.50 at a local PostShop.

Before being issued with a firearms licence:

- A police arms officer will interview the applicant, and their referees;
- A police arms officer inspect the security at the applicant's home, or other designated storage address;

Licences are issued at the discretion of the police. Licences are issued for a period of 10 years. Licences can be refused or revoked if police believe that the applicant or licence holder is not, or ceases to be, a "fit and proper person". The licensing fee is not refundable if the licence is refused or revoked.

If a person already holds a firearms licence they must apply for a new licence well before their old licence expires as the licensing process can take several months. If their old licence expires before a new licence is issued then any firearms that are owned need to be surrendered or transferred to a licensed firearms owner. If their old licence expires before a new licence is applied for then a higher fee needs to be paid.

== The "fit and proper person" test ==
As part of the application for a licence, the police will assess whether the applicant is a fit and proper person to possess firearms. An applicant could be considered not fit and proper if they:

- have been the subject of a protection order;
- have shown no regard for the Arms Act or Arms Regulations;
- have been involved in substance abuse;
- have committed any serious offence, or any crimes involving violence or drugs;
- have committed a series of minor offences (or a serious offence) against the Arms Act;
- have been affiliated with a gang involved in violence;
- have been involved in acts or threats of matrimonial violence;
- have exhibited signs of mental ill health;
- have attempted to commit suicide or other self injurious behaviour

Additionally, self-defense is not considered a valid reason to possess firearms in New Zealand.

There are exemptions from the need for a licence for police, military and related occupations and for the use of firearms when closely supervised by licence-holders. In addition certain types of firearms – such as humane killers, tranquilizer guns, flare pistols, antiques – may be possessed and used without a licence.

== General licence ==
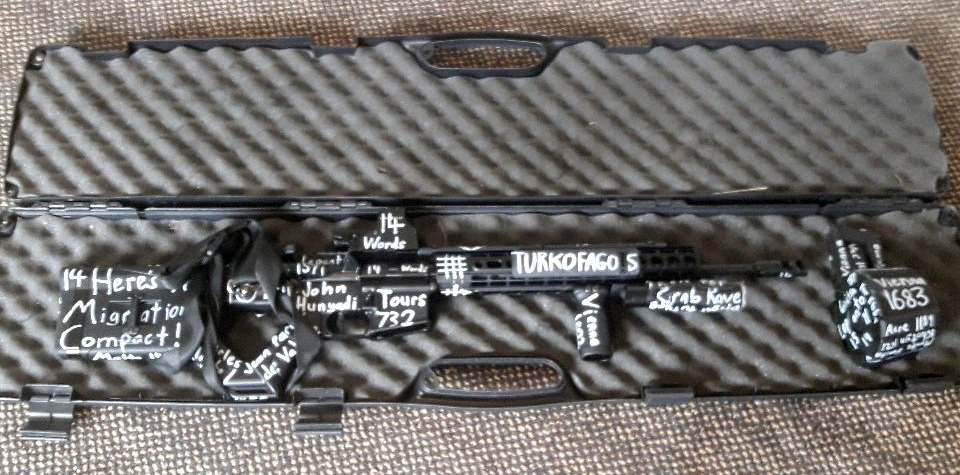
This gun used by the 2019 Christchurch mosque shooter, who held a type A, features a thumbhole stock legally available to him

The "general" (or "type A") licence gives permission to own and use "sporting configuration" firearms. A sporting configuration firearm is a rifle or shotgun that does not meet the legal definition of a military-style semi-automatic (MSSA), "Restricted Weapon" or "pistol". Sporting configuration firearms are not individually registered, and licence-holders may own as many as they wish and buy or sell them freely from/to other licence-holders or dealers.

== Endorsements ==
Under certain circumstances, a licence may carry endorsements to allow the possession and use of other types of weapons, as follows:

| Endorsement | Use |
|---|---|
| B | Allows the holder to possess and use pistols. Issued only to bona fide members of pistol clubs. Weapons held under a "B" endorsement may only be fired at an approved pistol range, and are subject to strict controls on carriage away from the owner's home. |
| C | Allows the holder to possess and use pistols and restricted weapons. Issued only to bona fide collectors, to people for whom a particular weapon has a special significance (e.g. as an heirloom), to museum curators, and to theatre, film and TV production armourers. Weapons held under a "C" endorsement may not be fired with live ammunition, though blanks may be fired for film, TV and theatre purposes. |
| D, F | Special endorsements for firearms dealers. |

Endorsements are issued only after further police vetting, and a higher standard of firearm storage security is required. Each application for an endorsement costs NZ$200.

Weapons other than sporting-configuration rifles and shotguns must be individually registered, and transfer of possession is subject to prior approval by the police.

== Visitors ==
Visitors to New Zealand may be issued a temporary visitor's licence. "B" or "E" endorsements may be included on the licence when appropriate (e.g. an overseas competitor in a pistol shooting competition).

== See also ==
- Gun law in New Zealand
