= Military-style semi-automatic firearms =

Type of weapon

Military-style semi-automatic firearms in New Zealand are those semi-automatic firearms known in the United States as "assault weapons". The phrase is often abbreviated as military-style semi-automatic (MSSA). A New Zealand firearms licence-holder requires an E Category endorsement on their licence before they can possess this type of firearm, and a police-issued permit to procure each firearm is required. Arriving at a clear definition and common understanding of which semi-automatic firearms have a military-style configuration has dominated debate about gun-control legislation in New Zealand since 1992.

The phrase was introduced as part of the 1992 amendment to the Arms Act that was intended to impose stricter controls on military style semi-automatic firearms following the 1990 Aramoana massacre where a lone gunman, who held a lifetime firearms licence, killed 13 people using several different firearms, including a semi-automatic rifle that he fired from the hip at police.

Some semi-automatic firearms that had been sold in a sporting configuration, so that they could be possessed by a person holding a standard (A Category) firearms licence, without endorsements, could be converted to an MSSA simply by adding or changing one part, such as a larger magazine or flash suppressor. If a person had intended to convert an A Category firearm that they already possess, they were required to obtain an E Category endorsement before making the conversion to their firearm, because merely having parts in the person's possession to make the conversion possible made an A Category semi-automatic firearm an MSSA. Following the Christchurch mosque shootings on 15 March 2019, all MSSA's and magazines with a capacity of more than 10 rounds, and any parts enabling the conversion of a semi-automatic firearm to an MSSA, were banned in New Zealand. This ban came into effect on 21 March 2019, with a buy-back operation implemented to purchase pre-existing firearms from current holders.

== Background ==
New Zealand introduced personal lifetime firearms licences in 1984 and, in the process, abandoned a complex and poorly understood process for registering rifles and shotguns that was often not complied with. The existing registers were fragmented and inaccurate and as a result police did not know who owned firearms and could not find many of the guns that were registered. Existing registered gun owners were usually issued with a lifetime licence if they had previously behaved responsibly with their firearms.

On 13 November 1990, Aramoana resident David Gray, after a verbal dispute with his next-door neighbour, went on a shooting rampage that resulted in the deaths of 14 people, including Gray himself, and gunshot injuries to another three people. Another person was injured taking cover. Gray, a firearms licence holder, possessed several firearms, including semi-automatic rifles. Before being apprehended, Gray ran from cover, shooting from the hip at police while daring them to kill him.

Minister of Police, John Banks, hastily drafted legislation to amend the Arms Act, "to prevent another Aramoana massacre" by restricting the configuration, possession and use of semi-automatic weapons, requiring a firearms licence to have a photograph of the licence holder and reducing the term to 10 years with vetting of the licence holder upon relicensing.

== Definition ==
The definition of an MSSA is in the Arms Act, which together with the Arms Regulations, also specifies the controls over possession and use of MSSAs. The Act is administered by the New Zealand Police. The legislated definition of the features of a military style semi-automatic firearm has evolved over time, along with how that legislation is interpreted by police, firearms dealers and firearms licence holders.

The 2013 version of the Arms Code describes a military style semi-automatic firearm as any "self-loading" (i.e. semi-automatic) firearm, other than a pistol, with any of the following features:

- Folding or telescopic butt
- Magazine that holds, or is detachable and has the appearance of holding more than 15 cartridges (for .22 rimfire)
- Magazine that holds more than 7 cartridges, or is detachable and has the appearance of holding more than 10 cartridges (for other than a .22 rimfire)
- Bayonet lug
- Pistol grip as defined by regulation
- Flash suppressor

== Requirements to possess ==
Possession or use of any MSSA requires a firearms licence with either a "C" or "E" endorsement. The "E" endorsement allows MSSAs to be used with live ammunition; while the "C" endorsement is used by museum curators, collectors, film/TV/theatre armourers, etc. To be granted either endorsement, the applicant must demonstrate to police good cause for possessing MSSAs and the application must be supported by two referees who are current endorsement holders, serving members of a firearms-related organisation, bona fide collectors or persons able to demonstrate a genuine long-term interest in firearms. The applicant must also demonstrate a higher standard of security for the storage of weapons than is required for ordinary firearms.

== 2009 reinterpretation ==
On 2 July 2009, the New Zealand Police issued a memorandum advising that the police had reviewed the criteria for classifying weapons as MSSAs; and in particular the interpretation of the phrase 'military pattern free-standing pistol grip' used in the legislation.

Under the new interpretation, many types of thumbhole stocks were now to be considered as pistol grips for the purposes of the Arms Act; any semi-automatic rifle with a grip having either the appearance or function of a military pattern free-standing pistol grip would be regarded by the police as an MSSA. Specifically, a semi-automatic rifle would henceforth be considered an MSSA if it had any of:

- an obvious pistol grip below the trigger guard allowing a full-hand pistol grip, irrespective of whether or not the pistol grip was connected to the stock at the base;
- any addition that connects the pistol grip to the stock or butt in an attempt to make it no longer free standing (such as adding a metal or plastic rod); or
- a second grip forward of the trigger.

This reinterpretation had the effect of re-classifying as MSSAs many weapons previously considered to be sporting-configuration firearms, including the Heckler & Koch SL8 and USC, and the Dragunov sniper rifle. Transitional arrangements were made by the police to allow owners of such weapons to either register them, obtaining the necessary firearms endorsements if required, or dispose of them. The transitional period ended on 31 March 2010.

The reinterpretation has met with resistance from some firearm owners. The National Shooters Association of NZ (formed largely as a result of the reinterpretation) laid a complaint on 12 August 2009 with the Independent Police Conduct Authority regarding the advertising of the change. Proceedings had already been lodged by the Association's president Richard Lincoln at the High Court in Palmerston North on 29 June 2009, aiming to have the revised interpretation overturned.

In a subsequent hearing for an injunction to protect the litigant, Justice McKenzie ruled that the police did not have the power to re-classify any firearm and that their opinion on the extended definition of pistol grips was "inconsequential" and that was a matter for the Court to decide. He also stated that the Court would not be constrained by any other 'opinion'. On 1 March 2010 Justice Mallon released a Reserved Decision upon the Judicial Review, stating that a Military Pattern Free-Standing Pistol grip was not what the Police HQ said it was and that the litigant's H&K SL8 firearm did not have a Military Pattern Free-Standing Pistol Grip. Justice Mallon discussed the proper interpretation of the terms 'Military Pattern' and 'Free-Standing' in detail.

The police have ceased advertising their opinion and removed reference to the "Check Your Stock" campaign from their official website.

== 2012 amendments ==
The "Arms (Military Style Semi-automatic Firearms and Import Controls) Amendment Act 2012" aimed to clarify the MSSA definition in regards to Airsoft and Paintball guns, as well as magazine capacities.

Amendment summary:

- Define a new category, "restricted airguns", as Paintball and Airsoft pistols/rifles either imitating MSSA's, or capable of fully automatic fire.
- Require an import permit for "restricted airguns".
- Specifically exclude "restricted airguns" from the category "especially dangerous airguns", i.e. PCP rifles.
- Allow the use of centerfire magazines with a capacity of 7 rounds that appear to be capable of holding up to 10 rounds.

Intended effect:

- Fully automatic Airsoft and Paintball guns will be legal for import, purchase and use for any person (provided they are allowed to use an airgun in the first place). They will no longer be considered a restricted firearm, will be legal to use in sport and will not require a C-category firearms license.
- Cheaply available imitation firearms, such as plastic airsoft pistols, will no longer be widely available, reducing the number of armed offenders callouts.
- Magazines and firearms designed to hold 10 centerfire rounds (an unofficial international standard, possibly influenced by restrictions in certain American states such as California) can be easily modified to comply with the 7-round A-category restriction by blocking the space required by the last 3 rounds (e.g. welding a short piece of rod inside the bottom of a 10-round magazine).

== 2019 ban ==
On 15 March 2019, a far right white supremacist opened fire in two mosques in Christchurch, killing 51 people and injuring 40. The shooter legally-obtained semi-automatic weapons and high-capacity magazines.

Following this attack, gun law reforms were announced almost immediately, and at 3 pm on 21 March almost all semi-automatic rifles were banned. All magazines over 10 rounds were banned, and in particular centerfire semi-automatic weapons were banned. Such guns must be confirmed by an act of parliament before 30 June 2020 or they will be revoked. A gun buyback has been offered.

== See also ==
- Assault weapon
