= Tasers in New Zealand =

Tasers have been used by the New Zealand Police since March 2010, after trial periods in 2006 and 2007. They originally used the Taser X2 but started replacing them in 2023 with the Taser 10. Civilian possession of Tasers is illegal.

== History ==
The New Zealand Police trialled the use of Tasers in 2006 and 2007. They police began using them in March 2010. Shortly after the roll-out, the police received criticism about the number of people with mental illnesses being targeted with the weapons. By October 2012, Tasers had been activated 212 times throughout the country. Starting in 2015, all frontline police officers began routinely carrying Tasers. Before then, Tasers were only carried when it was determined that there was a likely chance of violence; they were stored in locked boxes in police vehicles. In 2020 the police stopped using Tasers in custodial areas as recommended by the Independent Police Conduct Authority after an incident in Dunedin's police cells.

In 2022 the end of life of the Taser X2 devices that the police was approaching. In 2023 the police were considering updating or replacing their Tasers and stated that they would consult the public before making any decisions. The tasers they were using at the time had a cameras in them, which would deplete the battery. Other models the police were considering did not have a camera, but would activate a body camera when used. In 2024 the police started replacing the X2 with the Taser 10, first in the Southern Police District; the roll-out was expected to take five years. Compared to the X2, the Taser 10 has a higher range and has more probes. The Taser 10 does not have an integrated camera system but the police does not use body cameras.

== Usage ==
The New Zealand Police use the Taser 10 model, manufactured by Axon Enterprise. As of 2023 footage captured by the Tasers are stored in Axon servers in Australia. From March 2010 to July 2015, Tasers had been used 4198 times, of which 47 resulted in injuries. Civilian possession of Tasers is illegal.

A review of Police TASER use found that officers were more likely to use TASERs against men. "In some cases, men were TASERed for non-compliance, or to gain control over a situation when no physical threat or weapon was present".

== See also ==
- Gun law in New Zealand
