= Dawn patrol =

Dawn patrol may refer to:

== In arts and entertainment ==
=== Film ===
- The Dawn Patrol (1930 film), starring Richard Barthelmess and Douglas Fairbanks, Jr.
- The Dawn Patrol (1938 film), a remake featuring Errol Flynn and Basil Rathbone
- Dawn Patrol (2014 film), directed by Daniel Petrie, Jr. and starring Scott Eastwood

=== Gaming ===
- Dawn Patrol (board game), also known as Fight in the Skies
- Dawn Patrol (video game), a flight simulator game by Rowan Software
- The Dawn Patrol, a level in The Jungle Book (video game)

=== Music ===
- Dawn Patrol, an alternate name for the Canadian band Odds
- "Dawn Patrol", a song by Megadeth from their album Rust in Peace
- Dawn Patrol (album), a 1982 album by Night Ranger
- Dawn Patrol, a former name for the American Christian music duo Party Wave

=== Radio and television ===
- The Dawn Patrol (radio show), original name of the Californian morning radio show Dave, Shelly, and Chainsaw
- The Dawn Patrol, an early morning BBC Radio 2 show hosted by Sarah Kennedy
- "The Dawn Patrol", a morning radio show on WEBN in Cincinnati
- "The Dawn Patrol" (The O.C.), an episode of The O.C.

=== Other media ===
- Dawn Patrol, a 2008 novel by Don Winslow
- The Dawn Patrol, a blog by American author Dawn Eden

== Other uses ==
- Operation Dawn Patrol, a five-nation naval and air exercise conducted in the Mediterranean in 1973
- Dawn Patrol, an event at the Albuquerque International Balloon Fiesta

== See also ==
- Patrol (disambiguation)
- Dawn (disambiguation)
