= Device-independent pixel =

Unit of length on computer displays

Device-dependent pixel
- Unit system: Computer-related unit of measurement; not an SI unit.
- Unit of: Length
- Symbol: dp, dip
- Named after: Pixel

Conversions
| 1 dp, dip in ... | ... is equal to ... |
- Inch: 1/160 inch (0.16 mm)
- Pixel: 1 px on 160 dpi screen (Note: depends on device resolution and pixel density)

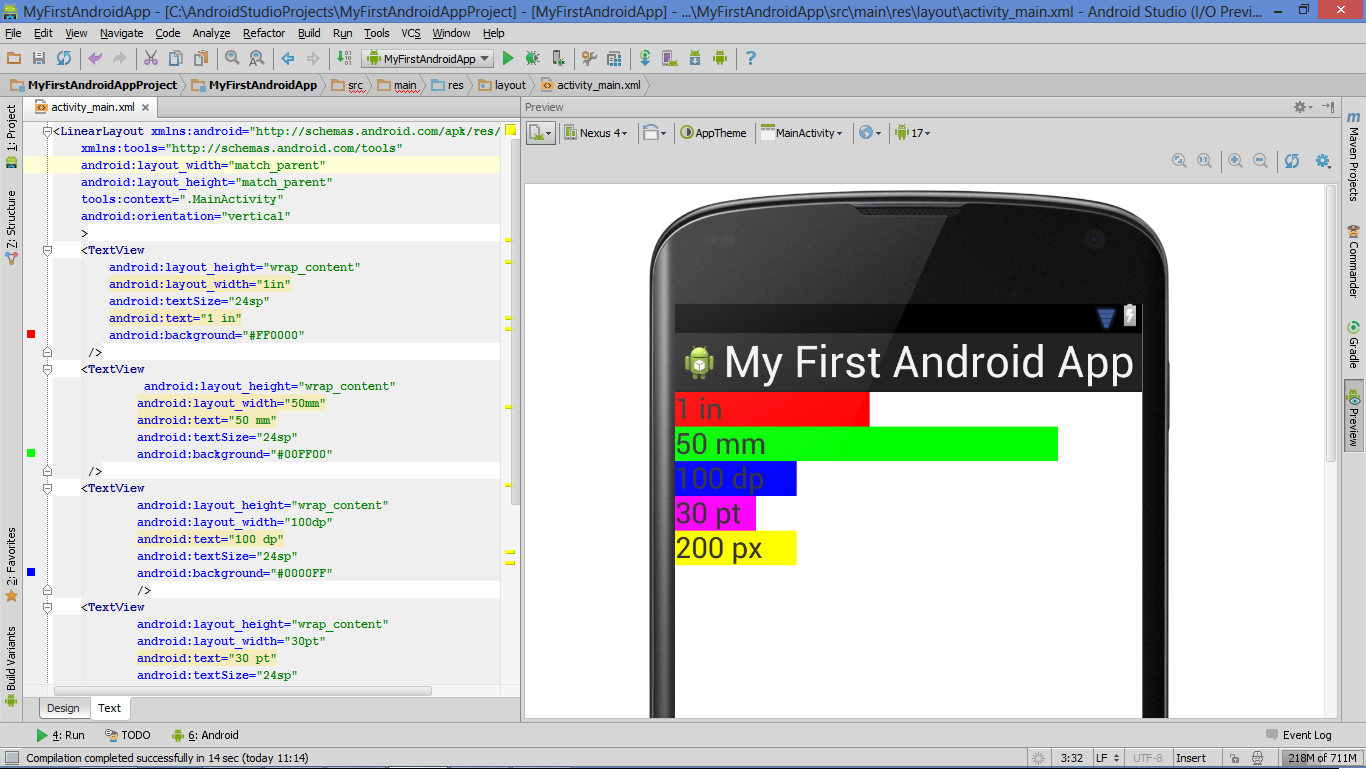
Bar chart length comparison of the virtual units of length, 100 device-dependant pixels (dp) and 200 pixels (px); and physical units of length, 50 millimetres (mm) and 30 points (pt).

A device-independent pixel (also: density-independent pixel, dip, dp) is a unit of length.

A typical use is to allow mobile device software to scale the display of information and user interaction to different screen sizes. The abstraction allows an application to work in pixels as a measurement, while the underlying graphics system converts the abstract pixel measurements of the application into real pixel measurements appropriate to the particular device. For example, on the Android operating system a device-independent pixel is equivalent to one physical pixel on a 160 dpi screen, while the Windows Presentation Foundation specifies one device-independent pixel as equivalent to 1/96th of an inch.

As dp is a physical unit it has an absolute value which can be measured in traditional units, e.g. for Android devices 1 dp equals 1/160 of inch or 0.15875 mm.

While traditional pixels only refer to the display of information, device-independent pixels may also be used to measure user input such as input on a touch screen device.

Bar chart comparing 200 dp, 100 px, 50 mm and 50 pt
200 dp
calc: 200 × 0.6px = 120px (computed)
100 px
100 px
50 mm
50 mm (CSS)
50 pt
50 pt (CSS)
