= Defensive Patent License =

The Defensive Patent License (DPL) is a patent license proposed by Jason Schultz and Jennifer Urban, directors of the Samuelson Law, Technology & Public Policy Clinic at the University of California, Berkeley as a patent licensing equivalent of the GPL copyright license.

It requires entities licensing their patents under the DPL to license all of their patents under the DPL, with free licenses granted to all other DPL participants. DPL participants remain free to launch patent lawsuits against non-participants.

DPL 1.0 was published on November 16, 2013, and a "birthday" celebration held at the Internet Archive. The Internet Archive was designated as the fiscal umbrella organization until it has its own non-profit entity. It was launched on February 28, 2014 at a conference in Berkeley.

== See also ==
- Open Invention Network
- Software patent
