= Arms Act 1983 =

New Zealand legislation

New Zealand Parliament
- Long title: An Act to consolidate and amend the law relating to firearms and to promote both the safe use and the control of firearms and other weapons
- Royal assent: 29 November 1983
- Commenced: 1 June 1984
- Administered by: New Zealand Police

Repealed by
- Arms Act 2026
- Status: Repealed

In New Zealand, the Arms Act 1983 was the primary statute controlling the possession and use of firearms and air guns until it was repealed and replaced by the Arms Act 2026.

== Basic principles of the Act ==
The basic premise of the New Zealand arms control regime is the licensing of individuals as being fit and proper persons to possess firearms. Firearms themselves are not generally registered or licensed, although exceptions exist for pistols, restricted weapons and military-style semi-automatic firearms (MSSAs).

== History of the Act ==
The act came into force on 1 June 1984, replacing the Arms Act 1958 (1958 No 21).

It has subsequently been amended by the following statutes:

- Arms Amendment Act 1985 (1985 No 5)
- Crimes Amendment Act (No 2) 1986 (1986 No 71)
- Arms Amendment Act 1987 (1987 No 166)
- Public Finance Act 1989 (1989 No 44)
- Arms Amendment Act 1989 (1989 No 109) - amendment repealed by Arms Amendment Act 2000 (2000 No 53): section 3
- Regulations (Disallowance) Act 1989 (1989 No 143)
- Arms Amendment Act 1992 (1992 No 95)
- Domestic Violence Act 1995 (1995 No 86)
- Hazardous Substances and New Organisms Act 1996 (1996 No 30)
- Crimes Amendment Act (No 2) 1997 (1997 No 93)
- Postal Services Act 1998 (1998 No 2)
- Anti-Personnel Mines Prohibition Act 1998 (1998 No 111)
- Arms Amendment Act 1999 (1999 No 23)
- Arms Amendment Act 2000 (2000 No 53)
- Visiting Forces Act 2004 (2004 No 59)
- Civil Aviation Amendment Act 2007 (2007 No 89): sections 6 and 12
- Policing Act 2008 (2008 No 72)
- Cluster Munitions Prohibition Act 2009 (2009 No 68): section 20
- Criminal Procedure Act 2011 (2011 No 81): section 413
- Search and Surveillance Act 2012 (2012 No 24): section 323
- Arms (Military Style Semi-automatic Firearms and Import Controls) Amendment Act 2012 (2012 No 117)
- Legislation Act 2012 (2012 No 119): section 77(3)
- Holidays (Full Recognition of Waitangi Day and ANZAC Day) Amendment Act 2013 (2013 No 19): section 8
- Legislation (Confirmable Instruments) Amendment Act 2015 (2015 No 120): section 14
- District Court Act 2016 (2016 No 49): section 261
- Customs and Excise Act 2018 (2018 No 4): section 443(3)
- Family Violence Act 2018 (2018 No 46)
- Arms (Prohibited Firearms, Magazines, and Parts) Amendment Act 2019 (2019 No 12)

=== Previous legislation ===
- Arms Importation Act 1845 (9 Victoriae 1845 No 1)
- Arms Act 1846 (10 Victoriae 1846 No 18)
- Arms Act 1860 (24 Victoriae 1860 No 38)
  - Arms Act Continuance Act 1861 (24 and 25 Victoriae 1861 No 17)
  - Arms Act Continuance Act 1862 (26 Victoriae 1862 No 1)
  - Arms Act Continuance Act 1863 (27 Victoriae 1863 No 2)
  - Arms Act Amendment Act 1869 (32 and 33 Victoriae 1869 No 57)
- Arms Act 1880 (44 VICT 1880 No 13)
- Consolidated Statutes Enactment Act 1908 (8 EDW VII 1908 No 4) - Consolidation and reprint of Arms Act 1880 as the Arms Act 1908 (1908 No 9 in Appendix A)
- Arms Act 1920 (11 GEO V 1920 No 14)
  - Arms Amendment Act 1921 (12 GEO V 1921 No 51)
  - Police Offences Act 1927 (18 GEO V 1927 No 35) section 28
  - Arms Amendment Act 1930 (21 GEO V 1930 No 30)
  - Arms Amendment Act 1934 (25 GEO V 1934 No 3)
  - Summary Proceedings Act 1957 (1957 No 87) - Parts of Third Schedule relating to Police Offences Act 1927 (1927 No 35) section 28
- Arms Act 1958 (1958 No 21)
  - Arms Amendment Act 1962 (1962 No 59)
  - Arms Amendment Act 1964 (1964 No 36)
  - Arms Amendment Act 1966 (1966 No 18)
  - Arms Amendment Act 1968 (1968 No 21)
  - Arms Amendment Act 1971 (1971 No 46)
  - Arms Amendment Act 1974 (1974 No 68)
  - Arms Amendment Act 1976 (1976 No 151)

=== Repeal ===
In late July 2026, the Arms Act 1983 was repealed and replaced by the Arms Act 2026. Most of the new law's changes will come into effect on 23 September 2026, with the remaining provisions expected to come into effect by 23 February 2028.

== Operation of the Act ==
The Act is administered by the New Zealand Police. The full legislative framework of the arms control regime is defined by the Act in conjunction with:

- The Arms (Restricted Weapons and Specially Dangerous Airguns) Order 1984
- The Arms Regulations 1992

The act grants the police considerable discretion in the administration of the arms control regime. Police policy in respect of the arms regime is documented in their Arms Manual 2002.

== Provisions of the Act ==
The act contains provisions for the following:

- the licensing of dealers
- the importation of firearms
- general restrictions on possession of firearms and airguns
- licensing of those using and possessing firearms
- the procurement and carrying of pistols, MSSAs and restricted weapons
- firearms offences
- police powers of search & seizure in respect of firearms

== Inquiries ==
=== Thorp report ===
The Thorp report, or to give the report its formal title: Review of Firearms Control in New Zealand (ISBN 0-477-01796-7), was a Report of an Independent Inquiry Commissioned by the Minister of Police by former judge Thomas Thorp that was commissioned in July 1996 and reported back to the Minister in June 1997. The inquiry was conducted contemporaneously with the official inquiries into the Dunblane massacre in Scotland and the Port Arthur massacre in Australia. The report made 28 broad recommendation statements, with some statements having up to 5 detailed recommendations. Among other things, the report recommended that the 1983 Act be completely rewritten in plain English, that firearms licensing be managed by an independent Firearms Authority, rather than Police, and that limits be placed on the number of firearms a person could own and that licences be specific to only those firearms that were registered against the licence.

=== 2016 Select committee Inquiry ===
In March 2016, Parliament's Law and Order Select Committee announced an Inquiry into issues relating to the illegal possession of firearms in New Zealand. In its final report the committee made 20 recommendations, though the government of the day only accepted 7, Parliament was unable to pass the proposed legislation before the 2017 general election intervened and the bill lapsed because it was not supported by the new government.

=== Arms (Prohibited Firearms, Magazines, and Parts) Amendment Act ===
In response to the Christchurch mosque shootings, the act was amended to ban semi-automatic firearms, magazines, and parts that can be used to assemble prohibited firearms via the Arms (Prohibited Firearms, Magazines, and Parts) Amendment Act 2019, with the support of all parties represented in parliament except the opposition ACT Party.

== See also ==
- Gun laws in New Zealand
- Military-style semi-automatic
- Firearms licence (New Zealand)
