= Arms Legislation Act 2020 =

Act regulating guns in New Zealand

New Zealand Parliament
- Royal assent: 24 June 2020
- Commenced: 25 June 2020

Legislative history
- Introduced by: Stuart Nash
- First reading: 24 September 2019
- Second reading: 19 February 2020
- Third reading: 18 June 2020
- Status: Current legislation

The Arms Legislation Act 2020 is an act by the New Zealand Parliament that established a new regulatory regime to regulate the use and storage of firearms in New Zealand including creating a gun registry. The act passed its first reading on 24 September 2019 with the support of the Labour–led coalition government and its coalition partners New Zealand First and the Greens but was opposed by the opposition National and ACT parties. The act passed its second reading on 19 February 2020 and its third reading on 18 June 2020 and received royal assent on 24 June 2020.

== Legislative features ==
Key provisions of the Arms Legislation Bill include creating a national gun registry; strengthening the licensing regime to filter out "high risk" people and behaviour; creating an advisory group consisting of members of both the firearms and non-firearms communities; strengthening regulation over the importation, distribution, and manufacture of firearms and components; and introducing new offences and penalties. The Bill also amends several existing legislation including the Arms Act 1983, the Extradition Act 1999, the Intelligence and Security Act 2017, and the Mutual Assistance in Criminal Matters Act 1992.

The Bill also reduces firearms licences from ten to five years. It also toughens penalties with people possessing a gun without a licence facing up to one year in prison or a NZ$15,000 fine, and people selling a gun to an unlicensed person facing a two year jail sentence or a $20,000 fine. Short (pistol-length) semi-automatic rifles have also been banned and pest control endorsements also have a shorter duration. People selling ammunition need to possess a firearms licence within six months. There are also new requirements for shooting clubs and ranges after two years.

== History ==
=== Background ===
Following the Christchurch mosque shootings on 15 March 2019, the Labour-led coalition government introduced the Arms (Prohibited Firearms, Magazines, and Parts) Amendment Act 2019, which banned semi-automatic firearms, magazines, and parts. The Bill was supported by all parliamentary parties except the libertarian ACT Party's sole Member of Parliament David Seymour. The Government also introduced a gun buy-back scheme and amnesty.

On 13 September 2019, the Prime Minister Jacinda Ardern and Police Minister Stuart Nash announced that the Government would be introducing a second gun control bill later that month to combat the flow of guns into criminal gangs. The opposition National Party, which had obtained a leaked draft of the bill in August, and gun lobby groups claimed that the bill would unfairly target firearm owners and gun clubs.

=== First reading ===
On 23 September 2019, the National Party's police spokesperson Brett Hudson requested thirteen changes for the proposed gun bill including introducing firearms prohibition orders, introducing safeguards on health professionals reporting patients to the New Zealand Police, and providing flexibility for gun clubs, shooting rangers, and pest controllers. That same day, the Arms Legislation Bill passed its first reading. While the Labour, Green, and New Zealand First parties supported the bill, it was opposed by the National and ACT parties.

=== Second reading ===
On 19 February 2020, the Arms Legislation Bill passed its second reading by a margin of 63 to 57 votes. Labour, the Greens, and NZ First supported the bill while National, ACT, and independent MP Jami-Lee Ross opposed the bill. National MP Hudson attempted to introduce seven amendments that included removing the proposed gun register, exemptions and changes to the "fit and proper person test" relating to violent, hate speech, and extremism. ACT MP David Seymour also proposed amendments eliminating the gun register, new regulations on shooting clubs, and a provision for doctors to report on "dangerous" patients. These amendments were not accepted. In addition, the Council of Licensed Firearm Owners (COLFO) tried unsuccessfully to lobby NZ First into reversing their support for the bill.

=== Third reading ===
On 18 June 2020, the Arms Legislation Bill passed its third reading by a margin of 63 to 50 votes. Labour, the Greens, and NZ First supported the bill while National, ACT, and Independent MP Jami-Lee Ross opposed the bill. Only 48 National MPs voted since the others were absent due to COVID-19 flight disruptions. In return for support the bill's passage into law, Labour agreed to incorporate New Zealand First's proposal that an independent entity be established to take over firearms licensing and administration from the Police. In addition, the Bill also allowed members of the farming community, owners and managers of agricultural businesses to apply for endorsements to use prohibited firearms for pest control without having to establish a company to carry out the work. The opposition National and ACT parties, and the Council of Licensed Firearms Owners (COLFO) criticised the bill for allegedly penalising law-abiding gun owners. By contrast, the New Zealand Police Association supported the bill, saying that changes were long overdue.

=== Royal assent ===
The bill received royal assent on 24 June 2020 and commenced on 25 June 2020.

=== Proposed amendment ===
In May 2024, the Sixth National Government introduced legislation to amend Part 6 of the Arms Legislation Act, which requires oversight and regulation of shooting clubs and ranges. Public consultation on the legislation commenced on 28 May and concluded on 21 June. The New Zealand Police Association, Federation of Islamic Associations of New Zealand, Gun Control New Zealand, and the opposition Labour Party criticised the Government for the short timeframe for public consultation and giving priority to select groups. In response to criticism, Associate Justice Minister Nicole McKee denied that the short consultation process was "non-democratic" and said that "the changes were needed quickly to help club ranges and owners struggling with “burdensome” and “confusing” regulation."

On 12 August 2024, the NZ Police Association's president Chris Cahill called for McKee to be removed from the firearms reform portfolio due to the union's exclusion from the consultation process for the amendment to the Arms Legislation Act. He also accused McKee of being a gun lobbyist. In response to Cahill's criticism, McKee defended the consultation process and said that Police had been consulted.
