= Dignitary Protection Service =

The Dignitary Protection Service (DPS), previously the Diplomatic Protection Service, is a branch of the New Zealand Police that provides personal security for both national and visiting diplomats and VIPs. National VIPs that receive constant protection are the prime minister and the governor-general, while ministers, members of Parliament, the judiciary and the leader of the Opposition receive protection as needed. Protection is provided both in New Zealand and abroad. Previous visiting VIPs afforded DPS protection have included Tiger Woods during the 2002 New Zealand Open, and FBI Director Robert Mueller. The DPS also patrols foreign embassies, consulates and high commissions.

== History ==
The New Zealand Police established the DPS in the mid-1970s, to meet New Zealand's obligations under the Vienna Convention on Diplomatic Relations and Consular Relations.

== Organization ==
The squad is based in the capital Wellington, where the majority of foreign diplomatic missions are. Officers are experienced members of the New Zealand Police, who pass the DPS course at the Royal New Zealand Police College. The course has training on topics such as diplomatic immunity and unarmed combat. Squad members usually operate in plain clothes, and all genders can be squad members.

== Equipment ==
The DPS routinely carry firearms, in contrast to the regular police which generally do not. A 1993 report for the U.S. World Factbook of Criminal Justice Systems stated DPS officers have access to semi-automatic pistols.

The current DPS fleet mainly consists of unmarked Toyota Highlanders and previously used the Holden Captiva SUV, which replaced the unmarked Holden sedans in use at the time.

== Operations ==
- 30 June 2000 - Squad members stand guard inside the Turkish consulate in Auckland, following Kurdish protests at the arrest of Abdullah Öcalan.
- September 2001 - Following the September 11 attacks, members of the DPS, Armed Offenders Squad and the Special Tactics Group were involved in operations for two months at the Embassy of the United States in Wellington. It was the first time armed New Zealand police conducted operations at the U.S. Embassy.
- 2002 - Operation Links, 400 police, including members of the DPS, protected players including Tiger Woods during the New Zealand Open.

== Incidents ==
When the prime minister travels by road the DPS normally have a vehicle following behind, closer than is generally safe to prevent other vehicles getting in between. The close proximity of the escort vehicle has caused a few minor nose-to-tail accidents, such as twice in six weeks during 2000, on 9 December 2005 when Deputy Prime Minister Michael Cullen's Crown car was rear ended and on 27 November 2024 when Prime Minister Christopher Luxon's Crown Car was also rear ended.

- c. 1993 – A DPS officer accidentally discharged a firearm into a briefcase aboard a foreign VIP aircraft, on the ground in Christchurch. Police stated, "The bullet lodged in the battery pack of a police radio in the briefcase."
- 2000 – Prime Minister Helen Clark criticised the DPS handling of a state visit by Chinese President Jiang Zemin the previous year – the DPS sought to minimise the president's exposure to protesters and save the government any embarrassment, which Clark rebuked by saying it was not in the spirit of democracy.
- 17 July 2004 – Helen Clark's motorcade travels at speeds of up to 172 km/h, to catch a flight at Christchurch after a flight from Timaru was cancelled. The Timaru District Court acquitted a DPS officer of all six charges relating to dangerous driving, and the Independent Police Conduct Authority praised a subsequent review of the Dignitary Protection Squad standard operating procedures and urgent duty driving.
- 13 April 2005 – A door blew open on a six-seater charter airplane carrying Prime Minister Helen Clark. DPS officers Constable John Burridge and Senior Constable Dave Reid spent fifteen minutes holding the door closed with the aid of a baton, until the plane landed safely. Both officers later received Police silver merit awards for their actions.
- August 2007 – The DPS are involved in shutting down a boy racer website that contained death threats against MP Clayton Cosgrove.
- 2007 – Two breaches lead to a review of security at Helen Clark's Mount Eden home, after taggers were able to put graffiti on the house, and a man who had robbed a dairy was able to hide in the garden while changing his clothes.
- November 2008 – New Prime Minister John Key's property in Parnell, Auckland caused some security problems for the DPS due to the large size (2,340 m^{2}), and the pricing and availability of accommodation for officers.
- February 2009 – On Waitangi Day, Prime Minister John Key is manhandled by a protester as he walks towards a marae after getting out of his car. The incident caused speculation about the efficiency of the DPS.
- June 2016 - A DPS officer accidentally left their firearm in a publicly accessible bathroom in parliament. The DPS officer was heading to Wellington Airport only realising their mistake once they arrived. The DPS officer asked a colleague to return to parliament to retrieve the firearm. The colleague arrived just after a member of the public found the firearm. The firearm was secured by the colleague after being left unattended for almost an hour and a half.
- December 2017 – Newly appointed Prime Minister Jacinda Ardern's Auckland property caused some security issues due to the small size of the property and because no close proximity accommodation has been sought yet, so the DPS rotated sittings in unmarked vehicles.

== See also ==
- Parliamentary and Diplomatic Protection, a British agency providing protection to foreign diplomats and heads of state visiting the UK
