= Arms (Prohibited Firearms, Magazines, and Parts) Amendment Act 2019 =

New Zealand gun control law

New Zealand Parliament
- Citation: 2019 No. 12
- Royal assent: 10 April 2019
- Commenced: 12 April 2019

Legislative history
- Introduced by: Stuart Nash
- First reading: 2 April 2019
- Second reading: 9 April 2019
- Third reading: 10 April 2019
- Status: Current legislation

The Arms (Prohibited Firearms, Magazines, and Parts) Amendment Act 2019 is an act of the New Zealand Parliament that amends the Arms Act 1983 to ban semi-automatic firearms, large capacity magazines, and parts that can be used to assemble prohibited firearms. It was introduced by Labour Cabinet Minister and Member of Parliament Stuart Nash in response to the Christchurch mosque shootings. The Bill passed its third and final reading on 10 April 2019, receiving royal assent the following day. The Arms Amendment Bill was supported by all parties represented in Parliament except the opposition ACT Party.

== Legislation features ==
=== Key aims ===
The Arms (Prohibited Firearms, Magazines, and Parts) Amendment Act 2019 seeks to remove semi-automatic firearms from public circulation by banning semi-automatic firearms, magazines, and parts that can be used to assemble prohibited firearms. The Act extends the ban on military style semi-automatics (MSSAs) to include most semi-automatic firearms and some shotguns. Some small-calibre rimfire semi-automatic firearms and lesser-capacity shotguns are excluded from the prohibition. These excluded firearms have a limited magazine capacity and are commonly used for farming, hunting, and recreational purposes.

=== Proscribed items ===
Firearms and related devices prohibited under the Act include:

- Semi-automatic firearms, except for (provided that they are otherwise not prohibited):
  - Pistols
  - Firearms designed to discharge rimfire cartridges of .22 calibre or less
  - Shotguns with a non-detachable tubular magazine that can hold 5 cartridges or less
- Pump-action shotguns which:
  - Are capable of being used with a detachable magazine, or
  - Have a non-detachable tubular magazine or magazines that can hold more than 5 cartridges
- Magazines for shotguns that can hold more than 5 cartridges
- Any magazine which can hold more than 10 cartridges
- Parts of a prohibited firearm, including a component, that can be applied to enable, or take significant steps towards enabling, a firearm to be fired with, or near, a semi-automatic action.

=== Other provisions ===
The Act provides exemptions to import, sell, supply, and possess semi-automatic firearms for licensed dealers, employees of the Department of Conservation, people engaged in pest control, bona fide firearms collectors, directors or curators of bona fide museums, approved broadcasters, and bona fide theatre companies or societies, or film or television production companies. The Act offers an amnesty for prohibited firearms, magazines, and parts to be surrendered to licensed dealers and the New Zealand Police by 30 September 2019, later extended to 20 December 2019. The Act also introduces several new offenses and penalties ranging from two to ten years for various offenses including unlawful possession of prohibited firearms, magazines, and parts; importing prohibited items without a permit; carrying a prohibited item with criminal intent; and knowingly supplying or selling prohibited weapons and parts.

== History ==
=== Background ===
Following the Christchurch mosque shootings on 15 March 2019, Prime Minister Jacinda Ardern announced that the government would be changing New Zealand's gun laws. Attorney-General David Parker was later quoted as saying that the government would ban semi-automatic guns, but subsequently backtracked, saying that the government had not yet committed to anything and that regulations around semi-automatic weapons was "one of the issues" the government would consider. On 20 March 2019, Ardern announced that the government would ban all semi-automatic firearms and assault rifles and would also be introducing a buy-back scheme to remove all prohibited firearms from circulation. On 21 March, as an interim step, the government reclassified most semi-automatic firearms as "military style semi-automatic firearms" for the purpose of the Arms Act 1983, pursuant to section 74A(c) of the statute.

=== First reading ===
On 1 April 2019, Minister of Police Stuart Nash introduced the Arms Amendment Bill into parliament. The next day, leader of the House Chris Hipkins sought leave of the House for the bill to proceed more quickly than allowed by standing orders. Leave is denied if any member objects, and the opposition ACT Party's sole MP David Seymour had said he would object. However, Seymour was outside the House speaking to journalists when Hipkins sought leave and so was unable to object, and leave was granted. This meant the bill could be passed quickly, without needing to be under urgency. It passed its first reading that day, with only Seymour voting against it, and was referred to the Finance and Expenditure select committee.

=== Select committee stage ===
On 3 April, the government announced that it would be holding submissions on the Arms Amendment Bill until 6pm on 4 April 2019. Gun owners, including the Council of Licensed Firearms Owners chairman Paul Clark, Guns NZ chief executive Jim Yates, and Deerstalkers Association spokesperson Bill O'Leary, criticised the short submission time frame on the proposed law change. By the evening of 3 April, MPs had received thousands of submissions relating to the gun law.

On 8 April, the Finance and Expenditure Select Committee recommended some minor changes to the Arms Amendment Bill including allowing pest controllers to use semi-automatic arms on private lands and allowing people to keep heirloom weapons. However, the committee rejected calls to exempt competitive shooters from the ban because that would allow more semi-automatic firearms to remain in circulation. In total, the committee received 13,062 submissions and 22 oral submissions: 60% supported the bill, 26% opposed the bill, while 14% expressed another opinion. The Act Party and the New Zealand Law Society both criticised the rapid passage of the legislation.

=== Second and third readings ===
On 9 April, the Gun Amendment Bill passed its second reading. The following day, the bill passed its third reading. The bill was supported by all parliamentary parties except the ACT Party's sole MP Seymour. Opposition National MP Judith Collins reiterated the National Party's support for the bill despite the party's failure to secure Firearms Prohibition Orders and an exemption in the bill for competitive shooting.

In addition, the government announced a buyback scheme for prohibited firearms. Independent advisers will come up with a price list for the buyback scheme while a separate expert panel will determine fair compensation for high value firearms. Police Minister Stuart Nash has indicated that the buyback scheme could cost NZ$1 billion. The government included an out clause that it will not be compensating people who had obtained their arms illegally, but clarified that they would still be covered by the amnesty timeframe. ACT MP Seymour has called on the government to compensate gang members in order to convince them to surrender their arms. Nash announced that the Cabinet would consider the scheme's regulations and extending the amnesty by a month.

On Thursday, 11 April 2019, the Governor-General of New Zealand, Patsy Reddy, signed the bill, officially enacting it into law, going into effect on 12 April 2019.

=== Aftermath ===
On 20 June, Finance Minister Robertson and Police Minister Nash launched the Government's six-month firearms buy-back amnesty, which would run until 20 December. The Government allocated NZ$200 million to the firearms buy-back scheme. Licensed firearms owners will be eligible for the scheme. There are four collection options for the government's buy-back scheme: large-scale events at centralised community locations; handing over items at approved gun dealers; bulk pickups by Police; and at Police stations. The New Zealand Police has organised a series of nationwide local collection events for gun owners to hand in prohibited firearms. By 22 July, over 2,000 guns had been handed in at buyback events in Auckland and Wellington over the past weekend.

On 13 September 2019, Prime Minister Ardern and Police Minister Nash announced that the Government would be introducing an Arms Legislation Bill which would create a firearms register in order to stop the flow of guns to criminal groups. The bill was criticised by the opposition National Party and gun lobby groups, who claim it would punish lawful firearm owners and gun clubs. According to Al Jazeera and Reuters, more than 19,100 firearms and 70,800 gun accessories have been surrendered to the gun amnesty as of mid-September 2019. According to the Small Arms Survey, New Zealand is the 17th highest ranking country in terms of civilian gun ownership with a population of under 5 million and an estimated 1.5 million firearms. The buyback ended on 20 December 2019. During the buyback period, 56,250 firearms and 194,245 parts were surrendered to police, and 2,717 firearms were modified to meet the new legal standards.
