= Opinion polling for the 2020 New Zealand general election =

Several polling firms conducted opinion polls during the term of the 52nd New Zealand Parliament in the lead up to the 2020 general election, which elects the 53rd Parliament. The 52nd Parliament was elected on 23 September 2017 and dissolved on 6 September 2020. The 2020 election was originally due to take place on Saturday 19 September 2020, but due to a second COVID-19 outbreak it was delayed until Saturday 17 October 2020.

Very few polls have been conducted compared to previous electoral cycles. The two regular polls are Television New Zealand (1News), conducted by Colmar Brunton, and MediaWorks New Zealand (Newshub) Reid Research, with less frequent polls from Roy Morgan Research. The sample size, margin of error and confidence interval of each poll varies by organisation and date.

== Party vote ==
=== Graphical summary ===
The first graph shows trend lines averaged across all polls for all political parties that are routinely included by polling companies. The second graph shows parties that received less than 10% of the party vote in the 2017 election, and are routinely included by polling companies.

Summary of poll results given below from the election result 23 September 2017. Lines give the mean estimated by a LOESS smoother (smoothing set to span = 0.625). Left and right-hand axis markers indicate the actual poll results from the 2017 and 2020 elections respectively.

Summary of poll results for parties that received less than 10% of the party vote in the 2017 election, and that are routinely included by polling companies. Lines give the mean estimated by a LOESS smoother (smoothing set to span = 0.625). Left and right-hand axis markers indicate the actual poll results from the 2017 and 2020 elections respectively.

=== Individual polls ===
Poll results are listed in the table below in reverse chronological order. The highest percentage figure in each polling survey is displayed in bold, and the background shaded in the leading party's colour. The 'party lead' column shows the percentage-point difference between the two parties with the highest figures. In the instance of a tie, both figures are shaded and displayed in bold. Percentages may not add to 100 percent due to polls not reporting figures for all minor parties and due to rounding. Refusals are generally excluded from the party vote percentages, while question wording and the treatment of "don't know" responses and those not intending to vote may vary between survey organisations.

The parties shown in the table are National (NAT), Labour (LAB), New Zealand First (NZF), Green (GRN), ACT, Opportunities (TOP), Māori (MRI), New Conservative (NCP) and Advance New Zealand (ANZ). Other parties have also registered in some polls, but are not listed in this table.

Date (Note: These are the survey dates of the poll, or if the survey dates are not stated, the date the poll was released.)	Polling organisation	Sample size	NAT	LAB	NZF	GRN	ACT	TOP	MRI	NCP	ANZ	Lead
**17 Oct 2020**	**2020 election result**	N/A	25.6	**50.0**	2.6	7.9	7.6	1.5	1.2	1.5	1.0	24.4
**8–15 Oct 2020**	Newshub–Reid Research	1000	31.1	**45.8**	3.5	6.3	7.4	1.3	0.6	1.7	0.3	14.7
**10–14 Oct 2020**	1 News–Colmar Brunton	1005	31	**46**	2.6	8	8	1.1	0.6	1.5	0.9	15
**3–7 Oct 2020**	1 News–Colmar Brunton	1007	32	**47**	2.4	6	8	1.8	0.2	1.3	0.9	15
**3 Oct 2020**	**Advance voting for the election begins. The Electoral Commission estimates 60% of voters will cast their vote before election day.**											
**Sep 2020**	Roy Morgan Research	911	28.5	**47.5**	2.5	9.5	7.0	1.5	0.5	–	–	19
**23–27 Sep 2020**	1 News–Colmar Brunton	1005	33	**47**	1.4	7	8	1.0	0.8	1.4	0.6	14
**16–23 Sep 2020**	Newshub–Reid Research	1000	29.6	**50.1**	1.9	6.5	6.3	0.9	1.5	2.1	–	20.5
**17–21 Sep 2020**	1 News–Colmar Brunton	1008	31	**48**	2.4	6	7	1.1	0.9	1.6	0.8	17
**Aug 2020**	Roy Morgan Research	897	28.5	**48.0**	2.5	11.5	6.0	1.0	0.5	–	–	19.5
**17 Aug 2020**	**Jacinda Ardern announces the election is postponed to 17 October 2020, over concerns relating to a recent rise in cases of COVID-19.**											
**Jul 2020**	Roy Morgan Research	899	26.5	**53.5**	1.5	8	6.5	1.5	0.5	–	N/A	27
**25–29 Jul 2020**	1 News–Colmar Brunton	1004	32	**53**	2	5	4.8	0.1	1	1.2	N/A	21
**16–24 Jul 2020**	Newshub–Reid Research	1000	25.1	**60.9**	2.0	5.7	3.3	0.4	0.4	0.9	N/A	35.8
**14 Jul 2020**	**Todd Muller resigns and Judith Collins is elected as leader of the National Party.**											
**Jun 2020**	Roy Morgan Research	879	27	**54.5**	1.5	9	5	1.5	1	–	N/A	27.5
**20–24 Jun 2020**	1 News–Colmar Brunton	1007	38	**50**	1.8	6	3.1	0.5	0.9	0.7	N/A	12
**27 Apr – 24 May 2020**	Roy Morgan Research	894	26.5	**56.5**	2.5	7	3.5	1	1.5	–	N/A	30
**22 May 2020**	**Todd Muller is elected leader of the National Party, replacing Simon Bridges.**											
**16–20 May 2020**	1 News–Colmar Brunton	1003	29	**59**	2.9	4.7	2.2	0.5	1.2	0.4	N/A	30
**8–16 May 2020**	Newshub–Reid Research	1000	30.6	**56.5**	2.7	5.5	1.8	0.1	0.9	1.0	N/A	25.9
**14 May 2020**	**2020 Budget is delivered.**											
**Apr 2020**	Roy Morgan Research	–	30.5	**55**	2.5	7	2.5	–	–	–	N/A	24.5
**Mar 2020**	Roy Morgan Research	–	37	**42.5**	3	11.5	3.5	–	–	–	N/A	5.5
**25 Mar 2020**	**Nationwide Level 4 restrictions are implemented due to the COVID-19 pandemic.**											
**Feb 2020**	Roy Morgan Research	–	37	**40.5**	5	10.5	3.5	–	–	–	N/A	3.5
**8–12 Feb 2020**	1 News–Colmar Brunton	1004	**46**	41	3.3	5	1.7	0.1	1.1	0.8	N/A	5
**23 Jan – 1 Feb 2020**	Newshub–Reid Research	1000	**43.3**	42.5	3.6	5.6	1.8	0.6	0.9	0.7	N/A	0.8
**Jan 2020**	Roy Morgan Research	–	**40**	**40**	2.5	10.5	3	–	–	–	N/A	Tie
**28 Jan 2020**	**Prime Minister Jacinda Ardern announces that the election will take place on 19 September 2020.**											
**23–27 Nov 2019**	1 News–Colmar Brunton	1006	**46**	39	4.3	7	1.6	0.9	0.5	0.8	N/A	7
**7–11 Nov 2019**	Stuff–YouGov	1005	38	**41**	8	8	2	1	1	–	N/A	3
**5–9 Oct 2019**	1 News–Colmar Brunton	1008	**47**	40	4.2	7	0.9	0.5	0.8	0.4	N/A	7
**2–9 Oct 2019**	Newshub–Reid Research	1000	**43.9**	41.6	4.0	6.3	1.4	1.1	0.7	1	N/A	2.3
**20–24 Jul 2019**	1 News–Colmar Brunton	1003	**45**	43	3.3	6	1	0.5	1.1	0.8	N/A	2
**4–8 Jun 2019**	1 News–Colmar Brunton	1002	**44**	42	5	6	0.7	0.5	0.5	0.6	N/A	2
**30 May – 7 Jun 2019**	Newshub–Reid Research	1000	37.4	**50.8**	2.8	6.2	0.8	0.1	0.5	1	N/A	13.4
**30 May 2019**	**The 2019 Budget is delivered.**											
**6–10 Apr 2019**	1 News–Colmar Brunton	1009	40	**48**	4.3	6	0.7	–	0.5	0.4	N/A	8
**15–23 Mar 2019**	Business NZ–Reid Research	1000	41.3	**49.6**	2.3	3.9	–	–	–	–	N/A	8.3
**15 Mar 2019**	**Christchurch shootings targeting mosques kill 51 people and injure a further 49. Terror threat level is raised from low to high.**											
**9–13 Feb 2019**	1 News–Colmar Brunton	1006	42	**45**	3	6	0.9	0.6	1.4	0.2	N/A	3
**24 Jan – 2 Feb 2019**	Newshub–Reid Research	1000	41.6	**47.5**	2.9	5.1	0.4	0.5	0.8	1.1	N/A	5.9
**24–28 Nov 2018**	1 News–Colmar Brunton	1008	**46**	43	4	5	0.6	0.3	0.9	–	N/A	3
**15–19 Oct 2018**	1 News–Colmar Brunton	1006	43	**45**	5	7	0.3	0.3	0.6	0.3	N/A	2
**2 Aug 2018**	**Ardern returns as Prime Minister after six weeks of maternity leave.**											
**28 Jul – 1 Aug 2018**	1 News–Colmar Brunton	1007	**45**	42	5	6	1.1	0.4	0.9	0.1	N/A	3
**21 Jun 2018**	**Ardern gives birth. Winston Peters becomes Acting Prime Minister.**											
**17–24 May 2018**	Newshub–Reid Research	1000	**45.1**	42.6	2.4	5.7	0.2	1.6	0.9	1.1	N/A	2.5
**19–23 May 2018**	1 News–Colmar Brunton	1007	**45**	43	4.2	5	0.7	0.5	0.9	0.2	N/A	2
**17 May 2018**	**The 2018 Budget is delivered.**											
**7–11 Apr 2018**	1 News–Colmar Brunton	1007	**44**	43	5	6	0.3	0.4	1.2	0.2	N/A	1
**8 Apr 2018**	**Marama Davidson is elected co-leader of the Green Party.**											
**27 Feb 2018**	**Simon Bridges is elected leader of the National Party.**											
**10–14 Feb 2018** (Note: 75% of respondents were polled before Bill English announced his resignation.)	1 News–Colmar Brunton	1007	43	**48**	2.6	5	0.5	0.6	0.7	0.1	N/A	5
**13 Feb 2018**	**Bill English announces he will stand down as National leader and resign from Parliament.**											
**18–28 Jan 2018**	Newshub–Reid Research	1000	**44.5**	42.3	3.8	6	0.2	1.4	0.8	0.3	N/A	2.2
**2–28 Jan 2018**	Roy Morgan Research	1000	39	**42.5**	6	9	0.5	1.5	1	–	N/A	3.5
**27 Nov – 10 Dec 2017**	Roy Morgan Research	–	**40.5**	37	8	10	0.5	–	–	–	N/A	3.5
**29 Nov – 5 Dec 2017**	1 News–Colmar Brunton	1007	**46**	39	5	7	0.1	1.2	0.9	–	N/A	7
**30 Oct – 12 Nov 2017**	Roy Morgan Research	887	**40.5**	39.5	5	10	0.5	2	1.5	–	N/A	1
**26 Oct 2017**	**Jacinda Ardern is sworn in as Prime Minister of New Zealand.**											
**2–15 Oct 2017**	Roy Morgan Research	894	**46**	31	6.5	11	0.5	2	1.5	–	N/A	15
**23 Sep 2017**	**2017 election result**	N/A	**44.4**	36.9	7.2	6.3	0.5	2.4	1.2	0.2	N/A	7.6
Date	Polling organisation	Sample size	NAT	LAB	NZF	GRN	ACT	TOP	MRI	NCP	ANZ	Lead

=== UMR and Curia polls ===
These polls are typically unpublished and are used internally for Labour (UMR) and National (Curia). Although these polls are sometimes leaked or partially leaked, their details are not publicly available for viewing and scrutinising. Because not all of their polls are made public, it is likely that those that are released are cherry-picked and therefore may not truly indicate ongoing trends.

Date	Polling organisation	NAT	LAB	NZF	GRN	ACT	Lead
13 Oct 2020	UMR Research	29	**50**	2.7	6	7	21
25 Aug – 2 Sep 2020	UMR Research	29	**53**	3.9	3.2	6.2	24
12 Aug 2020	UMR Research	28	**52**	5.1	5.4	5.9	24
28 Jul 2020	Curia	36	**47**	3	6	3	11
30 Jun 2020	Curia	34	**55**	–	–	–	21
26 May – 1 Jun 2020	UMR Research	30	**54**	5	4	–	24
21–27 April 2020	UMR Research	29	**55**	6	5	3	26
14 April 2020	Curia	31	**49**	6	9	5	18
8 April 2020	UMR Research	35	**49**	5	5	2	14
17 Feb 2020	UMR Research	38	**42**	6	9	3	4
2 Feb 2020	Curia	39	**41**	7	7	2	2
23 Jul 2019	UMR Research	38	**42**	–	9	–	4
9 Nov 2018	UMR Research	37	**46**	–	–	–	9
23 Sep 2017	**2017 election result**	**44.4**	36.9	7.2	6.3	0.5	7.5

== Preferred prime minister ==
Some opinion pollsters ask voters who they would prefer as prime minister. The phrasing of questions and the treatment of refusals, as well as "don't know" answers, differ from poll to poll.

Graph of preferred prime minister polling before the 2020 election. Only includes people who polled above 1% at least once. Smoothing is set to span 45%.

Date	Polling organisation	Sample size	Jacinda Ardern	Judith Collins	Winston Peters	James Shaw	Marama Davidson	David Seymour	Leighton Baker	Billy Te Kahika	Todd Muller	Simon Bridges	Bill English	Lead
8–15 Oct 2020	Newshub–Reid Research	1,000	52.6	18.4	–	–	–	–	–	–	–	–	–	34.2
10–14 Oct 2020	1 News–Colmar Brunton	1,005	55	20	1	0.4	0.1	3	0.4	0.4	–	0.4	–	35
3–7 Oct 2020	1 News–Colmar Brunton	1,007	50	23	1	0.1	0.5	2	0.1	0.2	0.1	0.2	0.2	27
23–27 Sep 2020	1 News–Colmar Brunton	1,005	54	23	1	0.1	0.2	2	0.1	0.4	–	0.1	0.1	31
16–23 Sep 2020	Newshub–Reid Research	1,000	53.2	17.7	–	–	–	–	–	–	–	–	–	35.5
17–21 Sep 2020	1 News–Colmar Brunton	1,008	54	18	2	0.1	–	2	0.3	0.2	–	0.1	0.3	36
25–29 Jul 2020	1 News–Colmar Brunton	1,004	54	20	1	0.1	0.1	1	0.1	0.7	0.2	–	–	34
16–24 Jul 2020	Newshub–Reid Research	1,000	62	14.6	–	–	–	–	–	–	–	–	–	47.4
14 Jul 2020	Todd Muller resigns and Judith Collins is elected as leader of the National Party.													
20–24 Jun 2020	1 News–Colmar Brunton	1,007	54	2	2	0.1	0.1	0.8	0.1	–	13	0.4	0.2	41
26 May – 1 Jun 2020	UMR Research	–	65	–	–	–	–	–	–	–	13	–	–	52
22 May 2020	Todd Muller is elected leader of the National Party.													
16–20 May 2020	1 News–Colmar Brunton	1,003	63	3	1	0.1	0.1	0.4	0.3	–	0.2	5	0.1	58
8–16 May 2020	Newshub–Reid Research	1,000	59.5	3.1	–	–	–	–	–	–	–	4.5	–	51
21–27 Apr 2020	UMR Research	–	65	7	3	–	–	–	–	–	–	7	–	58
8–12 Feb 2020	1 News–Colmar Brunton	1,004	42	3	3	0.1	0.5	0.8	–	–	–	11	0.2	31
23 Jan – 1 Feb 2020	Newshub–Reid Research	1,000	38.7	–	–	–	–	–	–	–	–	10.6	–	28.1
23–27 Nov 2019	1 News–Colmar Brunton	1,006	36	4	3	0.3	–	0.6	–	–	–	10	–	26
5–9 Oct 2019	1 News–Colmar Brunton	1,008	38	5	4	0.3	0.3	0.4	–	–	0.2	9	0.1	29
2–9 Oct 2019	Newshub–Reid Research	1,000	38.4	5.2	–	–	–	–	–	–	–	6.7	–	31.7
20–24 Jul 2019	1 News–Colmar Brunton	1,003	41	6	2	–	0.1	0.4	–	–	0.1	6	0.2	35
4–8 Jun 2019	1 News–Colmar Brunton	1,002	45	6	5	0.1	–	0.5	–	–	–	5	0.1	39
30 May – 7 Jun 2019	Newshub–Reid Research	1,000	49	7.1	–	–	–	–	–	–	–	4.2	–	41.9
6–10 Apr 2019	1 News–Colmar Brunton	1,006	51	5	3	0.2	–	0.2	–	–	–	5	0.3	46
9–13 Feb 2019	1 News–Colmar Brunton	1,006	44	6	3	0.2	–	0.1	–	–	–	6	0.4	38
24 Jan – 2 Feb 2019	Newshub–Reid Research	1,000	41.8	6.2	–	–	–	–	–	–	–	5.0	–	35.6
24–28 Nov 2018	1 News–Colmar Brunton	1,008	39	6	4	0.1	–	0.1	–	–	–	7	0.4	32
15–19 Oct 2018	1 News–Colmar Brunton	1,006	42	5	4	0.1	0.1	–	–	–	–	7	1	35
2 Aug 2018	Jacinda Ardern returns as Prime Minister after six weeks of maternity leave.													
28 Jul – 1 Aug 2018	1 News–Colmar Brunton	1,007	40	2	5	0.3	0.3	0.2	–	–	–	10	0.9	30
21 Jun 2018	Prime Minister Jacinda Ardern gives birth. Winston Peters becomes Acting Prime Minister.													
17–24 May 2018	Newshub–Reid Research	1,000	40.2	3.7	4.6	–	–	–	–	–	–	9	4.2	31.2
19–23 May 2018	1 News–Colmar Brunton	1,007	41	2	4	0.2	–	0.1	–	–	–	12	0.9	29
7–11 Apr 2018	1 News–Colmar Brunton	1,007	37	2	5	–	–	0.3	–	–	–	10	2	27
8 Apr 2018	Marama Davidson is elected co-leader of the Green Party.													
27 Feb 2018	Simon Bridges is elected leader of the National Party.													
10–14 Feb 2018	1 News–Colmar Brunton	1,007	41	0.4	4	0.4	–	0.1	–	–	–	1	20	21
18–28 Jan 2018	Newshub–Reid Research	1,000	37.9	0.2	5.7	0.1	–	–	–	–	–	0.5	25.7	12.2
29 Nov – 5 Dec 2017	1 News–Colmar Brunton	1,007	37	0.7	5	0.4	–	–	–	–	–	0.3	28	9

== Government approval rating ==
Government approval rating prior to the 2020 election. No polling was conducted in 2018 or 2019. View source data.

Date	Polling organisation	Sample size	Right direction	Wrong direction	Do not know	Lead
Sep 2020	Roy Morgan Research	911	70.5	19.5	10	51
Aug 2020	Roy Morgan Research	897	71	19	10	52
Jul 2020	Roy Morgan Research	899	71.5	19	9.5	52.5
Jun 2020	Roy Morgan Research	879	72	18.5	9.5	53.5
May 2020	Roy Morgan Research	900	76	17.5	6.5	58.5
Apr 2020	Roy Morgan Research	900	77	14	9	63
Mar 2020	Roy Morgan Research	900	60.5	25.5	14	35
Feb 2020	Roy Morgan Research	900	59	27	14	32
Jan 2020	Roy Morgan Research	900	66.5	20	12.5	46.5
27 Nov – 10 Dec 2017	Roy Morgan Research		68	18	14	50
29 Nov – 5 Dec 2017	1 News–Colmar Brunton	1,007	51	26	23	25
30 Oct – 12 Nov 2017	Roy Morgan Research	887	66.5	20	13.5	46.5
24 Oct – 1 Nov 2017	Horizon Research	1,068	49	24	28	21
2–15 Oct 2017	Roy Morgan Research	894	58.5	27.5	14	31

== Electorate polling ==
=== Auckland Central ===
Electorate vote
Date	Polling organisation	LAB	NAT		GRN		NZF		TOP		ACT		SNZ	TEA	IND
Date	Polling organisation	Helen White	Emma Mellow	Nikki Kaye	Chlöe Swarbrick	Denise Roche	Jenny Marcroft	Frank Edwards	Tuariki Delamere	Mika Haka	Felix Poole	Brooke van Velden	Vernon Tava	Dominic Hoffman Dervan	Joshua Love
24–30 Sep 2020	Q+A Colmar Brunton	35	30	N/A	26	N/A	1	N/A	—	N/A	4	N/A	2	1	0.4
September 2020	Newshub Nation–Reid Research	42.3	26.6	N/A	24.2	N/A	2.2	N/A	1.0	N/A	0.9	N/A	—	—	—
23 Sep 2017	2017 election result	39.82	N/A	45.25	N/A	9.72	N/A	1.98	N/A	2.33	N/A	0.52	N/A	N/A	N/A

Party vote
Date	Polling organisation	LAB	NAT	GRN	ACT	NZF	TOP	SNZ	VNZ	SCP
24–30 Sep 2020	Q+A Colmar Brunton	47	28	13	6	1.7	2.2	0.6	0.4	0.3
September 2020	Newshub Nation–Reid Research	56.2	23.1	12.1	3.9	1.6	1.4	—	—	—
23 Sep 2017	2017 election result	37.71	39.15	13.87	1.05	3.87	3.14	N/A	N/A	0.01

=== East Coast ===
Electorate vote
Date	Polling organisation	LAB	NAT		GRN	
Date	Polling organisation	Kiri Allan	Tania Tapsell	Anne Tolley	Meredith Akuhata-Brown	Gareth Hughes
22–24 Sep 2020	Community Engagement	40.5	35	N/A	4.9	N/A
23 Sep 2017	2017 election result	33.51	N/A	46.18	N/A	7.13

Party vote
Date	Polling organisation	LAB	NAT	GRN	NZF
22–24 Sep 2020	Community Engagement	50	31	4.4	4.2
23 Sep 2017	2017 election result	36.62	44.03	4.58	9.89

=== Northland ===
Electorate vote
Date	Polling organisation	NAT	LAB	NZF		GRN		NCP	ACT	
Date	Polling organisation	Matt King	Willow-Jean Prime	Shane Jones	Winston Peters	Darleen Tana Hoff-Nielsen	Peter Hughes	Mel Taylor	Mark Cameron	Craig Nelson
29 Jul – 4 Aug 2020	Q+A–Colmar Brunton	46	31	15	N/A	3	N/A	2	1	N/A
23 Sep 2017	2017 election result	38.30	21.61	N/A	34.81	N/A	4.51	0.46	N/A	0.30

Party vote
Date	Polling organisation	LAB	NAT	ACT	NZF	GRN	TOP
29 Jul – 4 Aug 2020	Q+A–Colmar Brunton	41	38	8	7	4.7	0.4
23 Sep 2017	2017 election result	30.12	46.35	0.47	13.17	6.05	1.98

=== Hauraki-Waikato ===
Electorate vote
Date	Polling organisation	LAB	MRI	
Date	Polling organisation	Nanaia Mahuta	Donna Pokere-Phillips	Rahui Papa
29–30 Sep 2020	Māori TV–Curia	61	14	N/A
23 Sep 2017	2017 election result	68.85	N/A	27.36

Party vote
Date	Polling organisation	LAB	MRI	NAT	GRN	NZF	ACT
29–30 Sep 2020	Māori TV–Curia	61	8	5	3	3	1
23 Sep 2017	2017 election result	61.5	11.3	6.87	5.14	8.34	0.09

=== Ikaroa-Rāwhiti ===
Electorate vote
Date	Polling organisation	LAB	MRI		GRN	ANZ	OUT
Date	Polling organisation	Meka Whaitiri	Heather Te Au-Skipworth	Marama Fox	Elizabeth Kerekere	Waitangi Kupenga	Kelly Thurston
23–25 Sep 2020	Māori TV–Curia	46	19	N/A	3	2	0
23 Sep 2017	2017 election result	53.68	N/A	35.27	8.41	N/A	N/A

Party vote
Date	Polling organisation	LAB	MRI	NZF	GRN	NAT	ACT
23–25 Sep 2020	Māori TV–Curia	62	10	3	3	2	1
23 Sep 2017	2017 election result	64.7	13	7.16	4.86	4.8	0.13

=== Tāmaki Makaurau ===
Electorate vote
Date	Polling organisation	LAB	MRI		GRN
Date	Polling organisation	Peeni Henare	John Tamihere	Shane Taurima	Marama Davidson
6–7 Oct 2020	Māori TV–Curia	35	29	N/A	14
23 Sep 2017	2017 election result	47.51	N/A	28.25	21.58

Party vote
Date	Polling organisation	LAB	MRI	GRN	NZF	NAT	ACT
6–7 Oct 2020	Māori TV–Curia	57	9	7	5	3	1
23 Sep 2017	2017 election result	59.34	10.96	7.24	9.53	6.55	0.16

=== Te Tai Hauāuru ===
Electorate vote
Date	Polling organisation	LAB	MRI	
Date	Polling organisation	Adrian Rurawhe	Debbie Ngarewa-Packer	Howie Tamati
23–25 Sep 2020	Māori TV–Curia	38	20	N/A
23 Sep 2017	2017 election result	43.86	N/A	39.21

Party vote
Date	Polling organisation	LAB	MRI	NAT	GRN	NZF	ACT	TOP
23–25 Sep 2020	Māori TV–Curia	51	10	4	4	3	2	1
23 Sep 2017	2017 election result	58.47	14.96	6.54	6.53	7.26	0.08	2.85

=== Te Tai Tokerau ===
Electorate vote
Date	Polling organisation	LAB	MRI	ANZ
Date	Polling organisation	Kelvin Davis	Mariameno Kapa-Kingi	Billy Te Kahika
6–7 Oct 2020	Māori TV–Curia	36	18	1
23 Sep 2017	2017 election result	52.60	N/A	N/A

Party vote
Date	Polling organisation	LAB	NZF	NAT	MRI	GRN	ACT
6–7 Oct 2020	Māori TV–Curia	58	6	4	7	7	1
23 Sep 2017	2017 election result	57.94	11.12	7.42	6.48	6.35	0.16

=== Te Tai Tonga ===
Electorate vote
Date	Polling organisation	LAB	MRI		GRN	
Date	Polling organisation	Rino Tirikatene	Tākuta Ferris	Mei Reedy-Taare	Ariana Paretutanganui-Tamati	Metiria Turei
4–5 Oct 2020	Māori TV–Curia	37	11	N/A	2	N/A
23 Sep 2017	2017 election result	44.44	N/A	20.97	N/A	24.5

Party vote
Date	Polling organisation	LAB	NAT	MRI	GRN	NZF	ACT
4–5 Oct 2020	Māori TV–Curia	53	16	5	5	2	2
23 Sep 2017	2017 election result	55.8	12.47	8.4	8.12	7.8	0.2

=== Waiariki ===
Electorate vote
Date	Polling organisation	LAB	MRI		VNZ
Date	Polling organisation	Tāmati Coffey	Rawiri Waititi	Te Ururoa Flavell	Hannah Tamaki
30 Sep – 1 Oct 2020	Māori TV–Curia	38	26	N/A	2
23 Sep 2017	2017 election result	53.74	N/A	46.26	N/A

Party vote
Date	Polling organisation	LAB	MRI	GRN	NAT	NZF	ACT
30 Sep – 1 Oct 2020	Māori TV–Curia	47	19	7	3	2	2
23 Sep 2017	2017 election result	58.95	19.71	3.86	4.75	7.42	0.08

== Forecasts ==
The use of mixed-member proportional representation allows ready conversion of a party's support into a party vote percentage and therefore a number of seats in Parliament. Projections assume the new electorate of Takanini will be won by either Labour or National and that Botany will be returned to National. Projections that show the National Party winning fewer than 41 total seats (41 being the number of electorate seats held by National during the 52nd Parliament) assume that National will lose at least enough electorates to avoid an overhang. Parties that do not hold an electorate seat and poll below 5% are assumed to win zero seats. Otherwise, projections assume no material change to the electorate seats held by each party. Parties that do not hold an electorate seat and poll below 5% are assumed to win zero seats.

When determining the scenarios for the overall result, the minimum parties necessary to form majority governments are listed (provided parties have indicated openness to working together). Actual governments formed may include other parties beyond the minimum required for a majority; this happened after the 2014 election, when National only needed one seat from another party to reach a 61-seat majority, but instead chose to form a 64-seat government with Māori, ACT and United Future.

Source	Seats in Parliament (Note: Forecasted seats are calculated using the Electoral Commission's MMP seat allocation calculator, based on polling results.)							Likely government formation(s)
Source	NAT	LAB	NZF	GRN	ACT	MRI	Total	Likely government formation(s)
Roy Morgan Sep 2020 poll	38	61	0	12	9	0	120	Labour (61)
1 News–Colmar Brunton 10–14 Oct 2020 poll	40	59	0	11	10	0	120	Labour–Green (70)
Newshub–Reid Research 8–15 Oct 2020 poll	41	61	0	8	10	0	120	Labour (61)
2020 result	33	65	0	10	10	2	120	Labour (65)

== See also ==
- Opinion polling for the next New Zealand general election
- 2017 New Zealand general election
- Opinion polling for the 2017 New Zealand general election
- Politics of New Zealand
