= Sixth Labour Government of New Zealand =

Government of New Zealand (2017–2023)

Sixth Labour Government
- Ministries of New Zealand
- 2017–2023
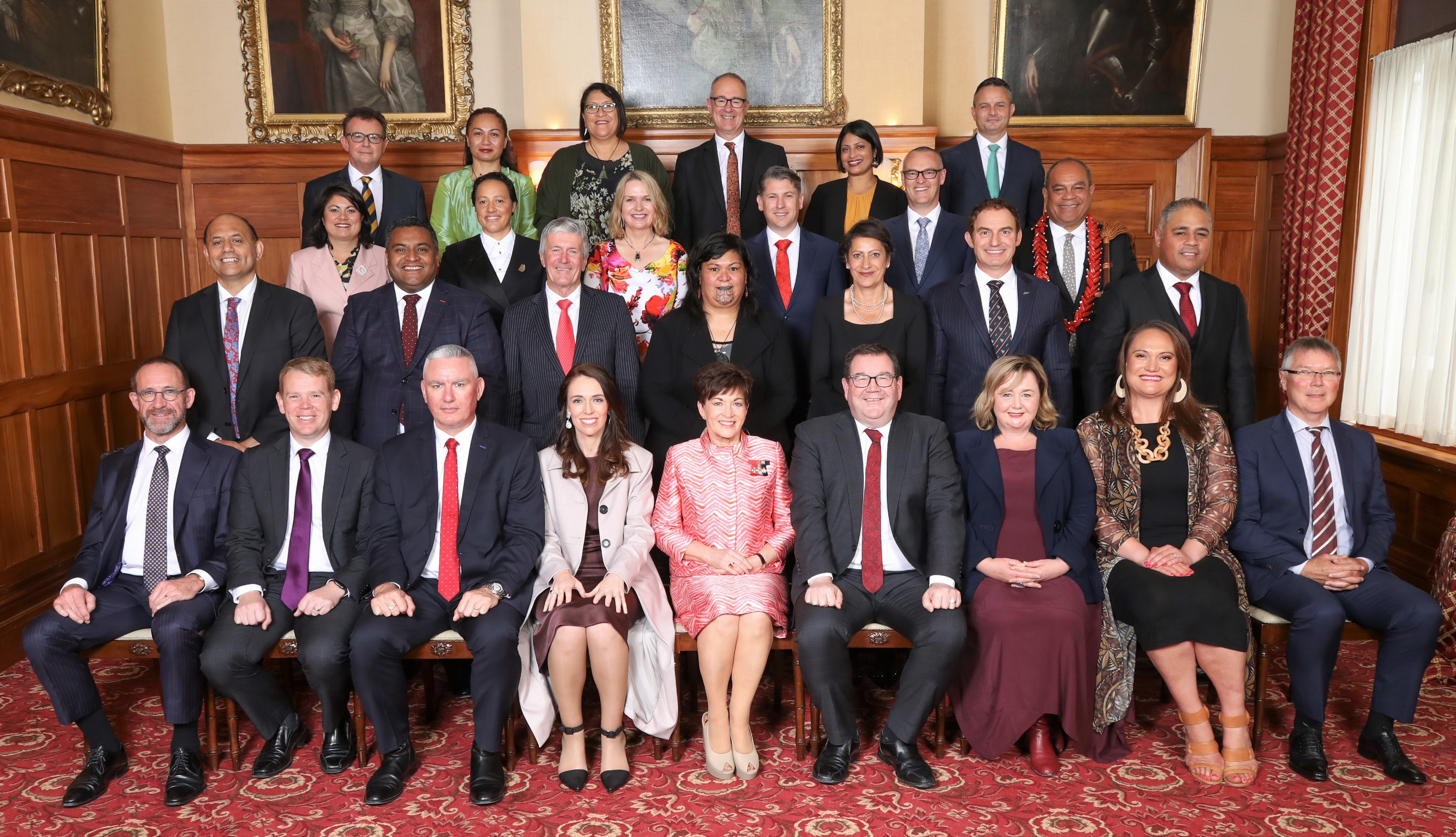
- Ministers pictured after their swearing-in, in November 2020
- Date formed: 26 October 2017
- Date dissolved: 27 November 2023

People and organisations
- Monarch: Elizabeth II (2017–2022); Charles III (2022–2023)
- Governor-General: Patsy Reddy (2017–2021) Cindy Kiro (2021–2023)
- Prime Minister: Jacinda Ardern (2017–2023); Chris Hipkins (2023)
- Prime Minister's history: 2017–2023; 2023
- Deputy Prime Minister: Winston Peters (2017–2020); Grant Robertson (2020–2023); Carmel Sepuloni (2023)
- Member parties: New Zealand Labour Party; Green Party of Aotearoa New Zealand (2017–2020) as confidence and supply (2020–2023) within a cooperation agreement; New Zealand First (2017–2020)
- Status in legislature: Minority (coalition) (2017–2020) with confidence and supply from the Greens; Majority (2020–2023) cooperation agreement with the Greens
- Opposition parties: National Party; ACT Party; Māori Party (2020–2023)
- Opposition leader: Bill English (2017–2018); Simon Bridges (2018–2020); Todd Muller (2020); Judith Collins (2020–2021); Christopher Luxon (2021–2023)

History
- Elections: 2017; 2020
- Legislature terms: 52nd Parliament; 53rd Parliament
- Budgets: 2018 budget; 2019 budget; 2020 budget; 2021 budget; 2022 budget; 2023 budget
- Predecessor: Fifth National Government
- Successor: Sixth National Government

The Sixth Labour Government governed New Zealand from 26 October 2017 to 27 November 2023. It was headed first by Jacinda Ardern (October 2017–January 2023) and later by Chris Hipkins (January 2023–November 2023), as Labour Party leader and prime minister.

On 1 August 2017, Ardern succeeded Andrew Little as both leader of the Labour Party and Leader of the Opposition. Following the 2017 general election held on 23 September, the New Zealand First party held the balance of power between the sitting centre-right National Party government, and the left bloc of the Labour and Green parties. Following negotiations with the two major parties, New Zealand First leader Winston Peters announced on 19 October 2017 that his party would form a coalition government with Labour. That same day, Green Party leader James Shaw announced that his party would give confidence and supply support to the 55-seat Labour–NZ First government. The Greens' support, plus the coalition, resulted in 63 seats to National's 56—enough to ensure that Ardern maintained the confidence of the House. Three years later, Labour went on to a landslide victory in the 2020 general election with 50% of the vote and 65 seats, an outright majority of the 120 seats in the House.

On 19 January 2023, Ardern announced her resignation and that she would not stand for re-election in the 2023 general election. Hipkins succeeded her as Prime Minister and leader of the Labour Party on 25 January 2023. Labour lost its majority to the opposition National Party following 2023 general election that was held on 14 October 2023. The Government remained in a caretaker capacity until the new National-led coalition government was sworn in on 27 November 2023.

== History ==
=== Formation ===
The general election on 23 September 2017 saw the New Zealand First party hold the balance of power between National and the centre-left bloc of Labour and the Green Party. Following several weeks of negotiations with both National and Labour, New Zealand First announced on 19 October 2017 it would form a minority coalition government with Labour. Confidence-and-supply support from the Greens, negotiated separately with Labour, enables the Government to have a majority in the House of Representatives. During the coalition-forming negotiations, Labour agreed to drop its proposed water tax on farmers as part of its agreement with New Zealand First. In return, NZ First agreed to drop their demand for referendums on overturning New Zealand's anti-smacking ban and abolishing the Māori electorates. The Greens consented to a confidence and supply agreement with Labour and New Zealand First in return for several concessions, including: a referendum on legalising cannabis, treating alcohol and drugs as a health issue, net zero emissions by 2050 and requiring a climate impact assessment analysis for all legislation

=== First term (2017–2020) ===
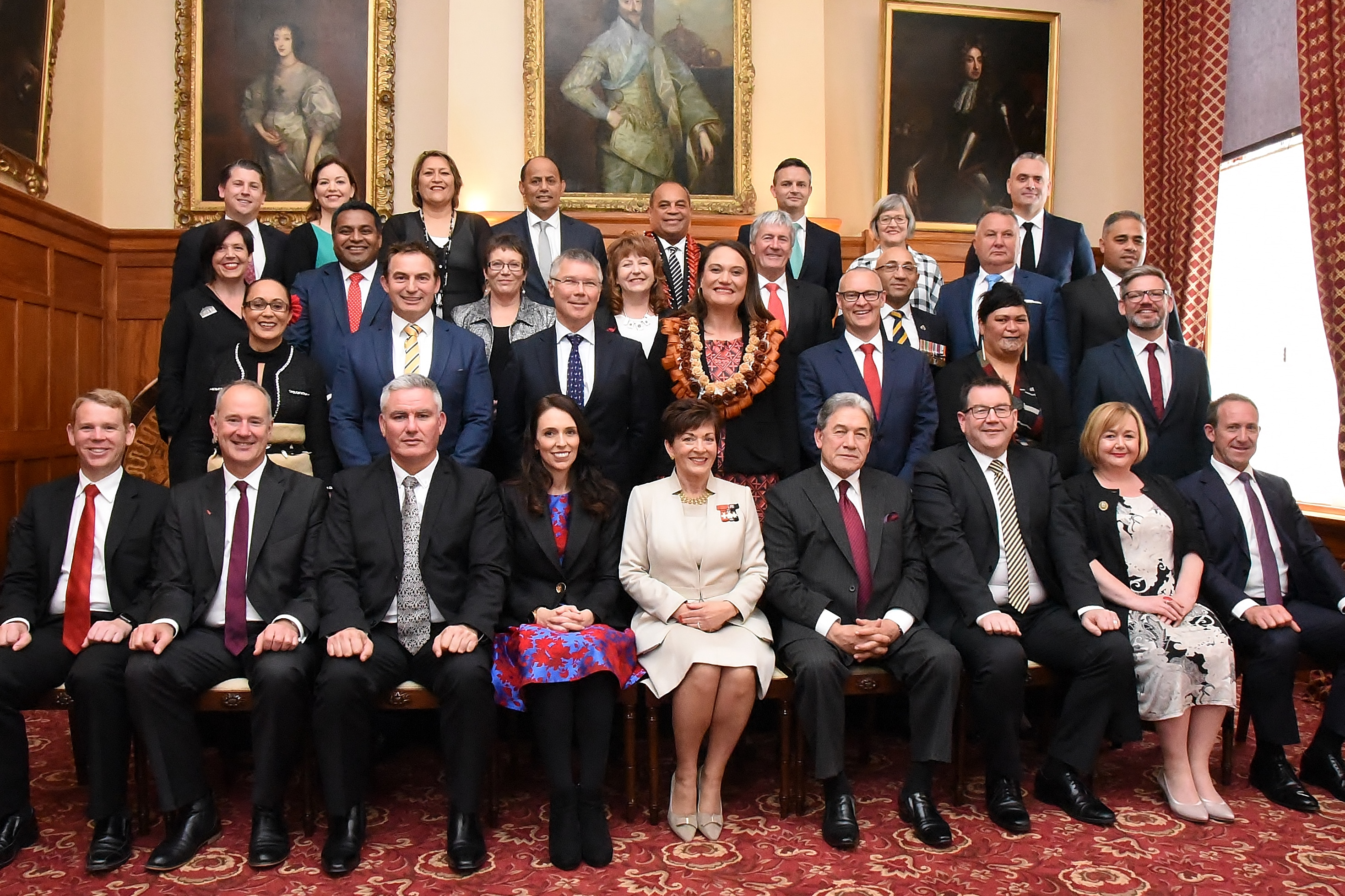
NZ First, Labour and Green ministers with the Governor-General, October 2017

==== 2017 ====
The Government made several policy announcements in late 2017. In terms of domestic policies, the Government reaffirmed its commitment to re-entering Pike River Mine by March 2019, scrapped National Standards in schools, released a mini-budget funded by cancelling National's tax cuts and created a Tax Working Group to reform New Zealand's taxation system and alleviate the country's housing crisis. In terms of foreign policies, the Government continued New Zealand's participation in the Trans-Pacific Partnership negotiations, opposed US President Donald Trump's move to recognise Jerusalem as the capital of Israel and reiterated New Zealand's support for the Two State Solution. In November 2017, Prime Minister Ardern offered to resettle 150 of the asylum seekers from the former Manus Regional Processing Centre in New Zealand, but was rebuffed by Australia's Turnbull Government.

==== 2018 ====
On 19 January 2018, Ardern revealed that she was expecting her first child in June, and that Deputy Prime Minister Winston Peters would serve as Acting Prime Minister while she took maternity leave for a period of six weeks. In June 2018, she temporarily relinquished her duties to Winston Peters, following the birth of her child, for a period of six weeks. Peters became Acting Prime Minister on 20 June 2018, when Ardern went into labour. Her six-week maternity leave concluded on 2 August 2018.

On the domestic front, the Labour-led coalition government implemented several policies and new laws. In terms of education, the Government introduced legislation to stop the creation of new charter schools while allowing the 11 existing schools to transition to "special character" schools. The Government also launched several transportation, homelessness, family relief, emergency response and health plans and programmes with the aim of improving infrastructure, services, and social and health outcomes. On 17 May, Finance Minister Grant Robertson released the 2018 New Zealand budget, allocating NZ$2.8 billion in operational funding and NZ$3.8 billion in capital funding. In October 2018, the Government formally established a new government department called the Ministry of Housing and Urban Development to manage housing and urban development issues.

The Government also passed legislation banning future oil and gas exploration, banning most non-residents from buying New Zealand homes and allowing terminally ill patients to use marijuana for palliative care. In June 2018, the Government abandoned efforts to repeal the Sentencing and Parole Reform Act 2010 (the so-called three-strikes law) due to opposition from NZ First. In December 2018, the Government announced that it would be holding a binding referendum on legalising the personal use of cannabis during the 2020 general election.

On the foreign policy front, Ardern stated that New Zealand would be seeking to shift away from a 'donor, recipient relationship' with Pacific Islands nations in favour of forming bilateral partnerships in March 2018. The Government also ratified the Comprehensive and Progressive Agreement for Trans-Pacific Partnership (an amended version of the TPP) in March 2018 and endorsed the UN's Global Compact for Migration in December 2018. In April 2018, Attorney General David Parker announced a government inquiry into allegations that the New Zealand Special Air Service had committed war crimes against Afghan civilians during Operation Burnham while stationed in Afghanistan.

==== 2019 ====
Following the Christchurch mosque shootings on 15 March 2019, Ardern announced that the Government would be reforming New Zealand's gun laws. On 10 April, the Government passed legislation banning semi-automatic firearms, magazines, and parts. In addition, the government announced an amnesty and buy-back scheme for prohibited firearms and components. Ardern also proposed legislation creating a national firearms register, tighter firearms restrictions and a ban on overseas visitors buying firearms in New Zealand.

In terms of defence policy, the Government announced the withdrawal of New Zealand forces in Iraq by June 2020. The New Zealand Defence Force's non-combat Building Partner Capacity (BPC) training mission had been training Iraqi Security Forces in support of the US-led coalition efforts to combat Islamic State forces in Iraq. In June 2019, the New Zealand military deployment in Afghanistan was extended for another 18 months. In June 2019, Defence Minister Ron Mark unveiled the Government's $20 billion Defence Capability Plan 2019, which aimed to boost the Defence Force's capabilities, equipment and manpower over the next 11 years.

In terms of economic development, the Government allocated NZ$100 million from the Provincial Growth Fund to supporting Māori economic development, NZ$27 million to improving transportation and the horticulture sector around Kaipara District and NZ$20 million to rebuilding Hillside Engineering in South Dunedin. In terms of employment policy, Workplace Relations and Safety Minister Iain Lees-Galloway announced that the Government would be raising the minimum wage to NZ$18.90 an hour from April 2020, a $1.20 increase from $17.70.

In terms of education policies, the Education Minister Chris Hipkins announced plans to merge the country's sixteen polytechnics into a "NZ Institute of Skills and Technology" by April 2020 in response to deficits and falling domestic enrolments. In May 2019, the Government invested NZ$95 million into teacher training programmes and scholarships over the next four years in order to address the teacher shortage. In August 2019, the Government proceeded to replace 11 industrial training organisations with several workforce development councils. Other notable education policies have included launching a trial free lunch programme, expanding the teaching of New Zealand history (particularly the Treaty of Waitangi and Māori history) in schools, and investing NZ$400 million in school property upgrades.

In terms of electoral law, the Government introduced legislation restoring the voting rights of prisoners serving less than three years imprisonment and banning foreign donations over NZ$50.

In terms of fiscal policies, the Government ruled out a capital gains tax. Key priorities of the 2019 New Zealand budget included creating a new frontline mental health service, investing $40 million in suicide prevention services, stationing nurses at secondary schools, building 1,044 new homes, investing $320 million into specialist services to address family and sexual violence, investing $200 million into apprenticeships and vocational training programs, investing $1 billion into KiwiRail, and investing $1.7 billion and $1.2 billion into repairing hospitals and schools respectively. In October 2019 the New Zealand Treasury and Finance Minister Grant Robertson released a report stating that the Government's surplus had increased from NZ$2 billion to NZ$7.5 billion. The net Government debt had also fallen to 19.2% of Gross Domestic Product (GDP), which is still short of its self-imposed Budget Responsibility Rules to keep debt at less than 20% of GDP. The total government revenue also increased from NZ$6.2 billion to NZ$86.5 billion as a result of taxation. However, the total district health board deficit rose to NZ$1 billion. The net Crown debt rose by 0.2% from NZ$57.5 billion in the 2017-2018 financial year to NZ$57.7 billion in 2019. In response, National's Economic development spokesman Todd McClay claimed that the Government was not investing enough money in taxpayers and highlighted declining business confidence.

In terms of health policies, the Government ordered 12 new radiation machines, invested NZ$60 million into Pharmac as part of a ten-year cancer action plan and created a Cancer Control Agency and Suicide Prevention Office. The Government also responded to a national measles outbreak by creating a National Health Coordination Centre.

In terms of housing policies, Minister of Housing and Urban Development Phil Twyford admitted in January 2019 that the government would be unable to meet its target of building 1,000 KiwiBuild homes by 1 July, with only 33 homes being built as of 23 January. The minister estimated that the government would be able to build only 300 houses by the 1 July deadline. In early September, Housing Minister Megan Woods announced that the Government would be revising its KiwiBuild programme, including scrapping its initial target of building 100,000 houses over the next years. In mid August 2019, the Associate Housing Minister Kris Faafoi and Social Development Minister Carmel Sepuloni announced that the Government would be launching a NZ$54 million program to tackle homelessness in New Zealand by hiring more staff to work with homeless people and investing $16 million in the Sustaining Tenancies Programme. In November 2019, Associate Housing Minister Kris Faafoi confirmed plans to amend the Residential Tenancies Act 1986 in favour of tenants' rights.

In terms of immigration policies, the Government scrapped the requirement for African and Middle Eastern refugee applicants to have relatives who were residing in New Zealand and ending a partnership visa policy that discriminated against Indian arranged marriages.

Other notable miscellaneous legislation in 2019 have included overturning "blasphemous libel" legislation, passing the End of Life Choice Act 2019 subject to a referendum at the next election and passing the Climate Change Response (Zero Carbon) Amendment Act. Other notable Government actions in 2019 have included re-entering Pike River Mine, upgrading the New Zealand–China Free Trade Agreement, and apologizing to the victims of the Erebus air disaster.

==== 2020 ====
===== COVID-19 mitigation =====
The global COVID-19 pandemic dominated the Government's attention and priorities for much of 2020. In late January, the Government chartered an Air New Zealand aircraft to assist in evacuating New Zealand, Australian, and Pacific Island nationals from Wuhan. On 2 February, temporary travel bans were imposed on COVID-hit countries like China and Iran. New Zealand's first COVID-19 case was confirmed on 28 February 2020.

On 14 March, the Government imposed isolation requirements on foreign travellers, which was followed by a strict border closure on 19 March. On 21 March, Ardern introduced a COVID-19 alert level system after COVID-19 cases rose to 52. On 25 March, the COVID-19 alert system was raised to Level 4, leading to the closure of schools and most businesses with the exception of essential services such as supermarkets, petrol stations and health providers. To comply with lockdown policies, Parliament adjourned for five weeks commencing 27 March. Prior to Parliament's closure, it passed three bills with cross-party support dealing with emergency spending, remitting interest on tax owed after 14 February, allowing local authorities to meet remotely, governments to take over schools, and suspending no-cause evictions and rent increases for six months. On 25 March, it was announced that Leader of the Opposition Simon Bridges would chair a cross-party committee called the Epidemic Response Committee to scrutinise the government's response to COVID-19.

Due to declining transmission rates, COVID-19 lockdown restrictions were eased between 28 April and 25 May, allowing more businesses, schools and public gatherings to reopen. On 13 May, the Government passed the COVID-19 Public Health Response Act 2020 which empowered Police to enter homes to enforce lockdown restrictions without a warrant. On 20 May, the Government released a COVID-19 contact tracing app called the NZ COVID Tracer. By 3 June, the Government had eliminated social distancing restrictions at businesses, public transportation and all public gatherings.

To address the economic impact of COVID-19, the Government announced various relief measures including a NZ$12.1 billion business package, a NZ$56.4 million Māori communities and businesses assistance package, NZ$27 million to support social service providers such as the Salvation Army and Women's Refuge, a NZ$1.5 billion wage subsidy scheme, a NZ$50 million media support package, a NZ$23 billion omnibus business support package, and a NZ$1.2 billion unemployment relief package. In late March 2020, Finance Minister Grant Robertson confirmed the government was negotiating with banks to ensure that nobody would lose their homes as a result of defaulting on mortgage payments during the pandemic. In mid-April, Ardern and National Party leader Simon Bridges confirmed that several ministers and MPs would take a 20 percent pay cut. The 2020 budget released on 18 June had a large focus on COVID-19 relief, with key provisions including a NZ$50 billion COVID-19 Response and Recovery Fund and a NZ$3.2 billion wage subsidy scheme.

Following the discovery of four community COVID-19 cases in Auckland on 11 August, the Government reintroduced national lockdown restrictions, with heightened restrictions for epicentre Auckland. Due to the outbreak, Ardern also delayed the 2020 New Zealand general election from 19 September until 17 October in response to the recent outbreak in COVID-19 community transmissions. In addition, the dissolution of Parliament was pushed back to 6 September. While the Government's second lockdowns were supported by Cabinet, NZ First leader Winston Peters and ACT leader David Seymour regarded them as unnecessary and economically damaging. Lockdown restrictions were eased on 21 September, with limits on public gatherings. On 12 October 2020, the Government signed an agreement with Pfizer and BioNTech to purchase 1.5 million COVID-19 vaccines and established a NZ$66.3 million fund to support COVID-19 immunisation programme.

===== Other policies and developments =====
In terms of education, the Government announced the introduction of climate change education into the school curriculum and gave parents the ability to consent to their children receiving religious instruction in schools. During the COVID-19 pandemic, the Government announced a NZ$87.7 million distance learning package, a NZ$130 million tertiary students' support package, and extending the school lunch programme. On 13 May, Education Minister Hipkins moved the National Certificate of Educational Achievement (NCEA) high school exams from 6 November to 16 November. In June, the Government launched a NZ$2.6 million trial initiative to combat "period poverty" by distributing sanitary products in 15 Waikato high schools.

In terms of electoral law, the Government coalition parties passed legislation in June 2020 restoring the right to vote for prisoners serving sentences of less than three years and abolishing the Electoral Commission's power to remove voters from the electoral roll. In terms of firearms policy, the Government passed legislation establishing a new firearms licensing entity and allowing farms and agrarian businesses to apply for firearms endorsements for pest control purposes.

In terms of foreign policies, the Government dispatched firefighters, medical personnel, and elements of the Royal New Zealand Air Force and New Zealand Army to assist with firefighting efforts during the 2019–20 Australian bushfire season. In late February, Ardern allocated NZ$2 million to Fiji's climate change relocation fund. In early May, Ardern met with Australian Prime Minister Scott Morrison and several Australian state and territorial leaders to discuss the development of a trans-Tasman COVID-safe travel zone. In late July, Ardern and Foreign Minister Peters announced that New Zealand would suspend its extradition treaty with Hong Kong in response to the Chinese Government's Hong Kong national security law introduced earlier that month.

In terms of health policies, the Government passed legislation decriminalising abortion, allocated significant public funding to purchasing personal protective equipment, ventilators and respiratory equipment, and supporting drugs and medicines purchasing agency Pharmac, close contact tracing and immunisation. In terms of housing, the Government passed legislation which eliminated rental bidding and "no-cause" evictions, raised the period of rent increases to 12 months and allowed victims of domestic violence to end a tenancy within two days' notice.

In terms of immigration policies, the Government extended temporary work visas due to travel restrictions and introduced fees for travellers quarantining at managed isolation and quarantine facilities. In other areas, the Government announced plans to merge TVNZ and Radio New Zealand into a new public broadcasting service, invested NZ$12 billion transport infrastructural New Zealand Upgrade Programme, NZ$300 million into the Aotearoa New Zealand Homelessness Action Plan, and NZ$1.9 million into acquiring fog cannons for dairies following a spate of robberies. In late June, the Government abandoned plans to build light rail connecting the Auckland CBD with Auckland Airport in Manukau due to disagreements between Labour and NZ First.

On 9 March, Ardern appointed Andrew Coster as the new Commissioner of Police, replacing Mike Bush who resigned in April 2020. Two high-profile ministerial resignations also occurred that year. On 2 July, Health Minister David Clark resigned from his portfolio after breaching COVID-19 lockdown restrictions. Following Clark's resignation, Ardern appointed Chris Hipkins as interim Health Minister. On 22 July, Ardern dismissed Iain Lees-Galloway from his Immigration, Workplace Relations and Accident Compensation Corporation (ACC) ministerial portfolios after he admitted having an inappropriate relationship with a former public service employee. Following his resignation, Kris Faafoi became Minister of Immigration while Andrew Little became Minister for Workplace Relations and Safety, and Carmel Sepuloni became Minister for ACC.

=== Second term (2020–2023) ===
==== 2020 ====
On 17 October, Labour won the 2020 general election in a landslide, winning 50% of the vote and 65 seats in the House, the first time under the current MMP system that any party won enough seats to govern without a coalition or a confidence and supply agreement. Following prolonged negotiations, the Green Party formed a confidence and supply agreement with the Labour Party on 31 October. Under this governing arrangement, co-leader James Shaw would remain Minister for Climate Change and become Associate Environment Minister while fellow co-leader Marama Davidson would become Minister for the Prevention of Family and Sexual Violence and Associate Minister of Housing. During a Zoom call, 85% of the 150 Green Party delegates voted to accept this confidence and supply agreement with Labour.

During its Speech from the Throne in late November 2020, major Government policy announcements included free COVID-19 vaccination, building 18,000 public homes, raising the minimum wage, replacing the Resource Management Act 1991 and promoting economic recovery from COVID-19 through infrastructure investment and training incentives. In terms of domestic policies, the Government announced plans to ban non-self contained hiring vehicles to combat "freedom camping," attract "super wealthy" tourists to New Zealand, encourage women to enroll in vocational education and the trades and extend various work and holiday work visa categories. On 2 December, Ardern declared a climate change emergency in New Zealand. She also announced several initiatives to reach the Government's 2025 carbon neutral target including requiring the public sector to buy only electric or hybrid vehicles, introducing new building standards for government buildings and phasing out coal-fired boilers in public service buildings. This motion was supported by the Labour, Green, and Māori parties but was denounced as "virtue signalling" by the opposition National and ACT parties.

In terms of foreign policy, Foreign Minister Mahuta joined her Australian, Canadian, British and United States counterparts in condemning the disqualification of pro-democracy Hong Kong legislators as a breach of Hong Kong's autonomy and rights under the Sino-British Joint Declaration. In mid-December, Ardern announced that New Zealand would be establishing travel bubbles with the Cook Islands and Australia in 2021. On 17 December, Ardern also announced that the Government had purchased vaccines from the pharmaceutical companies AstraZeneca and Novavax for New Zealand, Tokelau, the Cook Islands, Niue, Samoa, Tonga, and Tuvalu.

==== 2021 ====
In terms of domestic policies, the Government announced plans to make Matariki a public holiday, resume the country's refugee resettlement programme, reform adoption law, new housing initiatives, ban live cattle exports, a new Clean Car rebate scheme and extensive health sector reforms. In terms of new legislation, the Government also passed legislation entrenching Māori wards and constituencies on local councils, new counter-terrorism legislation and housing intensification legislation. In February, the Government compensated kiwifruit orchardists and Te Puke–based post harvest operator Seeka for damage caused by an outbreak of Pseudomonas syringae (PSA) in 2010. In June, Ardern also announced that the Government would apologise for the dawn raids which had disproportionately targeted members of the Pasifika communities during the 1970s and 1980s.

Other notable policy announcements and actions included a one-off "2021 Resident Visa" pathway for migrants on work visas, the Government's controversial Three Waters reform programme, a new Ministry for Disabled People, a new Social Security Insurance scheme, new freedom camping legislation and proposed smokefree legislation. The Government's fruit-picking worker recruitment and Progressive Home Ownership schemes drew criticism for wasteful spending and poor results. The Government's agricultural, environmental and Clean Car policies also attracted opposition from farming advocacy group Groundswell NZ, which mounted nationwide protests on 16 July.

On the foreign policy front, the Government suspended high-level bilateral military and political relations with Myanmar following the 2021 Myanmar coup d'état, participated in international evacuation efforts following the fall of Afghanistan to the Taliban and ratified a free trade agreement with the United Kingdom. The Government's decision to suspend the processing of Afghan residency visa applications was criticised by human rights advocates and Afghan migrants. On 7 October, Foreign Minister Nanaia Mahuta confirmed that the Government was sending a special representative to the Middle East to help 825 stranded Afghan visa holders to leave Afghanistan. Though the Government had granted 1,253 visas to Afghans, only 428 had arrived in New Zealand by early October 2021.

In terms of COVID-19 policies, New Zealand government imposed departure tests requirements for most international travellers entering in New Zealand and established a one-way travel bubble for Cook Islanders travelling to New Zealand. On 3 February 2021, Ardern approved Pfizer-BioNTech vaccine for domestic use. In February 2021, The Government implemented a brief Level 3 lockdown in Auckland following a COVID-19 outbreak in Papatoetoe, South Auckland. In mid-May 2021, Health Minister Andrew Little confirmed plans to amend Section 23 of the Medicines Act 1981 after the High Court Judge Rebecca Ellis ruled in favour of the Ngai Kaitiaki Tuku Ihu Medical Action Society's contention that the Government's decision to approve the Pfizer–BioNTech vaccine exceeded the Act's powers.

On 17 August, the Government reinstated Alert Level 4 restrictions nationwide in response to a community outbreak of COVID-19 Delta variant. On 23 August, Parliament was suspended for a week with the exception of online select committee hearings. National Party leader Judith Collins and ACT Party leader David Seymour criticised this suspension as undemocratic and an "overreach of power." Following disagreements over holding Parliamentary meetings via Zoom among political parties, Speaker Trevor Mallard opted for small gatherings inside the debating chamber. In late November, the Government passed controversial vaccine mandate legislation allowing businesses to dismiss employees who refuse to take COVID-19 vaccines and confirmed plans to ease managed isolation and quarantine entry requirements for travellers in 2022.

==== 2022 ====
In mid-January 2022, in a terms of COVID-19 policies, New Zealand government asked suppliers Abbott Laboratories, Roche, and Siemens to give it priority in ordering stocks of rapid antigen tests. Amid the outbreak of the new highly transmissible COVID-19 Deltacron hybrid variant spreading across the country, the Government announced they wouldn't impose further lockdowns, but indoor hospitality venues and events would instead be capped at 100 people, who would have to present proof of their COVID-19 vaccination currency. However, the Opposition's COVID-19 border restriction and vaccine mandate policies culminated in the occupation of Parliament grounds in Wellington by angry protesters between February and early March 2022, which ended in their forced removal by Police. In mid-May 2022, New Zealand government reopened the country's borders to various work, visitor and student visa holders. In mid-September of the same year, New Zealand government scrapped the country's COVID-19 Protection Framework ("traffic light system"); ending face-mask wearing and isolation requirements, and most vaccine mandates. On 5 December of the same year, New Zealand Prime Minister Jacinda Ardern stated that the government commissioned a royal commission of inquiry into its COVID-19 pandemic response.

In terms of domestic policies, the Government passed legislation banning sexual conversion therapy, created safe zones around the country's abortion providers, reform in public health services including the new Te Aka Whai Ora (Māori Health Authority), repealed the Sentencing and Parole Reform Act 2010, banned live animal exports, replaced the Children's Commissioner with the Children and Young People's Commission and Independent Children's Monitor, instituted collective bargaining at an industry-wide level, and introduced additional "smokefree" legislation.

The Government also launched a merger of the two public broadcasters Radio New Zealand (RNZ) and Television New Zealand (TVNZ) and its flagship Three Waters reform programme. Other notable 2022 initiatives included launching a New Zealand-centric "Te Takanga o Te Wā" history curriculum, reducing fuel excise taxes, road user charges and public transportation fares, allocating NZ$23 million from the State Sector Decarbonisation Fund to reduce greenhouse emissions, acquiring full ownership of Kiwibank and launching a national public transportation payment system called the National Ticketing Solution. The Government abandoned plans to add Goods and Services Tax (GST) to KiwiSaver fees. In November 2022, the Government and the Māori iwi/tribe Ngāti Mutunga o Wharekauri settled Treaty of Waitangi claims relating to the annexation of the Chatham Islands in 1842.

In March 2022, Ardern announced that New Zealand was facing a "cost of living crisis". On 19 July, the Government extended the 25-cent fuel tax cut and the half price public transportation subsidy until late January 2023 in response to rising living costs. On 1 August, the Government launched its "cost of living payment" support programme as part of the 2022 New Zealand Budget. The first NZ$116 payment was released on 1 August with the second and third payments on 1 September and 1 October 2022 respectively. The rollout was plagued by reports that overseas-based New Zealanders were receiving payments since the Inland Revenue Department had opted to dispense the payments automatically rather than manually check the eligibility of tax residents.

In response to rising gang activity and ram-raiding, the Government invested NZ$562 million in various anti-crime measures and announced that it would be introducing legislation to strengthen Police powers and combat gangs. In response to the murder of Janak Patel, Ardern and Hipkins announced that the Government would be launching a new retail crime package including a fog cannon subsidy scheme, supporting local councils' crime prevention programmes, and expanding the existing Retail Crime Prevention Fund eligibility to include aggravated robberies.

To address a national skills shortage, the Government launched a fast tracked residence policy in May 2022, which controversially excluded nurses, teachers and dairy farm managers. In August 2022, it also embarked on a NZ$14.4 million recruitment programme to recruit more doctors, nurses and radiographers in August. In December 2022, the Government also added nurses and midwives to its immigration green list, making them eligible for immediate residency in New Zealand.

On the foreign policy front, the Government contributed to disaster relief efforts following the 2022 Hunga Tonga–Hunga Ha'apai eruption and tsunami. The New Zealand–United Kingdom Free Trade Agreement was formally ratified in early March 2022. Following the Russian invasion of Ukraine, the Government expressed support for Ukraine and imposed sanctions on Russia with cross-party support. The Government also created a special work-visa programme for Ukrainian nationals with relatives in New Zealand and contributed NZ$4 million in humanitarian aid to Ukraine. The Government also contributed military aid and support to NATO and Ukrainian including military trainers and intelligence personnel. In addition, New Zealand supported Ukraine's legal defence at the International Court of Justice (ICJ) against Russian allegations of genocide in the Luhansk and Donetsk regions.

In terms of Australia-New Zealand relations, the Labour Government reached an agreement with the Morrison Government to accept 150 refugees a year from the Nauru Regional Processing Centre and asylum seekers in Australia awaiting processing. The NZ and Australian Governments also expressed concerns about a Solomon Islands security agreement with China. In late May 2022, Ardern met with United States President Joe Biden and Governor of California Gavin Newsom to discuss the Comprehensive and Progressive Agreement for Trans-Pacific Partnership (CPTPP), promote gun control and climate change cooperation.

==== 2023 ====
On 19 January, Ardern confirmed her resignation as Prime Minister, Labour Party Leader and MP for the Mount Albert electorate prior to the 2023 New Zealand general election, scheduled for 14 October. Following Ardern's resignation, Chris Hipkins was elected as Labour Party leader while Carmel Sepuloni succeeded Grant Robertson as Deputy Prime Minister. On 25 January, Hipkins and Sepuloni were formally sworn in as Prime Minister and Deputy Prime Minister respectively.

As Prime Minister, Hipkins announced that the Labour Government would focus on "cost of living" issues such as rising rent, food prices, the housing shortage and the economic impact of COVID-19. On 1 February, Hipkins announced that the Government would spend $718 million in various "cost of living" support measures including extending the fuel excise and half-price public transport subsidies until 30 June 2023, and extending discounted bus fares to Community Service card holders and tertiary students permanently from 1 July 2023. Between February and March 2023, the Government scrapped several policies and programmes including the proposed TVNZ–Radio New Zealand merger and plans to introduce hate speech legislation and lower the voting age to 16 years. Hipkins also confirmed that the minimum wage would be raised from NZ$21.20 to NZ$22.70 an hour from 1 April 2023 . In addition, the Government invested NZ$2 billion to provide "bread and butter" support to 1.4 million New Zealanders affected by the ongoing "cost of living" crisis.

In terms of disaster management, the Government responded to flood damage in the North Island caused by Cyclone Hale, the 2023 Auckland Anniversary Weekend floods and Cyclone Gabrielle by providing disaster and financial relief to affected communities. On 8 February, the Government invest NZ$3 million in discretionary flood recovery payments, NZ$1 million in supporting flood-affected businesses, and NZ$1 million in mental health support. On 23 February, the Government launched a ministerial inquiry into forestry companies' slash practices, which had exacerbated flood damage caused by Cyclone Gabrielle. On 14 May, the Government allocated NZ$941 million from the 2023 New Zealand budget to addressing flood and cyclone damage caused by the Auckland Anniversary Weekend floods and Cyclone Gabrielle. On 3 August, the Hawke's Bay Regional Council, Napier City Council, Hastings District Council, Wairoa District Council and Central Hawke's Bay District voted to accept the Government's NZ$556 million recovery cost-sharing package, which will be split evenly between the Government and local councils. .

In terms of foreign policy, Hipkins undertook his first overseas state visit to Canberra where he met Australian Prime Minister Anthony Albanese to reaffirm Australian-New Zealand bilateral relations. During the visit, Albanese agreed to amend Australia's deportation policy to reduce the deportation rate to New Zealand. Following the 2023 Turkey–Syria earthquake, the Government also contributed NZ$1.5 million to disaster relief efforts in those countries. Following the outbreak of the Gaza war on 7 October, the Government contributed NZ$10 million to the International Committee of the Red Cross's (ICRC) and the United Nations' World Food Programme's humanitarian relief efforts. In late October, the Government support UN calls for a "humanitarian pause" in Gaza and voted in favour of United Nations General Assembly Resolution ES-10/21.

In terms of education, Hipkins and Education Minister Jan Tinetti announced plans to reduce class sizes and increase the numbers of teachers in mid-April 2023. On 27 June, the Government invested NZ$128 million in increasing tuition subsidies between 2024 and 2025 for all tertiary institutions including universities, wānanga and the mega polytechnic Te Pūkenga.

In terms of environmental policies, the Government signed an agreement with US investment company BlackRock on 8 August to set up a NZ$2 billion investment fund to help reach the Government's target of 100 percent renewable energy by 2030. On 6 October, Minister of Conservation Willow-Jean Prime and Minister of Oceans and Fisheries Rachel Brooking announced that the Government would create six new marine reserves between Timaru and the Catlins in the lower South Island.

In terms of health, Health Minister Ayesha Verrall launched the 2023 Winter Health Plan to boost the capability of health services, vaccination campaigns, and recruit more health professionals. In early June, the Government announced plans to combat vaping among youths by banning the sale of disposable and reusable vapes in stages and restricting the locations of new vape stores.

In terms of water infrastructure, the Government overhauled its Three Waters reform programme in mid-April 2023, renaming it the Water Services Reform Programme. The proposed four water services entities were expanded into ten entities but will retain the same split co-governance structure consisting of representatives of local councils and mana whenua representatives. These changes passed into law on 16 August. On 23 August, the Government passed two further bills entrenching its Three Waters reforms. the Water Services Reform Programme. The Water Services Economic Efficiency and Consumer Protection Act 2023 established an economic regulation regime overseen by the Commerce Commission while the Water Services Legislation Act 2023 outlined the duties, functions and powers of the ten new water services entities, effective 2026. National and ACT have opposed the Three Waters programme and vowed to repeal them if elected into government following the 2023 New Zealand general election.

In terms of other infrastructure, the Government signed a cooperation agreement with Amazon Web Services in March 2023 to build large data centres to provide cloud storage services for government departments, local councils, schools, tertiary education providers, and other public service bodies. On 17 August, the Government unveiled a NZ$20 billion transport plan to build 14 new key roads and public transport over ten years.

In terms of justice, Hipkins announced the Government's youth justice policy which included introducing a new measure to punish adults convicted of influencing young people to commit crimes and making the publishing of recordings of criminal behaviour on social media an aggravating factor in sentencing. These legislative changes will not be implemented prior to the 2023 general election. That same day, Labour campaigned on introducing several new youth crime policies including building two "high-needs units" within youth justice residences in Auckland and Christchurch, improving safety and security at existing youth justice residences, focusing on crime prevention measures including family group conferences, and empowering Family Courts to require youth offenders to perform community services. On 10 July, Hipkins announced that the Government would introduce legislation to make ram-raiding a criminal offence with a ten-year sentence and allowing 12 and 13-year old ram raiders to be tried in Youth Courts. On 29 August, the Government's Ram Raid Offending and Related Measures Amendment Bill passed its first reading with support from the opposition National and ACT parties.

In terms of resource management, the Government passed the Natural and Built Environment Act 2023 and the Spatial Planning Act 2023, the first two laws in its planned overhaul of the Resource Management Act 1991, on 16 August. On 18 August, Agricultural Minister Damien O'Connor announced a NZ$370 million plan to help farmers reduce carbon emissions over a five-ear period.

In the 2023 New Zealand general election held on 14 October, the Labour Party lost its place as the largest party in parliament to the National Party. In final results, Labour gained 26.91% of the popular vote and its share of parliamentary seats dropped from 64 to 34. Hipkins conceded the election to National Party leader Christopher Luxon. The Labour Government remained in a caretaker capacity until the release of final results on 3 November 2023. On 10 November, Hipkins and Luxon advised Governor-General Cindy Kiro to prolong the caretaker government arrangement until the conclusion of coalition talks for the incoming National-led government. Following Foreign Minister Nanaia Mahuta's resignation, Grant Robertson assumed her foreign affairs portfolio while Willie Jackson assumed her associate Māori development portfolio. That month, Deputy Prime Minister Sepuloni and Trade Minister Damien O'Connor represented New Zealand at the 2023 Pacific Islands Forum and 2023 APEC summit. Following the conclusion of coalition negotiations between National, ACT and New Zealand First on 24 November, the new National-led coalition government was sworn into office on 27 November.

== Election results ==
The following table shows the total party votes and seats in Parliament won by Labour, plus any parties supporting a Labour-led government in coalition or with confidence and supply.

Election	Parliament	Government type	Party votes	Percentage	Total seats	Majority
2017	52nd	Labour–New Zealand First coalition (with confidence and supply from the Green Party)	1,305,333	50.36% Labour (36.89%); New Zealand First (7.20%); Green (6.27%)	63	6
2020	53rd	Labour majority (in co-operation with the Green Party)	1,443,546 (Labour); 226,757 (Greens)	57.87% Labour (50.01%); Green (7.86%)	75	30

== Significant policies and initiatives ==
=== Economic development, science and innovation ===
- Established a $1 billion Regional Development Fund
- Introduced a wage subsidy scheme for all workers unable to attend work during the nationwide lockdown resulting from COVID-19. This was later extended until October 2020.
- Interest-free loans were introduced for businesses as part of a package of economic policies in response to COVID-19

=== Education and workforce ===
- Abolished 90 day trials for larger firms
- Made the first year of tertiary education or training free from 1 January 2018
- Increased student allowances and living costs loans by $50 a week effective 1 January 2018
- Scrapped both National Standards for literacy and numeracy and primary school league tables
- Free driver training for all secondary school students
- Decile 1-7 schools were offered extra funding if boards chose to scrap voluntary donations
- Raised the minimum wage to $16.50 an hour in 2018, $18.90 in 2020, and $20.00 in 2021, representing and overall increase of around 6% per year
- Abolished NCEA fees
- Established the Pike River Recovery Agency with an accompanying ministerial portofolio plus a commitment by minister Andrew Little to re-enter Pike River Mine
- New Mana in Mahi program introduced to encourage employers, through wage subsidies, to take on young beneficiaries
- Signed a pay equity deal with education support workers to increase pay by 30%
- Pay for early childhood education workers was boosted in 2020, with the government increasing education and care services' subsidy rates
- Apprenticeship fees were scrapped from 1 July 2020 as a response to the economic downturn resulting from COVID-19
- Paid sick leave was doubled from five days to ten per year

=== Environment ===
- Established a Zero-Carbon Act with the goal of net zero emissions of carbon dioxide by 2050 and a 24-47% reduction in methane emissions relative to 2017
- Established an independent Climate Change Commission
- Set a target of planting one billion trees over the next ten years
- Re-established the New Zealand Forest Service
- Ceased tendering any new off-shore oil and gas exploration permits
- Phased out single-use plastic bags and other single-use plastic items including plastic produce bags, polystyrene takeaway containers and plastic plates, bowls and cutlery
- Reformed the Emissions Trading Scheme by adding an emissions cap and introducing other various changes
- Amended New Zealand's Paris Agreement Nationally determined contribution by increasing the 2030 target from a reduction of 30% to a reduction of 50% of net emissions relative to 2005 gross emissions

=== Finance and expenditure ===
- Cancelled the previous National Government's proposed tax cuts
- Established a Tax Working Group
- Fuel tax excise was increased, and local governments were enabled to charge regional fuel taxes. In 2022 in response to increasing inflation the fuel excise was cut by 25 cents, road user charges were reduced and public transport fares halved.
- Rolling increases to tobacco excise, in place since 2010, were cancelled in 2020

=== Foreign affairs, defence and trade ===
- Announced plans to initiate a Closer Commonwealth Economic Relations (CCER) agreement with the UK, Australia, Canada and other Commonwealth countries
- Announced plans to reopen trade talks with Russia (as part of the Labour–NZ First agreement). These talks were suspended in response to the poisoning of Sergei and Yulia Skripal
- A shift from a "donor, recipient" relationship to a partnership–based relationship with Pacific Island states was commenced
- Plans to ratify the Comprehensive and Progressive Agreement for Trans-Pacific Partnership
- Ratified the Global Compact for Migration
- Defence spending was significantly increased in the 2019 budget

=== Governance and administration ===
- Removed the ability for local government to impose height limits of less than six stories, and ended minimum car park requirements

=== Health ===
- Centralized all 20 District health boards into one national public health service, Te Whatu Ora - Health New Zealand, as well as establishing the Te Aka Whai Ora - the Māori Health Authority
- Established a ministerial inquiry into mental health, which resulted in the creation of Te Hiringa Mahara
- Introduced legislation to legalise medical cannabis
- Free doctors' visits for all under-14's was introduced
- Re-established the Mental Health Commission
- Plan to rebuild the Dunedin Hospital by 2026
- A bill banning smoking in cars with children present was passed
- A plan to provide free female sanitary products in secondary schools by 2021 was initiated
- Pill testing at summer festivals was legalised

=== Housing ===
- Passed the Healthy Homes Guarantee Act 2017, requiring all rental homes to be warm and dry
- Extended the bright-line test, which requires tax to be paid on the increase in value of a property resold within a given period, to five years. Later extended further to ten years.
- Restricted foreigners (with the exception of Australian citizens) from buying existing residential homes
- Ceased the sale of state houses
- Established an Affordable Housing Authority and implemented the KiwiBuild programme
- Comprehensive register of foreign-owned land and housing established
- A rent-to-own scheme as part of KiwiBuild
- Building consents for low risk projects, such as garden sheds and sleepouts, were scrapped.
- Legislation improving rights for renters was passed, which included rent increases being limited to once per year. No cause evictions were also scrapped.
- A shared ownership scheme with Kāinga Ora was introduced to assist first home buyers.

=== Immigration ===
- Reduce net immigration by 20,000–30,000 a year. Ardern later said there would be no immediate cut to immigration
- Creating a special refugee visa category to resettle Pacific Islanders displaced by climate change
- The refugee resettlement quota was increased, which met a longstanding commitment to the double the quota refugee advocacy campaign
- Temporarily closed national borders to all non-residents during the COVID-19 pandemic in New Zealand.

=== Justice ===
- Held a referendum on legalising recreational cannabis use
- Passed a law allowing survivors of domestic violence 10 days paid leave from work
- Allowed men convicted of historic crimes relating to consensual homosexual sex to have their records expunged
- Removed abortion from the Crimes Act via the Abortion Legislation Act 2020.
- Reinstated the right of prisoners, serving less than a three-year sentence, to vote in elections
- Banned the practice of conversion therapy on LGBT persons under the age of 18

=== Primary production ===
- Announced plans for a royalty on exports of bottled waters
- Divided the Ministry for Primary Industries into separate agriculture, forestry, and fishing departments
- Reduced public funding for irrigation projects while subsidising existing projects in early April 2018

=== Social services and community ===
- Legislated to introduce the Families Package (including Winter Energy Payment, Best Start, and increases to paid parental leave)
- Resumed funding to the New Zealand Superannuation Fund to keep the retirement age at 65
- The Family Tax Credit, Orphans Benefit, Accommodation Supplement, and Foster Care Allowance were all substantially increased as part of Labour's Families Package
- Introduced legislation to set a child poverty reduction target
- Established a Royal Commission of Inquiry into Abuse in Care
- Introduced a new generation SuperGold smart card with entitlements and concessions
- Removed some "excessive" benefit sanctions
- Set a target to eliminate the gender pay gap within the public sector
- A lunch programme was introduced for low decile schools.
- Welfare benefits were increased in response to COVID-19 and the Winter Energy Payment was temporarily doubled
- Funding for sexual and domestic violence services was significantly increased
- Increased main benefits by $25 per week effective from 1 April 2020.
- A weekly tax-free "income relief" payment was introduced for workers made redundant during the economic fall out of COVID-19.
- Social security benefits were indexed to wages instead of the Consumer Price Index, this would double the amount of benefit dependent persons would have otherwise received without wage indexation
- Increased abatement thresholds from $90 per week to $160 before social security benefits are abated.
- The 2021 budget substantially raised benefits, between $32 and $55 per week, for persons dependent on social security payments and was fully implemented in 2022. This reversed, in real terms, the 1991 benefit cuts in full.
- Passed the Births, Deaths, Marriages, and Relationships Registration Act 2021 making self-identification easier by removing the requirement for transgender New Zealanders to provide medical proof of medical treatment or a Family Court declaration before sex can be changed on a birth certificate.

=== Transport and infrastructure ===
- Re-allocated spending towards rail and cycling infrastructure, and road safety improvements
- Announced plans to reestablish light rail to Auckland Airport and to West Auckland
- Commuter rail in 18 months to Hamilton.
- Commuter rail to Hamilton and Tauranga.
- Commuter rail for Christchurch.
- Retain the Capital Connection from Palmerston North to Wellington.
- Funding for irrigation projects was reduced.
- Wairoa to Napier rail line reinstated.
- Feasibility study of moving the Port of Auckland to Northport, Whangarei, and upgrades of road and rail to Northport; as part of Labour-NZ First agreement.
- $12 billion was set aside to invest in the 'New Zealand Upgrade Programme', providing funding for infrastructure projects.

== List of executive members ==
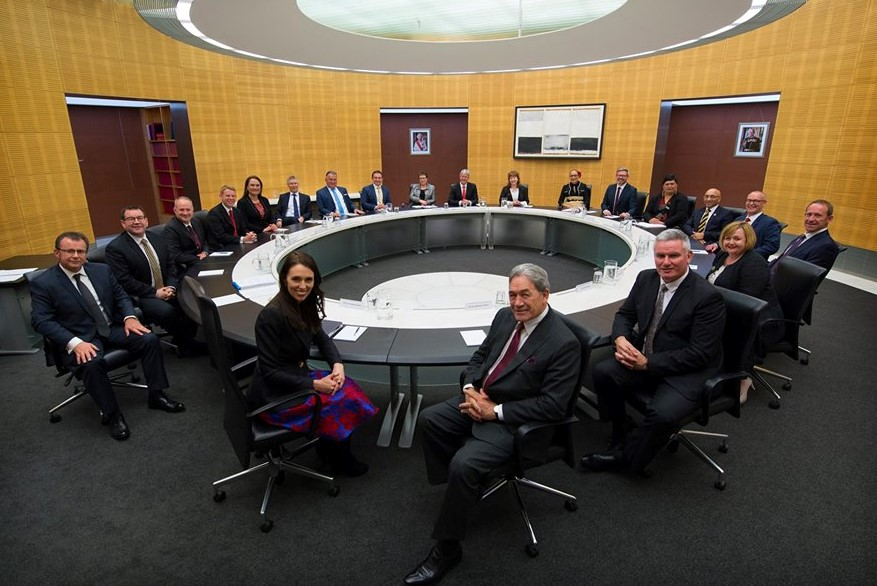
First meeting of the Cabinet of the Sixth Labour Government, 26 October 2017

In mid October 2017, Jacinda Ardern announced that the Cabinet would consist of 20 members, of which 16 would be from the Labour Party and 4 from New Zealand First. A further five Labour MPs would sit outside of Cabinet, along with three Green MPs.

On 27 June 2019, Ardern announced a cabinet reshuffle. She split the housing portfolio into three positions; appointing Megan Woods as Minister of Housing, Kris Faafoi as Associate Minister of Housing, and Phil Twyford as Minister of Urban Development. In addition, Grant Robertson was appointed as Minister Responsible for the Earthquake Commission; Jenny Salesa as Minister of Customs; and Peeni Henare became Minister of Civil Defence. In addition, several Labour Members of Parliament were appointed to various parliamentary positions including assistant speaker, senior government whip, and parliamentary private secretaries.

On 2 November 2020, after the 2020 election, a new cabinet reflective of the Labour majority was announced. It was sworn in on 6 November 2020. On 14 June 2022, a cabinet reshuffle occurred.

On 13 June 2022, a third cabinet reshuffle occurred. Kris Faafoi resigned from Parliament, with his immigration, justice, and broadcasting portfolios being assumed by Michael Wood, Kiri Allan, and Willie Jackson. In addition, Ardern confirmed that Speaker of the House Trevor Mallard would be resigning in mid-August 2022 to assume a diplomatic post in Europe. Adrian Rurawhe was designated as his successor. In addition, Poto Williams stepped down from her Police ministerial portfolio, which was assumed by Chris Hipkins. Priyanca Radhakrishnan was promoted to Cabinet while retaining her community and voluntary sector, ethnic communities, youth, associate social development portfolios and adopting the associate workplace relations portfolios. Former Chief Whip Kieran McAnulty became deputy leader of the House while gaining the associate transport, associate local government, emergency management and racing portfolios. In addition, Ayesha Verrall assumed the COVID-19 response and Research, Science and Innovation ministerial portfolios; Duncan Webb became the new Chief Whip; and Meka Whatiri assumed the food safety portfolio. Labour list MPs Dan Rosewarne and Soraya Peke-Mason replaced the outgoing Faafoi and Mallard.

Chris Hipkins succeeded Ardern as prime minister on 25 January 2023 and a minor cabinet reshuffle occurred to reallocate Ardern's and Hipkins' previous portfolios, as well as the appointment of Carmel Sepuloni as deputy prime minister. Hipkins announced a wider reshuffle of portfolios the following week, on 31 January. Andrew Little was replaced as Health Minister by Ayesha Verrall while Michael Wood was assigned the new Minister of Auckland portfolio. Kieran McAnulty succeeded Nanaia Mahuta as Minister of Local Government. Mahuta herself retained her Foreign Minister portfolio. Jan Tinetti was also appointed as Education Minister and gained the child poverty reduction. Ginny Andersen and Barbara Edmonds also joined Hipkins' Cabinet. Andersen assumed the "Digital Economy and Communications, Small Business, and Seniors ministerial portfolios as well as the immigration and Treaty of Waitangi Negotiations associate portfolios. Edmonds assumed the Internal Affairs and Pacific Peoples ministerial portfolio as well as health and housing associate portfolios.

=== Ministers ===
Portfolio	Minister	Party	Start	End
Prime Minister	Jacinda Ardern	Labour	26 October 2017	25 January 2023
Prime Minister	Chris Hipkins	Labour	25 January 2023	27 November 2023
Deputy Prime Minister	Winston Peters	NZ First	26 October 2017	6 November 2020
Deputy Prime Minister	Grant Robertson	Labour	6 November 2020	25 January 2023
Deputy Prime Minister	Carmel Sepuloni	Labour	25 January 2023	27 November 2023
Minister for Auckland	Michael Wood	Labour	1 February 2023	21 June 2023
Minister for Auckland	Carmel Sepuloni	Labour	21 June 2023	27 November 2023
Minister for ACC	Iain Lees-Galloway	Labour	26 October 2017	22 July 2020
Minister for ACC	Carmel Sepuloni	Labour	22 July 2020	1 February 2023
Minister for ACC	Peeni Henare	Labour	1 February 2023	27 November 2023
Minister of Agriculture	Damien O'Connor	Labour	26 October 2017	27 November 2023
Attorney-General	David Parker	Labour	26 October 2017	27 November 2023
Minister for Arts, Culture and Heritage	Jacinda Ardern	Labour	26 October 2017	6 November 2020
Minister for Arts, Culture and Heritage	Carmel Sepuloni	Labour	6 November 2020	27 November 2023
Minister for Building and Construction	Jenny Salesa	Labour	26 October 2017	6 November 2020
Minister for Building and Construction	Poto Williams	Labour	6 November 2020	14 June 2022
Minister for Building and Construction	Megan Woods	Labour	14 June 2022	27 November 2023
Minister of Broadcasting, Communications and Digital Media	Clare Curran	Labour	26 October 2017	7 September 2018
Minister of Broadcasting, Communications and Digital Media	Kris Faafoi	Labour	7 September 2018	14 June 2022
Minister of Broadcasting, Communications and Digital Media	Willie Jackson	Labour	14 June 2022	27 November 2023
Minister for Child Poverty Reduction	Jacinda Ardern	Labour	26 October 2017	25 January 2023
Minister for Child Poverty Reduction	Jan Tinetti	Labour	1 February 2023	27 November 2023
Minister for Climate Change	James Shaw	Green	26 October 2017	27 November 2023
Minister of Commerce and Consumer Affairs	Kris Faafoi	Labour	26 October 2017	6 November 2020
Minister of Commerce and Consumer Affairs	David Clark	Labour	6 November 2020	1 February 2023
Minister of Commerce and Consumer Affairs	Duncan Webb	Labour	1 February 2023	27 November 2023
Minister for the Community & Voluntary Sector	Peeni Henare	Labour	26 October 2017	27 June 2019
Minister for the Community & Voluntary Sector	Poto Williams	Labour	27 June 2019	6 November 2020
Minister for the Community & Voluntary Sector	Priyanca Radhakrishnan	Labour	6 November 2020	27 November 2023
Minister of Conservation	Eugenie Sage	Green	26 October 2017	6 November 2020
Minister of Conservation	Kiri Allan	Labour	6 November 2020	14 June 2022
Minister of Conservation	Poto Williams	Labour	14 June 2022	1 February 2023
Minister of Conservation	Willow-Jean Prime	Labour	1 February 2023	27 November 2023
Minister of Corrections	Kelvin Davis	Labour	26 October 2017	27 November 2023
Minister for COVID-19 Response	Chris Hipkins	Labour	6 November 2020	14 June 2022
Minister for COVID-19 Response	Ayesha Verrall	Labour	14 June 2022	1 February 2023
Minister of Customs	Meka Whaitiri	Labour	26 October 2017	20 September 2018
Minister of Customs	Kris Faafoi	Labour	20 September 2018	27 June 2019
Minister of Customs	Jenny Salesa	Labour	27 June 2019	6 November 2020
Minister of Customs	Meka Whaitiri	Labour	6 November 2020	3 May 2023
Minister of Customs	Damien O'Connor	Labour	3 May 2023	8 May 2023
Minister of Customs	Jo Luxton	Labour	8 May 2023	27 November 2023
Minister for Cyclone Recovery	Grant Robertson	Labour	21 February 2023	27 November 2023
Minister of Defence	Ron Mark	NZ First	26 October 2017	6 November 2020
Minister of Defence	Peeni Henare	Labour	6 November 2020	1 February 2023
Minister of Defence	Andrew Little	Labour	1 February 2023	27 November 2023
Minister of Disarmament and Arms Control	Winston Peters	NZ First	27 February 2018	6 November 2020
Minister of Disarmament and Arms Control	Phil Twyford	Labour	6 November 2020	1 February 2023
Minister of Disarmament and Arms Control	Nanaia Mahuta	Labour	1 February 2023	11 November 2023
Minister of Disarmament and Arms Control	Grant Robertson	Labour	11 November 2023	27 November 2023
Minister of Economic Development	David Parker	Labour	26 October 2017	27 June 2019
Minister of Economic Development	Phil Twyford	Labour	27 June 2019	6 November 2020
Minister of Economic Development	Stuart Nash	Labour	6 November 2020	12 April 2023
Minister of Economic Development	Barbara Edmonds	Labour	12 April 2023	27 November 2023
Minister of Education	Chris Hipkins	Labour	26 October 2017	25 January 2023
Minister of Education	Jan Tinetti	Labour	1 February 2023	27 November 2023
Minister for Emergency Management	Kris Faafoi	Labour	26 October 2017	27 June 2019
Minister for Emergency Management	Peeni Henare	Labour	27 June 2019	6 November 2020
Minister for Emergency Management	Kiri Allan	Labour	6 November 2020	14 June 2022
Minister for Emergency Management	Kieran McAnulty	Labour	14 June 2022	27 November 2023
Minister for the Environment	David Parker	Labour	26 October 2017	27 November 2023
Minister of Finance	Grant Robertson	Labour	26 October 2017	27 November 2023
Minister of Foreign Affairs	Winston Peters	NZ First	26 October 2017	6 November 2020
Minister of Foreign Affairs	Nanaia Mahuta	Labour	6 November 2020	11 November 2023
Minister of Foreign Affairs	Grant Robertson	Labour	11 November 2023	27 November 2023
Minister of Forestry	Shane Jones	NZ First	26 October 2017	6 November 2020
Minister of Forestry	Stuart Nash	Labour	6 November 2020	12 April 2023
Minister of Forestry	Peeni Henare	Labour	12 April 2023	27 November 2023
Minister of Health	David Clark	Labour	26 October 2017	2 July 2020
Minister of Health	Chris Hipkins	Labour	2 July 2020	6 November 2020
Minister of Health	Andrew Little	Labour	6 November 2020	1 February 2023
Minister of Health	Ayesha Verrall	Labour	1 February 2023	27 November 2023
Minister of Housing	Phil Twyford	Labour	26 October 2017	27 June 2019
Minister of Housing	Megan Woods	Labour	27 June 2019	27 November 2023
Minister of Immigration	Iain Lees-Galloway	Labour	26 October 2017	22 July 2020
Minister of Immigration	Kris Faafoi	Labour	22 July 2020	14 June 2022
Minister of Immigration	Michael Wood	Labour	14 June 2022	21 June 2023
Minister of Immigration	Andrew Little	Labour	21 June 2023	27 November 2023
Minister of Infrastructure	Shane Jones	NZ First	26 October 2017	6 November 2020
Minister of Infrastructure	Grant Robertson	Labour	6 November 2020	1 February 2023
Minister of Infrastructure	Megan Woods	Labour	1 February 2023	27 November 2023
Minister of Internal Affairs	Tracey Martin	NZ First	26 October 2017	6 November 2020
Minister of Internal Affairs	Jan Tinetti	Labour	6 November 2020	1 February 2023
Minister of Internal Affairs	Barbara Edmonds	Labour	1 February 2023	27 November 2023
Minister of Justice	Andrew Little	Labour	26 October 2017	6 November 2020
Minister of Justice	Kris Faafoi	Labour	6 November 2020	14 June 2022
Minister of Justice	Kiri Allan	Labour	14 June 2022	24 July 2023
Minister of Justice	Ginny Andersen	Labour	24 July 2023	27 November 2023
Leader of the House	Chris Hipkins	Labour	26 October 2017	25 January 2023
Leader of the House	Grant Robertson	Labour	1 February 2023	27 November 2023
Minister of Local Government	Nanaia Mahuta	Labour	26 October 2017	1 February 2023
Minister of Local Government	Kieran McAnulty	Labour	1 February 2023	27 November 2023
Minister for Māori Development	Nanaia Mahuta	Labour	26 October 2017	6 November 2020
Minister for Māori Development	Willie Jackson	Labour	6 November 2020	27 November 2023
Minister of National Security and Intelligence	Jacinda Ardern	Labour	26 October 2017	25 January 2023
Minister of National Security and Intelligence	Chris Hipkins	Labour	25 January 2023	27 November 2023
Minister for Oceans and Fisheries	Stuart Nash	Labour	26 October 2017	6 November 2020
Minister for Oceans and Fisheries	David Parker	Labour	6 November 2020	1 February 2023
Minister for Oceans and Fisheries	Stuart Nash	Labour	1 February 2023	12 April 2023
Minister for Oceans and Fisheries	Rachel Brooking	Labour	12 April 2023	27 November 2023
Minister for Pacific Peoples	William Sio	Labour	26 October 2017	1 February 2023
Minister for Pacific Peoples	Barbara Edmonds	Labour	1 February 2023	27 November 2023
Minister for Pike River Re-Entry	Andrew Little	Labour	26 October 2017	1 February 2023
Minister of Police	Stuart Nash	Labour	26 October 2017	6 November 2020
Minister of Police	Poto Williams	Labour	6 November 2020	14 June 2022
Minister of Police	Chris Hipkins	Labour	14 June 2022	25 January 2023
Minister of Police	Stuart Nash	Labour	1 February 2023	15 March 2023
Minister of Police	Ginny Andersen	Labour	20 March 2023	27 November 2023
Minister for Racing	Winston Peters	NZ First	26 October 2017	6 November 2020
Minister for Racing	Grant Robertson	Labour	6 November 2020	14 June 2022
Minister for Racing	Kieran McAnulty	Labour	14 June 2022	27 November 2023
Minister for Research, Science and Innovation	Megan Woods	Labour	26 October 2017	14 June 2022
Minister for Research, Science and Innovation	Ayesha Verrall	Labour	14 June 2022	27 November 2023
Minister of Revenue	Stuart Nash	Labour	26 October 2017	6 November 2020
Minister of Revenue	David Parker	Labour	6 November 2020	27 November 2023
Minister for Social Development	Carmel Sepuloni	Labour	26 October 2017	27 November 2023
Minister of State Owned Enterprises	Winston Peters	NZ First	26 October 2017	6 November 2020
Minister of State Owned Enterprises	David Clark	Labour	6 November 2020	1 February 2023
Minister of State Owned Enterprises	Duncan Webb	Labour	1 February 2023	27 November 2023
Minister for the Prevention of Family and Sexual Violence	Marama Davidson	Green	6 November 2020	27 November 2023
Minister for the Public Service	Chris Hipkins	Labour	26 October 2017	25 January 2023
Minister for the Public Service	Andrew Little	Labour	1 February 2023	27 November 2023
Minister of Statistics	James Shaw	Green	26 October 2017	6 November 2020
Minister of Statistics	David Clark	Labour	6 November 2020	1 February 2023
Minister of Statistics	Deborah Russell	Labour	1 February 2023	27 November 2023
Minister of Tourism	Kelvin Davis	Labour	26 October 2017	6 November 2020
Minister of Tourism	Stuart Nash	Labour	6 November 2020	1 February 2023
Minister of Tourism	Peeni Henare	Labour	1 February 2023	27 November 2023
Minister of Trade	David Parker	Labour	26 October 2017	6 November 2020
Minister of Trade	Damien O'Connor	Labour	6 November 2020	27 November 2023
Minister of Transport	Phil Twyford	Labour	26 October 2017	6 November 2020
Minister of Transport	Michael Wood	Labour	6 November 2020	21 June 2023
Minister of Transport	David Parker	Labour	21 June 2023	27 November 2023
Minister for Urban Development	Phil Twyford	Labour	27 June 2019	6 November 2020
Minister for Whānau Ora	Peeni Henare	Labour	26 October 2017	1 February 2023
Minister for Whānau Ora	David Parker	Labour	1 February 2023	27 November 2023
Minister for Women	Julie Anne Genter	Green	26 October 2017	6 November 2020
Minister for Women	Jan Tinetti	Labour	6 November 2020	27 November 2023
Minister for Workplace Relations and Safety	Iain Lees-Galloway	Labour	26 October 2017	22 July 2020
Minister for Workplace Relations and Safety	Andrew Little	Labour	22 July 2020	6 November 2020
Minister for Workplace Relations and Safety	Michael Wood	Labour	6 November 2020	27 November 2023
Minister for Youth	Peeni Henare	Labour	26 October 2017	6 November 2020
Minister for Youth	Priyanca Radhakrishnan	Labour	6 November 2020	1 February 2023
Minister for Youth	Willow-Jean Prime	Labour	1 February 2023	27 November 2023

=== Under-Secretaries & Private Secretaries ===
Ministry	Member of Parliament	Role	Party	Start	End
Health	Liz Craig	Private Secretary	Labour	3 May 2022	27 November 2023
Agriculture	Jo Luxton	Under-Secretary	Labour	1 February 2023	8 May 2023
Education	Jo Luxton	Under-Secretary	Labour	1 February 2023	8 May 2023
Revenue	Deborah Russell	Under-Secretary	Labour	6 November 2020	1 February 2023
Oceans and Fisheries	Rino Tirikatene	Under-Secretary	Labour	6 November 2020	1 February 2023
Trade and Export Growth (Māori Trade)	Rino Tirikatene	Under-Secretary	Labour	6 November 2020	1 February 2023
Disarmament and Arms Control	Fletcher Tabuteau	Under-Secretary	NZ First	27 February 2018	6 November 2020
Foreign Affairs	Fletcher Tabuteau	Under-Secretary	NZ First	26 October 2017	6 November 2020
Regional Economic Development	Fletcher Tabuteau	Under-Secretary	NZ First	26 October 2017	6 November 2020
Ethnic Communities	Michael Wood	Under-Secretary	Labour	26 October 2017	27 June 2019
Ethnic Communities	Priyanca Radhakrishnan	Private Secretary	Labour	27 June 2019	6 November 2020
Justice (Domestic and Sexual Violence Issues)	Jan Logie	Under-Secretary	Green	26 October 2017	6 November 2020
Local Government	Willow-Jean Prime	Private Secretary	Labour	27 June 2019	6 November 2020

== Controversies and issues ==
=== 2018 Labour Party youth camp sexual assaults ===
On 12 March 2018, allegations of multiple sexual assaults at the Young Labour Summer School at Waitawheta Camp in Waihi emerged. It was alleged that a 20-year-old man put his hands down the pants of four sixteen-year-olds on the second night of the camp, which occurred a month earlier. It was reported that there were "mountains of alcohol" present at the camp, and that people under the legal drinking age of eighteen were consuming alcohol. Prime Minister Jacinda Ardern was not informed of the allegations by party leadership, despite them knowing a month earlier. Support had not been offered to the victims, something Ardern said she was "deeply sorry" for. Ardern did not fire any of her party staffers who failed to act on information of the allegations and inform her. Former Prime Minister of the Fifth Labour Government Helen Clark criticised this response, saying "heads would have rolled" if she was at the helm.

In late November 2019, the man, who had pleaded guilty to two charges of indecent assault, was discharged without conviction. In response, one of the male victims expressed disappointment with the court decision, stating that they had lost faith in the justice system.

=== Ministerial resignations ===
On 24 May 2018, Transport Minister Phil Twyford resigned from his Civil Aviation portfolio after making an unauthorised phone call on a domestic flight as the plane was taking off, a violation of civil aviation laws. The matter had been raised by Opposition Transport spokesperson Judith Collins.

On 24 August, Ardern announced the removal of Clare Curran from Cabinet, and stripped her of her Open Government and Government Digital Services portfolios. These were reassigned to Education Minister Chris Hipkins and Energy and Resources Minister Megan Woods respectively. Curran's sacking was the result of her failure to disclose that she had held informal meetings with entrepreneur Derek Handley in November 2017 and February 2018, which could have created potential conflicts of interest. After a poor performance while answering a question from National's spokesperson for Broadcasting Melissa Lee during Question Time, Curran announced that she was stepping down as Minister for Broadcasting. She was to remain as MP for Dunedin-South, and Kris Faafoi resumed her Broadcasting portfolio.

On 30 August 2018, Customs Minister Meka Whaitiri "stood aside" from her ministerial portfolios as part of an investigation into an allegation that she assaulted a staff member in her ministerial office. Ardern announced that Ministerial Services was investigating the allegations. Fellow Labour MP Kris Faafoi assumed the role of Acting Minister of Customs while her associate ministerial portfolios were assumed by their lead ministers. On 20 September 2018, Ardern announced that she had fired Whaitiri from all of her ministerial portfolios. Ardern said that while aspects of the incident were disputed by Whaitiri, an incident involving Whaitiri manhandling and bullying a new staff member "undoubtedly took place". Kris Faafoi took over her portfolio of Customs. Whaitiri is to remain as the MP for Ikaroa-Rawhiti.

=== Karel Sroubek ===
In late October and early November 2018, the Immigration Minister Iain Lees-Galloway drew criticism from the opposition National Party for his decision to grant residency to the convicted Czech drug smuggler Karel Sroubek. It subsequently emerged that Sroubek had a lengthy criminal record in both the Czech Republic and New Zealand. The case also attracted considerable media interest in New Zealand and led the Czech government to announce that it would seek Sroubek's extradition. In mid-December 2018, Lees-Galloway attributed his decision to grant Sroubek residency to incomplete information provided by Immigration New Zealand about Sroubek's criminal record.

=== 2019 Labour Party sexual assault allegations ===
In early August 2019, several reports emerged about allegations of bullying, sexual harassment, and resignations from the Labour Party. Media were told that the formal complaints did not involve sexual assaults. On 9 September, the online media outlet The Spinoff published an exclusive report by a 19-year-old female Labour Party volunteer alleging that she had been sexually assaulted by a Labour Party staffer. In response to the report, Ardern said that she was repeatedly told by Labour that the complaint was not about sexual assault and that a review by Maria Dew QC will clear up the contradictory claims. The woman has stood by her claims while Labour Party President Nigel Haworth defended his handling of the complaints process.

On 11 September, Haworth resigned as Labour Party President following criticism of his handling of the complaints about the male staffer from several Labour Party members including bullying, harassment, and sexual assault. Earlier investigations had exonerated the man of these various claims. These sexual assault allegations attracted coverage from several international media including the AFP, The Washington Post, Seven News, The Times, and The Sydney Morning Herald. That same day, the National Party's deputy leader Paula Bennett claimed under parliamentary privilege that several of the Prime Minister's senior staff members and a Cabinet minister including Ardern's former chief of staff Mike Munro, current chief press secretary Andrew Campbell, and the director of the Labour leader's office Rob Salmond were aware of the sexual allegations.

On 12 September, the male Labour staffer accused of bullying and sexual assault resigned. He stated that he was cooperating with the Dew Inquiry and denied the allegations against him. On 16 September, Ardern announced that Labour would be holding a second inquiry into its response to the sexual assault allegations made against the staffer. Simon Mitchell, the lawyer tasked with leading Labour's investigation into the misconduct, stated that he was unaware of the sexual assault allegations until they were first reported by the media. National Party deputy leader Bennett claimed that the proposed inquiry did not go far enough and alleged that Finance Minister Grant Robertson had been aware of the sexual assault allegations as early as June 2019.

On 18 December, Labour Party President Claire Szabo released the report by Maria Dew QC. While Dew's report found insufficient evidence to support allegations of sexual assault and harassment, it found that the former Labour Party staffer had shown "overbearing and aggressive" behaviour on five occasions. Dew recommended a letter cautioning the former staffer and that he write a letter of apology and participate in a restorative justice process with the victim.

=== Shane Jones ===
In November 2019, Infrastructure Minister and NZ First MP Shane Jones claimed Indian arranged marriages to be a sham and not adhering to the New Zealand way of life. His comments, described as racist, went unchallenged from the Labour cabinet ministers. He also claimed that arranged marriage partners' visa rules would not apply anymore following changes to the immigration rules. Following a protest in Auckland, Immigration Minister Iain Lees-Galloway explained that immigration rules on arranged marriages were unchanged and clarified the misinformation provided by Shane Jones. Jones made further inflammatory comments against Indian students in January 2020.

=== Kris Faafoi ===
In December 2019, Broadcasting Minister Kris Faafoi was criticised after offering to speed up an immigration visa application for Opshop singer Jason Kerrison's father. Opposition Leader Simon Bridges claimed that Faafoi's actions if proven constituted a conflict of interest that breached Cabinet rules. Faafoi subsequently apologised to Ardern.

=== David Clark ===
In early April 2020, Health Minister David Clark drew widespread criticism when he flouted the level four lockdown restrictions during the COVID-19 pandemic in New Zealand on two occasions. This included driving two kilometres away from his home in Dunedin to ride a mountain bike trail and later driving his family 20 kilometres to a Dunedin beach for a family outing during the first week of the lockdown. After admitting to the two incidents on separate occasions, Clark offered his resignation as Health Minister to Ardern. Ardern declined to accept his resignation but stripped him of his Associate Finance Ministerial portfolio and demoted him to the bottom of Labour's Cabinet list.

However, Clark subsequently resigned on 2 July, and was replaced in Health by Chris Hipkins while Housing Minister Megan Woods assumed responsibility for Border Management.

=== 2020 Green School controversy ===
On 27 August 2020, Associate Finance Minister Shaw attracted criticism from the opposition National Party's education spokesperson Nicola Willis, school principals, teachers unions' and several members of his own Green Party after he allocated NZ$11.7 million from the Government's $3 billion COVID-19 recovery fund to the private "Green School New Zealand" in Taranaki. This funding boost violated the Green Party's own policy of private schools receiving state funds. Shaw had defended the decision, claiming it would have created 200 jobs and boosted the local economy. The Education Minister Chris Hipkins stated that he would not have prioritised funding for the private school and sympathised with state schools' dissatisfaction with Shaw's decision. Following considerable criticism, Shaw apologised for approving the funding of the Green School, describing it as "an error of judgment" on 1 September. Representatives of the school have reportedly approach the Crown to convert part or all off the Government's grant into a loan. On 2 November, it was reported that Michael and Rachel Perrett, the owners of the Green School, had reached a settlement for the Government's NZ$11.7 million grant to be converted into a loan; a development that was welcomed by local principals.

=== Alleged abuse of Parliamentary question time ===
In July 2021, the ACT party alleged that the Labour Government had spent $4 million-worth of Parliament's time asking itself questions since the 2020 election, in response to criticism of ACT's use of 15 minutes to ask its leader David Seymour questions about his member's bill, which has been described as "extremely unlikely to ever become law." Ministers being asked questions by their own party's MPs has been a feature of Question Time under successive governments for decades. The Shadow Leader of the House, National MP Chris Bishop, who has been critical of the use of "patsy questions" in the past, said that Seymour was showing "remarkable chutzpah" in complaining about the practice the day after making use of it himself.
