= Murder of Janak Patel =

Stabbing and robbery at New Zealand store

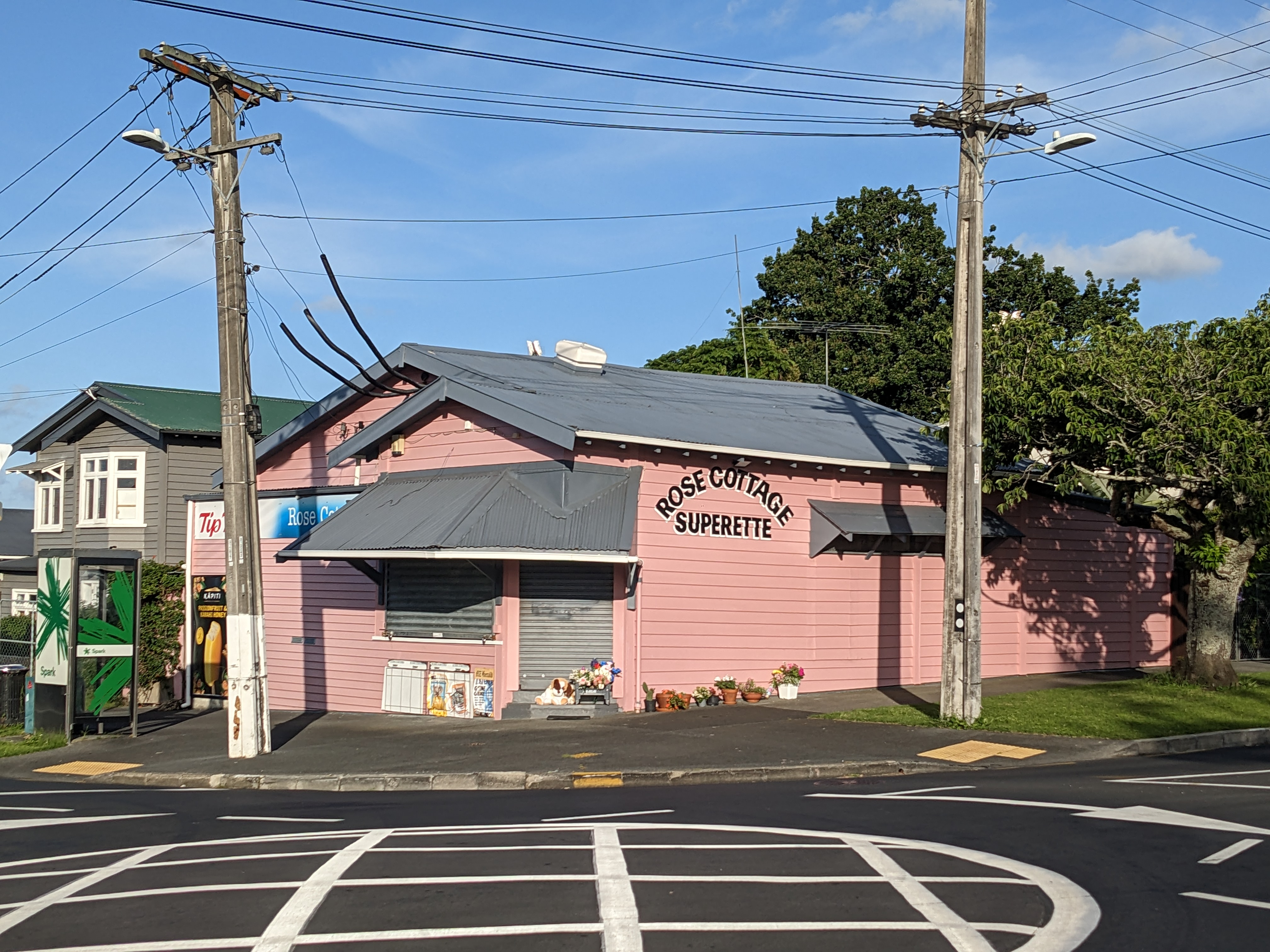
- Rose Cottage Superette
- Date: 23 November 2022
- Time: c. 20:05 (NZDT; UTC+13)
- Location: Sandringham, Auckland, New Zealand; 36°53′27″S 174°43′54″E
- Deaths: 1

On 23 November 2022, a dairy worker named Janak Patel was murdered during a robbery at the Rose Cottage Superette in Sandringham, Auckland, New Zealand. Police subsequently arrested three men in connection with the robbery and killing. The killing of Patel attracted significant attention from domestic media and political figures including Prime Minister Jacinda Ardern, Police Minister Chris Hipkins, and ACT Party leader David Seymour against the backdrop of an alleged recent crime wave targeting dairies and other retailers across New Zealand.

In March 2024, one of the defendants Frederick Hobson pleaded guilty to murder and aggravated robbery. In late June, Hobson was sentenced to life imprisonment with a minimum non-parole period of 15 years for murder while a second defendant Shane Tane was sentenced to four years and six months imprisonment for aggravated robbery. The third defendant Henry Ford was granted a stay in proceedings due to his terminal illness.

== Background ==
In April 2022, Stuff reported that a surge in retail crime that year including "ram raids," shoplifting, and repeat offending had prompted businesses to deploy a range of counter-measures including training staff to deal with aggressive customers, issuing stab-proof vests, radios, body cameras, automatic number plate recognition, and facial recognition systems. In response, the New Zealand Police created a national retail investigation unit to deal with rising retail crime. A University of Otago study also estimated that retail theft cost retailers NZ$1 billion a year in lost income and that retailers spent NZ$500 million a year on security. Retail NZ chief executive Greg Harford estimated that retail crime including shoplifting cost the average household NZ$800 per year. According to Dairy and Business Owners Association chairperson Sunny Kaushal, incidents of dairy and convenience store theft during the first 11 months of 2021 increased by 30 percent (1,402 offences) compared with 2020 while arrests for such crimes declined by 23 percent in 2021.

In late July 2022, The New Zealand Herald reported that incidents of retail crime including shoplifting, vandalism, and "ram raids" had doubled from 4,000 to under 8,000 in the five-year period between 2017 and the first six months of 2022; citing figures released by the Police to the opposition National Party. In addition, a 2019 Retail NZ survey estimated that 70% of retail crime was unreported. While Police attributed the increase in retail crime to improved reporting processes, the National Party blamed the crime surge on the Labour Government's alleged "soft on crime" on crime policies.

By late August 2022, the Police had secured NZ$6 million in government funding for the Small Retailer Crime Prevention Fund aimed at helping small businesses to procure countermeasures such as shatterproof glass, bollards, fog cannons, and roller doors. Other countermeasures have included companies hiring door staff to greet customers at the door with the goal of deterring potential offenders. By October 2022, Matthew Tierney, the manager of the Police's National Retail Investigation Support Unit, confirmed that the unit had dealt with over 70 retail crime offenders and laid nearly 600 charges against them.

== The incident ==
Rose Cottage Superette manager Janak Patel was a recent Indian migrant who had moved to New Zealand in 2022. He had only moved to Auckland from Hamilton a few days before the robbery, which occurred at 8pm on 23 November 2022. Patel had also recently married and his wife was also present at the dairy during the robbery.

At 8pm, Patel and his wife were in a backroom living area of the dairy at the time of the robbery when the masked offender Frederick Gilbert Hobson, an Ōtāhuhu resident who had been repatriated from Australia, entered the Rose Cottage Superette armed with a knife. Hobson had been stalking the area for the past 45 minutes, hiding in a telephone booth where he pretended to make calls. Patel confronted Hobson but retreated when the offender wielded his knife. Besides stealing the cash register, Hobson also stole several objects including butane lighters and vapes.

After exiting the store, Hobson walked about 100 metres towards Duncan Avenue. CCTV footage recorded him placing the cash register inside a household rubbish bin. At this point, the suspect was confronted by Patel, who had armed himself with a hockey stick. During the ensuing confrontation, Hobson used a tree branch to fend off blows from Patel's hockey stick. Hobson managed to knock the hockey stick out of Patel's hands and forced him to the ground on his back. After holding Hobson down with his left hand, Hobson proceeded to stab him several times with his right hand. Patel attempted to fight back and wrestled with Hobson for the hockey stick. Following a tussle, Hobson stabbed Patel in the neck, which caused him to fall to the ground.

Hobson subsequently left with the rubbish bin in a vehicle shortly later. The wounded Patel managed to retreat back to the store where he contacted emergency services, who administered first aid. During the confrontation, Patel sustained six stabs, including one to his chest and one to his back. Though Patel subsequently succumbed to his injuries, he managed to provide a description of the suspect to Police.

== Police investigation and manhunt ==
Following the Rose Cottage Superette's robbery and Janak Patel's killing, the New Zealand Police launched a homicide investigation and confirmed that they were hunting for a lone man in connection with those crimes. On 24 November, Police released three images of the suspect, who was described as wearing a black cap, a black and white bandanna, dark top, and a pair of black trousers emblazoned with the word "Raiders." Police also launched a post-mortem investigation into Patel's death. They also confirmed that the stolen till had been found inside a rubbish bin and issued a call to the public for CCTV footage and eyewitnesses.

On 25 November, the media company Stuff provided Police with CCTV footage showing two men and a black car. That evening, Police announced that their investigation had widened to two men and identified their get-away vehicle as a dark-coloured Honda Inspire. By 26 November, the Police confirmed that they had arrested two men in connection to the robbery and Patel's killing. The suspects were identified as a 34-year-old man charged with Patel's murder and aggravated robbery, and a 42-year-old man charged with robbery in relation to the incident. The two suspects appeared in the Auckland District Court where the murder suspect was granted interim name suppression. A 36-year-old man was charged with robbery on 27 November.

On 27 November, The New Zealand Herald reported that the suspect charged with murder had been deported from Australia earlier in 2022. In December 2014, the Australian Government had amended the Migration Act 1958 to make it easier to deport non-citizens who had been imprisoned for at least one year. Australia hosts a large New Zealand diaspora community, which numbered 650,000 by December 2019. By March 2022, a total of 2,544 New Zealanders had been deported from Australia over the past seven years. The accelerated deportations contributed to a surge in crime in New Zealand including over 2,000 dishonesty convictions, 1,387 violent crime convictions, 861 drug and anti-social behavior offenses, and 57 sexual crime offenses by March 2022. In addition, several Australian-based bikie gangs including the Comanchero and Mongols expanded their operations to New Zealand. Both Police Commissioner Andrew Coster and National Party leader Christopher Luxon attributed the rising crime rate and gang membership to the repatriation of New Zealand deportees from Australia.

== Legal proceedings ==
On 14 December 2022, the three defendants accused of participating in the Sandringham dairy robbery and murder of Janak Patel appeared at the Auckland High Court. A 34-year old Otahuhu resident, who received interim name suppression, pleaded not guilty to charges of aggravated robbery and murder. His co-defendants were identified as 34-year-old Wiri resident Henry Fred and 42-year-old Otahuhu resident Shane Henry Tane. Both Fred and Tane pleaded not guilty to charges of robbing the dairy's cash register and stealing vape and butane lighters. The robbery charges carry a prison term of up to ten years while the murder charge carries a term of life imprisonment. Justice Sally Fitzgerald remanded the defendants into custody until their next scheduled court appearance in March 2023. A five-week trial is scheduled for 20 May 2024.

On 8 March 2023, Fred and Tane had their charges upgraded from aggravated robbery to murder. In addition, name suppression lapsed for the third suspect and he was identified as Frederick Hobson. Hobson and Fred pleaded not guilty to the murder charge On 15 March, Tane pleaded not guilty to the murder charge. Hobson was also identified as the defendant accused of wielding the knife during Patel's murder and was the first of the three suspects to be charged with murder.

On 13 March 2024, Frederick Hobson pleaded guilty in the Auckland High Court to aggravated robbery and murder. Hobson's sentencing was scheduled for June 2024. The other two defendants still awaited trial on charges of aggravated robbery and murder. Dairy and Business Association chairman Sunny Kaushal welcomed Hobson's guilty plea but added that "our hearts still ache for this needless act of violence."

On 26 June 2024, Hobson was sentenced by Judge Simon Moore to life imprisonment with a minimum non-parole term of 15 years. In addition, co-defendant Shane Tane pleaded guilty to aggravated robbery and was sentenced to four years and six months imprisonment. The third defendant Henry Ford was granted a stay of proceedings due to his terminal illness. Hobson's lawyer read a statement stating that Hobson was ashamed and deeply remorseful for his actions. Judge Moore accepted Hobson's remorse and that his homelessness, unemployment and drug addiction contributed to the offending. During Hobson and Tane's sentencing, the Auckland High Court heard victim impact statements from Patel's mother, father, sister, and brother-in-law.

== Responses ==
=== Political responses ===
On 24 November, Minister of Police Chris Hipkins stated that Rose Cottage Superette had qualified for fog cannon funding from the Government and sought an explanation from the Police on why the shop's request for one had been declined. The Sandringham Neighbourhood Support Group had stated that Superette's owners had tried unsuccessfully for years to apply for support to install security measures.

Following Patel's death, Prime Minister Jacinda Ardern was criticised by ACT Party leader David Seymour for not postponing her trip to the Chatham Islands on 26 November 2022 and not visiting local dairies in Sandringham, which falls within the boundaries of her Mount Albert electorate. In response to criticism, Ardern defended her trip, stating that she had been in contact with Mount Albert community leaders. Ardern also said that she did not want to interfere with an active Police investigation and disturb Patel's grieving family. Ardern had visited the Chatham Islands as part of an official delegation to sign an agreement with the Māori iwi (tribe) Ngāti Mutunga o Wharekauri to settle historical Treaty of Waitangi claims.

On 26 November, Ardern met with Patel's family, the Sandringham Business Association and other community members. During a press conference at the Auckland Central Police Station, Ardern acknowledged the Police's investigation efforts and confirmed she had spoken with the owner of the Rose Cottage Superette. Ardern also confirmed that the Government was investigating ways to help small businesses including investing in fog cannons and other security measures.

On 28 November, Ardern and Hipkins announced that the Government would be launching a new retail crime package to combat retail crime including a fog cannon subsidy scheme; an NZ$4 million fund to support local councils' crime prevention programmes in Auckland, Hamilton and the Bay of Plenty; and expanding the existing NZ$6 million Retail Crime Prevention Fund eligibility to include aggravated robberies.

=== Civil society responses ===
On 25 November 2022, Dairy and Business Association chairperson Sunny Kaushal announced plans to hold a nationwide protest following Janak Patel's funeral. As part of the protest, thousands of dairies and small businesses will cease operations for a minimum of two hours. Kaushal also penned a guest column in The New Zealand Herald calling upon the Government to acknowledge that New Zealand was facing a "crime emergency" and for the introduction of self-defence laws allowing owners to defend their property with "acceptable force."

In response to Patel's death, Sandringham Business Association chair Jithin Chittibomma criticised the Government for ignoring the concerns of dairies and small business owners. He stated that "they [the Government] thought the perpetrators' rights were more important than the retailers."

On 26 November, the Migrant Workers Association organised a candlelit vigil outside the Rose Cottage Superette to pay respect to Patel. The Association's President Anu Kaloti called on the Government to take action but warned that "tough on crime" policies were doomed to fail. Unite Union organiser Joe Carolan also spoke at the vigil and called for a "culture of community" with no murder and greed. Members of the public laid flowers and tributes for Patel outside the dairy.

On 28 November, the Dairy and Business Owners Group staged a nationwide protest to honour Patel's memory, raise awareness of the plight of retailers, and protest perceived Government inaction against retail crime. 300 people attended a streetside vigil outside Ardern's electorate office in Mt Albert, which spilled into the nearby New North Road. Other vigils were also held across the country including a protest vigil outside Deputy Prime Minister Grant Robertson's Wellington Central electorate office.

By 3 December, a Givealittle page had raised NZ$91,000 for Patel's family. By 23 December, more than NZ$100,000 had been raised for Patel's family via the Dairy and Business Owners Group's Givealittle page.
