= New Zealand Upgrade Programme =

2020 infrastructure investment program

New Zealand Upgrade Programme (NZUP)
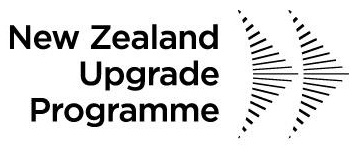
- Type of project: Infrastructure Programme
- Country: New Zealand
- Launched: 29 January 2020; 6 years ago
- Funding: $12 billion NZD
- Website: www.nzta.govt.nz/planning-and-investment/nz-upgrade

On 29 January 2020, the New Zealand Upgrade Programme was announced by Prime Minister Jacinda Ardern. The programme was a $12 billion infrastructure package to improve roads, rail, hospitals and schools around the country. A total of $8 billion was initially allocated and the other $4 billion made part of the infrastructure section of the 2020 budget.

== Background ==
Under the Labour coalition, a 2018 Government Policy Statement on transport gave greater priority to public transport spending.

== Contents ==
=== Transport ===
The government allocated $6.8 billion into transport: $5.3 billion on roads and $1.1 billion on rail. Auckland is to receive $3.48 billion of the transport funding.

==== Roads ====
Seven highway projects in the North Island with cost $4.63 billion and are to be built over the following five to eight years. Some of them were formerly 'Roads of National Significance'.

Auckland receives $2.2 billion to be put towards roads, which mayor Phil Goff says will be put toward the $1.3 billion Mill Road highway, set to begin construction in late 2022, and the $411 million Penlink toll road between Whangaparāoa Peninsula and State Highway 1, set to start in late 2021 and be complete by 2025. State Highway 1 between Papakura and Drury South would also be widened from four to six lanes.

Wellington receives $1.35 billion, including funding for the $258 million Melling interchange set to start construction in late 2022 and expected to be completed by 2026, as well as $59 million going towards the improvement of State Highway 58 between Hutt Valley and Porirua. A new four-lane highway would be built from Ōtaki to north of Levin, bypassing the existing two-lane State Highway 1; this project will cost $817 million and start construction in 2025 with an estimated completion date of 2029.

$991 million is to be spent in Waikato and the Bay of Plenty, including constructing the Tauranga Northern Link, widening State Highway 2 from Te Puna to Omokoroa to four lanes, and a roundabout at the SH 1/SH 29 intersection at Piarere. The Tautanga Northern Link is planned to connect State Highway 29 to State Highway 2 at Te Puna, with a cost of $478 million and a construction start date of late 2020, set to be completed by 2025.

$692 million is to be spent in Northland on a four-lane highway from Marsden Point to Whangārei.

In the South Island, Canterbury receives $159 million mainly for highway safety projects, while Queenstown receives $90 million to improve public transport into the town centre.

==== Footpaths and cycleways ====
Auckland is to put $360 million of its $3.48 billion towards its first walking and cycling path across the Waitemata Harbour as a shared path over the Harbour Bridge known as SkyPath, providing one of the "critical links" in completing the city's walking and cycling network.

==== Rail ====
Three rail projects in Auckland are funded: $371 million towards extending electrification of Auckland's rail network from Papakura to Pukekohe, $247 million to develop the Drury railway station with two new stations at Drury East and Drury West, and $315 million to build an additional rail line between Wiri and Westfield in South Auckland; the third main line project.

In Greater Wellington, $211 million is put towards upgrading the lines from Wellington to Palmerston North and Masterton. It includes new passing loops at Maymorn and Carterton railway station; a second platform at Featherston; new rolling stock storage facilities at Wellington, Levin, and Masterton; signalling upgrades; level crossing safety upgrades; refurbishing the Capital Connection rolling stock; and safety and capacity improvements at Wellington Station junction.

=== Healthcare ===
Hospitals have been allocated $300 million, which includes $96 million on mental health and addiction services and $83 million on child and maternal health. A further $75 million is to be put towards addressing poor conditions in hospitals and $26 million goes towards regional and rural services. The spending on child and maternal health includes upgrading neonatal care facilities in Counties Manukau, Auckland, Hutt Valley, and Wellington, while maternity facilities are to be upgraded in South Canterbury and the Hutt Valley. A new acute mental health care unit is to be funded in Whakatāne. A further $5.2 million would be made available for hospitals to replace coal boilers used for heating with biomass boilers as well as a contingency fund of $20 million.

=== Education ===
Schools have been allocated $4.8 million to replace coal boilers used for heating with biomass boilers.

== Estimated impact ==
The NZ Transport Agency estimates that between 7000 and 9000 jobs would be created by the first five transport projects.

The government estimates that the programme would give a $10 billion boost to New Zealand's economy over its first five years.

== Reactions ==
The Labour Government promoted the package. Jacinda Ardern said the programme was "a once in a lifetime opportunity to invest in New Zealand – modernising our infrastructure, preparing for climate change and helping grow the economy". Deputy Prime Minister Winston Peters said the programme was the largest infrastructure investment in decades. Transport Minister Phil Twyford says the projects will speed up travel times, ease congestion and make roads safer by taking trucks off the road and on to rail. Finance Minister Grant Robertson called the programme "the biggest boost to infrastructure spending in New Zealand in more than a generation", adding that "a decade of under investment ... was a 'handbrake' on the economy".

Mayor of Auckland and former Labour MP Phil Goff praised the government's plans as "wise", saying "I commend the Government for delivering on our calls".

Former opposition leader Simon Bridges criticised the government for "pick[ing] up where National left off", saying that it "has realised it has no infrastructure ideas of its own that it can deliver on, so it has copied the plans I put in place when I was Transport Minister".

Environmental groups Greenpeace and Generation Zero criticised the spending, with Greenpeace saying that spending more on roads "will only contribute to more of the dirty emissions that are driving the climate emergency". Associate Minister of Transport Julie Anne Genter agreed, writing that "A Green Party upgrade would have prioritised differently".

== See also ==
- Grand go-ahead policy analogous Vogel scheme from the 1870s
- Think Big analogous Muldoon scheme from the 1980s
