= 2019 New Zealand budget =

- Submitted by: Grant Robertson
- Country: New Zealand
- Parliament: Parliament of New Zealand
- Party: Labour
- Surplus: ▲$3.5 billion
- Website: Budget 2019

Budget 2019, dubbed the Wellbeing Budget, was the name given to the New Zealand budget for fiscal year 2019/20 presented to the New Zealand House of Representatives by Finance Minister Grant Robertson on 30 May 2019. This was the second budget presented by the Coalition Government. Its release was complicated by the accidental publication of budgetary documents on a test website two days prior to its official release on 30 May, attracting significant media and public attention.

== History ==
In late May 2019, the Labour-led Coalition Government announced that the 2019 New Zealand budget would be the country's first "Wellbeing Budget", reflecting its focus on addressing mental-health issues, child well-being, supporting Māori and Pasifika aspirations, encouraging productivity, and transitioning to a sustainable economy. The "Wellbeing Budget" sought to address these issues by:

- breaking down agency silos and working across government to assess, develop and implement policies that improve wellbeing;
- focusing on outcomes that balance the needs of present generations with those of future generations;
- tracking progress with broader measures of success including the health of the country's finances, natural resources, people and communities.

The release of the "Wellbeing Budget" was complicated by the accidental publication two days earlier of budgetary documents on a test website which the Treasury had not intended to be publicly available. The opposition National Party gained access to these documents and criticized security. This leak initially raised allegations of hacking - with the usual confusion over different definitions of "hacking" ensuing - and was referred to the New Zealand Police before a senior Treasury official confirmed that the leak had been accidental. Opposition Leader Simon Bridges also criticized the Government's handling of the data leak and called for the resignations of Finance Minister Robertson and Treasury Secretary Gabriel Makhlouf.

== Major announcements ==
The Coalition Government has allocated NZ$3.8 billion in operational funding and NZ$10.4 billion in capital funding for the Wellbeing Budget.

=== Mental health ===
- Investing NZ$445 million into creating a new mental health frontline service.
- Investing NZ$40 million into expanding suicide prevention services.
- Stationing more nurses at secondary schools.
- Building 1,044 new homes under the Housing First programme.

=== Child wellbeing ===
- Investing $320 million into special services to address family and sexual violence.
- Supporting Oranga Tamariki to help transition children living in state care into independent living.
- Increasing funding to decile 1–7 schools so that schools do not need to ask for donations from parents.
- Lifting incomes by indexing main benefits and removing punitive sanctions.

=== Māori and Pasifika aspirations ===
- Investing NZ$81 million in Whānau Ora to improve primary health outcomes.
- Investing in Māori and Pasifika language programmes.
- Investing NZ$10 million to increase the Pacific Provider Workforce Development Fund to support a Pacific Health workforce pipeline.
- A $12 million programme to combat rheumatic fever, which is prevalent among the Māori and Pasifika communities.

=== Encouraging productivity ===
- Investing NZ$300 million into establishing a New Zealand Venture Investment Fund (NZVIF) to encourage start-up companies.
- Investing NZ$106 million into encouraging businesses to help transition New Zealand into a low-carbon economy.
- Investing NZ$200 million into vocational and trade training programs.

=== Economic transformation ===
- Investing NZ$1 billion into KiwiRail.
- Investing NZ$95 million into science and research on climate change and new energy technologies.
- Encouraging sustainable land use with a $229 million package.

=== Other areas ===
==== Education ====
- Allocating NZ$1.2 billion for a school property refurbishment programme, starting with NZ$287 million in 2019 for new buildings.

==== Defence ====
- $1.7 billion to purchase Boeing P-8A Poseidon maritime patrol aircraft.

==== Health ====
- Investing NZ$1.7 billion into upgrading and rebuilding hospitals over the next two years including the Dunedin Hospital.
- Extending the bowel cancer screening programme to five more district health boards.
- Investing NZ$2.9 billion into district health boards.

=== Transportation and provincial growth ===
- Investing NZ$1.4 billion to upgrade and maintain the Auckland City Rail Link.
- Allocating NZ$855 million to the Provincial Growth Fund from the multi-year capital allowance.

== Reaction ==
The Opposition Leader Simon Bridges criticized the Wellbeing Budget, claiming that New Zealand First "held the purse strings, with funding for rail and forestry". Bridges also claimed that the economy was in decline and business confidence were at record lows. Similarly, ACT Party leader David Seymour claimed that the Wellbeing Budget failed to provide the fiscal policies needed for stronger economic growth.

The Auckland Action Against Poverty Coordinator Ricardo Menéndez March and left-wing blogger Martyn Bradbury criticized the Budget for lacking new initiatives to addressing rising poverty and inequality. Left-wing political commentator Chris Trotter opined that the Wellbeing Budget violated the principle of no taxation without representation.
