= 2020 New Zealand budget =

Budget of New Zealand for the year 2020

- Submitted by: Grant Robertson
- Presented: 14 May 2020
- Country: New Zealand
- Parliament: 52nd
- Party: Labour
- Deficit: ▼$23.1 billion
- Website: Budget 2020

Budget 2020, dubbed "Rebuilding Together", was the New Zealand budget for fiscal year 2020/21 worth NZ$50 billion, presented to the House of Representatives by Finance Minister Grant Robertson on 14 May 2020, the third budget presented by the coalition government of 2017–2020. This budget occurred during the COVID-19 pandemic in New Zealand and on the same day that the country exited the lockdown brought about by alert level 3.

== Background ==
The 2020 budget was released in the midst of the global COVID-19 pandemic, which spread to New Zealand in late February 2020. In response to an increase in the number of COVID-19 cases, the country entered into a nationwide lockdown on the evening of 25 March, in which all non-essential businesses were closed. Because of the closure of businesses, the government offered a $12.1 billion wage subsidy scheme to offset employment costs in an attempt to keep as many New Zealanders as possible in their jobs.

The original contents of the budget were set aside and replaced with a plan on how New Zealand will recover from the lasting effects of COVID-19, of which this budget is only the first step. Finance Minister Grant Robertson states that the economic recovery for New Zealand will create an extended operating deficit and increase debt to above previous targets, however he points out that New Zealand entered the COVID-19 crisis with a debt of below 20% of GDP compared to the United States with 90% and the United Kingdom with above 75%. The budget expands on the $12 billion New Zealand Upgrade Programme infrastructure project.

== Major announcements ==
The 2020 budget included the allocation of NZ$50 billion to the COVID-19 Response and Recovery Fund, which would be spent on several areas including a $3.2 billion wage subsidy scheme, business support, trades training support, a $1.1 billion environmental jobs package, $900 million to support Māori, housing, and extending the school lunch programme. $15.9 billion would be spend on rejuvenating the economy while $20.2 billion would be put aside for future investment.

=== Arts and culture ===
- Investing $246.8 million operating total and $37.5 million total capital in supporting the local film industry, culturally significant historical collections, and improving the accessibility of public media platforms to the deaf and Pasifika communities.
  - Investing $5.3 million operating total and $26.6 million total capital in preserving the Crown's audio-visual heritage content including broadcast news, documentaries, films, music, and oral histories.
  - Investing $25 million in crucial public media platforms including the Pacific Media Network (PMN), disability media (captioning and audio descriptions) and community access radio stations.
  - Investing $6 million in Heritage New Zealand's efforts to renovate the Kate Sheppard House into a heritage and public education space.
  - Investing $46.6 million operating total and $146 million in constructing a new Archives New Zealand facility and renovations to the National Library of New Zealand.

=== Defence and foreign affairs ===
- Investing $927.7 million in operating total and $942.5 million in defence and foreign affairs.
  - Allocating $666.3 million operating total for the Defence portfolio including information and communications technology, defence infrastructure, and the capabilities of the New Zealand Defence Force.
  - Investing $897.6 million in replacing the Defence Force's ageing C-130H Hercules fleet with newer C-130J Super Hercules aircraft.
  - Investing $10.2 million to improve the Defence Force's internal security.
  - Allocating $840,000 to veterans' affairs from the COVID-19 response and recovery fund.
  - Investing $55.6 million in Official Development Assistance (ODA) to Fiji, Vanuatu, Solomon Islands and Timor-Leste.

=== Education ===
- Investing $813.6 million operating total and $115.1 million in total capital in education.
  - Investing $375.1 million in the education sector including early childhood education, school operations grants, trade academies, and tertiary providers.
  - $414.2 million for early childhood education providers.
  - Investing $79.7 million in learning support services including English as a Second Language and students with needs.
  - Investing $119.5 million operating total and $115.4 million total capital in school property.
  - Investing $291.6 million in the Early Learning Education Package.

=== Employment ===
- Investing $1.6 billion in free trades and vocational training.
  - Investing $200 million in a Māori employment package.
- Investing $1.1 billion in an environmental jobs package to create 11,000 jobs.

=== Ethnic communities ===
- Investing in a $900 million support package for the Māori community.
  - Investing $50 million for a Māori trades training fund
  - Investing $136 million for Whānau Ora Commissioning Agencies to continue delivering care packages and support to Māori communities.
  - Investing $200 million in Māori language programmes, teachers' salaries, and maintaining school facilities.
  - Investing $11 million in targeted housing innovation.
- Investing in a $195 million support package for the Pasifika communities.

=== Health ===
- Investing a total of $5.6 billion operating total and $755 million total capital in health services.
  - Investing $3.9 billion in the country's 20 District health boards.
  - Investing $160 million in the Combined Pharmaceutical Budget.
  - Investing $832.5 million in the Supporting New Zealanders to Live Good Lives initiative.
  - Investing $177 million in maternity services and the Maternity Action Plan.
  - Investing $750 million in capital investment into district health boards.

=== Housing ===
- Investing $56 million in the "Warmer Kiwi Homes" programme to build an addition 9,500 homes.

=== Infrastructure ===
- Investing an extra $3 billion to fund infrastructure projects in addition to the $12 billion already invested.

=== Justice sector ===
- Investing $606.1 million operating total and $169.7 million in the justice sector including legal aid, community law centres, and the Canterbury Earthquakes Insurance Tribunal.
  - $47.8 million to replace ageing communications capabilities for the New Zealand Police, Fire and Emergency New Zealand, and ambulance services.
  - Investing $36.9 million operating total and $163.5 million total capital in upgrading court buildings around New Zealand.
  - Investing $110.4 million in supporting safety and security of Corrections staff and prisoners.

=== Primary Industries ===
- Investing $443.7 million operating total and $42.5 million total capital in primary industries.
  - Investing $193.5 million in the Mycoplasma bovis eradication programme.
  - Allocating $126.1 million into funding the Ministry for Primary Industries' operations.
  - Investing $43.4 million operating total and $36.2 million in the "Rebuilding Forestry Emissions Trading Scheme (ETS) Infrastructure to Meet Demand and Support the Transition to the Low Emissions Economy."

=== Social sector ===
- Investing $663 million operating total and $87.2 million in total capital in social services.
  - $246.1 million investment in community services including $183 million for family violence service providers.
  - Investing $43.3 million in community services for disabled peopled.
  - Investing $19.8 million in improving access to community services in regional New Zealand.
  - Investing $833 million in disability support services.

=== Transport ===
- Investing $222.9 million operating total and $1.1 billion total capital into improving transportation services and infrastructure across New Zealand.
  - Investing $148.2 million to enable rail activities to be funded by the Land Management Act and Crown funding for the National Land Transport Fund.
  - Investing $399.5 million to replace ageing Interislander ferry assets.
  - Investing $421.7 million to replace ageing locomotives, upgrade KiwiRail's mechanical maintenance facilities, and Auckland's train control system.

=== Tourism ===
- Investing $400 million in a Tourism Recovery Fund. The amount will be divided up between a nationwide domestic tourism campaign, targeted advice for businesses, and asset protection.

== Reactions ==
On 14 May, Leader of the Opposition Simon Bridges described the 2020 budget as the "greatest burden of debt" in New Zealand history and accused the Government of burdening the country's children and grandchildren with NZ$140 billion worth in debt. Business New Zealand chief executive Kirk Hope welcome the 2020 budget's free trades and apprenticeship scheme, describing it as a way of "turbo-charging" the economy. Tourism Industry Aotearoa chief executive Chris Roberts welcomed the NZ$400 million tourism recovery fund and wage subsidy scheme but stated that further extensions were needed to support the tourism sector. Mental Health Foundation chief executive Shaun Robinson welcomed the Budget's investments in addressing family violence, Whānau Ora services and housing, and targeted funding towards Māori.

The New Zealand Council of Trade Unions (CTU) welcomed the 2020 Budget's efforts to address the economic effects of the COVID-19 pandemic through wage subsidies, free trades training, and increased health spending and social spending but opined that other issues such as higher wages needed to be tackled. The Aotearoa New Zealand Association of Social Workers (ANZASW) welcomed the 2020 budget's investment into aiding disabled people and addressing elder abuse and child abuse but expressed disappointment at the pay gap between social workers in statutory organisations and non-governmental organisations (NGOs).

Auckland Action Against Poverty criticised the 2020 budget for not doing enough to aid welfare beneficiaries. Fish & Game New Zealand welcomed the Budget 2020's announcement of NZ$1.1 billion investment to create 11,000 environmental jobs in the regions. The Opportunities Party's leader Geoff Simmons criticised the 2020 budget for prioritising businesses over people and advocated a universal basic income in order to stimulate economic growth.
