= 2018 New Zealand budget =

- Submitted by: Grant Robertson
- Country: New Zealand
- Parliament: Parliament of New Zealand
- Party: Labour
- Surplus: ▲$3.1 billion
- Website: Budget 2018

The New Zealand budget for fiscal year 2018/19 was presented to the New Zealand House of Representatives by Finance Minister Grant Robertson on 17 May 2018.

This was the first budget by the Sixth Labour Government of New Zealand, and the first presented by Grant Robertson as Minister of Finance.

== Background ==
In mid-May 2018, the Government allocated NZ$2.8 billion in operational funding and NZ$3.8 billion in capital funding to the 2018 New Zealand Budget. According to a New Zealand Herald report, 38% of the Budget's funding was generated from adopting a slower debt track than the previous National Government; 23% from extra revenue from economic growth; 6% from cutting previous programmes and greater tax collection compliance.

== Major announcements ==
=== Economic development and infrastructure ===
- Investing NZ$393 million in operational funding and NZ$1.1 billion in capital funding into the Auckland City Rail Link, water and road infrastructure to increase housing supply, and KiwiRail.
- Establishing an NZ$1.0 billion Provincial Growth Fund to boost regional economic development and facilitate the planting of one billion trees.

=== Education ===
- Investing NZ$1.4 billion into early childhood education, children with learning disabilities, and $395 million into building new schools and classrooms.

=== Employment and immigration ===
Investing NZ$88 million into increasing the number of labour inspectors, funding compliance and border activities to combat migrant exploitation, and training programmes for unemployed youths.

=== Environment ===
- Investing NZ$257 million in operation funding and NZ$113 million in capital funding into funding the Department of Conservation's pest management and conservation work.
- Allocating NZ$179 million in operation funding and NZ$100 million in capital funding into establishing a Green Investment Fund to encourage private investment in low-carbon industries and clean technology; establishing a Climate Change Commission; and biosecurity funding.

=== Foreign affairs and trade ===
- Investing NZ$1.1 billion in operation funding and NZ$44 million in capital funding into expanding New Zealand's diplomatic and trading capabilities including a new embassy in Stockholm, funding New Zealand's representation at the United Nations Committee on the Rights of Persons with Disabilities, and boosting New Zealand's Official Development Assistance.

=== Health ===
- Investing NZ$3.2 billion into district health boards to cover core services like maternity services, disability support, air ambulances and bowel screening over a four-year period.
- Allocating NZ$385 million to subsidise free doctor visits for children under 13 years old and cheaper doctor visits for community card holders.
- Investing NZ$112 million into supporting community midwives including granting them an 8.9 percent fee increase to ensure parity with DHB midwives.

=== Housing and homelessness ===
- Invest NZ$634 million in operation funding and $369 million in capital funding into building 6,400 new homes over the next four years to address the shortage in social housing, the Housing First initiative, implementing the Healthy Homes Guarantee Act, and providing insulation grants for eligible owner occupiers.

=== Justice ===
- Investing NZ$1 billion into increasing police numbers, community housing, and funding the management of those serving prison and community-based sentences.

=== Māori development ===
- Allocating NZ$56 million to support the new Crown-Māori relations portfolio, improvement Māori youth outcomes and land development, and supporting Māori housing providers.

=== Research and development ===
- Investing $1 billion into a Research & Development tax incentive to encourage businesses to innovate.

=== Social development and children ===
- Investing NZ$460 million into family violence services and including 17 year olds in the youth justice system to provide them with appropriate support.
- Investing $179 million into extending free doctor visits to under-14 year olds, clothing support to children on the Orphans' Benefit and Unsupported Child's Benefit, setting up a new child poverty unit, and continuing funding to the KidsCan and KickStart programmes.

== Reaction ==
As is tradition, the Leader of the Opposition, Simon Bridges, moved a motion of no confidence in reply to the Budget speech. Bridges claimed the Budget showed "a Government that is borrowing more, taxing more and spending more — but has no plans for how we as a country can earn more." In response, Prime Minister Jacinda Ardern claimed the Opposition was "a lot of shouty shouty, and not a lot of planny planny."
