= Security smoke =

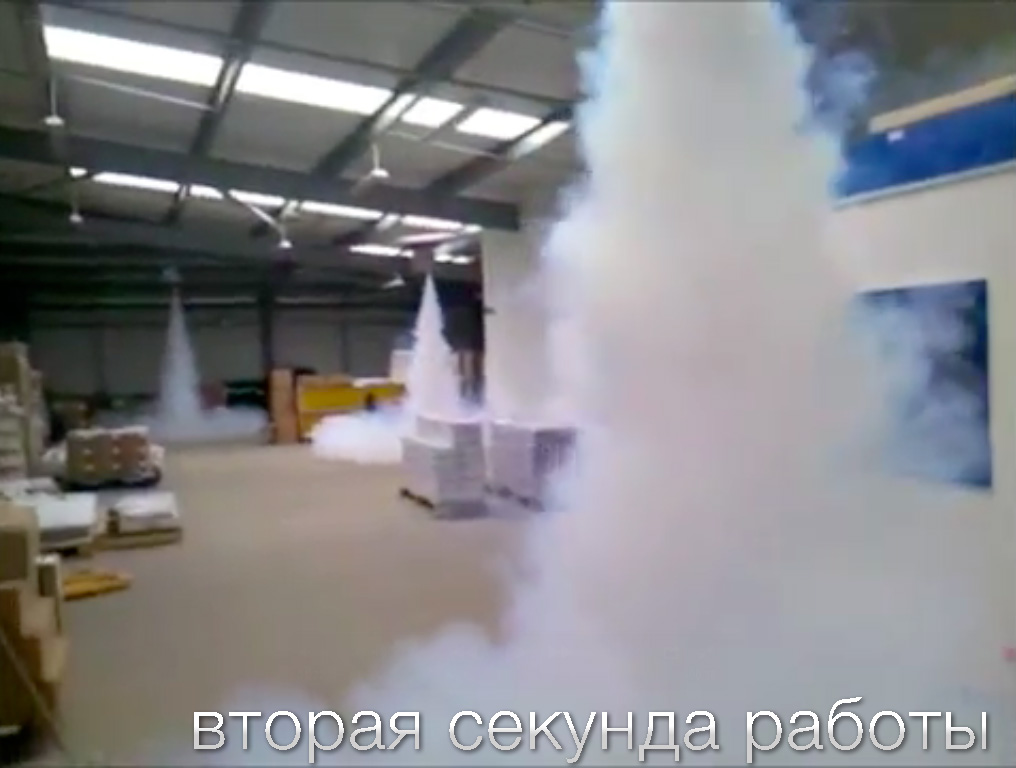
Security smoke being released in a warehouse

Security smoke is a thermally generated white fog, aimed at inhibiting intruders from accessing items to steal, much used in the storage of high-value goods, and recommended by police and insurers. It consists of glycol or glycerine mixed with distilled water, which vaporises and then condenses in the air.

== History ==
The market for using security smoke as a theft prevention tool came about because of an increase in the ability of thieves to circumvent existing physical security measures, often by simply raising the level of violence utilised to gain entry. Burglar alarms often have a delay of several minutes before police or private security are able to respond, meaning a well organised criminal has a period of time in which to enter and take what they like. Closed-circuit television and recording devices have been nullified as thieves routinely hide their identities. The security smoke market developed as an alternative security method, designed not to deter entry, but to prevent loss if a thief did gain access.

The first security smoke system was designed, manufactured and installed by Concept Engineering in 1974 to protect gold bullion in specialised vaults. In 1993 Concept launched the Smoke Screen range, the first commercial security smoke system to be designed and manufactured under ISO 9000.

== Composition of the smoke ==
A smoke "simulant", usually a glycol or glycerine mixed with distilled water, is vaporised and then condensed in free air to produce the distinctive smoke-like effect. The particles produced are on average 0.2-2.0 micrometres in diameter, meaning that the fog settles very slowly (and therefore has excellent longevity). This also means that residue and contamination is highly unlikely.

== Applications ==
Security smoke systems have been employed in a wide variety of industries, including banks, jewellers, retail premises, cash-handling chains, offices and private homes. Often businesses have turned to security smoke systems when other, more traditional, security methods have failed to prevent repeated break-ins and stock loss. It is estimated that as of January 2010 there are over 100,000 premises using security smoke systems in the UK.

=== Protecting high-value products ===
Security smoke systems have been successfully used to protect high-value items from opportunistic smash and grab style raids, for example jewellers' window displays. Major retailers, such as Aurum Holdings – owner of Mappin & Webb, Goldsmiths and Watches of Switzerland – have installed security smoke systems and have seen a dramatic decrease in losses from such break-ins.

=== Cash handling chains ===
Security smoke machines have been successfully used in protecting personnel and currency during the delivery and collection of cash. The introduction of a portable security smoke generator was awarded best new physical product at IFSEC 2009, providing cash-carriers with a high-level of protection against an increased risk during out of hours cash deliveries.

== Endorsement by crime prevention organisations ==
Guidelines from the Association of Chief Police Officers approve security smoke devices, and the ACPO Secured by Design accreditation scheme endorses certain manufacturers of security smoke systems. UK insurers also recommend security smoke as an approved method of reducing stock loss and deterring break-ins.

== Safety considerations ==
One of the primary concerns raised is the possibility of contamination of premises, stock and personal possessions by the generated fog. Independent tests performed by the UK Atomic Energy Authority and Molecular Profiles Ltd (on behalf of Concept Smoke Screen Ltd) have shown that well-installed, properly maintained security smoke systems leave no residue, and some security smoke installers offer a guarantee of this. Alternative concerns suggest that the smoke can cause some intruders to panic and put staff at risk. To minimise this risk, a great deal of care is taken in selecting where the smoke generators are installed. Security smoke now has its own European standard EN50131-8, which specifically states that it must not be used in such a way as to create a mantrap.

Another safety consideration is that the ejection nozzle of the fog machine does not become blocked. Some products incorporate an audible alarm in the event of nozzle blockage.
