= Pounamu Pathway =

The four locations of the Pounamu Pathway

The Pounamu Pathway is a $34.5 million New Zealand tourism venture, launched in 2020 by the Māori hapū or subtribe Te Rūnanga o Ngāti Waewae, intended to create four linked visitor experience centres on the West Coast of the South Island. The visitor centres will tell stories of the West Coast's early Māori history and the importance of pounamu or greenstone.

== Plan ==
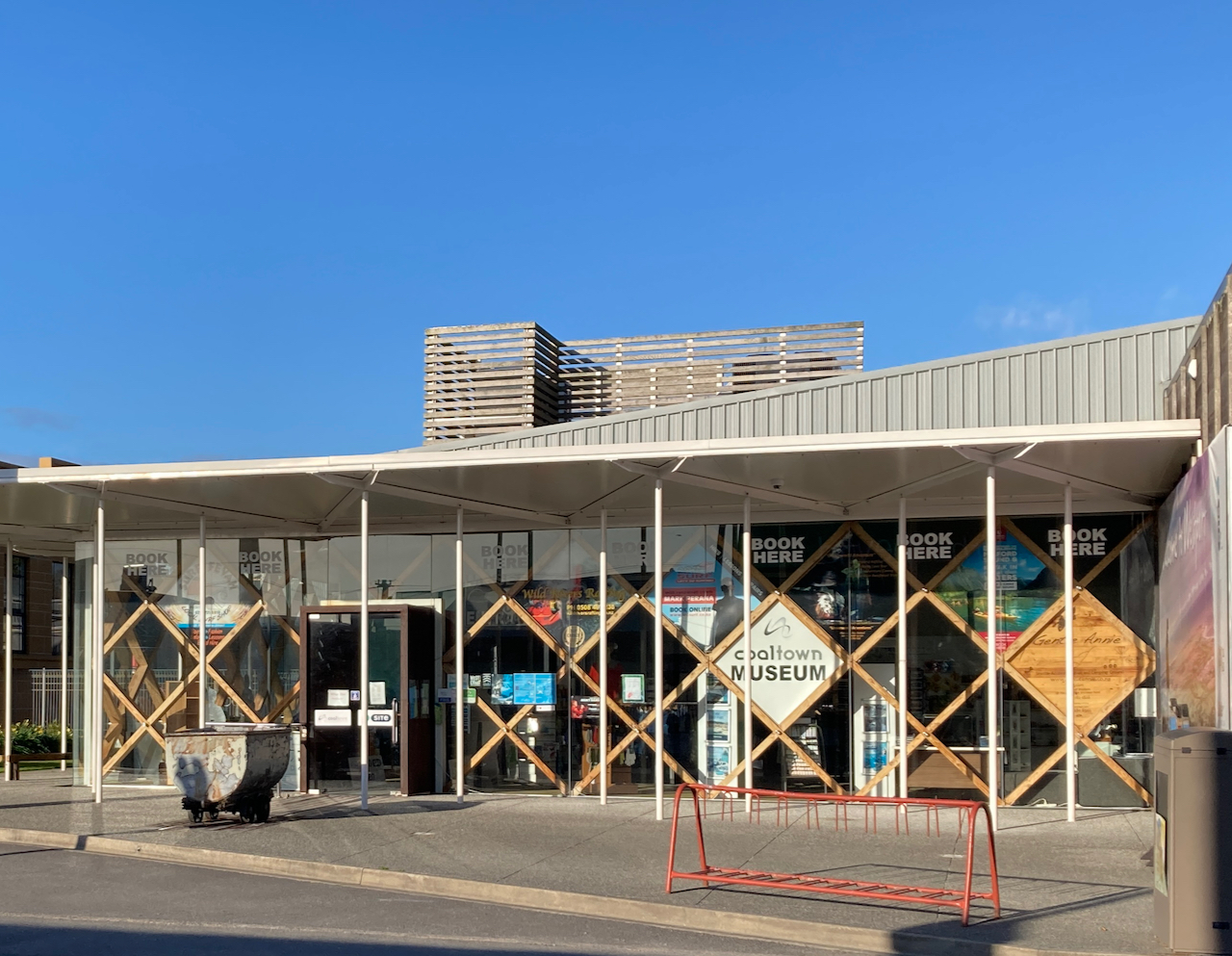
Coaltown Museum, Westport

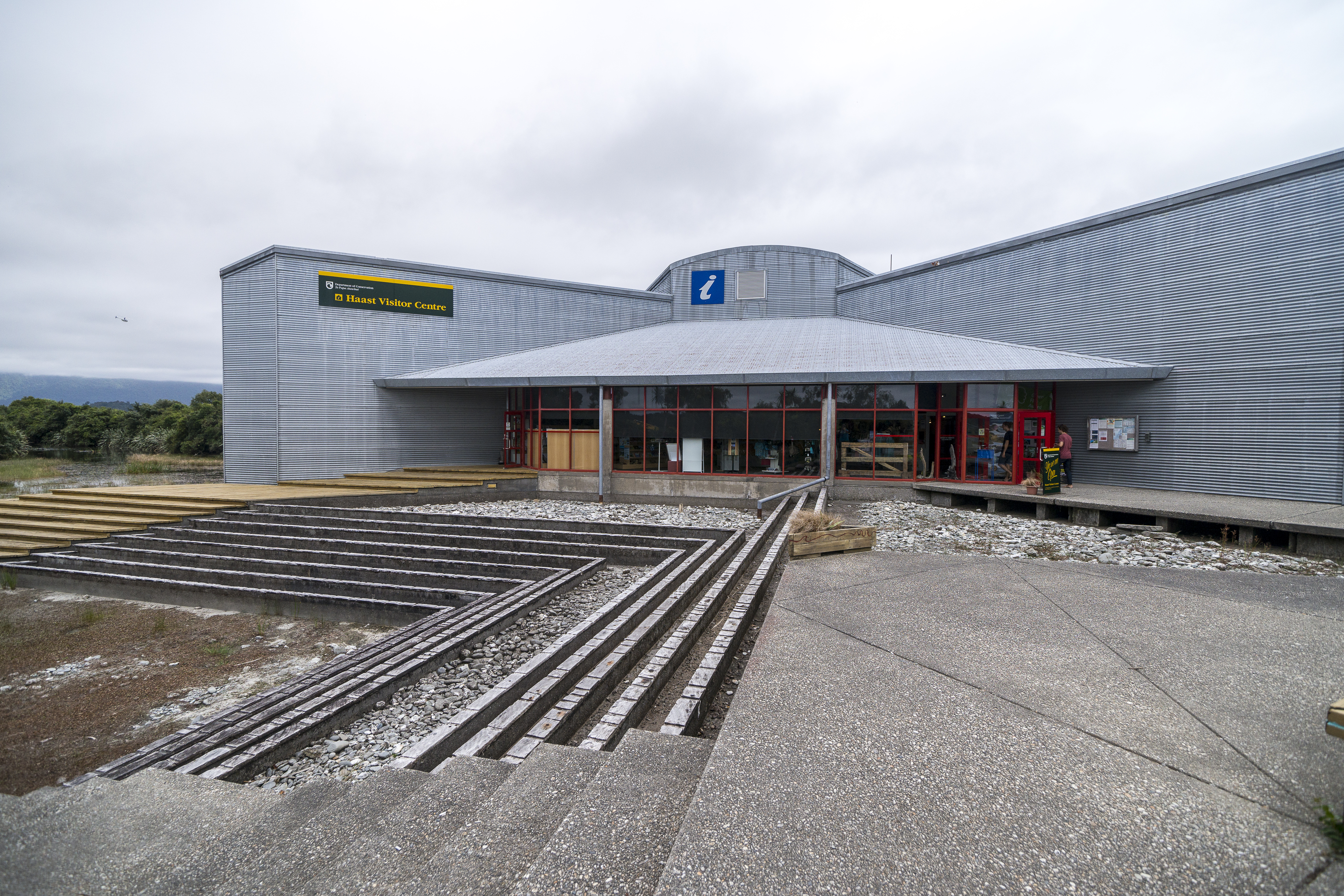
Department of Conservation visitor centre at Haast

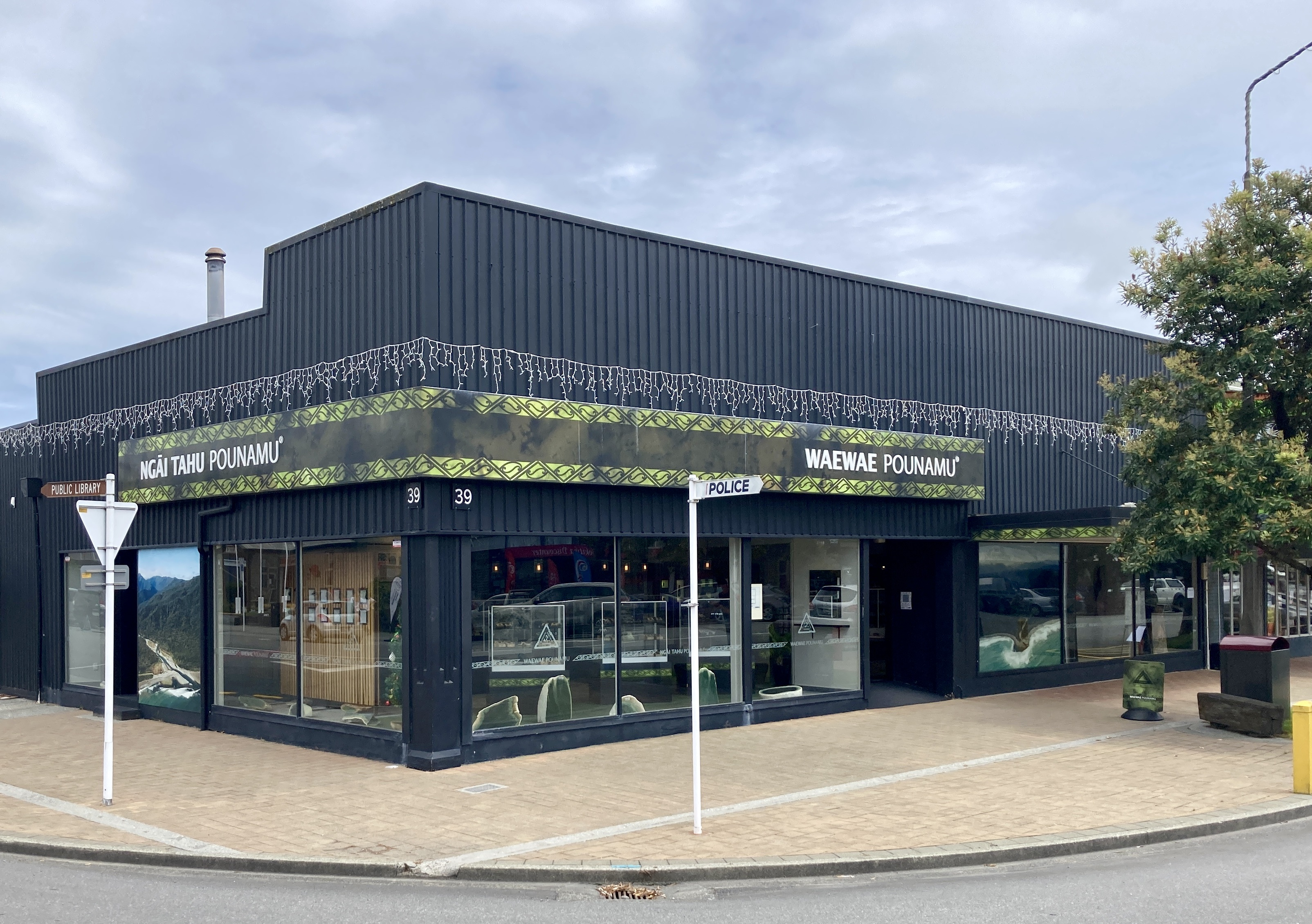
Waewae Pounamu, Hokitika

The Pounamu Pathway (Māori: Te Ara Pounamu) takes its name from pounamu or greenstone, a type of jade unique to the West Coast and highly valued by Māori for tools, weapons, and ornaments. Planning for the project began on 21 January 2019, in a meeting attended by 36 representatives of councils, heritage organisations, museums, Development West Coast, and iwi. The participants identified the Māori history of the West Coast as something missing from visitor experiences: tourism had focussed on Pākehā stories of gold, coal, and forestry. At this point multiple organisations along the West Coast had prepared individual applications for funding from the Provincial Growth Fund (PGF) totalling $70 million, but the participants were told that these would achieve nothing, and to develop a single cohesive regional plan instead.

The Pounamu Pathway concept was to use immersive digital technology in four "experience centres" or "hubs", in Westport, Greymouth, Hokitika, and Haast. It would initially be aimed at domestic tourists, and ultimately international tourism when this restarted after the COVID-19 pandemic. Although Bruce Bay was considered a key part of the Māori story of the West Coast, this was not considered a good place to attract tourists. The project would consist of:

- Redevelopment and rebranding of the Coaltown Museum and i-SITE tourist information centre on Palmerston Street, Westport
- A new building in Greymouth near the railway station, on land owned by Mawhera Incorporation and leased back to the project
- Demolition of the Waewae Pounamu building on Weld Street, Hokitika, and building a National Pounamu Centre in its place
- Redevelopment of the current Haast Visitor Centre run by the Department of Conservation

More than fifty jobs were expected to be created by the building and operation of the visitor centres. Development West Coast contributed $10,000 towards a funding application by the hapū Te Rūnanga o Ngāti Waewae to the PGF. The group budgeted the project at $34.5 million, of which $15 million would come from Ngāti Waewae and other stakeholders, and $19.5 million from the PGF. They suggested $12.9 million already allocated from the PGF to Westland Dairy and $3 million to the Williams Hotel Group could be redirected to the Pounamu Pathway instead. The Ngāti Waewae proposal was successful, receiving $NZ17.87 million from the PGF in June 2020, and the project was formally launched on 16 June 2020 at Arahura Marae.

== Implementation ==
The Pounamu Pathway project is run by the company Te Ara Pounamu Ltd (TAPL), owned by the two West Coast hapū of Ngāi Tahu: Te Rūnanga o Ngāti Waewae (60%) and Te Rūnanga o Maakawhio, representing Ngāti Māhaki (30%). MBIE's Provincial Development Unit, which oversaw allocation of the Provincial Growth Fund, insisted that Development West Coast take a 10% shareholding to represent the wider West Coast community. The majority share of Ngāti Waewae reflected the fact that three of the hubs were in their rohe or ancestral territory. The company's directors, appointed by the government, are chairman Tony Williams (Williams Hotel Group), Wally Stone (Ngāi Tahu Holdings, founder of Whale Watch Kaikōura), and Lisa Tumahai (chairwoman of Ngāi Tahu). Wellington-based Wētā Workshop was chosen to lead the design process, supported by the Westport-based game development studio CerebralFix. Te Rūnanga o Makaawhio chairman Paul Madgwick said the hubs would be "of Te Papa quality", and in addition there would be "a network of storytelling sites the length of the Coast."

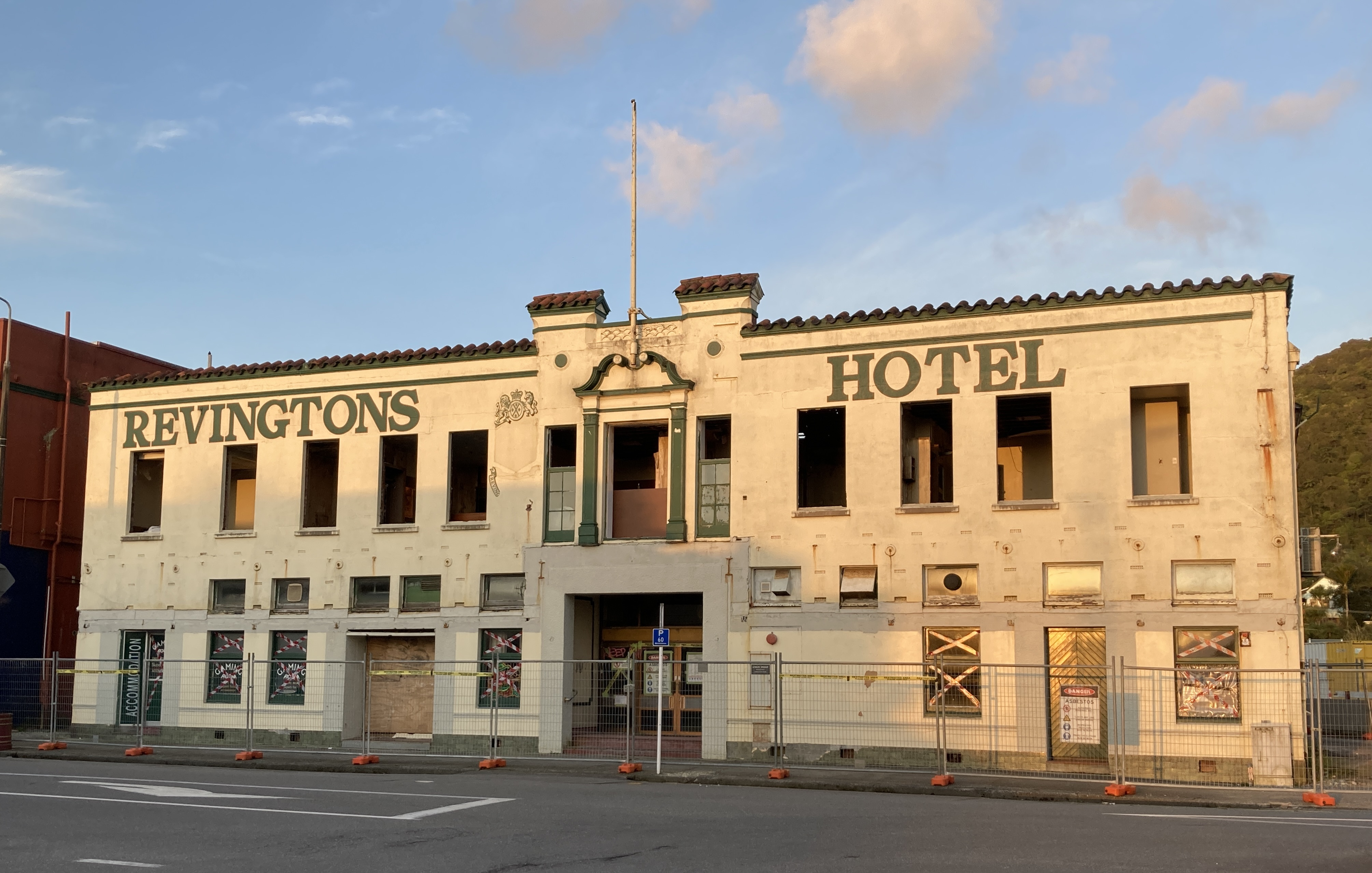
Revingtons Hotel in September 2020

In November 2020, Penny Bicknell was appointed head of the project. She had previously been the West Coast advisor of the Provincial Development Unit, and had analysed the project proposal and recommended it be funded. Bicknell described the Pounamu Pathway as her "baby" and said she had helped it succeed in its funding application. She disclosed her conflict of interest before applying for the chief executive role at Te Ara Pounamu, and at that point was removed from PDU duties relating to the project.

All four hubs were initially intended to be finished by 2023. A year later that had changed: the pathway would "open progressively from the end of 2023."

The Coaltown redevelopment was supposed to be completed in late 2021 or early 2022. Buller District Council had agreed to transfer $150,000 of funding for Coaltown Museum to TAPL, beginning in July 2021 and continuing for three years. In June 2021 TAPL told the District Council it was not yet ready to take over the running of the museum. Bicknell asked the council to extend the contract for another year, citing planning delays.

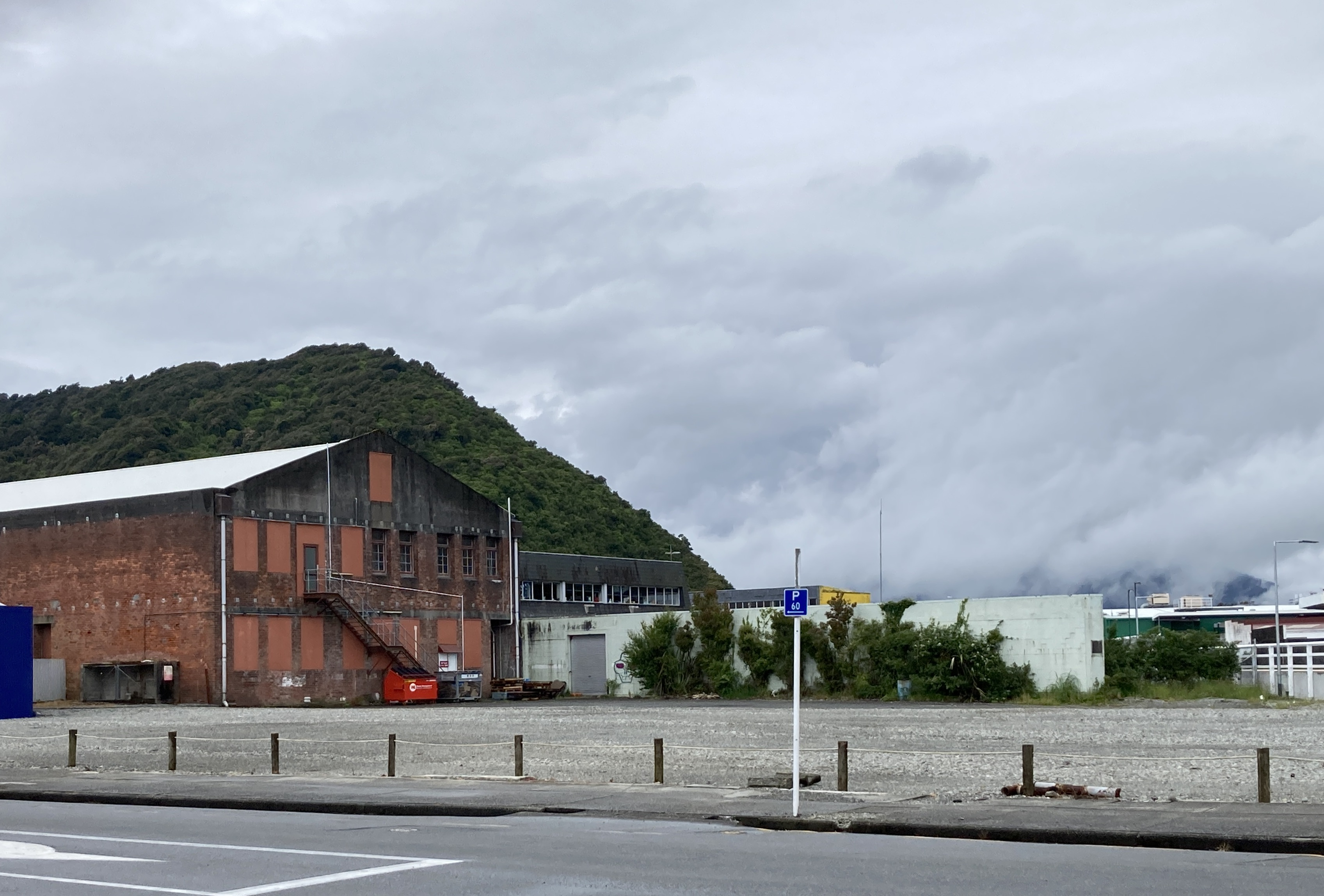
Hotel site after demolition in October

The redeveloped Haast visitor centre was expected to open in the second half of 2021, but by August work had yet to begin. Bicknell resigned from the Pounamu Pathway project in August 2021. In November 2021 construction of the Westport and Haast hubs was deferred until after summer 2021–22.

In September 2021 Ngāti Waewae and Ngāti Māhaki formed a joint venture called Pokeka to buy the site of the recently demolished derelict Revingtons Hotel in central Greymouth to house a Discovery Centre, one of the Pounamu Pathway hubs. The plan for the single-storey building included a café with mezzanine and a glass frontage on Tainui Street. The building would be funded by the two rūnanga and leased long-term to TAPL (90% owned by the same rūnanga) when completed. Work on the hub was planned to begin in early 2022.

In late 2021 Mayor of Buller Jamie Cleine and West Coast-Tasman MP Damien O'Connor expressed concerns about the project: they asked TAPL chair Tony Williams for details of the sale of the Revingtons site (there being a perceived conflict of interest over rental), what each director was being paid, why the West Coast community was not being informed of the project's progress, and why key milestones has been missed. Williams replied that Government funders had raised no concerns, the reputation and potential of the project could be damaged, and it should be treated with more respect.

The Greymouth site opened in December 2023, and the Westport centre opened in February 2024.
