= Lake Onslow =

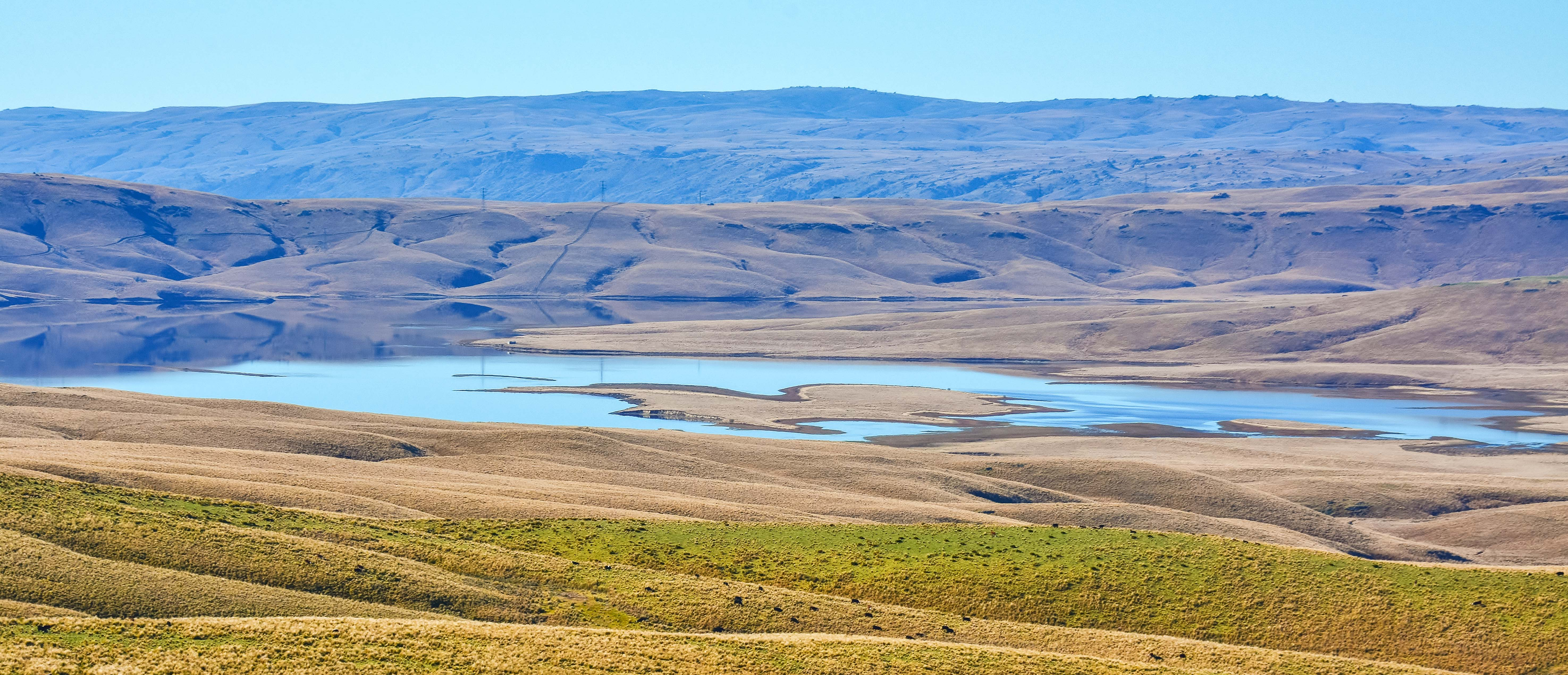
- Lake Onslow in May 2014

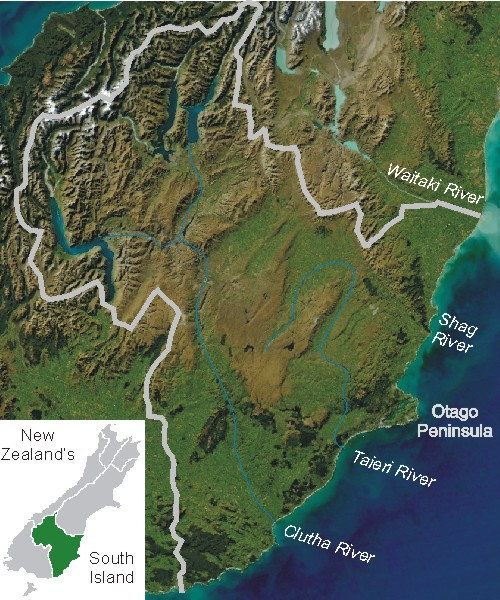
- Location within Otago peninsula
- Location: Otago, South Island
- Coordinates: 45°33′S 169°37′E
- Type: reservoir
- Primary inflows: Teviot River
- Primary outflows: Teviot River
- Basin countries: New Zealand
- Surface elevation: 700 m (2,300 ft)

Lake Onslow is a man-made lake east of Roxburgh and south of Alexandra in the Otago region of New Zealand. It lies 700 m (2,300 ft) above sea level. It was formed in 1890 by the damming of the Teviot River and Dismal Swamp, with a new dam built in 1982 that raised the lake level by 5 m (16 ft). It has been considered as the site for a pumped-storage hydroelectricity project.

== History ==
Lake Onslow first formed in 1890 when a dam was built that flooded the Dismal Swamp; the Teviot River flowed through the swamp. The water from this lake was used for mining, irrigation and hydroelectricity. In 1982, a new and higher dam was built that raised the lake level by 5 m (16 ft); the old dam is now drowned. The water usage rights jointly sit with Pioneer Energy (formerly the Otago Central Electric Power Board) and the Teviot Irrigation Company.

In 2019, the Interim Climate Change Committee proposed that the lake be used for a pumped hydro-storage system to provide backup electricity generation in dry years. The project had first been considered by hydrologist Earl Bardsley of the University of Waikato since 2002 and proposed in 2005. In July 2020, Minister of Energy Megan Woods announced that the New Zealand government would fund a detailed feasibility study of the plan. If progressed, the scheme would be the biggest infrastructure project in New Zealand since the 1980s, employ an estimated 3500 to 4500 people, and take four to five years to build and a further two years to fill. One option could be 5 TWh of storage and a 1.2 GW power station, equivalent to half a year of full production.

If the project goes ahead it will completely drown and submerge a small scroll plain with its swirling and migrating meanders (formerly known as Dismal Swamp). The scroll plain is a miniature example of the nearby Taieri Scroll Plains and has formed because of the low and decreasing gradient of the stream valley due to slow progressive tectonic back-tilting of the catchment.

In March 2023, the government estimated the cost of the storage project at $15.7 billion. In December 2023, the Energy Minister in the new National-led government, Simeon Brown, announced the axing of the pumped hydro scheme, saying, "This hugely wasteful project was pouring money down the drain at a time when we need to be reining in spending and focussing on rebuilding the economy and improving the lives of New Zealanders".

A consortium called the Clutha Pumped Hydro Consortium has taken on the project and in March 2026 the Minister for Infrastructure issued a decision to refer the project to the Fast-track approvals process via the Fast-track Approvals Act 2024. The consortium is expecting to attract international venture capital. Notable consortium members include former MP David Parker and business executive Keith Turner.

== Climate ==
Climate data for Manorburn Dam (Note: Manorburn Dam is located approximately 20 kilometres (12.4 mi) north of Lake Onslow.), elevation 746 m (2,448 ft), (1928–1977)
Month	Jan	Feb	Mar	Apr	May	Jun	Jul	Aug	Sep	Oct	Nov	Dec	Year
Record high °C (°F)	29.7 (85.5)	33.9 (93.0)	26.7 (80.1)	23.3 (73.9)	16.9 (62.4)	14.4 (57.9)	12.3 (54.1)	17.8 (64.0)	20.0 (68.0)	25.3 (77.5)	25.8 (78.4)	26.7 (80.1)	33.9 (93.0)
Mean maximum °C (°F)	25.4 (77.7)	25.8 (78.4)	23.0 (73.4)	19.3 (66.7)	14.3 (57.7)	11.0 (51.8)	8.8 (47.8)	11.5 (52.7)	14.7 (58.5)	19.2 (66.6)	21.5 (70.7)	23.3 (73.9)	27.0 (80.6)
Mean daily maximum °C (°F)	18.3 (64.9)	18.7 (65.7)	16.4 (61.5)	12.9 (55.2)	8.6 (47.5)	5.0 (41.0)	3.5 (38.3)	6.2 (43.2)	9.6 (49.3)	12.7 (54.9)	14.7 (58.5)	17.0 (62.6)	12.0 (53.6)
Daily mean °C (°F)	12.0 (53.6)	12.3 (54.1)	10.5 (50.9)	7.5 (45.5)	3.8 (38.8)	0.8 (33.4)	−1.1 (30.0)	1.3 (34.3)	4.4 (39.9)	7.1 (44.8)	8.9 (48.0)	11.0 (51.8)	6.5 (43.8)
Mean daily minimum °C (°F)	5.8 (42.4)	5.8 (42.4)	4.5 (40.1)	2.1 (35.8)	−1.0 (30.2)	−3.5 (25.7)	−5.6 (21.9)	−3.7 (25.3)	−0.8 (30.6)	1.4 (34.5)	3.0 (37.4)	5.0 (41.0)	1.1 (33.9)
Mean minimum °C (°F)	0.2 (32.4)	−0.4 (31.3)	−2.0 (28.4)	−3.2 (26.2)	−6.6 (20.1)	−10.5 (13.1)	−13.4 (7.9)	−12.3 (9.9)	−6.6 (20.1)	−4.2 (24.4)	−3.2 (26.2)	−0.5 (31.1)	−14.5 (5.9)
Record low °C (°F)	−2.8 (27.0)	−2.5 (27.5)	−4.7 (23.5)	−6.0 (21.2)	−10.6 (12.9)	−15.6 (3.9)	−16.9 (1.6)	−18.6 (−1.5)	−9.4 (15.1)	−6.1 (21.0)	−5.7 (21.7)	−4.6 (23.7)	−18.6 (−1.5)
Average rainfall mm (inches)	56.5 (2.22)	43.2 (1.70)	50.0 (1.97)	46.4 (1.83)	42.7 (1.68)	34.1 (1.34)	24.0 (0.94)	23.9 (0.94)	29.6 (1.17)	42.4 (1.67)	47.6 (1.87)	51.9 (2.04)	492.3 (19.37)
Source: NIWA
