= Interim Climate Change Committee =

The Interim Climate Change Committee (or ICCC) is a ministerial advisory committee created by the New Zealand Government in mid–April 2018 to explore how New Zealand transitions to a net zero emissions economy by 2050. The Interim Committee was superseded and replaced by an independent Climate Change Commission under the Climate Change Response (Zero Carbon) Amendment Act in November 2019.

== Mandates and functions ==
The Interim Climate Change Committee is modeled after the United Kingdom's Committee on Climate Change, an independent advisory body that advises the UK Government on whether it is meeting its climate change mitigation goals. The purpose of the ICCC is to provide independent analysis on issues identified in the Government's "Terms of Reference" that will be passed to the Climate Change Commission. The Terms of Reference for the ICCC are:

- How surrender obligations could best be arranged if agricultural methane and nitrous oxide emissions enter into the New Zealand Emissions Trading Scheme, and
- Planning for the transition to 100% renewable electricity by 2035.

In addition, the ICCC will explore issues such as how to transition to 100 percent renewable electricity generation by 2035 and reducing New Zealand's carbon emissions under the terms of the Paris Agreement. It will consult with key stakeholders and hand over its research and analysis to an independent Climate Change Commission under the Climate Change Response (Zero Carbon) Amendment Act in May 2019.

== Membership ==
On 17 April 2018, the Minister for Climate Change Issues James Shaw announced the membership of the ICCC. The ICCC's Chair is Dr David Prentice, the CEO and managing director of Opus International Consultants Limited. Other members include:

- Lisa Tumahai, Deputy Chair of the ICCC and Kaiwhakahaere of Te Rūnanga o Ngāi Tahu
- Dr Harry Clark, an agricultural greenhouse gas expert
- Dr Keith Turner, formerly CEO of Meridian Energy
- Dr Jan Wright, who used to be Parliamentary Commissioner for the Environment
- Dr Suzi Kerr, knows about economics of climate change policy and emissions trading.

== History ==
The ICCC officially came into existence on 1 May 2018. While the ICCC shares the same facilities as the Ministry for the Environment, it operates independently of the Ministry and has its own information management system. The opposition National Party's climate change spokesperson Todd Muller expressed support for the committee but criticised Minister Shaw's position to look into agriculture when the science to reduce ruminant emissions had not yet been refined. He also expressed unease about increased taxation of farmers and regional New Zealand. The business lobby group Business New Zealand welcomed the formation of the ICCC. Meanwhile, the agricultural lobby groups DairyNZ and Federated Farmers also welcomed the establishment of the ICCC but stressed that the agricultural sector should not bear the full burden of any increased taxation or regulations.

On 1 June 2018 the ICCC updated its Work Programme with the Minister for Climate Change Hon James Shaw and further clarified its Terms of Reference.

In 2019, the ICCC proposed that Lake Onslow in the South Island's Otago region be used for a pumped hydro-storage system to provide backup electricity generation in dry years. In July 2020, Minister of Energy Megan Woods announced that the New Zealand government would fund a detailed feasibility study of the plan. If progressed, the scheme would be the biggest infrastructure project in New Zealand since the 1980s, employing between 3500 and 4500 people, and take four to five years to build and a further two years to fill.

In November 2019, the ICCC was replaced by the Climate Change Commission.
