= Climate Change Commission =

Crown entity in New Zealand

- He Pou a Rangi

Agency overview
- Formed: 2019
- Preceding agency: Interim Climate Change Committee
- Jurisdiction: New Zealand
- Headquarters: Wellington
- Agency executive: Dr Rod Carr, Chairperson
- Website: www.climatecommission.govt.nz

The Climate Change Commission (Māori: He Pou a Rangi) is an independent Crown entity that advises the New Zealand Government on climate change policy and monitors the government's progress towards New Zealand's emission reduction goals within the framework of the Climate Change Response (Zero Carbon) Amendment Act . The Commission was established as the successor to the Interim Climate Change Committee following the passage of the Zero Carbon Act in November 2019.

== Mandates and functions ==
The Climate Change Commission advises the New Zealand Government on policy to reduce carbon emissions in line with New Zealand's 2050 emission reduction and adaption goals. It also monitors and reports on government progress against the 2050 target (via emissions budgets and emission reduction plans), the adaptation plan and primary sector commitments.

Specific policy the commission provides advice on includes the emissions budgets, emission reduction plan, Emissions Trading Scheme settings and changes to the 2050 target. The Climate Change Minister may also request the commission to provide advice on other matters. When providing advice, the commission by law must consider currently available scientific knowledge, existing and anticipated technology, economic impacts, the circumstances (social, cultural, environmental and ecological), distributional impacts, the crown-Māori relationship, te ao Māori and responses by other parties to the Paris Agreement.

== Leadership ==
Since its inception, the Climate Change Commission has been chaired by Rod Carr, a former chair and non-executive director of the Reserve Bank of New Zealand and a former vice-chancellor of the University of Canterbury. In December 2024 Climate Change Minister Simon Watts announced that from February 2025 Carr would be replaced by former Governor General Patsy Reddy. Other members include:

- Lisa Tumahai, deputy chairperson of the Commission, former deputy chairperson of the ICCC, and Ngāi Tahu leader
- Dr Harry Clark, an agricultural greenhouse gas expert and former member of the ICCC
- Dr Judy Lawrence, former coordinating lead author with the Intergovernmental Panel on Climate Change (IPCC)
- Felicity Underhill, energy specialist (from December 2024)
- Devon Maclean, forestry and conservation advisor (from December 2024)
- Dr Nicola Shadbolt, chairperson of Plant & Food Research and former director of Fonterra and Transit New Zealand.

Former members include James Renwick, climate change scientist and lead author on three IPCC assessment reports, and Catherine Leining, climate change mitigation policy adviser and former civil servant. Renwick and Leining were replaced by Felicity Underhill and Devon Maclean from December.

Jo Hendy is the Climate Change Commission's chief executive. She was previously with the secretariat of the Interim Climate Change Committee (ICCC) and is a former director of research and analysis for the Parliamentary Commissioner for the Environment.

== History ==
=== Formation ===
The Climate Change Commission was established as the successor to the Interim Climate Change Committee (ICCC) in November 2019 by the Climate Change Response (Zero Carbon) Amendment Act. The organisation was tasked with developing an evidence-based plan for New Zealand to fulfil its climate change goals within the framework of the Zero Carbon Act.

On 24 April 2020, Climate Change Minister James Shaw asked the Climate Commission Change Commission to review New Zealand's emission reduction target under the Paris Agreement, focusing on New Zealand's methane and carbon commitments.

In mid-May 2020, Climate Change Commission Chair Rod Carr criticised the 2020 New Zealand budget as insufficient for fulfilling New Zealand's carbon neutral goals. However, Carr welcomed the budget's commitments towards research, forestry, improving bush and wetlands, tightening the New Zealand Emissions Trading Scheme, rail and home insulation.

=== First report ===
On 31 January 2021, the Climate Change Commission released its draft advice for the first three emission budgets and the first emissions reduction plan. The report proposed phasing out petrol-powered cars, accelerated renewable energy generation, reducing the number of cows, and growing more native forests to meet New Zealand's carbon neutral goals by 2050. Chairman Carr defended the advice as ambitious but claimed it was realistic and advocated "immediate and decisive" action. Prime Minister Jacinda Ardern claimed that the impact of the proposed reforms would not be an economic burden.

In response, the Automobile Association's spokesperson Simon Douglas and Z Energy chief executive Mike Bennetts said that more investment was needed to encourage people to use electric vehicles including charging stations and cheaper prices. Gasfitters and plumbers also expressed concern that a proposed ban on new gas installations from 2025 would hurt their economic livelihood and careers. The coal industry also expressed concerns about the Commission's plan to phase out fossil fuels by 2050.

==== Final advice ====
On 9 June 2021, the Climate Commission issued its final advice to the government for the emissions budgets and first emission reduction plan following consultation with the public. The report recommended the reduction of animal numbers at farms, no new household gas connections by 2025, and shifting to electric vehicles within the next decade in order to reduce greenhouse emissions. Prime Minister Ardern and Climate Change Minister James Shaw endorsed the Climate Commission's report. On 14 June, the Government announced that it would introduce subsidies to make electric cars cheaper while raising the price of new petrol and new diesel vehicles. Beginning in July 2021, subsidies for new electric and hybrid vehicles will be up to NZ$8,625 (£4,360) and NZ$3,450 (£1,744) for used cars.

In response to the policy announcement, EV City owner David Boot said that it would boost demand for electric cars while expressing concern about the need for educating electric car users. Motor Trade Association chief executive Craig Pomare claimed that the rebate would not be enough to encourage motor users to make the switch to electric cars, while Federated Farmers national president Andrew Hoggard expressed concerns about the lack of electric vehicle alternatives for farmers and tradespersons, advocating a waiver for farmers. On 16 July 2021, the farmers advocacy group Groundswell NZ organised a nationwide Howl of a Protest campaign across 57 towns and cities to protest the government's new regulations.

=== Carbon credits ===
On 12 March 2024, the Climate Change Commission recommended that the New Zealand Government reduce the number of carbon credits for polluters to buy following four failed auctions in 2023.

=== 2025-2026 emissions target reductions ===
In early December 2025, RNZ and Newsroom reported that the Sixth National Government had rejected all of the commission's recommendations to strengthen New Zealand's 2050 targets for methane and carbon emissions. The government had earlier announced that it would reduce the 2050 methane reduction target from 24–27% to 14–24%. In addition, the government rejected the commission's advice to raise the target for carbon dioxide and other long-lived gases from a 2050 net zero target to a 2050 net-negative target, including international shipping and aviation emissions in New Zealand's emissions reduction targets, and the commission's advice to keep lowering emissions after 2050.

In mid July 2026, the Climate Change Commission expressed concern that New Zealand could miss its 2050 climate reduction targets unless the government made more efforts to reduce the country's agricultural and methane emissions over the next two years. The commission also recommended switching to low-emissions technologies to reduce household energy bills. It also noted that New Zealand's climate pollution had reduced over time but expressed concern that the government had reduced the country's agricultural emission targets.

== See also ==
- Climate Change Committee – the UK entity on which the Climate Change Commission was based
- Climate change in New Zealand
