= Keith Turner =

Keith Turner may refer to:

- Keith Turner (businessman), New Zealand businessman
- Keith Turner (motorcyclist) (born 1946), former Grand Prix motorcycle road racer from New Zealand
- Keith Turner, participant in the 2006 Harris County, Texas hate crime assault
