= Rod Carr (administrator) =

New Zealand businessman and administrator

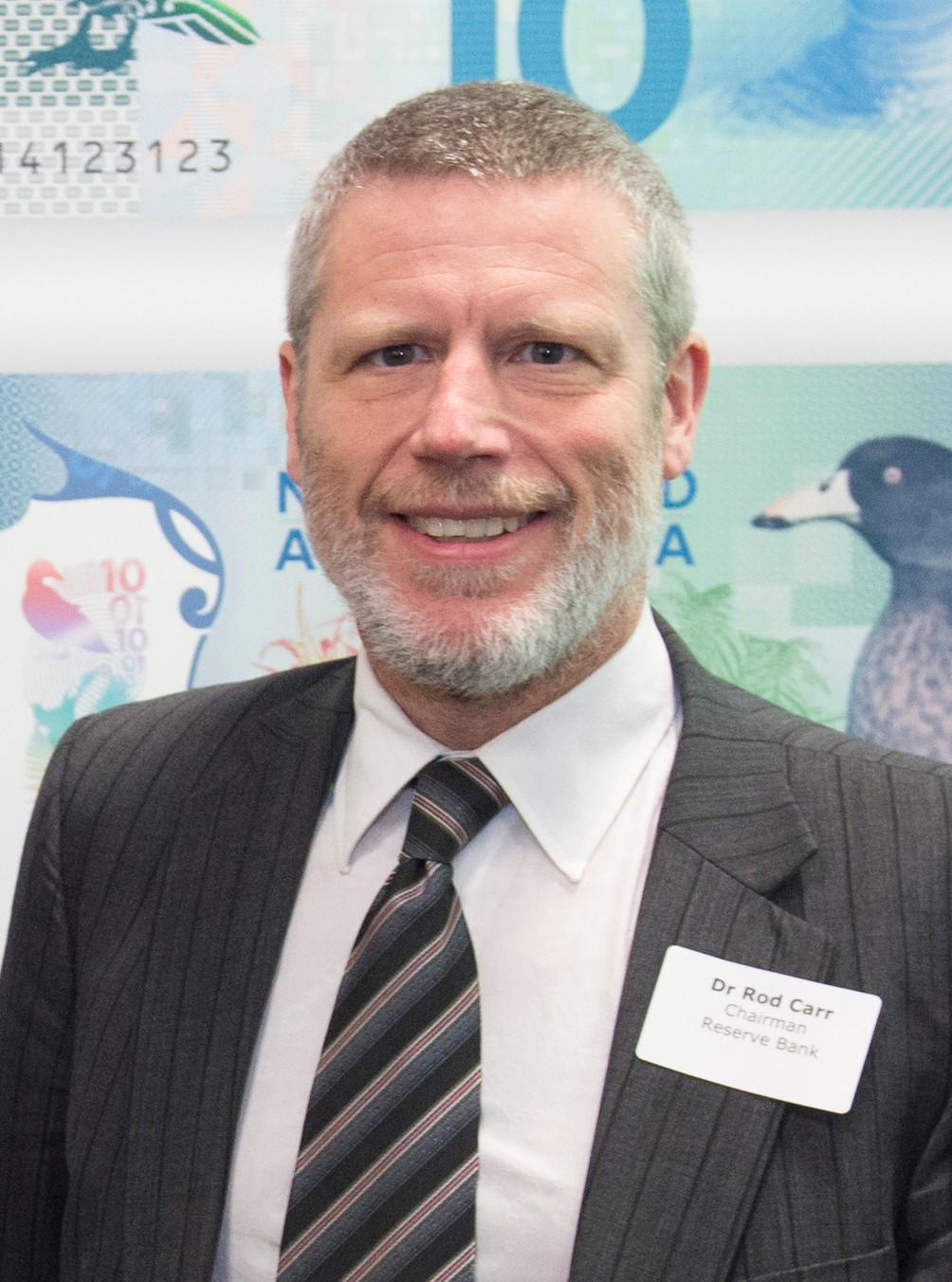
- Born: 1958 or 1959 (age 67–68)
- Education: University of Pennsylvania
- Awards: NZ Hi-Tech Awards 'Company leader of the Year'
- Scientific career
- Workplaces: Reserve Bank of New Zealand, University of Canterbury
- Thesis: Strategic choices, firm efficacy and competitiveness in the US life insurance industry (1997)
- Doctoral advisor: J. David Cummins

Roderick Marshall Carr (born 1958 or 1959) is a New Zealand businessman and administrator. He retired from his position as vice-chancellor of the University of Canterbury in 2019 and has been a chairman of the board of the Reserve Bank of New Zealand, and a director of Lyttelton Port Company, Taranaki Investment Management and Canterbury Employers’ Chamber of Commerce. In 2019, Carr was appointed as Chair-designate for the Climate Change Commission and was confirmed in that role for five years following the passing of the Climate Change Response (Zero Carbon) Amendment Act. Carr has been partially sighted and legally blind since birth.

== Banking ==
Carr has held executive positions at the Bank of New Zealand and the National Australia Bank and multiple roles at the Reserve Bank of New Zealand.

== Jade Software Corporation ==
Running Jade Software Corporation was Carr's first exposure to the technology industry.

== University of Canterbury ==
Carr served as vice chancellor at the University of Canterbury from 2009 until January 2019. During his tenure, student numbers (EFTS) decreased from 15,624 in 2009 to 14,070 in 2018, his last full year as vice-chancellor. Over the same period, academic staff numbers remained steady at approximately 770 FTE. The university's total revenues increased from $284 million to $380 million and net assets increased from $709 million to over $1.4 billion. Leading the university's recovery from the February 2011 Canterbury earthquake was a major focus for Carr. In his final report as Vice-Chancellor, he reflects on the recovery, noting that “a lot has changed – had to change – post-quake”, and acknowledges the $260 million capital contribution of the Crown to the wider $1.2 billion rebuild of the university.

== Climate Change Commission ==
=== Establishment ===
The Climate Change Commission is a Crown entity established to provide independent, evidence-based advice to the New Zealand Government to guide climate change for Aotearoa. On 8 October 2019 Carr was appointed Chair-designate to the commission to serve for five years in the role from the passing of the Climate Change Response (Zero-Carbon) Amendment Act 2019. Carr acknowledged that the commission would only have recommendatory powers over climate change policy, but will be able to offer advice that needs to be transparent, evidence-based and developed after consultation so that it "puts the Government of the day in the position to have the courage to make those tough choices and for the country to be carried with them." Climate Change Minister James Shaw said that the commission would have a crucial role to play in supporting New Zealand's transition to a low-emissions economy, and saw that Carr was the right person to "ensure that the Commission will be independent, analytical and credible." Carr signalled the need for change if New Zealand wanted to achieve its climate targets and that the goals of the commission had been received positively by two major sector groups Dairy NZ and the Petroleum Exploration and Production Association (PEPANZ).

=== Review of New Zealand's commitments under the Paris Agreement ===
On 23 April 2020, Shaw asked the commission to review the New Zealand Government's commitments under the Paris Agreement, noting that to inform this review, it was important for the commission to consult widely with "iwi/hapū/Māori, industry, technical experts, special interest groups, and sector leaders." Carr noted that the commission had a role in educating and developing awareness of climate change requiring a high level of engagement with the public as demonstrated in a series of public Zoom webinars he ran. Carr said it was like walking a tightrope aiming to keep politics out of the process while assuring the political leaders that the commission was with them. Instead, the commission's role was in providing advice about the direction of policy, while acknowledging that to reach a "climate-resilient, low-emissions Aotearoa requires more than advice...[and]...combatting climate change, meanwhile, requires transformational and fundamental change to our economy and our society." He stressed that on a per capita basis, New Zealand was one of the highest emitters of greenhouse gas in the world and changes were necessary in how people in the country lived their lives. There was a middle ground that required New Zealanders to set "ambitious but realistic targets, that we describe pathways which are plausible and credible, anchored in our reality, evidence-based, data-rich, and that we coach and encourage each other to play our part in what will be heroic action."

=== Response to National Climate Change Risk Assessment ===
Interviewed on 23 November 2020, Carr reiterated the need for New Zealanders to change the way they lived their lives if the concerns expressed in the first National Climate Change Risk Assessment are not responded to. He said that while it is important for the politicians to act based on science and reassure people about the options and confirm the need for urgent action, ultimately though "this is not going to happen if people feel alienated and intimidated – they're not going to participate actively if they don't see the upside as well as some of the challenges we will face if we don't move." He said he was impressed with the way some big businesses responded to the risks of climate change, and with regard to the agricultural sector, expressed:

"They are obviously anxious and concerned about how they sustain a viable business if they are unable to continue practices that they are familiar with. In the agricultural sector there is a growing awareness of the need for change, but also a concern about what is the nature of the change that is needed. I think the agricultural sector is highly innovative, I don't think they're in denial. For my money, New Zealand should be substantially increasing its investment in agriculture research."

To Carr, meeting the challenge of climate change required fairness and New Zealand as a wealthy, developed nation that had benefitted from their emissions in the past, had a responsibility to be a role model and encourage other nations to share the burden.

=== Advice for Consultation Documents 2021 ===
As the Climate Change Commission prepared to release draft consultation document suggesting emissions budgets to support New Zealand meeting its domestic emissions reduction targets of a "10 per cent reduction in methane emissions by 2030, a 24–47 per cent reduction in methane by 2050 and net zero all other emissions by 2050", journalist Marc Daalder noted that while Carr had expressed disappointment in the climate change action of the country he had also shared three possible ways that New Zealand could think about how to achieve its fair share of emissions reductions. According to Carr, it needed to be accepted that on a population basis New Zealand was responsible for 0.18 per cent emissions, while only making up 0.06 per cent of the world's population; that compared to the recommended fall of emissions by the IPCC of 45 per cent from 2010 levels by 2030, New Zealand was only projected to be 6 per cent below their 2010 levels; and that historically New Zealand was one of only a few industrial nations that had benefited from a high-emissions economy and should "reduce emissions to a greater degree than developing nations that haven't had those advantages." Carr also warned that just planting trees was not enough for New Zealand to reduce its emissions.

When the Draft Advice for Consultation document was released on 31 January 2021, Carr emphasised in his Letter from the Chair: "The climate science is clear, the direction of climate policy is laid out and the time for accelerated climate action is now." Carr later commented that the advice was "ambitious but realistic" and the same news item reported that the Report was welcomed by the Minister for Climate Change James Shaw who was confident that the suggestions from the commission could be implemented and that New Zealand would be able to "set an example to the rest of the world in terms of how to make a transition to a net-zero carbon economy." After the New Zealand Prime Minister, Jacinda Ardern said that the advice in the Report "sets out an achievable blueprint for New Zealand to become a prosperous, low-emissions economy", Carr urged the Government, the community and business and agricultural sectors to move quickly. In two interviews on Radio New Zealand, one with Kathryn Ryan, the other with Corin Dann, Carr clarified the process and timeline of the proposed changes.

The Climate Commission delivered its final advice to the New Zealand Government on 31 May 2021 and published it on their website on 9 June 2021. Carr said the advice indicated that "transformational and lasting change is both necessary and possible. The technology and the tools Aotearoa needs to reach its climate targets exist today. Our evidence shows climate action is affordable. Ināia tonu nei–the time is now." Prior to the release of the final advice, Carr had detailed in an opinion piece, the changes that needed to be made to transition to a "thriving, climate-resilient, low emission economy," but later told an agricultural climate change conference in Wellington on 1 June, that [farmers needed to] "clean up their practices or risk international punishment," to which one farmer responded: "the changes the commission suggested – dropping methane by 10 percent by 2030 – did not make financial sense for many farmers, so it would not happen."

=== Advice documents for the New Zealand Government 2023 ===
In April 2023, the Commission shared a draft document with proposed advice and recommendations for the New Zealand Government to consider if the country was to achieve the second emissions budget for 2026–2030. Carr acknowledged that there had been some "momentum from the Government's first emissions reduction plan" but there was a need to "broaden, strengthen, and accelerate action so the country can meet its climate change objectives." He confirmed that the purpose of the consultation process behind the preparation of the report had been to identify actions that were urgent and of the highest priority if New Zealand was achieve its 2026–2039 emissions budget and "meet its emissions reduction goals."

In his chair's message prefacing the report, Carr claimed that managing issues around land used for forest was necessary to reduce the risk of "slash, wildfires, storm damage, and diseased and dying trees" and to realise the effects this has had on Māori communities within the forestry sector. He suggested this was about "upholding Te Tiriti o Waitangi/The Treaty of Waitangi principles, the unique cultural, economic, social, and environmental considerations for tangata whenua, and the need for Iwi/Māori to play an integral part in any conversation about the future of forests." The chair's message concluded: "Investing in Iwi/Māori will give Aotearoa New Zealand the best chance to reach our 2050 climate change targets. Accelerating an understanding of mātauranga Māori and increasing collaboration with Iwi/Hapū will lead to more locally relevant and enduring climate change solutions."

Journalist Marc Daalder wrote that the report highlighted the need for more efficient consenting processes for projects to support infrastructure to build and support "renewable electricity generation" within upgraded distribution networks. The point is also made in this article, that because of the extensive planting of pine trees, the challenge is for the country to find "the appropriate balance of cuts to pollution verses carbon sequestration in trees." Carr is quoted as questioning the sustainability of continuing to plant trees to offset emissions from burning fossils fuels [because] "fossil fuels release carbon that has been buried for millions of years into the atmosphere...[a]... tree that absorbs that carbon for a century isn't the equivalent of not burning the fossil fuel in the first place." Kate Nicol-Williams from 1 News also noted that Carr had concerns about the government [rewarding] "sequestration in forests above gross emission reductions", and the advice to the government in addressing these concerns and other issues, was laid out later in the article with a list of the key recommendations to meet "2050 targets which include having net zero emissions of greenhouse gasses except organically caused methane and 24 to 47% less organically caused methane."

On Radio New Zealand with Kathryn Ryan, Carr acknowledged that New Zealand's emissions had "stabilised" and the challenge was to sustainably set in place a "downward trajectory of gross emissions." In this interview, Carr stressed that the current structure of the New Zealand Emissions Trading Scheme needed to change its approach from focussing mainly on sequestration to more rewarding "reducing gross emissions." In considering the degree to which New Zealand depends on electricity, Carr said that the "diversified portfolio of electricity generation" is beneficial to the country and will be effective with good funding, less bureaucracy and the expertise on the ground to make it happen. He concluded that the government is addressing some of the matters; the concern of the Commission is about the pace and urgency of implementation of the necessary changes.

Carr stepped down from the Commission in December 2024 being succeeded by Dame Patsy Reddy.

== Other roles ==
Carr is currently an independent director of the ASB Bank, a Trustee of Banks Peninsula Conservation Trust, and a member of the advisory group of Purpose Capital.

Academic offices
Preceded by Roy Sharp	Vice-Chancellor of the University of Canterbury; 2009–2019	Succeeded by Cheryl de la Rey
