= Tawana Kupe =

Zimbabwean academic

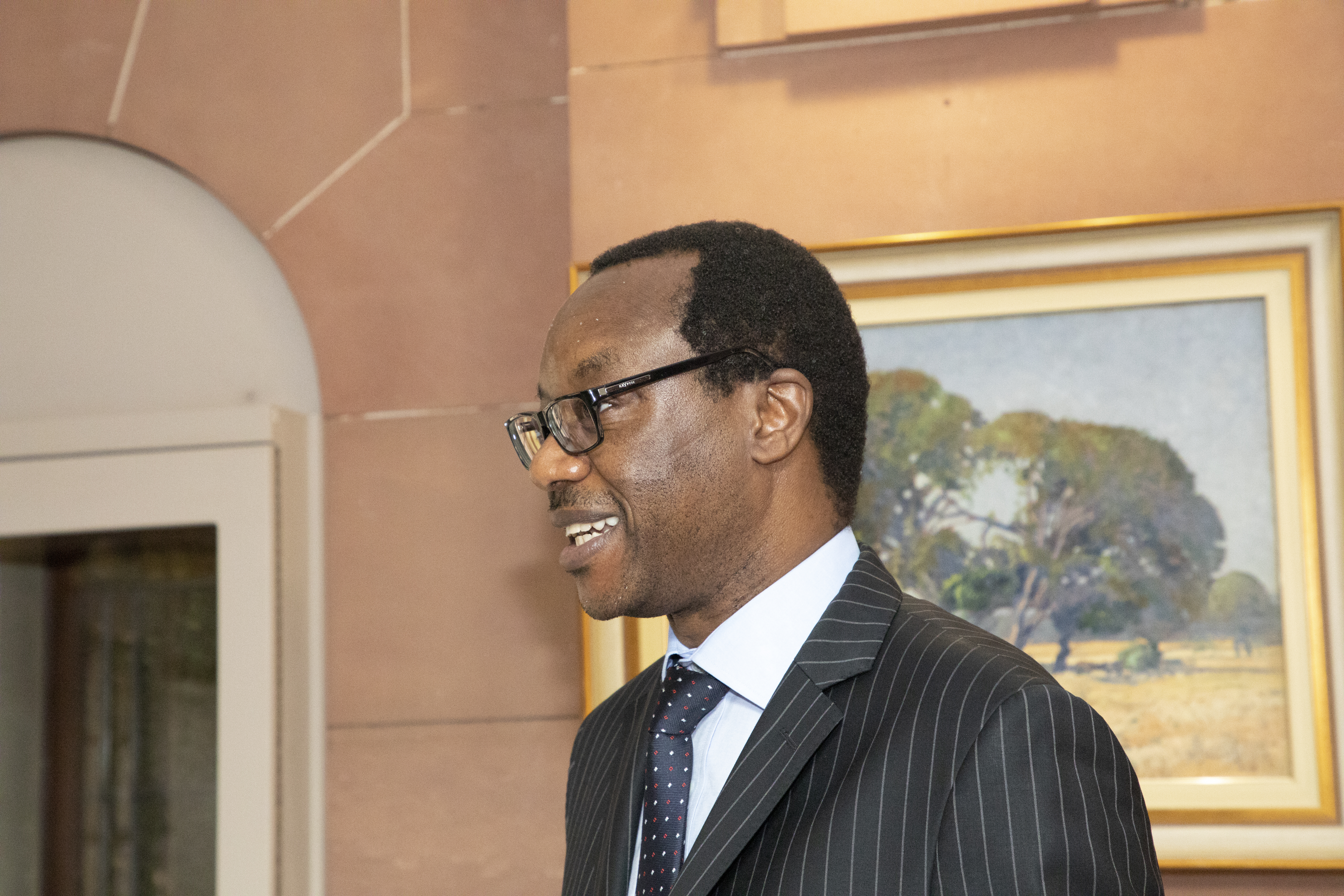
- Tawana Kupe in 2019

Vice-Chancellor and Principal University of Pretoria
- In office January 2019 – July 2023
- Preceded by: Cheryl de la Rey

Personal details
- Education: University of Zimbabwe; University of Oslo
- Occupation: Academic administrator Media studies professional
- Awards: Knight of the French Legion of Honour

Tawana Kupe is a Zimbabwean academic. He was the vice-chancellor of the University of Pretoria in South Africa. Prior to this appointment he held several senior positions at the University of Witwatersrand, including deputy vice-chancellor and vice-principal, where he also founded the Media Studies Department. He also lectured at Rhodes University. Before Rhodes, he worked in various academic capacities at the University of Zimbabwe.

== Life ==
Professor Kupe served as the executive dean of the Wits Faculty of Humanities for six years, between January 2007 and December 2012, after serving as the head of the then Wits School of Literature and Language Studies, and the founding Head of the Media Studies Department. Prior to joining Wits, Professor Kupe lectured at Rhodes University between 1999 and 2001. He joined Rhodes from the University of Zimbabwe, where he worked in various academic capacities from 1988, including as chairperson of the Department of English, Media and Communication Studies. He was announced as vice-chancellor in November 2018, replacing Cheryl de la Rey. Professor Kupe holds a BA Honours degree and Masters in English from the University of Zimbabwe, as well as a DPhil in Media Studies from the University of Oslo in Norway. In December 2019, Professor Kupe was awarded an honorary doctorate degree in humanities by Michigan State University (MSU) and by the University of Montpellier. Kupe was named a Knight of the French Legion of Honour for his contributions to interdisciplinary research and academic collaboration. University council announced Kupe's resignation from his position as vice-chancellor and principal of the University of Pretoria, effective July 2023.

== Controversy ==
In June 2023 Kupe unexpectedly resigned from his post as Vice-Chancellor of the University of Pretoria, 6 months before the end of his term. Local media reported that he had recently been cleared of sexual harassment allegations. It was subsequently revealed that Kupe had previously been found guilty of sexual harassment at the University of the Witwatersrand where he was given a final written warning.

== Current positions ==
- Chairperson for Africa – Australia-Africa Universities Network (AAUN), (2019-)

== Former positions ==
- Deputy Vice-Chancellor and Vice-Principal – University of the Witwatersrand
- Vice-Chancellor and Principal – University of Pretoria, South Africa (2019- 2023)

Academic offices
| Preceded by Cheryl de la Rey | Vice-Chancellor of the University of Pretoria; 2018–2023 | Succeeded by Themba Mosia (Interim) |
