= Felicity Underhill =

New Zealand energy industry professional

Academic background
- Education: Victoria University of Wellington, Brussels School of International Studies
- Thesis: Esi esi tasol : the Bougainvillean peace process, 1988-99 (2000)

Felicity Jane Curran Underhill is a New Zealand energy specialist, and has experience working in the oil, gas and hydrogen industries in Australia and New Zealand. In 2024 Underhill was appointed to the New Zealand Climate Change Commission.

== Education ==
Underhill is Māori, and affiliates to Ngāti Raukawa. Underhill has a Bachelor of Arts in political science from Victoria University of Wellington and a Master of Arts degree in internal relations and conflict resolution from the Brussels School of International Studies at the University of Kent. Her thesis was on the peace process in Bougainville.

== Career ==
Underhill has worked in the oil and gas industries in Australia and New Zealand for more than twenty years. She worked for Shell for ten years, and was then General Manager of Future Fuels at Origin Energy. Underhill worked on hydrogen production for Fortescue Future Industries (FFI), a part of the Fortescue mining company. She was Director East Australia and New Zealand for FFI, and led Fortescue's investigations into producing "green hydrogen" at Marsden point oil refinery. Underhill was director and deputy chair of the Australian Hydrogen Council.

In March 2024 she was appointed as a director of Channel Infrastructure, which operates New Zealand largest fuel import terminal. In December 2024 Underhill was appointed to the New Zealand Climate Change Commission, alongside forestry and conservation advisor Devon McLean, and new Chief Commissioner Patsy Reddy. Underhill was considered to bring expertise in decarbonisation of energy, and transport industries.
