= Nicola Shadbolt =

New Zealand farmer, academic and company director

Nicola Shadbolt ONZM
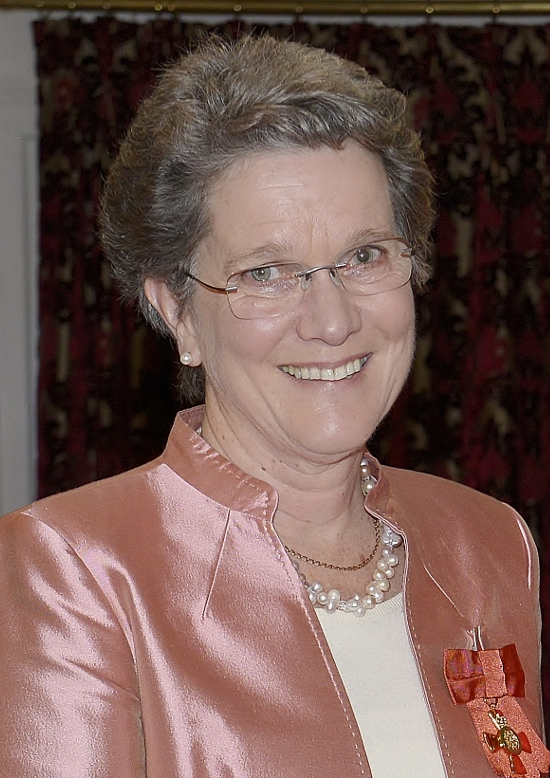
- Shadbolt in 2018
- Education: University of Canterbury
- Scientific career
- Fields: Agribusiness
- Workplaces: Massey University; Transit New Zealand; Fonterra

Nicola Mary Shadbolt ONZM is a New Zealand farmer, academic and company director. She is currently a professor of farm and agribusiness management at Massey University.

== Academic career ==
Shadbolt earned degrees from the University of Nottingham and Lincoln College (at that time a constituent college of the University of Canterbury) and a diploma from Massey University. Her master's thesis was titled Alternative management strategies and drafting policies for irrigated Canterbury sheep farms. Shadbolt worked at the Ministry of Agriculture and Fisheries and then in a variety of roles in government, agribusiness and consultancy before moving to Massey University, rising to full professor.

== Professional governance career ==
Shadbolt has held multiple public and private sector directorships. From 1994 to 2001, Shadbolt was on the board of Transit New Zealand. She held multiple roles, including director, within the Fonterra group of companies from 2009 to 2018.

On 19 August 2019 Shadbolt was appointed as Chair and Director of the Plant & Food Crown Research Institute. On 17 December 2019 Shadbolt was appointed as a member of the Climate Change Commission and she concluded this appointment in December 2022. On 1 July 2026 Shadbolt commences as a member of the Environmental Protection Authority board.

== Awards and honours ==
In 2017, Shadbolt won the rural section of the Westpac New Zealand Women of Influence Award, and in the 2018 Queen's Birthday Honours, she was appointed an Officer of the New Zealand Order of Merit for services to agribusiness.

== Selected works ==
- Schwendel, B. H.; Wester, T. J.; Morel, P. C. H.; Tavendale, M. H.; Deadman, C.; Shadbolt, N. M.; Otter, D. E. (2015). "Invited review: Organic and conventionally produced milk – an evaluation of factors influencing milk composition". Journal of Dairy Science. 98 (2): 721–746. doi:10.3168/jds.2014-8389. PMID 25497795.
- Garnevska, Elena; Liu, Guozhong; Shadbolt, Nicola Mary (2011). "Factors for successful development of farmer cooperatives in Northwest China". International Food and Agribusiness Management Review. 14 (4): 69–84.
- Clare, B.; Shadbolt, N.; Reid, J.; Trienekens, J. H. (2002). Supply base relationships in the New Zealand red meat industry: a case study. 5th International Conference on Chain and Network Management in Agribusiness and the Food Industry: Paradoxes in Food Chains and Networks. pp. 805–816.
- Shadbolt, Nicola; Martin, Sandra (2005). Farm Management in New Zealand. Oxford University Press.
- Hodgson, J.; Cameron, K. C.; Clark, D. A.; Condron, L. M.; Fraser, Tom; Hedley, M. J.; Holmes, Colin; Kemp, P. D.; Lucas, R. J.; Moot, D. J.; Morris, S.; Nicholas, Phillipa; Shadbolt, Nicola; Sheath, G. W.; Valentine, I.; Waghorn, Garry; Woodfield, D. R. (2005). "New Zealand's pastoral industries: efficient use of grassland resources". In Reynolds, S. G.; Frame, J. (eds.). Grasslands: Developments, Opportunities, Perspectives. Rome: Food and Agriculture Organization of the United Nations and Science Publishers. pp. 181–205.
