= Lisa Tumahai =

New Zealand iwi leader

Lisa Tumahai CNZM
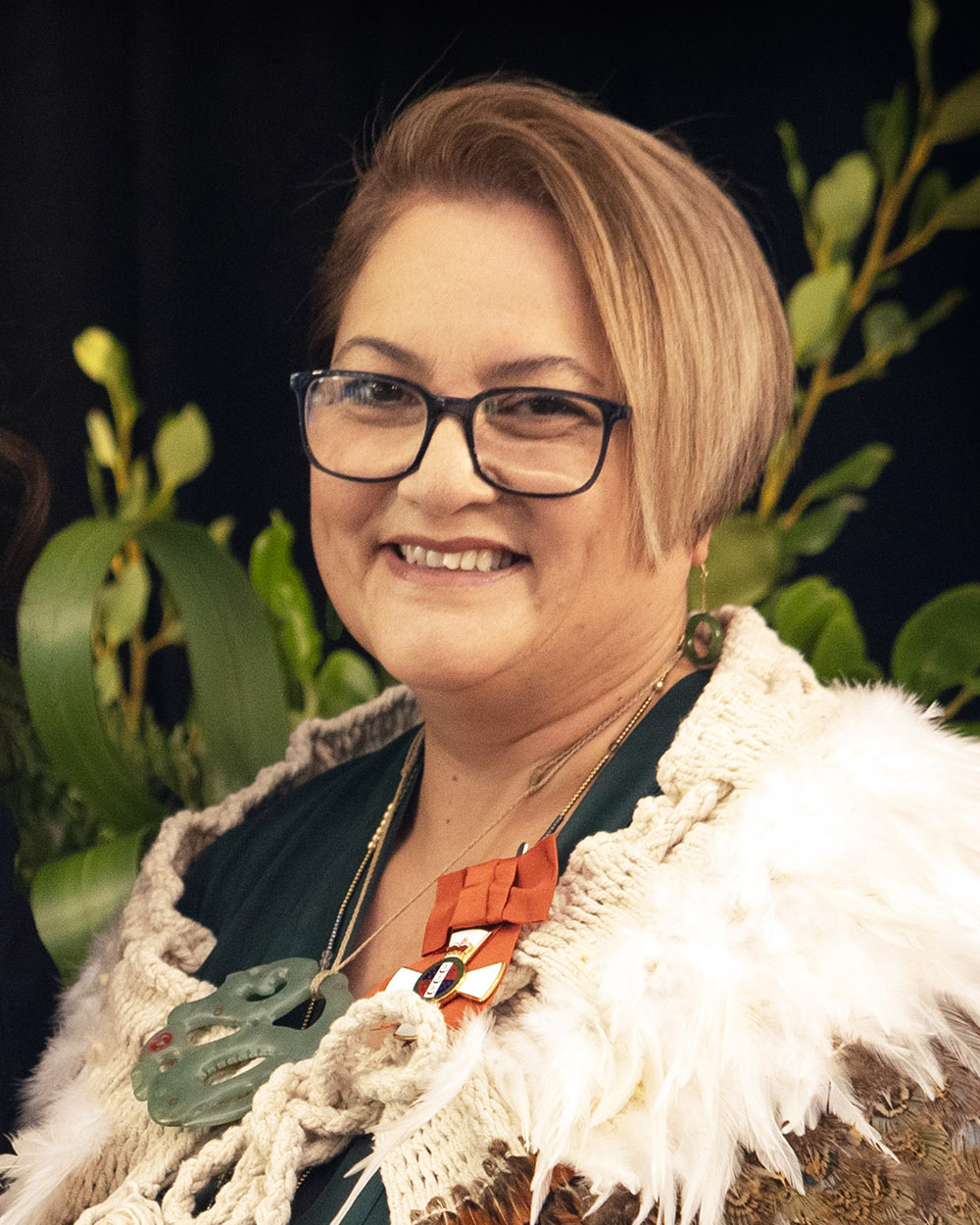
- Tumahai in 2024
- Born: Lisa Tauwhare; 1966 (age 59–60); Christchurch, New Zealand

Lisa Tumahai CNZM (née Tauwhare; born 1966) is a New Zealand iwi leader. She was the first female kaiwhakahaere (chairperson) of Te Runanga o Ngāi Tahu from 2016 to 2023.

Her other professional governance appointments include deputy chair of the Climate Change Commission, member of the University of Canterbury council, and member of the Environmental Protection Authority board.

== Early life and education ==
Tumahai is Māori and affiliates to the Ngāi Tahu, Tainui, Ngāti Hikairo, and Ngāti Kahungunui iwi. She is the fifth of six children, and was born in 1966; her parents were living in Bishopdale in Christchurch at the time. Tumahai left school with no qualifications, and worked in sewing factories and hospitality before taking a tourism course, followed by an administrative job. She then earned a Bachelor of Commerce from the University of Canterbury, followed by study at Stanford University Graduate School of Business.

== Professional governance career ==
Tumahai spent five years as deputy chair of Te Runanga o Ngāi Tahu before being appointed interim chair in 2016, taking over from Mark Solomon. She was the representative for Te Runanga o Ngati Waewae, having been elected to that role in 2003. Tumahai was then elected chair at elections the following year. She was reelected for another three-year term in 2020. Tumahai was the first female chair of the runanga, and served for six years. The runanga represents 70,000 people and manages over $1.8 billion of assets. During her period as chairperson,Tumahai worked to decentralise the governance of Ngāi Tahu, passing more control to the local runanga. She also improved the environmental performance of Ngāi Tahu operations, including having V8 jet boat engines converted to electric engines. Tumahai did not seek reelection in 2023, saying her "tank was dry".

Tumahai serves on the University of Canterbury council and the Waitangi National Trust and Development West Coast. She has also been on the board of the health and social services provider Te Poutini Waiora. Since its inception in 2019, Tumahai has been deputy chair of He Pou a Rangi, the Climate Change Commission. She was acting chair for a brief period between the departure of Rod Carr and commencement of Patsy Reddy's term as chair. In May 2026 she joined the Environmental Protection Authority board.

== Personal life and family ==
Tumahai is married with three children, and lives in Hokitika, on the West Coast of New Zealand.

== Awards and honours ==
In the 2023 New Year Honours Tumahai was appointed a Companion of the New Zealand Order of Merit for services to Māori development.
