= Cheryl de la Rey =

South African academic

Cheryl Merle de la Rey
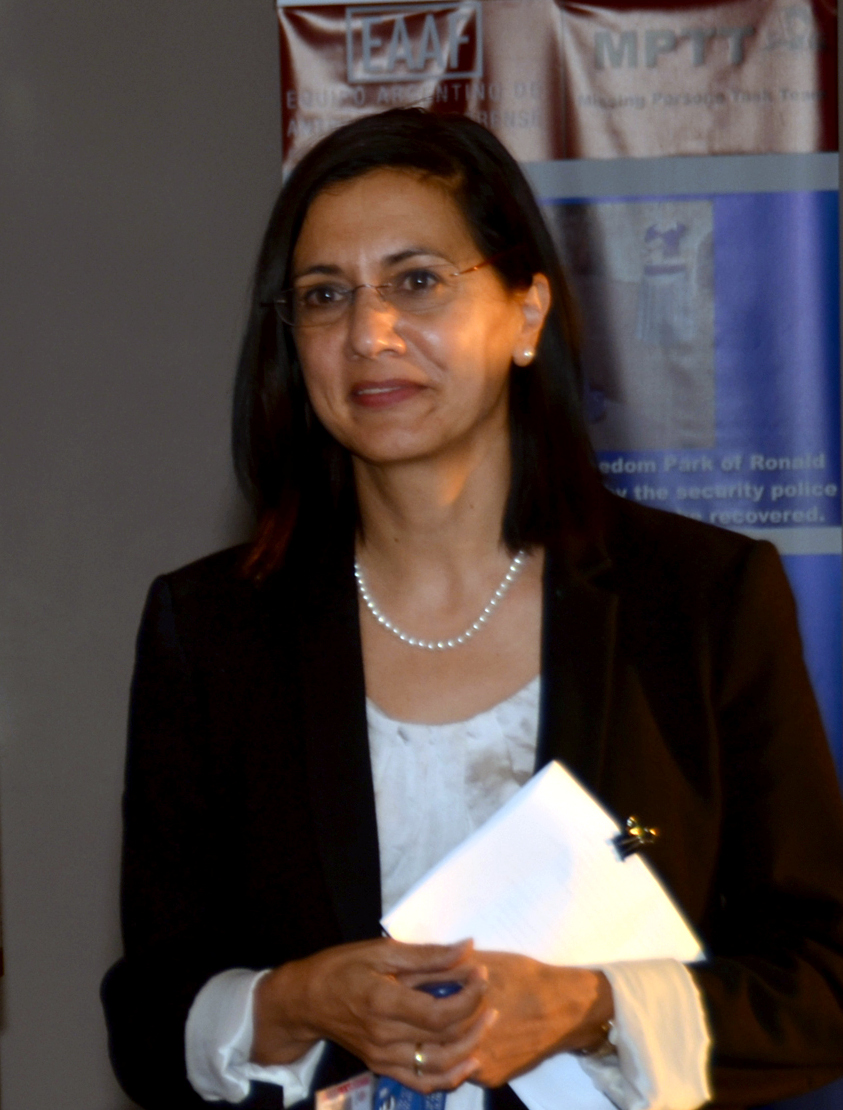
- de la Rey in 2012

8th Vice-Chancellor University of Canterbury
- Incumbent
- Assumed office 1 February 2019
- Preceded by: Rod Carr

12th Vice-Chancellor University of Pretoria
- In office 1 November 2009 – 31 December 2018
- Preceded by: Calie Pistorius
- Succeeded by: Tawana Kupe

Personal details
- Born: Durban, South Africa
- Spouse: Eldridge Johnson
- Education: University of Natal University of Cape Town

Professor Cheryl Merle de la Rey is a South African academic who, since 2019, has been vice-chancellor of University of Canterbury in New Zealand. She was formerly Vice-Chancellor of the University of Pretoria in South Africa.

== Early life and education ==
Professor Cheryl de la Rey attended the University of Natal, obtaining a Bachelor of Arts in 1983, Bachelor of Arts Honours in 1984 and Master of Arts in 1986, all cum laude. She is a qualified psychologist.

== Research and career ==
Professor De la Rey's research focused on race and gender, especially the construction of gender and gender-based violence.

A registered psychologist [by the Health Professions Council of South Africa], Professor De la Rey is a fellow of the Psychological Association of South Africa, a fellow of the Royal Society of South Africa and of the Academy of Science of South Africa.

Professor De la Rey spent time as Deputy Vice-Chancellor at the University of Cape Town before being named Vice-Chancellor and Principal of the University of Pretoria in November 2009, replacing Calie Pistorius.

In October 2020, De la Rey was the subject of a letter critical of an attempt by the University of Canterbury to review the work of Anne-Marie Brady concerning Chinese Communist Party influence in New Zealand.

Academic offices
Preceded by Calie Pistorius	Vice-Chancellor of the University of Pretoria; 2009–2018	Succeeded by Tawane Kupe
Preceded by Rod Carr	Vice-Chancellor of the University of Canterbury; 2019–present	Incumbent
