= Coaltown Museum =

Museum of coalmining in New Zealand

Coordinates: 41°45′14.6″S 171°35′55.1″E

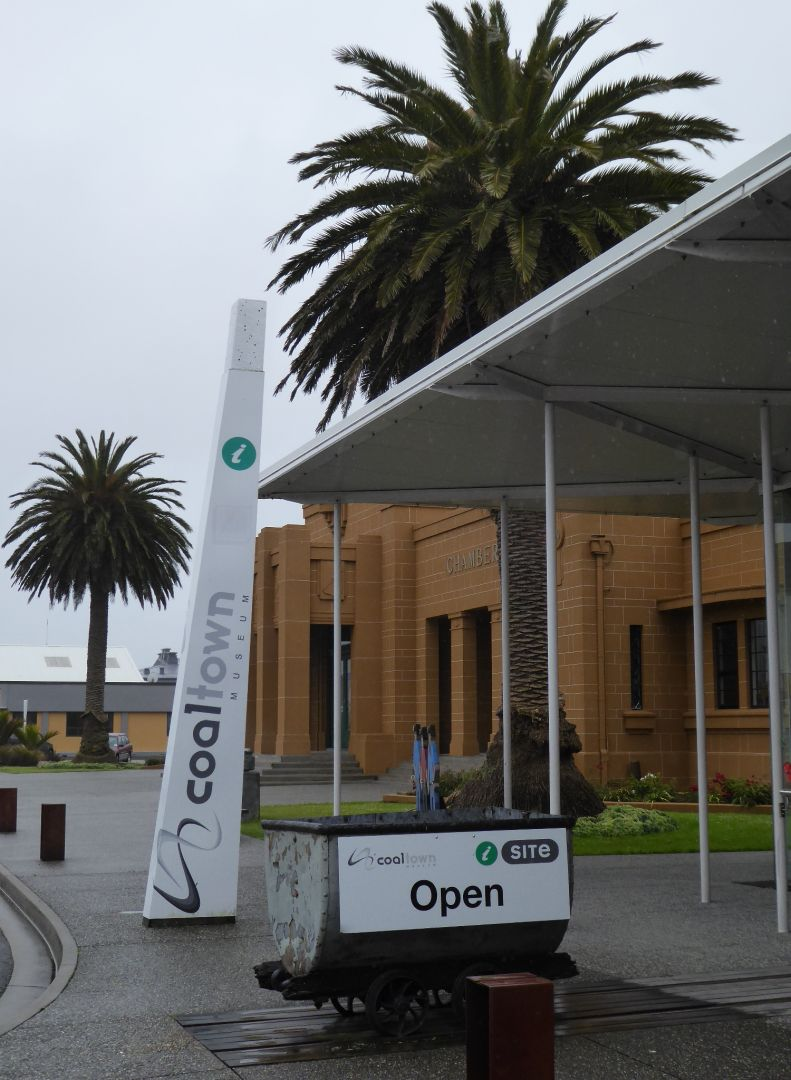
Entrance to Coaltown Museum

Coaltown Museum is a museum of coalmining, located in Westport on the West Coast of New Zealand.

== Building ==
The building housing the Coaltown Museum is located in a cultural hub on Palmerston Street. Designed by Boon Goldsmith Bhaskar Brebner Team Architects, the building won two awards in the 2013 New Zealand Institute of Architects Nelson/Marlborough regional awards: the public architecture award and the Resene colour award.

== Collection ==
The museum was opened in 2013, and holds displays on coal extraction and maritime history. The displays include an eight-ton coal wagon that was used at the Denniston mine; a simulated underground mine and a steam engine from the SS Mawhera. The museum also holds collections of photographs and objects related to mining on the West Coast.
