= Teviot River =

Coordinates: 45°32′S 169°19′E

Location
- Country: New Zealand

Physical characteristics
- Mouth
  - location: Clutha River

The Teviot River is a river in New Zealand, a tributary of the Clutha River.

== See also ==
- List of rivers of New Zealand
