= Judy Lawrence =

New Zealand climatologist

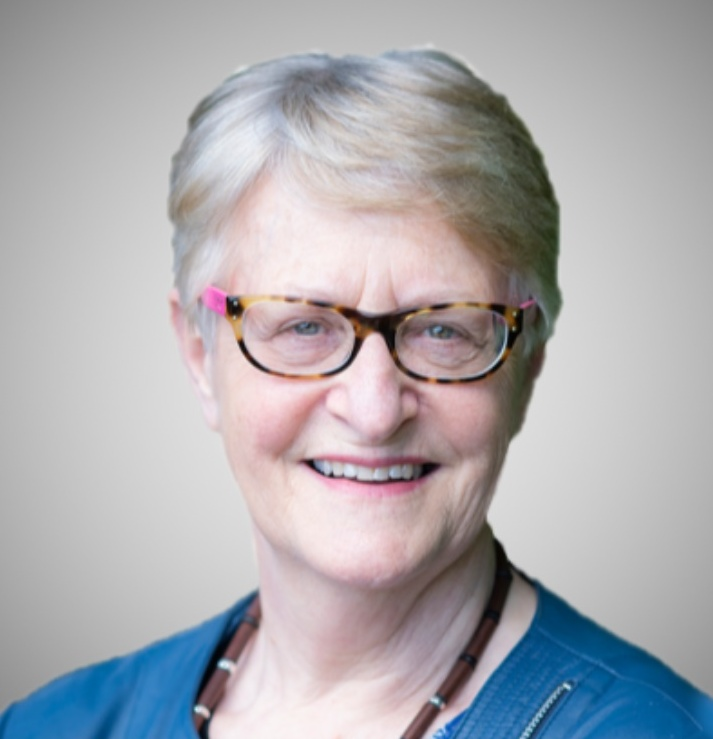
- Education: Victoria University of Wellington
- Scientific career
- Fields: Climate Change policy and adaptation
- Workplaces: Victoria University of Wellington
- Thesis: The adequacy of institutional frameworks and practice for climate change adaptation decision making (2015)
- Doctoral advisor: Amanda Wolf; Andy Reisinger
- Website: cms.wgtn.ac.nz/nzccri/about/staff/judy-lawrence

Judith Helen Lawrence is a New Zealand climate change policy and adaptation expert. She studies climate change, especially aspects of uncertainty, decision making under uncertainty and adaptation. She has linked academic work to everyday problems, and worked closely with stakeholders such as national and local authorities and water utility companies. She is the coordinating lead author for the IPCC Sixth Assessment Report Australasia Chapter.

Lawrence has made her studies and academic career at Victoria University of Wellington, New Zealand, where she now is adjunct professor in the School of Geography, Environment and Earth Sciences Climate Change Research Institute and the Antarctic Research Centre. She has also held senior government positions on climate change policy, science strategy, and water and land management practice.
