= Kathryn Ryan =

New Zealand radio journalist

Kathryn Ryan is a New Zealand radio journalist. Ryan initially trained as a teacher, completing a BA in education and history. She then worked managing a sports centre, and retrained as a journalist in her late 20s. She began her journalism career in Napier, working on the local newspaper The Daily Telegraph. In 1998, she moved to Wellington and joined Radio New Zealand as a senior reporter, and in 2000 became the political editor. In May 2006, she started hosting Nine to Noon, Radio New Zealand's morning news programme.

In 2015, Ryan was named International Radio Personality of the Year by the Association of International Broadcasters.
