= Development West Coast =

New Zealand charitable trust

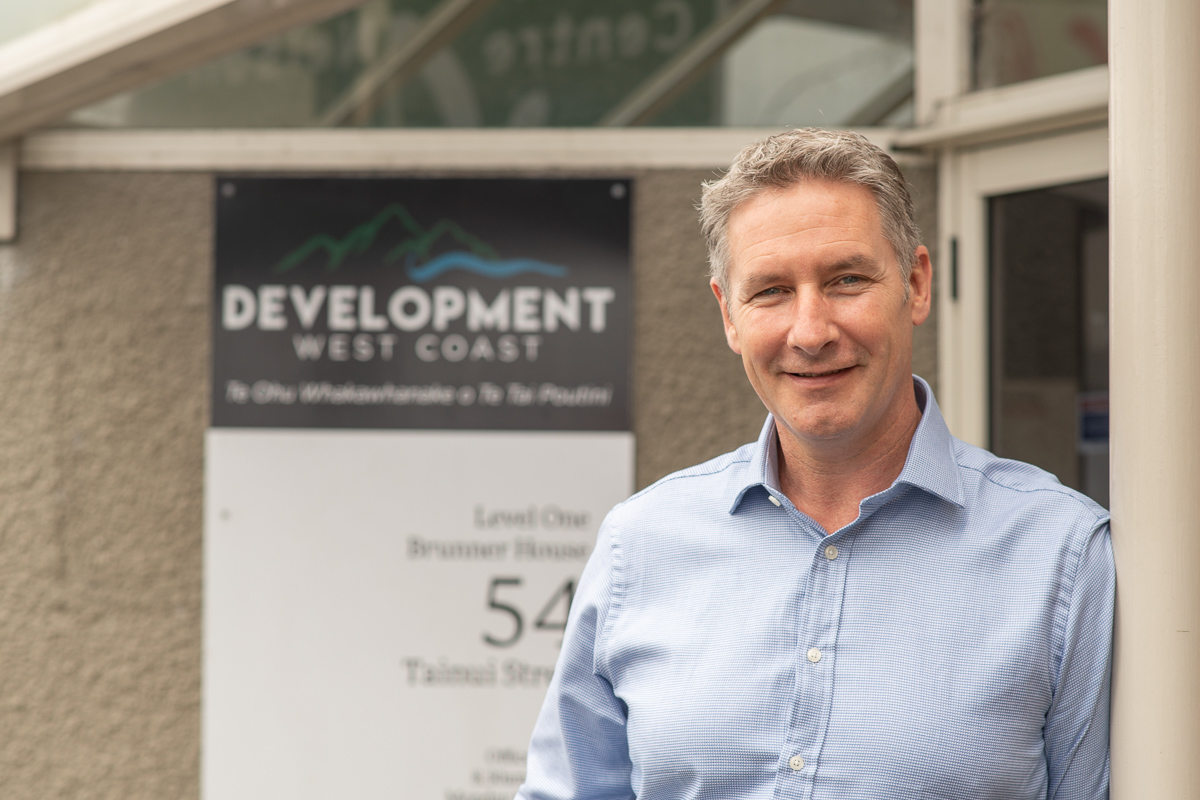
- Heath Milne in 2020
- Industry: Economic Development Agency
- Founded: 2001
- Headquarters: Greymouth, New Zealand
- Key people: Heath Milne (Chief Executive), Sam MacDonald (Chair)
- Revenue: 7,394,803 New Zealand dollar (2025)
- Total assets: 151,801,932 New Zealand dollar (2025)
- Number of employees: 19 (2025)
- Website: dwc.org.nz

Development West Coast (DWC) is a charitable trust that operates in the West Coast Region of New Zealand. DWC is the economic development agency and regional tourism organisation for the region.

== Origin ==
Development West Coast (was set up as a Charitable Trust in 2001 to manage, invest and distribute income from a fund of $92 million received from the Government. This fund was an adjustment package for the loss of indigenous forestry and the privatisation of much infrastructure on the West Coast in the late 1990s. DWC is governed by a Deed of Trust which specifies DWC's Objects - to promote sustainable employment opportunities; and generate sustainable economic benefits for the West Coast, both now and into the future..

== Finances ==
In the 2015–2016 financial year, Development West Coast approved 20 loans worth a total of $14.4 million; in 2016–2017 it loaned $12.3 million to 18 businesses. It returned a profit of $5.3 million, after running a deficit in 2015. It had 11.5 staff positions and the Chief Executive was Chris Mackenzie, on a salary of $223,000.

In 2021, in its 20th year, DWC's fund had grown from $92 million to $146 million. In 2019 it approved 80% of loan applications received, distributing $2.2 million, and gave $1.9 million to community projects. In the year ending March 2021, it issued $6.7 million in loans, distributed $3.5 million to the community, and made a $14.2 million net profit. It had 20 full-time staff under Chief Executive Heath Milne.

By March 2025, DWC had directly invested $208.2m into the West Coast economy since 2001 while maintaining the fund’s value at $149m.

== Projects ==
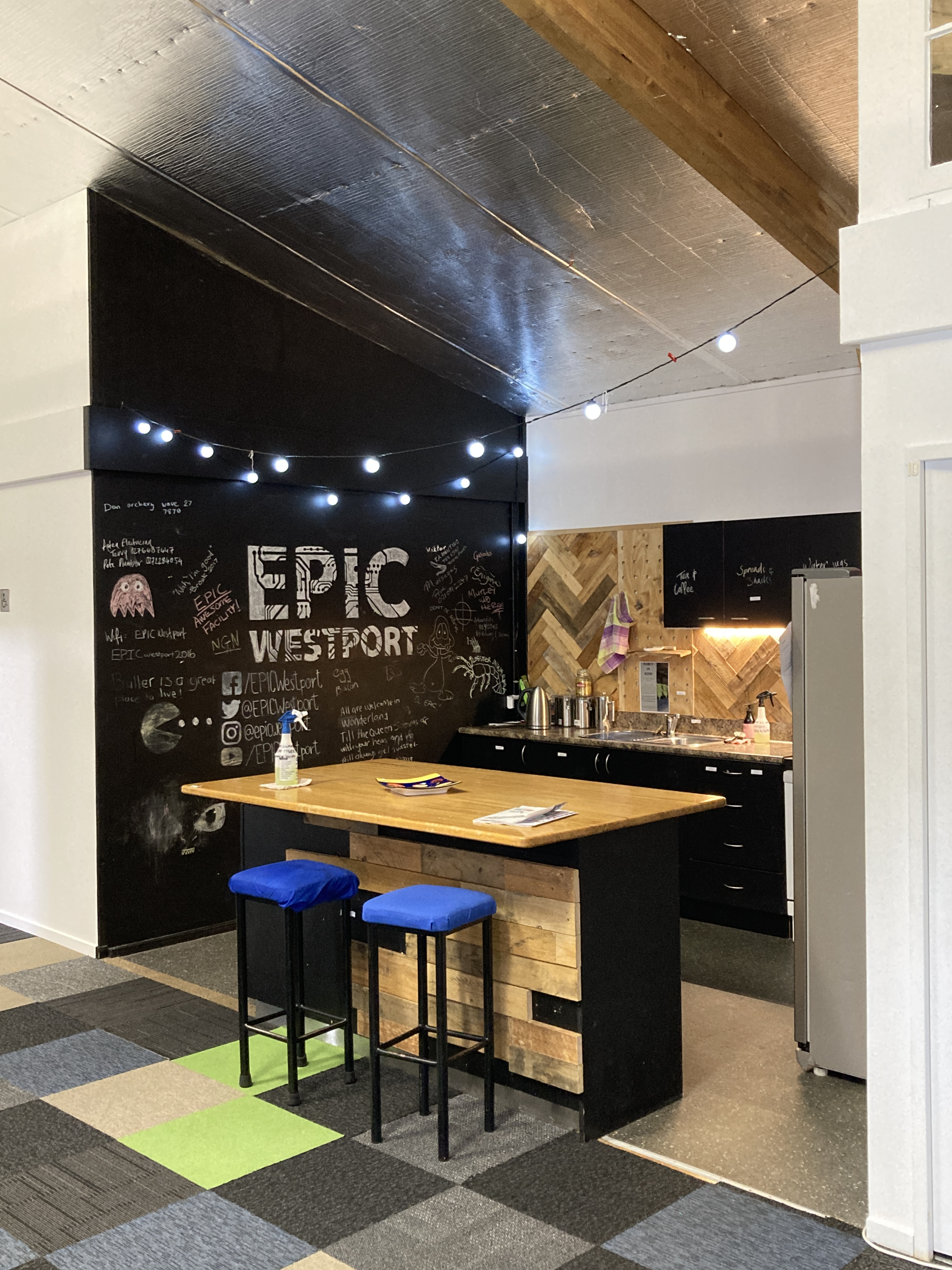
EPIC Westport

In 2010, DWC contributed $3.25 million towards the development of the West Coast Wilderness Trail, and also invested $1.25 million in the creation of the 85 km Old Ghost Road, New Zealand's longest back country cycle trail.

In 2015, DWC added a $5 million Business and Industry Stimulus Fund to provide loans to new or struggling West Coast businesses. One outcome of this was the establishment of EPIC Westport, a Westport technology centre and business incubator able to house 25 full-time workers and a dozen "hot-desk" users. EPIC Westport was a spin-off of the Enterprise Precinct Innovation Centre in Christchurch.

In 2016 Fox Glacier received $1 million for a new community centre and the RSA in Hokitika $400,000 for a new hall.

DWC has financially supported the revival of Reefton, funding the Reefton Shop Front Project to restore its Victorian-era streetscape, and contributing to the Reefton Powerhouse Trust, which aims to restore the original 1888 powerhouse on the Inangahua River that gave Reefton the first electric streetlighting in the southern hemisphere.

DWC is a shareholder in Te Ara Pounamu Ltd, which will spend $17.87 million developing new visitor centres in Westport, Greymouth, Hokitika, and Haast. In response to the COVID-19 pandemic in New Zealand and the loss of tourism revenue, DWC pledged $5 million to support businesses in Fox Glacier and Franz Josef. They approached Tourism Minister Stuart Nash for an additional $35 million in support, but Nash suggested DWC release 10 per cent of its fund instead, suggesting the "rainy day" it was set up for had arrived. DWC supported the creation of Now Open, an online directory of 180 local businesses that were operating under Level 3 restriction, and funded rebates for businesses switching to online delivery.

Development West Coast Tertiary Scholarships were launched in 2022. Four scholarships are offered annually to first time tertiary students as a means to provide a pathway for West Coast students to attain tertiary qualifications and return to the West Coast to undertake their career. The scholarships are valued up to $32,500 per student.

In October 2022, DWC launched a global recruitment campaign called 'Cut out for the Coast'. The campaign was a collaboration between DWC, Te Whatu Ora – Te Tai o Poutini West Coast and the local business community aimed at attracting workers who are ‘Cut out for the Coast. The campaign initially targeted health workers and later expanded to recruitment in other sectors.

DWC invested $3 million into Westland Mineral Sands (WMS) in November 2023. WMS is a minerals, ports and logistics company, which extracts heavy mineral sands including ilmenite, garnet and rare earth elements for the global market, from a site at Cape Foulwind, near Westport.

In the 2024/25 financial year, DWC invested AU$3 million in the Snowy River gold mine project near Reefton, and contributed to the Richmond Quay development in Greymouth, which includes a new library, commercial facilities, and public spaces.

In the same financial year, DWC supported housing initiatives through commercial lending to help address workforce-related housing shortages linked to major mining projects in the pipeline on the West Coast.

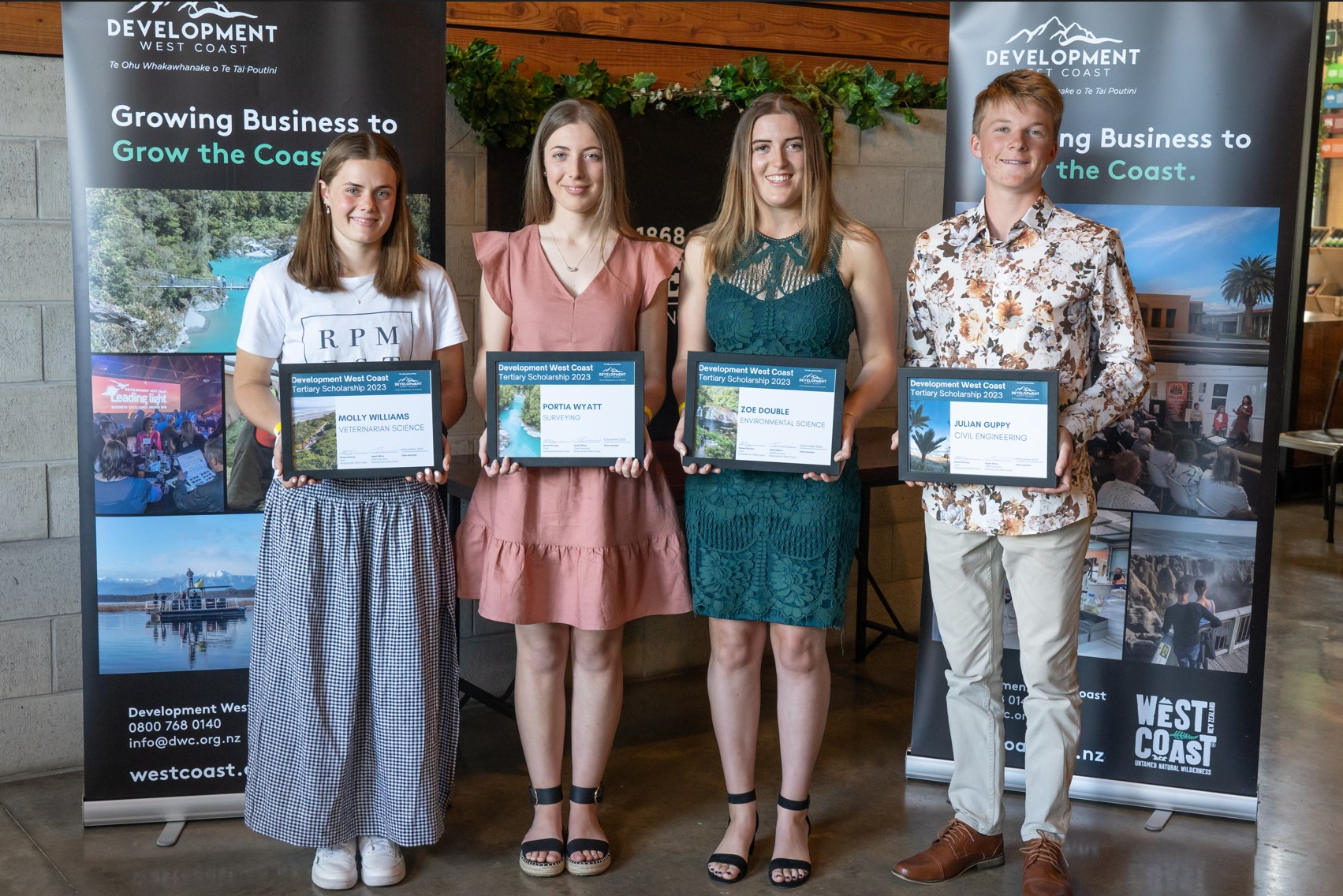
2023 DWC Tertiary Scholarship recipients

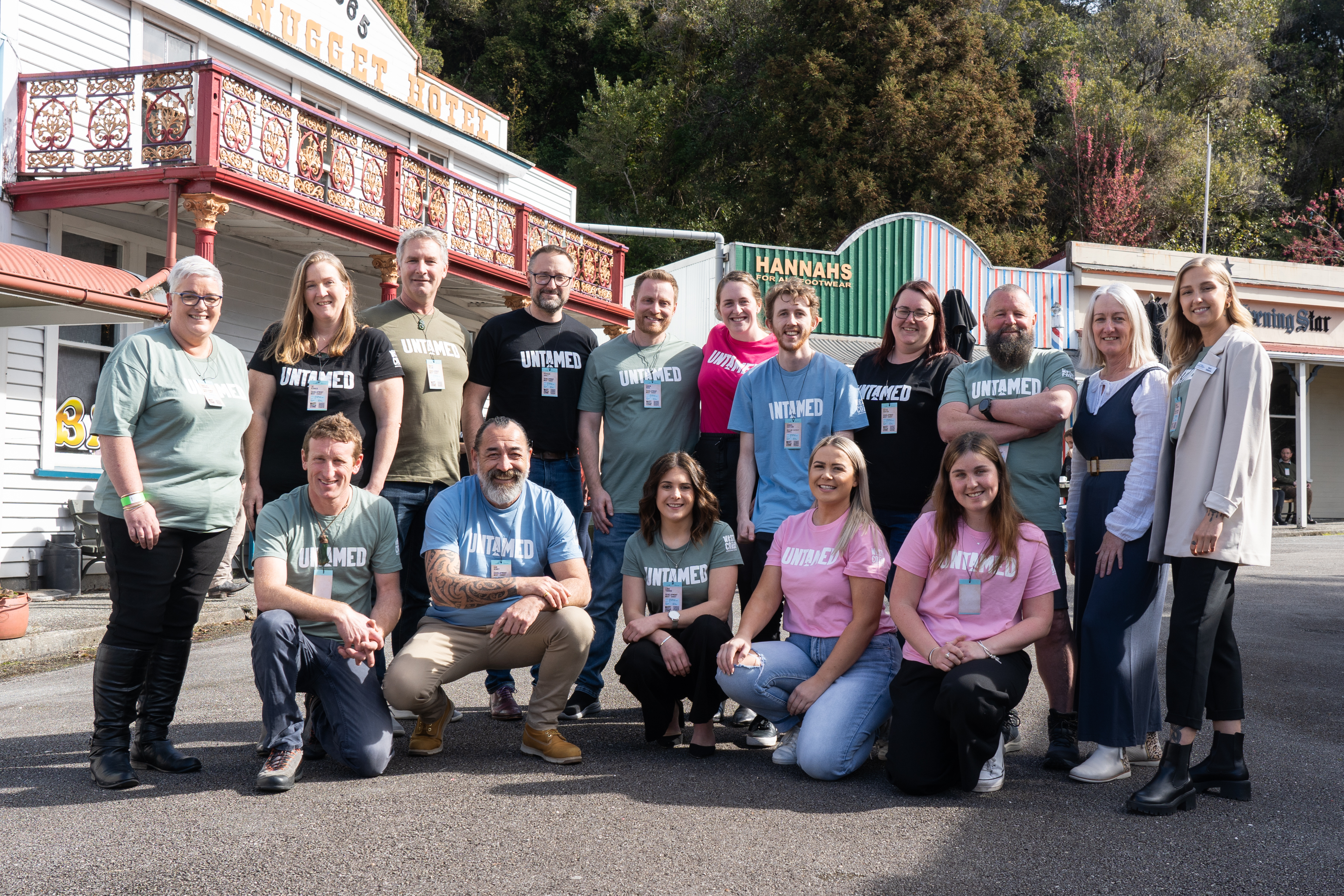
The 2023 West Coast Tourism Summit hosted by DWC at Shantytown.

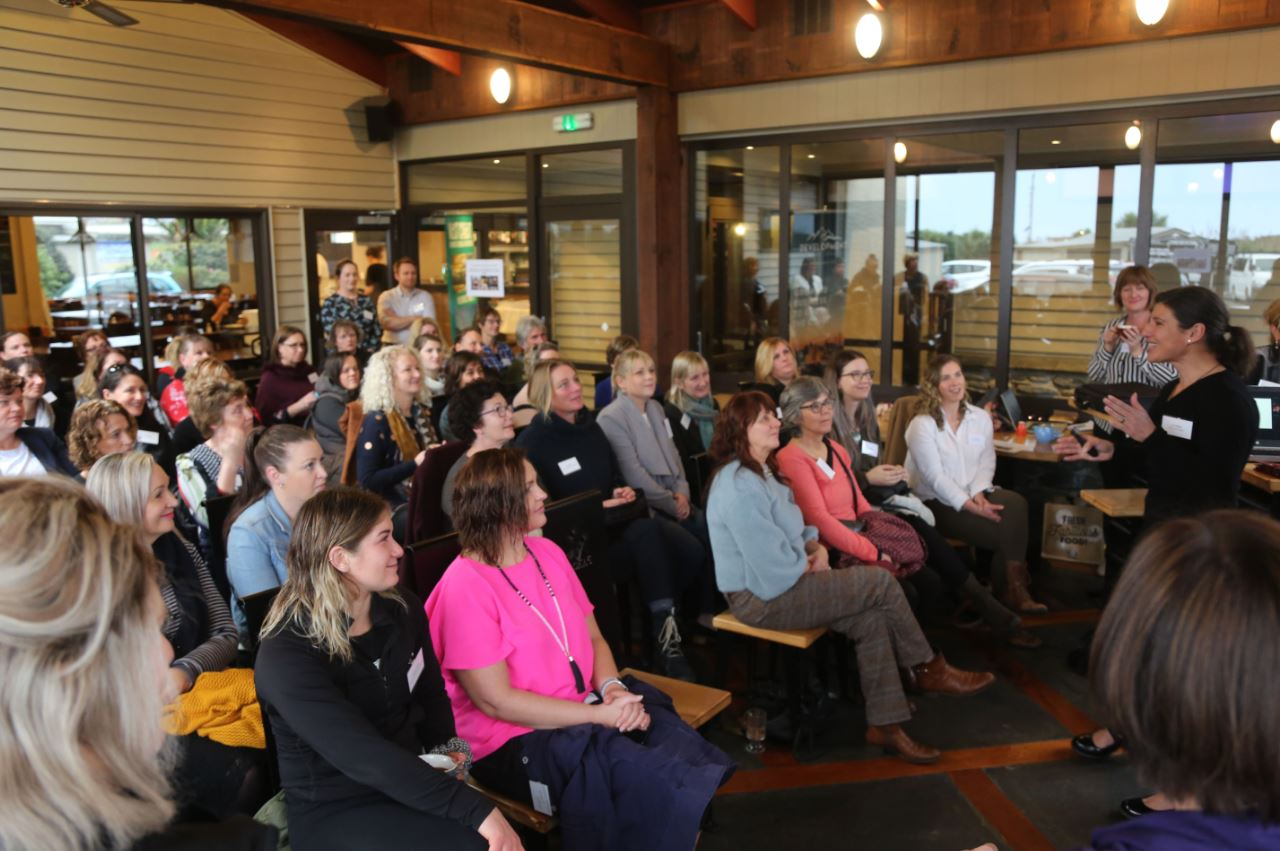
Women in business networking event hosted by DWC.

== Awards ==
In 2012, DWC won the 'Not for Profit' category at the AUT Excellence in Business Support Awards.

DWC won a Gold Award for 'Best use of Media Relations' at the 2022 Public Relations New Zealand (PRINZ) Awards. The award was for DWC's media outreach around the Ōkārito GorseBusters initiative. DWC was also runner up in the 'In-house PR Team of the Year' category.

DWC's media outreach around the 'Cut out for the Coast' campaign won a Silver Award for 'Best use of Media Relations' at the 2023 PRINZ Awards. DWC also received a Silver Award for 2023 'In-house PR Team of the Year'.

At the 2023 Economic Development New Zealand (EDNZ) Awards, DWC won the award for 'Best Practice in Collaboration' for the Upskill West Coast employment and training scheme.

DWC won a Gold Award for 'Most Innovative Campaign' for the 'West Coast Wikipedian at Large Project' at the 2024 PRINZ Awards. DWC also secured Silver Awards in four other categories: 'Best Use of Media Relations', ‘'Best Use of Digital and Social Media', 'Community Relations & Engagement', and ‘Best In-house PR Team’.

At the 2024 EDNZ Awards, DWC won the award for 'Best Practice for Sector and Cluster Development Award' for Te Tai Poutini Nature Economy Project.

In 2025, Development West Coast received three Silver Awards at the PRINZ) Awards, recognised for Best Use of Media Relations, Marketing Communications, and Best In-house PR Team.

DWC won both the ''Best Practice for Sector and Cluster Development' and 'Best Practice for Integrated Strategy' categories at the 2025 EDNZ Awards.

DWC won the Tourism Collaboration Award at the 2025 New Zealand Tourism for the Ōkārito Plant Project - a collaboration between local tourism operators, landowners, the Ōkārito Native Plants Trust, and DWC.

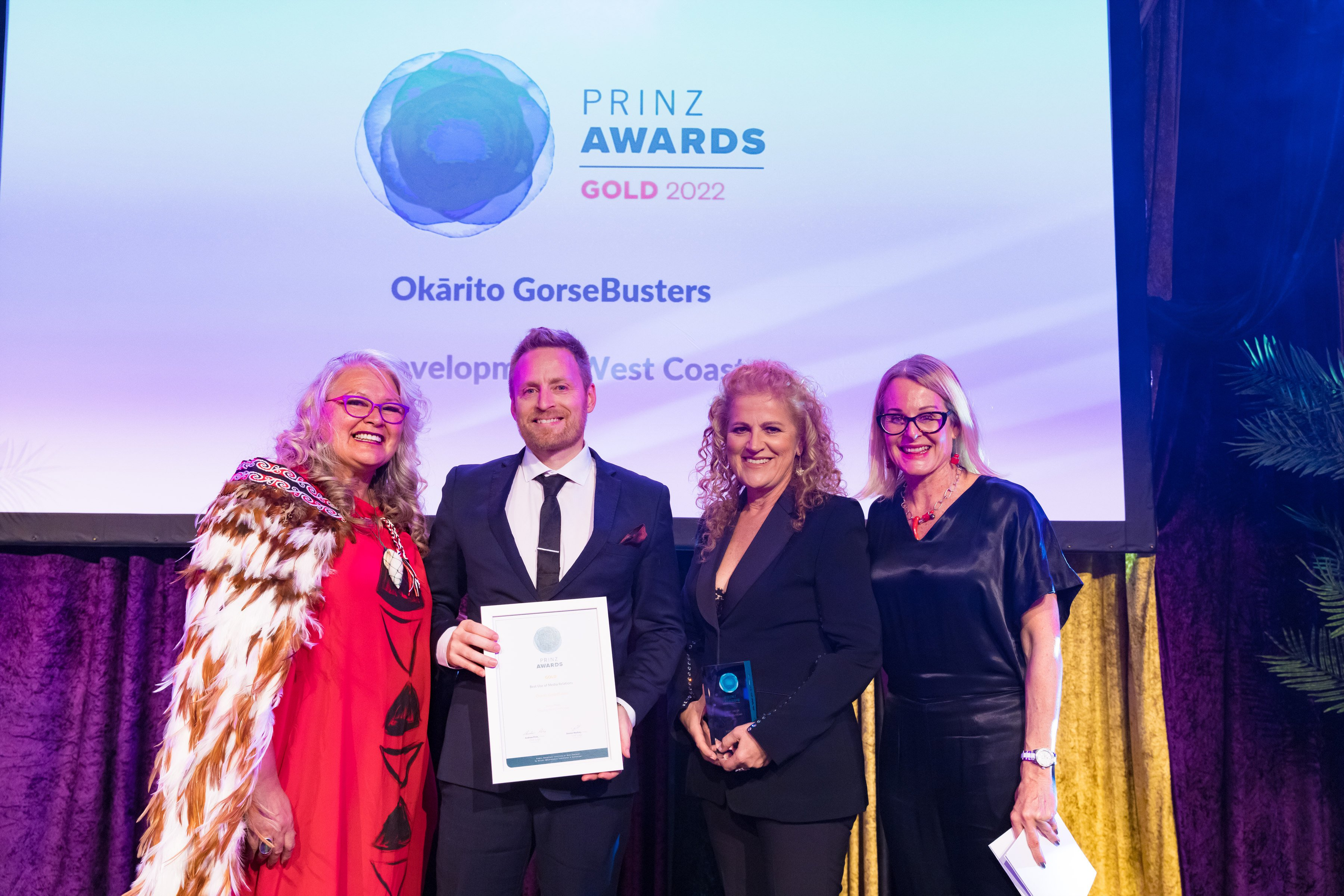
Aaron Rees (DWC Marketing and Communications Manager) and Dame Julie Christie (DWC Trustee) at the 2022 PRINZ Awards.

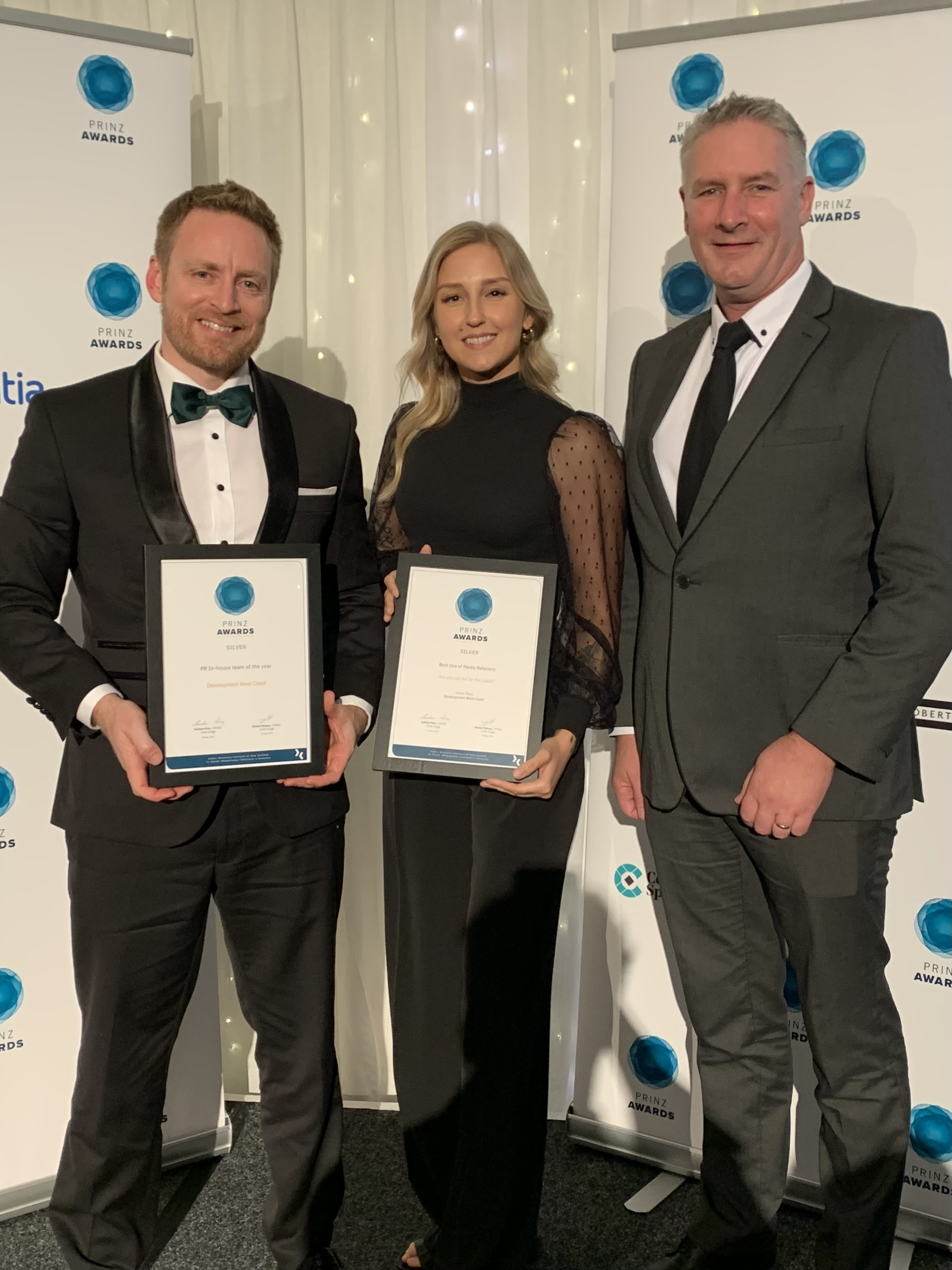
Aaron Rees (DWC Marketing and Communications Manager), Noora Tuikkanen (DWC Digital Marketing Officer) and Heath Milne (DWC Chief Executive) at the 2023 PRINZ Awards.

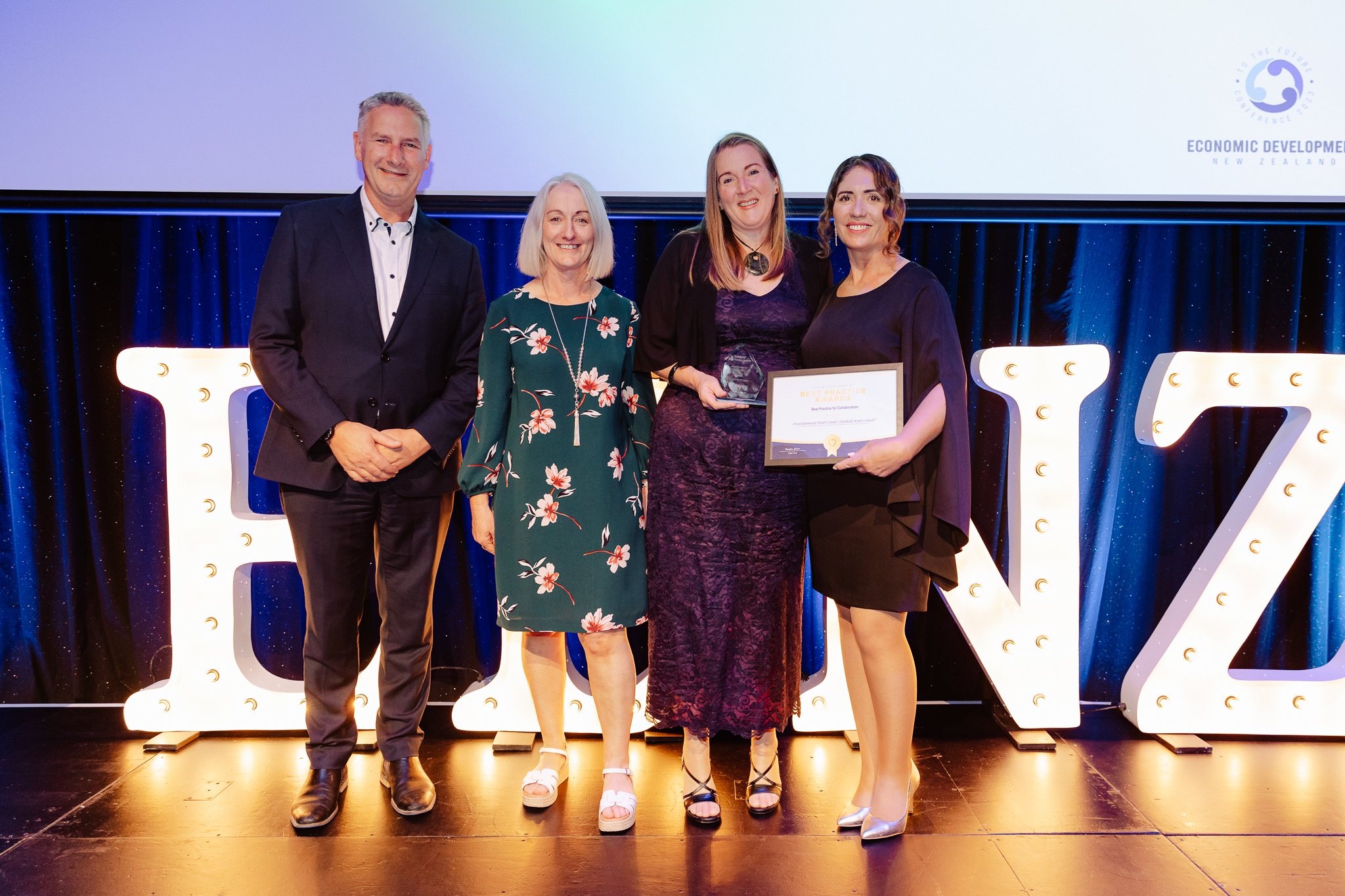
Heath Milne (DWC Chief Executive), Fiona Hill (DWC Capability and Growth Manager), Jo Birnie (DWC Economic Development Manager), and Tania Washer (Upskill Manager) at the 2023 EDNZ Awards.

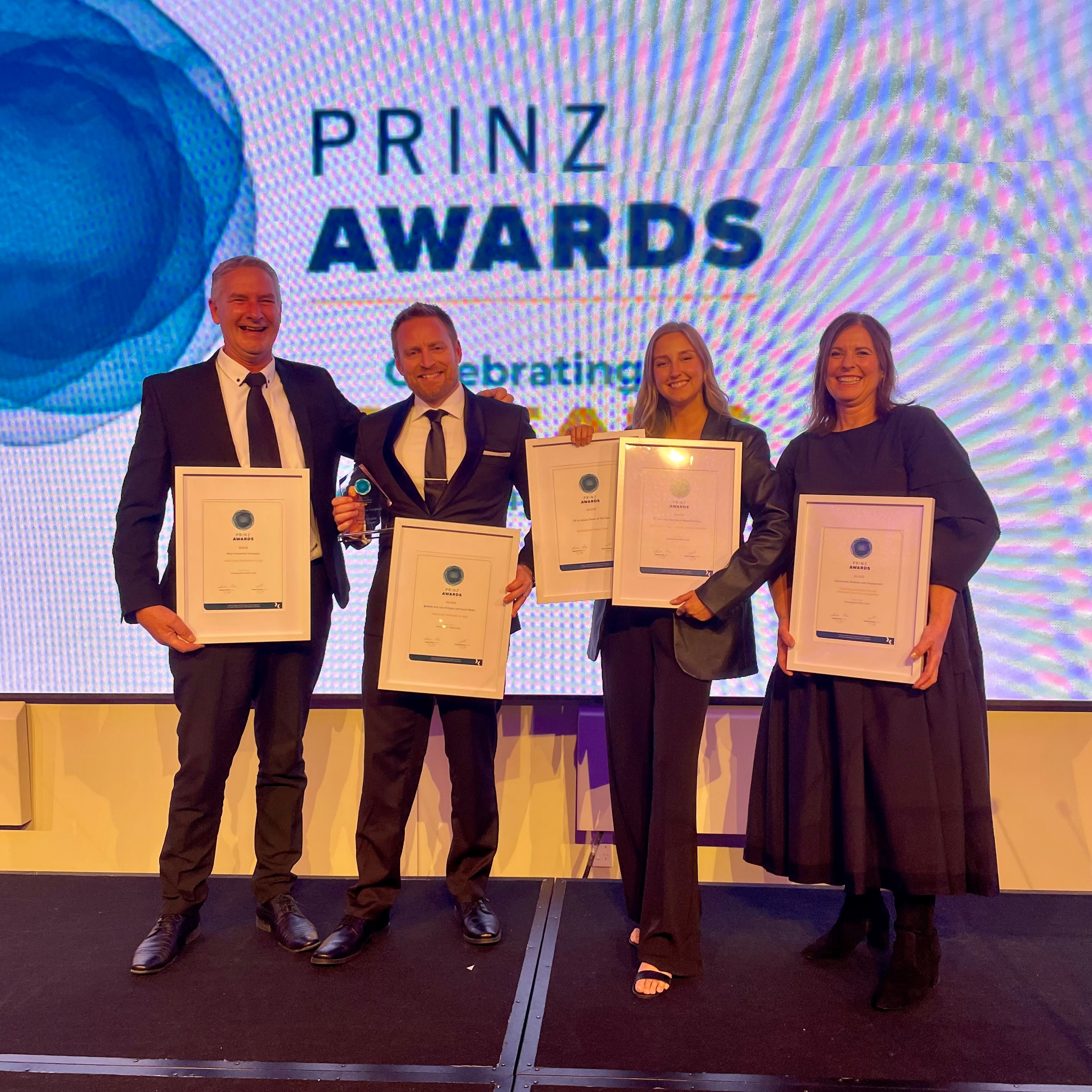
Heath Milne (DWC Chief Executive), Aaron Rees (DWC Marketing and Communications Manager), Noora Tuikkanen (DWC Digital Marketing Officer) and Renee Rooney (DWC Chair) at the 2024 PRINZ Awards.
