= Keith Turner (businessman) =

New Zealand electrical engineer and business executive

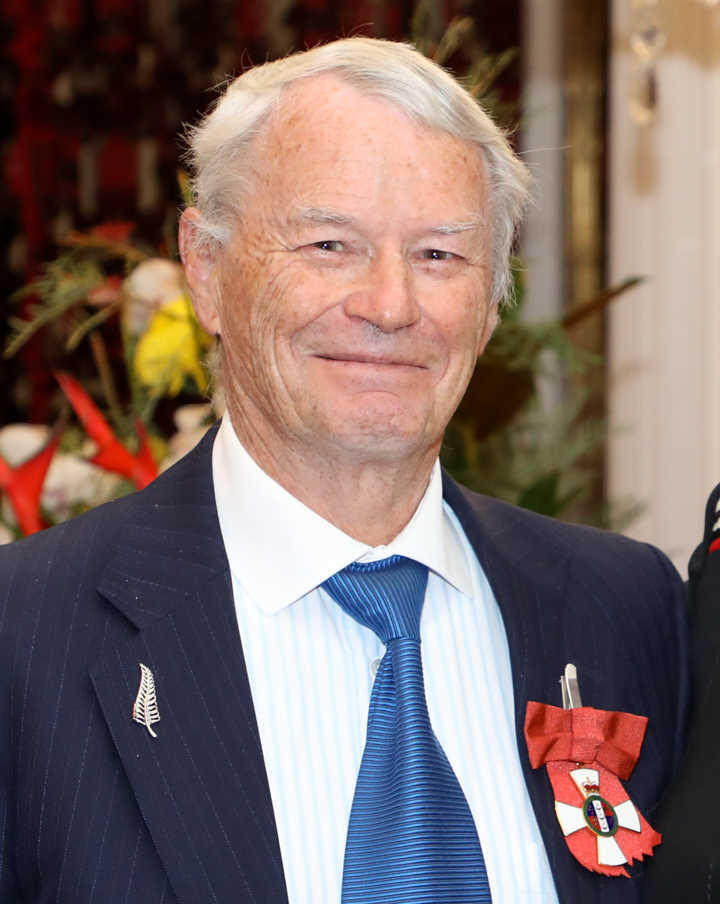
Turner in 2025

Keith Sharman Turner CNZM (born 1950) is a New Zealand electrical engineer and business executive. He is a Fellow of Engineering New Zealand. In December 2024, he was appointed a Companion of the New Zealand Order of Merit, for services to the electricity industry. In September 2007, New Zealand Listener magazine placed Turner in 14th position in its 2007 Power List of the 50 most powerful people in New Zealand, down from 12th in the 2006 Power List and 42nd place in 2005.

== Early life and education ==
Turner was born in New Zealand in 1950. He completed a Bachelor of Engineering and a Master of Engineering at the University of Canterbury, followed by a PhD in electrical engineering in 1980.

== Career ==
Turner's early career was in the New Zealand electricity industry, in which he began in 1969.

- Managing director, DesignPower, a professional engineering consultancy to the electricity industry
- Chief Operating Officer, Electricity Corporation of New Zealand prior to its breakup in 1999
- Chief Executive, Meridian Energy, 1999 to 2008.
- Deputy Chairman, Auckland International Airport, Director since 2004
- Director, Spark Infrastructure
- Chairman, Fisher & Paykel 2011
- Member of the Interim Climate Change Committee, 2018

== Renewable energy ==
Turner has expressed interest in social, economic and environmental sustainability, and renewable energy in New Zealand. In The case for renewable generation in 2004 he said: "The choices we make – you and I and the rest of New Zealand – the choices we make over the next few years, are going to shape the energy structure of our society for at least the next one, and possibly the next two, generations".

According to Turner, a viable transmission grid is an important ingredient of his renewable energy strategy. He has been critical of the lack of investment in the electricity transmission grid in New Zealand by the state-owned enterprise Transpower. In November 2005, he advised that "New Zealand's electricity grid is so overworked that some lines cannot be taken out for servicing", which was vindicated by the 2006 Auckland Blackout, when half of Auckland lost power during a storm because an earth wire snapped and fell on switching equipment.

Turner is part owner of Waitaki Wind Limited, a company investigating wind farms in Otago.
