= Climate Change Response (Zero Carbon) Amendment Act 2019 =

Act of Parliament in New Zealand

New Zealand Parliament
- Assented to by: Governor-General Dame Patsy Reddy
- Assented to: 13 November 2019

Legislative history
- Introduced by: James Shaw
- First reading: 21 May 2019
- Second reading: 5 November 2019
- Third reading: 7 November 2019

The Climate Change Response (Zero Carbon) Amendment Act 2019 is an act of Parliament in New Zealand that amends the Climate Change Response Act 2002 to provide a framework for New Zealand to develop and implement climate change policies in support of the Paris Agreement.

== Legislative features ==
The Act amends the Climate Change Response Act 2002 to provide a framework for New Zealand to develop and implement climate change policies that contribute to global efforts under the Paris Agreement to limit the global average temperature increase to 1.5 degrees Celsius above pre-industrial levels. New Zealand ratified the Paris Agreement in October 2015. Its first nationally determined contribution (NDC) was to reduce greenhouse gas emissions by 30 percent below 2005 levels by 2030. In 2021, the NDC was increased to a 50 percent reduction below 2005 levels by 2030. Key provisions of the Zero Carbon Act include establishing a Climate Change Commission, requiring the government to set five year emission budgets, requiring the development of an emission reduction plan and establishing a target to reduce net carbon emissions (except biogenic methane) to zero and biogenic methane emissions by 24-47% (from a 2017 baseline) by 2050. Unlike the NDC under the Paris Agreement which can be met with offshore mitigation (offsetting), the carbon budgets under the Act must be met via domestic action.

== History ==
Minister for Climate Change Issues and Green Party leader James Shaw introduced the Zero Carbon bill into Parliament on 8 May 2019. The opposition National Party supported it at its first reading, while expressing concerns about its methane targets, and the bill passed its first reading on 21 May 2019. It passed its second reading on 5 November 2019.

The bill passed its third and final reading on 7 November 2019 unanimously. David Seymour of the ACT New Zealand party was opposed to the bill and intended to vote against it, but missed the vote. It received royal assent on 13 November 2019. The National Party said that they opposed the 24–47 per cent methane reduction target and that they would remove the methane target when they next form a government.
