= Aotearoa New Zealand Public Media Bill =

Proposed Act of Parliament in New Zealand

New Zealand Parliament

Legislative history
- Introduced by: Willie Jackson
- First reading: 26 July 2022
- Status: Halted

The Aotearoa New Zealand Public Media Bill is a proposed New Zealand Act of Parliament that would merge TVNZ (Television New Zealand) and Radio New Zealand (RNZ) into a new public media entity known as Aotearoa New Zealand Public Media. It was first introduced on 23 June 2022 and passed its first reading on 26 July 2022. In early February 2023, Prime Minister Chris Hipkins confirmed that the RNZ-TVNZ merger would end due to a governmental shift in focus towards "cost of living" issues.

== Key provisions ==
The Aotearoa New Zealand Public Media Bill:

- Establishes Aotearoa New Zealand Public Media (ANZPM) as a public broadcaster.
- Outlines its objectives, functions, operating principles, and governance.
- Dissolves Radio New Zealand and TVNZ and transfers their public broadcasting provisions to ANZPM.
- Ensures that ANZPM adheres to the principles of the Treaty of Waitangi by requiring at least two board members to have knowledge of Māori language and culture, requiring the entity to engage with the Māori community and collaborate with Māori media entities.
- Outlines the membership and functions of ANZPM's governing board.
- Outlines the functions of ANZPM including promoting Māori language, culture, history and experiences; meeting the needs of New Zealanders of all ages, genders, abilities, ethnicities, and from all regions and communities; and promoting news and information that is reliable, accurate, balanced, and impartial.
- Outlines the charter of ANZPM including a commitment to editorial independence, impartiality, balance; serving the needs of the New Zealand public of diverse backgrounds; and ensuring that broadcast content is predominantly free of charge.
- Outlines the duties and functions of the Minister responsible for the ANZPM.

== Legislative history ==
=== Introduction ===
On 23 June 2022, Broadcasting Minister Willie Jackson introduced the draft Aotearoa New Zealand Public Media Bill to formally merge Radio New Zealand and TVNZ into a new public media entity called Aotearoa New Zealand Public Media. The new entity will be a non-profit autonomous Crown entity and is expected to come into existence on 1 March 2023. Under the proposed legislation, RNZ and TVNZ would become subsidiaries of the new entity, headed by a single board. The ANZPM would be supported through a mixture of commercial and government funding. The ANZPM would also operate under a charter outlining goals and responsibilities, with editorial independence being enshrine in its statutory legislation. The Government also allocated NZ$370m over a period of four years in operating expenditure and $306m in capital funding from the 2022 New Zealand budget to supporting the new public media entity.

=== First reading ===
On 26 July 2022, the Government's Aotearoa New Zealand Public Media Bill passed its first reading at the New Zealand Parliament. The Labour, Green, and Māori parties supported the legislation. The bill's sponsor Jackson claimed that the bill would allow public media to keep delivering for future generations while combating misinformation in increasingly competitive media environment. The opposition National and ACT parties opposed the bill, claiming that it would lead to less diversity within the New Zealand media landscape and also questioned its independence from the Government. The Public Media Bill was referred to Parliament's Economic Development, Science and Innovation select committee, with a six-month period for people to make submissions regarding the bill.

=== Select committee stage ===
By early October 2022, the Aotearoa New Zealand Public Media Bill had received 980 submissions. Submissions supporting the new public media entity claimed that it would strengthen public media while submissions opposing the legislation claimed that the new media entity could distort the media market, undermine commercial competitors, and be subject to political interference. In their submissions, Stuff chief executive Sinead Boucher, MediaWorks New Zealand chief executive Cam Wallace, and Warner Bros. Discovery Senior Vice President Glen Kyne expressed concerns that the proposed media entity could undercut commercial media competitors. In addition, NZME editor Shayne Currie and Wallace called for a thorough cost-benefit analysis of the proposed media entity.

TVNZ CEO Simon Power supported the creation of a new public media entity but expressed concerns about what he perceived as insufficient safeguards about its editorial independence and public trust. While supportive of the aims of the legislation, RNZ CEO Paul Thompson and RNZ board member Jane Wrightson expressed concerns about the media entity's editorial independence. Thompson also regarded the proposed media entity as an opportunity to rebuild the country's public media mandate in the midst of a "volatile" media market where global platforms operated with "unbridled power." He said that new public media entity would be required to collaborate with the wider media sector to ensure a "healthy and diverse" media ecosystem. Save RNZ Concert submitter Elizabeth Kerr sought information about RNZ Concert's place within the new media entity.

Victoria University of Wellington media studies Associate Professor and Better Public Media Trust board member Peter Thompson expressed concerns that the ANZPM Bill failed to uphold the proposed public media entity's non-commercial objectives. He took issue with what he regarded as insufficient government funding to make up for the expected decline in commercial revenue. Thompson also regarded the Bill's provision that ANZPM make content predominantly free to access as an insufficient safeguard against subscription-based service. He also expressed concerns about the Bill's lack of ring fencing for the proposed public media entity against budget cuts caused by changes in government. Thompson also disagreed with the Bill's proposal to make ANZPM an Autonomous Crown Entity (ACE) on the grounds that the organisation would still be subject to ministerial directions. Instead, he proposed that the public media entity be overseen by an independent regulatory body that would ensure the organisation was complying with its charter.

On 8 February 2023, Prime Minister Chris Hipkins confirmed that work on merging RNZ and TVNZ into ANZPM would halt immediately, stating that "Support for public media needs to be at a lower cost and without such significant structural change." Hipkins also confirmed that the two public broadcasters would receive additional governmental funding. Prior to the cancellation, the Government had initially set 1 March as a deadline for passing the Bill into law, with the new entity becoming fully operational in July 2023. The Government subsequently extended the Bill's deadline to 1 July 2023.
