= Willie Jackson (politician) =

New Zealand politician

The Honourable Willie Jackson MP
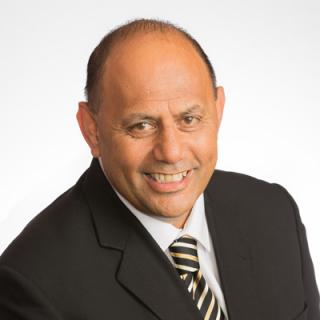

27th Minister of Broadcasting and Media
- In office 14 June 2022 – 27 November 2023
- Prime Minister: Jacinda Ardern; Chris Hipkins
- Preceded by: Kris Faafoi
- Succeeded by: Melissa Lee

45th Minister for Māori Development
- In office 6 November 2020 – 27 November 2023
- Prime Minister: Jacinda Ardern; Chris Hipkins
- Preceded by: Nanaia Mahuta
- Succeeded by: Tama Potaka

17th Minister of Employment
- In office 26 October 2017 – 6 November 2020
- Prime Minister: Jacinda Ardern
- Preceded by: Paul Goldsmith
- Succeeded by: Carmel Sepuloni

Member of the New Zealand Parliament for Labour Party list
- Incumbent
- Assumed office 23 September 2017

3rd Leader of Mana Motuhake
- In office 2 June 2001 – 4 December 2003
- Preceded by: Sandra Lee
- Succeeded by: Party dissolved

Member of the New Zealand Parliament for Alliance party list
- In office 27 November 1999 – 27 July 2002

Personal details
- Born: 1961 (age 64–65)
- Party: Labour (from 2017); Alliance (1999–2002)
- Spouse(s): Moana Maniapoto (div. 2001) Tania Rangiheuea
- Parent: June Jackson (mother)
- Relatives: Syd Jackson (uncle); Moana Jackson (uncle); Everard Jackson (grandfather); Fred Jackson (great-grandfather)
- Profession: Broadcaster; Trade unionist

William Wakatere Jackson (born 1961) is a New Zealand politician and former unionist, broadcaster and Urban Māori leader. He was a Member of Parliament for the Alliance from 1999 to 2002 and is currently a Labour Party MP, having been re-elected in 2017.

Jackson was Minister of Employment, Minister for Māori Development, and Minister of Broadcasting and Media in the Sixth Labour Government.

== Early life and family ==
Jackson was born in 1961, the eldest of three children to Dame Temuranga "June" Batley-Jackson (Ngāti Maniapoto) and Bob Jackson (Ngāti Porou). Bob Jackson's brothers were activist Syd Jackson and lawyer Moana Jackson; their father was All Black Everard Jackson. Bob and June were a dockworker and a cleaner but became leaders of the Urban Māori movement in the 1970s and 1980s. Although Bob spoke te reo Māori as his first language, he did not pass it on to his children and Willie Jackson learned it as an adult through immersion classes.

Willie Jackson is of Māori, Pākehā and Jewish ancestry, growing up in Porirua until the age of 10, when the family moved to Māngere. He describes himself as having been "a failure at school" and after leaving Mangere College became a freezing worker.

Jackson married the singer Moana Maniapoto, whose band he managed; they divorced in 2001. His second wife is Tania Rangiheuea, a former Victoria University of Wellington lecturer and school principal. Jackson has three children, including journalist Hikurangi Jackson.

== Early career ==
After leaving school, Jackson became a freezing worker, where he became involved with trade unions. By age 21, he was president of the freezing workers union and the youngest union leader in the country. At 25, Jackson became an organiser at the Northern Clerical Workers’ Union where he worked with his uncle Syd Jackson and future New Zealand First MP Tau Henare.

In the 1990s, Jackson became a partner at Tangata Records, a label that promoted and developed contemporary Māori music. He managed Moana and the Moahunters, a band fronted by his then-wife Moana Maniapoto. He was also a sports and Māori radio broadcaster on Radio Aotearoa and the manager of All Black Frank Bunce.

Jackson's mother established the Manukau Urban Maori Authority (MUMA) in 1986. He was a spokesperson for MUMA through the fisheries settlements of the 1990s, criticising the proposed allocation of fisheries resources only to iwi because it would disadvantage Urban Māori. With John Tamihere of the West Auckland urban Māori trust Te Whanau o Waipareira, he brought an unsuccessful court case to stop the allocations going ahead in 1997/98.

== Mana Motuhake and the Alliance ==
New Zealand Parliament
Years	Term	Electorate	List	Party
1999–2002	46th	List	9	Alliance
2017–2020	52nd	List	22	Labour
2020–2023	53rd	List	19	Labour
2023–2026	54th	List	9	Labour
2026–present	55th	List	4	Labour

In 1995, Jackson joined the Mana Motuhake party, a Māori party which formed part of the Alliance. He was a candidate for the Alliance in the 1996 election, ranked 20 on the party list and contesting the Manurewa electorate. Jackson's list placement was controversial because he had been ranked eighth of eight Mana Motuhake candidates to be integrated within the combined party list of 65 candidates—an unelectable position. However, the NewLabour component party of the Alliance considered Jackson "one of the most talented new candidates" and enabled him to change his affiliation at the last moment, enabling him to be placed higher. Despite the change, he was not elected.

Jackson returned to Mana Motuhake as its national director ahead of the 1999 general election. He was the Alliance candidate in the new Māori electorate of Hauraki, where he lost to his friend and fellow urban Māori advocate John Tamihere of the Labour Party. Ranked ninth on the Alliance party list—the highest of any candidate who was not already in Parliament—Jackson was elected as a list MP. From 1999 to 2002, he was deputy chair of the Māori affairs committee and also sat on the transport and industrial relations committee. His maiden speech, given on 8 February 2000, seconded the address in reply debate and set out his views on the socio-economic disparities between Māori and Pākehā:

We are at the beginning of a new millennium, and it is timely that Māori should prepare themselves well for the future. One of my aims during this term is to assist Māori to engage in long-term strategic planning for economic and cultural survival. In the immediate term, Māori needs are exactly the same as those of Pākehā. We need jobs, and better housing, health, and education. However, we need a little bit more, for Māori have the responsibility of passing on a language and a culture to successive generations.

In his term in Parliament, Jackson was an outspoken advocate for Māori broadcasting. In his maiden speech, he said his aim was to have "a professional Maori broadcasting system that is well planned, properly resourced, and capable of encompassing all facets of Maori language and culture." He was critical of the Labour government's inaction on the creation of a state-funded Māori television service but won a victory when the Government changed course to allow a pan-Māori authority to control part of the 3G radiowave spectrum.

In 2001, Jackson successfully challenged Mana Motuhake leader Sandra Lee for the leadership of the party within the Alliance. When the Alliance began to collapse in 2002, Jackson sided with the faction led by Laila Harré and Matt McCarten, and remained with the party when Jim Anderton established his breakaway group. In the 2002 election, Jackson became deputy leader of the Alliance under Harré's leadership, but the Alliance failed to win any seats. Mana Motuhake withdrew from the Alliance after the election and Jackson resigned the party leadership in 2003.

== Return to broadcasting ==
After losing his re-election bid at the 2002 general election, Jackson returned to his broadcasting career. He became general manager of Radio Waatea, and later the chief executive of Urban Māori Broadcasting, and was the host of two television current affairs programmes. Eye to Eye with Willie Jackson aired on TV One from 2004 to 2009. From 2009, Jackson moved to Māori Television where he hosted Willie Jackson's Newsbites until 2011. As an interviewer, Jackson was praised by Bill Ralston, who said that Jackson knew how to get the best out of his guests.

A hosting partnership between Jackson and John Tamihere began in 2006 with an afternoon talkback programme on Radio Live; this ran until 2013 and ended in the wake of the Roast Busters scandal, where Jackson and Tamihere were embroiled in the controversy after speaking on-air with a friend of an alleged victim of the group who had launched the rape complaints, the hosts referred to the rapists group's actions as "mischief". This caused a number of advertisers to pull support from Radio Live and the show being taken off-air. The duo also co-hosted The World According to Willie and JT on TV One in 2007.

Jackson returned to Radio Live in 2014, co-hosting the afternoon programme with Alison Mau. He resigned from Radio Live in early 2017 after being announced as a Labour Party candidate in the 2017 general election.

== Return to advocacy and politics ==
Jackson remained involved in politics after his 2002 defeat. He unsuccessfully attempted to create a pan-Māori party between 2002 and 2003, then became an early supporter of Tariana Turia's Māori Party. A bid to become Mayor of Manukau City in 2007 was unsuccessful, with Jackson placing fourth in a crowded field that also included Len Brown, Dick Quax, and Arthur Anae. After Hone Harawira split from the Māori Party in 2011, Jackson became a supporter of the Mana Movement and an advocate for political peace between the two Māori parties. Jackson considered standing for the Mana Movement in Tāmaki Makaurau at the 2011 election, but declined to run.

Jackson was elected the first chair of the National Urban Māori Authority (NUMA) in 2003 and succeeded his mother as chief executive of the Manukau Urban Māori Authority (MUMA) in 2009. He left those leadership roles after being re-elected to Parliament in 2017. During Jackson's tenure leading these organisations, NUMA won a bid to be the North Island Whānau Ora commissioning agency in 2014 and a subsidiary of MUMA won the contract for a South Auckland charter school in 2017.

== Labour Party ==
=== Sixth Labour Government, 2017–2023 ===
Jackson was recruited by Labour Party leader Andrew Little to stand as a Labour candidate and run the party's campaign for the Māori electorates in the 2017 general election. As Māori campaign manager, Jackson called for the Green Party to withdraw some of its candidates so that Labour would have a stronger chance of winning its own races, but was rebuffed by his own leader. Nonetheless, Labour won all seven Māori electorates. Jackson, who had stood as a list-only candidate, was elected as a Labour Party list MP.

Following post-election negotiations between Labour, New Zealand First and the Greens and the formation of a coalition government, Jackson was appointed the Minister of Employment and Associate Minister for Māori Development (outside Cabinet). He also sat on the foreign affairs, defence and trade committee. After Jackson was re-elected in the 2020 general election, he was elevated to the Cabinet as Minister for Māori Development and given the associate portfolios for the Accident Compensation Corporation (ACC) and justice. He also held the internal Labour Party office of co-chair of the Māori caucus.

In late November 2021, Jackson apologised to the Moriori on behalf of Ngāti Tama and Ngāti Mutunga for his ancestors' role in the Moriori genocide. This apology accompanied the passage of the Moriori Claims Settlements Bill, which formalised the New Zealand Government's financial compensation settlement to the Moriori within the framework of the Treaty of Waitangi.

In early December 2021, Jackson was ejected from the New Zealand Parliament debating chamber for refusing to apologise after National Party MP Maureen Pugh had objected to him calling the ACT party "right-wing fascists." Jackson had made these remarks during a debate on a bill to include two Ngāi Tahu representatives on the Canterbury Regional Council after the 2022 New Zealand local elections.

In a June 2022 reshuffle, Jackson was also appointed Minister of Broadcasting and Media. As Broadcasting Minister, Jackson introduced draft legislation to merge the public broadcasters Radio New Zealand and TVNZ into a new non-profit autonomous Crown entity called Aotearoa New Zealand Public Media (ANZPM). During a live television interview with TVNZ journalist Jack Tame on TVNZ's Q+A in December 2022, Jackson defended the Government's public media merger efforts particularly its commitment to editorial independence and questioned the motives and impartiality of his host. In response, Prime Minister Jacinda Ardern expressed disagreement with Jackson's remarks but defended his competence as Minister of Broadcasting. The interview was described as "a trainwreck" by the National Party's broadcasting spokesperson Melissa Lee and Jackson's apologised for his conduct on 6 December, but defended the public media merger and accused the New Zealand media of fomenting opposition to the merger effort. The merger was cancelled two months later.

=== Opposition, 2023–present ===
During the 2023 New Zealand general election held on 14 October, Jackson was re-elected to Parliament on the Labour party list. He again led Labour's campaign strategy for the Māori electorates, but was unsuccessful with only one seat being won by Labour. Jackson said he considered quitting politics after the election, but decided to stay on for the term.

In early November 2023, Jackson stated that Māori people would "go to war" if the incoming Sixth National Government proceeded with an ACT campaign promise to hold a referendum on redefining the principles of the Treaty of Waitangi. In response to Jackson's remarks, ACT leader David Seymour reiterated that ACT wanted a "rational debate" on the topic and stated that "when people threaten war as the alternative to that, they are not being a good actor investing in the future of our country."

In late November 2023, Jackson assumed the Māori Development, broadcasting and media, employment and associate housing and associate workplace relations and safety portfolios in the Shadow Cabinet of Chris Hipkins.

On 5 December 2023, Jackson was granted retention of the title The Honourable, in recognition of his term as a member of the Executive Council.

In late May 2024, Jackson participated in an Oxford Union debate where he delivered a winning speech calling for the return of seven mokomōkai (preserved Māori heads adorned with customary Māori tattoos known as moko) from the British Museum. His speech also criticised the legacy of British colonialism in New Zealand.

In November 2024, Jackson was again ejected from the New Zealand Parliament debating chamber, after calling ACT Party Leader David Seymour a liar during the first reading of the Treaty Principles Bill. He later said at the 2024 Labour Party Annual conference that if he is "not a liar", then he is a "special kind of stupid that I have never seen before."

In early March 2025, Jackson retained the Māori development portfolio and gained the social development portfolio during a cabinet reshuffle. He lost the broadcasting and media, employment, associate housing and associate workplace relations portfolios.

In mid May 2025, Jackson was ordered by Assistant Speaker Greg O'Connor to leave Parliament's debating chamber after making remarks criticising the National-led coalition government for allegedly attacking the Waitangi Tribunal, Māori health services, and the Treaty of Waitangi during the third reading of the Ngā Hapū o Ngāti Ranginui Claims Settlement Bill.

On 11 March 2026, Jackson retained the Māori development portfolio and gained the Māori-Crown relations and associate health for Māori portfolios during a cabinet reshuffle.

During the 2026 New Zealand general election, Jackson was ranked fourth on the Labour Party list. Based on preliminary results, he was re-elected via the Labour Party list.

On 20 November 2026, Jackson called for the expulsion of United States Ambassador to New Zealand Jared Novelly during a Herald Now morning show after the latter criticised Mayor of Auckland Wayne Brown for making remarks criticising democracy, praising China and suggesting that New Zealand give up its membership of the Five Eyes. In response, the Labour Party issued a statement distancing the party from Jackson's remarks, which they described as his personal views rather than party policy.

Party political offices
Preceded by Sandra Lee	Leader of Mana Motuhake; 2001–2003	Party dissolved
Political offices
Preceded by Kris Faafoi	Minister for Broadcasting and Media; 2022–2023	Succeeded by Melissa Lee
Preceded by Nanaia Mahuta	Minister for Māori Development; 2020–2023	Succeeded by Tama Potaka
Preceded by Paul Goldsmith	Minister of Employment; 2017–2020	Succeeded by Carmel Sepuloni
