= Syd Jackson (Māori activist) =

New Zealand activist

- Born: Sydney Keepa Jackson; 18 December 1938
- Died: 3 September 2007 (aged 68)
- School: Nelson College
- University: University of Auckland
- Notable relative(s): Everard Jackson (father); Fred Jackson (grandfather); Moana Jackson (brother); June Jackson (sister-in-law); Willie Jackson (nephew)
- Occupation: Trade unionist

Rugby union career
- Position
Provincial / State sides
Years	Team	Apps	(Points)
1959–60	Wellington		

Sydney Keepa Jackson (18 December 1938 – 3 September 2007) was a prominent Māori activist, trade unionist and leader.

== Biography ==
Jackson, of Ngāti Kahungunu and Ngāti Porou descent, was born on 18 December 1938, and educated at Nelson College from 1952 to 1956. He first came to prominence at the University of Auckland, where he gained an MA. He was the chairman of the Māori Students Association, and then was a founder of Ngā Tamatoa. He was strongly involved in supporting Tino Rangatiratanga, the revival of the Māori language, and the Māori protest movement in general.

He was the son of the All Black Everard Jackson, and grandson of New Zealand national rugby league team representative Frederick Stanley Jackson. He played representative rugby union for Wellington in 1959 and 1960, and was a New Zealand Māori trialist. He was active from 1968 against apartheid, particularly New Zealand tours of South Africa.

In the 1970s Jackson was one of the founding members of Ngā Tamatoa, a Maori activist group. During this period he and Ngā Tamatoa were influenced by the works of the American Black Panther Party members such as Eldridge Cleaver and Stokely Carmichael. He stood unsuccessfully for the Auckland City Council on the Labour Party ticket at the 1977 local election. Polling poorly, he finished fourth to last.

Jackson was deeply involved in the trade union movement in the 1980s, as a field officer and then as secretary of the Clerical Workers Union for 17 years.

He was also the chairperson of Te Kupenga o Hoturoa – the first Māori sponsored primary healthcare organisation; a Director of Te Roopu Huihuinga Hauora, a Māori healthcare organisation, and built up Turuki Healthcare as its CEO.

Jackson was first married to the late Hana Te Hemara, and was survived by his second wife Deirdre Nehua and his eight children. He was the brother of Moana Jackson.
