= Ngā Tamatoa =

Māori rights activist group

- Formation: Early 1970s
- Purpose: Activist group that promoted Māori rights and addressed violations by the New Zealand Government against the Treaty of Waitangi.
- Location: New Zealand
- Key people: Hone Harawira, Titewhai Harawira, Donna Awatere Huata, Tame Iti, Jim Moriarty, Rawiri Paratene, Larry Parr, Tama Poata, Ngahuia Te Awekotuku, Hana Te Hemara, Kura Te Waru Rewiri, Linda Tuhiwai Smith

Ngā Tamatoa (The Warriors) was a Māori activist group that operated throughout the 1970s to promote Māori rights, fight racial discrimination, and confront injustices perpetrated by the New Zealand Government, particularly violations of the Treaty of Waitangi.

== Origins ==
Ngā Tamatoa emerged from a conference at the University of Auckland organised by academic and historian Ranginui Walker. The group was inspired by international liberation and indigenous movements such as the Black Panther Party and the American Indian Movement which characterised the New Left of the 1970s internationally. Syd Jackson, one of the founding members of Ngā Tamatoa, drew from the works of Eldridge Cleaver and Stokely Carmichael. Ngā Tamatoa often worked alongside the Polynesian Panthers, who also drew direct inspiration from the Black Panther Party.

Member Taura Eruera said of the group's beginning "Our tohu at the time was tama tu, tama ora, tama noho, tama mate, tamatoa — meaning stand up and do something, don't sit and do nothing."

Members of Ngā Tamatoa included Hone Harawira and his mother Titewhai Harawira, Donna Awatere Huata, Tame Iti, Jim Moriarty, Rawiri Paratene, Larry Parr, Hana Te Hemara, Kura Te Waru Rewiri, Linda Tuhiwai Smith and Ngahuia Te Awekotuku. Tama Poata was a member who was also involved in other activist groups, Māori Organisation On Human Rights and Halt All Racist Tours (HART), and was influential in the film and TV industry. Member Taitimu Maipi recounted the leadership of women in Ngā Tamatoa, describing efforts by Hilda Harawera in Māori language activism.

== Māori language ==
In September 1972, Ngā Tamatoa presented a petition with more than 30,000 signatures to the Crown to have Māori taught in schools. Titewhai Harawera was strongly involved in this campaign for the Māori language with Ngā Tamatoa. She said in 2009:

We were determined to rescue our language because we felt and we believed, and we believe today, that a people without its language is a people that die.

== 1975 Land March ==
Ngā Tamatoa organised the historic 1975 Land March, led by Dame Whina Cooper, from the top of New Zealand's North Island to Parliament in Wellington. Following the march, Ngā Tamatoa created a 'Tent Embassy' by camping on Parliament grounds in Wellington, demanding immediate action on land march issues.

== He Taua 1979 ==
The organisation was involved in disrupting the University of Auckland haka party, a part of the annual student capping parade. This was an annual parade in which engineering students parodied the Māori haka, by painting male genitals on their body and performing with sexually obscene gestures. The disruption was mainly organised by a group of Māori and Pacific Island students, called He Taua 'War Party.' Following a violent attack on the engineering students, when several students were assaulted, members of He Taua were arrested. Their court case in Auckland sparked anti-racism protests outside the courthouse. Members of He Taua included Hone Harawira, who later became a Member of Parliament. Actor and writer Katie Wolfe wrote and produced a play and film The Haka Party Incident about the incident and its aftermath.
