= Hana Te Hemara =

New Zealand activist

- Born: Hana Mere Te Hemara; 16 February 1940; Puketapu, Bell Block, New Zealand
- Died: 10 October 1999 (aged 59); Auckland, New Zealand
- Other names: Hana Mere Jackson
- Known for: Māori activist
- Spouse: Syd Jackson
- Children: 2

Hana Mere Te Hemara (16 February 1940 – 10 October 1999) was a prominent Māori activist and leader.

== Biography ==
Te Hemara, of Te Āti Awa and Ngāti Raukawa descent, was the seventh of 12 children, born in Puketapu and educated at the Waitara Convent.

She grew up in Mangakino where her father worked on the dams at Karapiro and Mangakino Later she worked as a telephone operator in various places

Te Hemara started studying at the University of Auckland in 1969 at the age of 30 to study politics and New Zealand history. She was actively involved with Ngā Tamatoa. She strongly supported Tino Rangatiratanga, the revival of the Māori language, and the Māori protest movement in general.

In the 1970s Te Hemara was one of the founding members of Ngā Tamatoa, a Māori activist group. The group organised protests at Waitangi.

On 14 September 1972, Te Hemara along with Lee Smith, Rawiri Paratene and Syd Jackson presented a petition of over 30,000 signatures to parliament challenging the politicians to prioritise saving Te Reo Māori. This led to the day being declared Māori Language Day. Three years later, it was expanded to Māori Language Week.

In 1979, Te Hemara joined the Māori Affairs Department with the Māori Language Commission, a result of her work. She formed the first Māori Business and Professional Association in 1980 and organised Te Kopu Designers' Award for Māori designers in 1984.

Te Hemara married Syd Jackson in 1961. Together they raised two children. She died in Auckland on 10 October 1999, aged 59.
