= Moana Jackson =

New Zealand Māori lawyer (1945–2022)

Moana Jackson CRSNZ
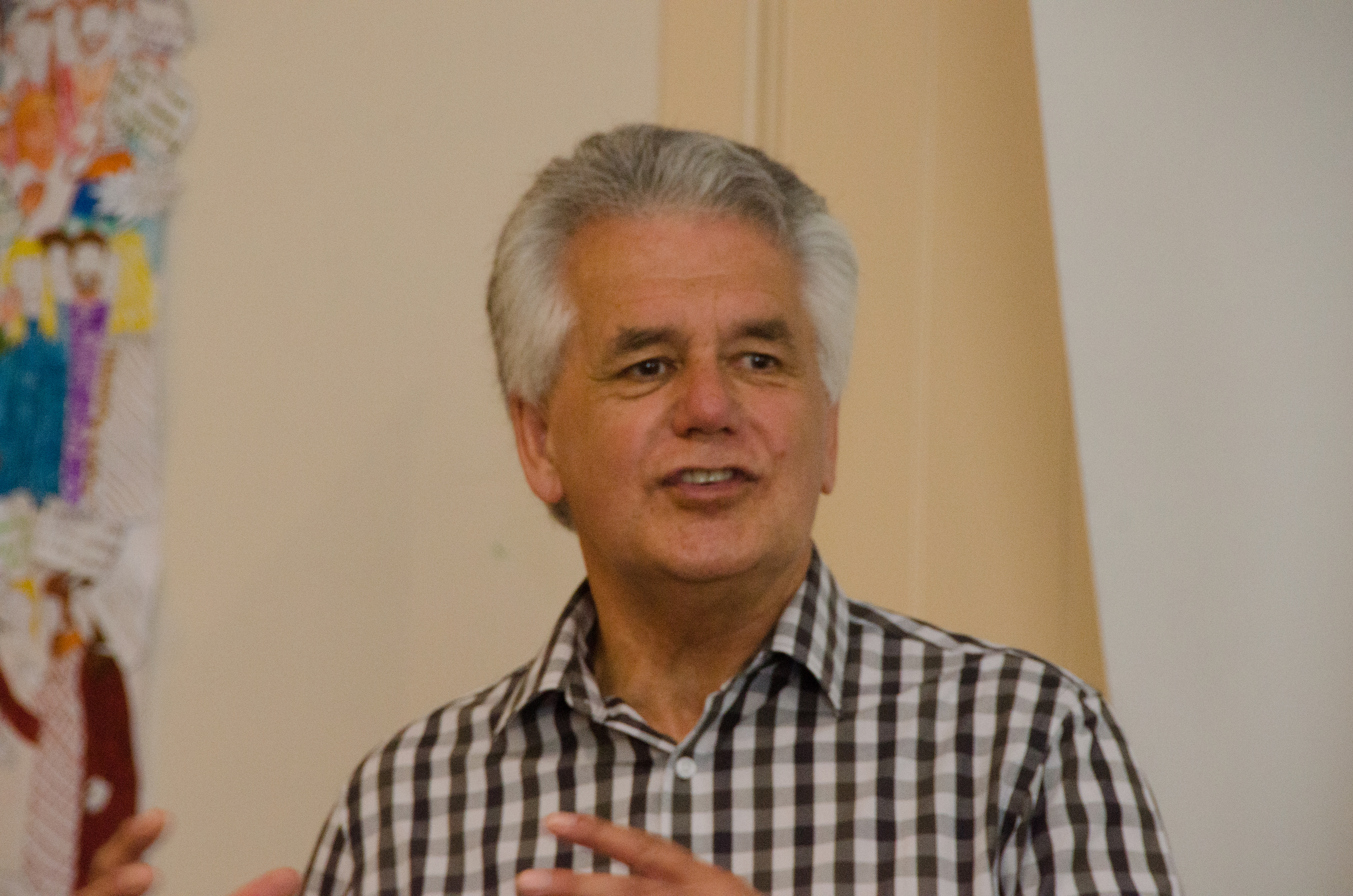
- Born: 10 October 1945; Hastings, New Zealand
- Died: 31 March 2022 (aged 76); Waimana, New Zealand
- Resting place: Matahiwi Marae
- Occupation: Lawyer
- Relatives: Everard Jackson (father); Syd Jackson (brother); June Jackson (sister-in-law); Willie Jackson (nephew); Fred Jackson (grandfather)

Moana Jackson CRSNZ (10 October 1945 – 31 March 2022) was a New Zealand lawyer specialising in constitutional law, the Treaty of Waitangi and international indigenous issues. He was an advocate and activist for Māori rights, arguing that the New Zealand criminal justice system was discriminatory and leading work on constitutional reforms. In 1987 he co-founded Ngā Kaiwhakamarama i Ngā Ture (the Māori Legal Service). He also supported the rights of indigenous people internationally – for example, through leading the working group that drafted the United Nations Declaration on the Rights of Indigenous Peoples and sitting as a judge on the International Tribunal of Indigenous Rights in the 1990s.

== Biography ==
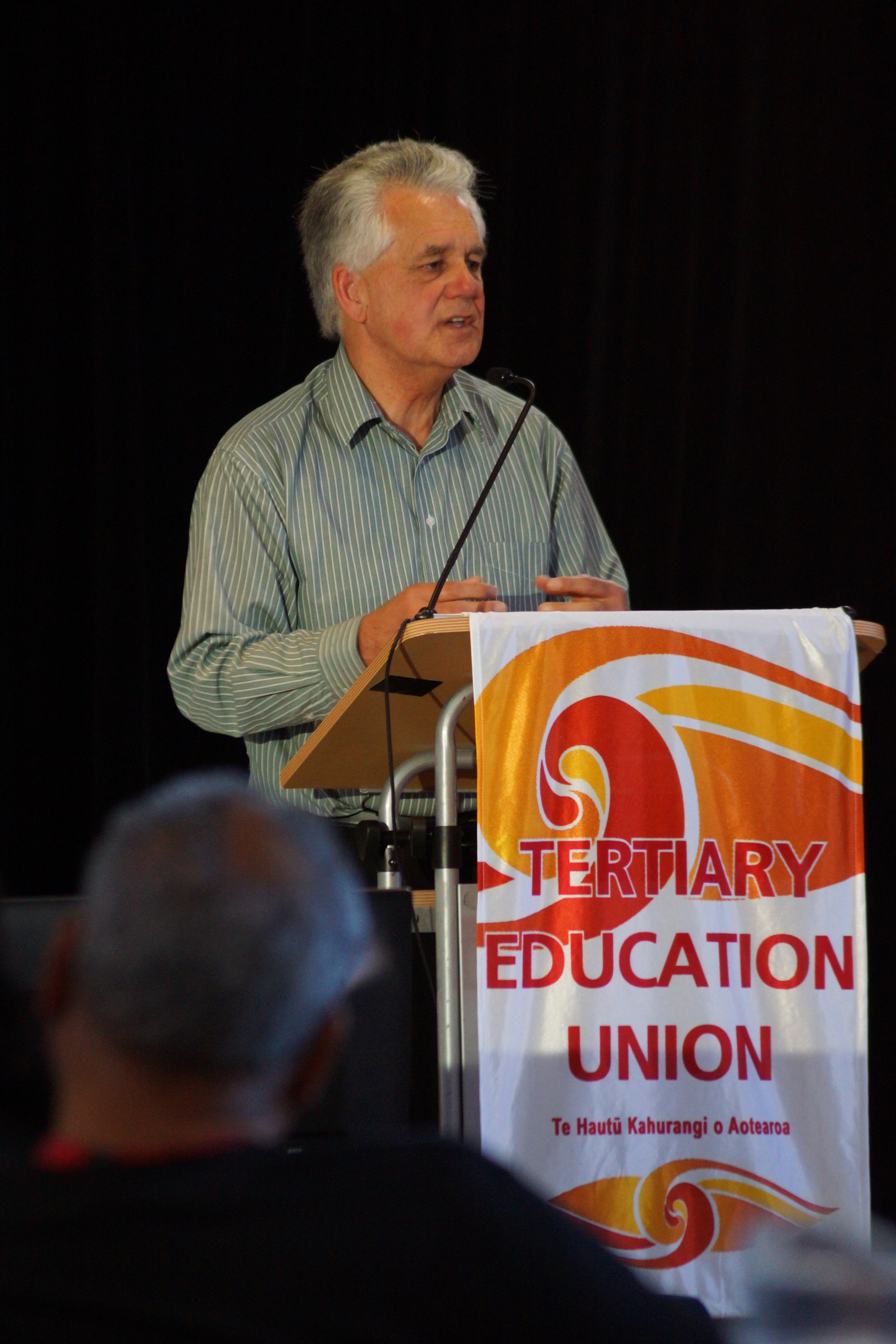
Jackson speaking at a Tertiary Education Union event in 2015

Jackson was born in Hastings, and was one of six children of Everard Jackson, an All Black rugby player, and Hineaka (Janey) Cunningham. His older brother was activist Syd Jackson. He was affiliated with the iwi of Ngāti Kahungunu on his mother's side and Ngāti Porou on his father's side. He attended Mayfair Primary School and Hastings Intermediate, and from 1959 to 1963 he attended Hastings Boys' High School, where he was a prefect in his last year. He graduated in law and criminology at Victoria University of Wellington, and after a short period in practice took up the teaching of the Māori language. He then undertook further study in the United States, attending Arizona State University.

Jackson died on 31 March 2022 at Waimana after a long illness, just three days after his sister-in-law, Dame June Jackson. His tangi (traditional funeral) took place at Matahiwi Marae. He requested that women be able to speak on the marae at his tangi, a role usually reserved for men. On Jackson's death, a number of well-known New Zealanders paid him tribute including Marama Davidson (co-leader of the Green Party), academics Margaret Mutu and Khylee Quince, and writer Tina Makereti. New Zealand's prime minister Jacinda Ardern said:

Moana Jackson was well-known domestically and internationally for his expertise in indigenous issues. He was incredibly generous with his time and sharing of his knowledge, storytelling and gentle approach. He will have left a mark on an entire generation and beyond.

== Career ==
After returning to New Zealand from his study in the United States, Jackson conducted research for the New Zealand Department of Justice. As part of this work he wrote Māori and the Criminal Justice System: A New Perspective, He Whaipaanga Hou published in 1988. In this report he argued that without changes to the criminal justice system Māori people would experience worse outcomes and discrimination. He was the first person to argue that an alternative justice system would be more appropriate for Māori. As of 2022 the report continues to be influential in New Zealand legal policy. In 1987 he co-founded Ngā Kaiwhakamarama i Ngā Ture (the Māori Legal Service) and as of 2021 was a director of the organisation. In 1989 he began preparing a claim to the Waitangi Tribunal supporting Māori rights over native plants and animals. The claim was unique as being made on behalf of all Māori rather than individual iwi. The claim was lodged in 1991 and in its 2011 report the Tribunal concluded that conservation should be co-managed by a partnership between Māori and the Crown.

His overseas work included leading the Indigenous Peoples caucus of the working group that drafted the United Nations Declaration on the Rights of Indigenous Peoples. In 1993 he was a judge on the International Tribunal of Indigenous Rights in Hawaii and again in 1995 in Canada. During the Bougainville peace process Jackson was counsel for the Bougainville Interim Government.

Jackson was a vocal critic of the New Zealand government's foreshore and seabed legislation in 2004. He was also a vocal critic of the October 2007 police 'terror' raids. He resigned as patron of the Police Recruit Wing 244 due to his opposition to how the raids were conducted and his view that they were racially motivated, for example by treating the predominantly Māori community of Ruatoki more harshly than the predominantly Pākehā (New Zealand European) suburb of Brooklyn, Wellington. In 2009 at Omahu Marae in Hastings he said: "Those who take power unjustly defend it with injustice."

In 2016 he led the Matike Mai Aotearoa working group on constitutional reform in New Zealand. The group's report was published on Waitangi Day in 2016, and made a number of recommendations for constitutional change. One recommendation of the report was to develop the ability of Māori to make decisions for Māori, which led to a Māori Constitutional Convention being held in February 2021, at which Jackson gave the keynote speech.

Jackson lectured at Te Wānanga o Raukawa in Ōtaki on the Ahunga Tīkanga (Māori Laws and Philosophy) degree programme. In 1995 he was appointed a visiting fellow in the faculty of law at Victoria University of Wellington. In the early 2010s he chaired a board appointed by the Minister of Education to ensure the survival of Te Aute College, a school with a strong Māori character which was experiencing financial difficulties.

== Views on criminal justice ==
Jackson challenged the role of prisons in the criminal justice system and argued that they should never be the only answer, particularly for indigenous people. He noted that indigenous people traditionally have justice systems that seek to restore "the balance between the wrongdoer and the victim through mediation processes involving sanction and recompense". At a conference in 2018, Jackson said the New Zealand criminal justice system isolates both the perpetrator and the victim from their communities and history. He challenged the notion of one law for all and the Eurocentric approach to crime with the offender viewed as separate from the culture and society they grow up in.

Jackson highlighted the importance of showing positive portrayals of Māori in the media, as the negative portrayal of Māori may damage their self-worth.

== Awards ==
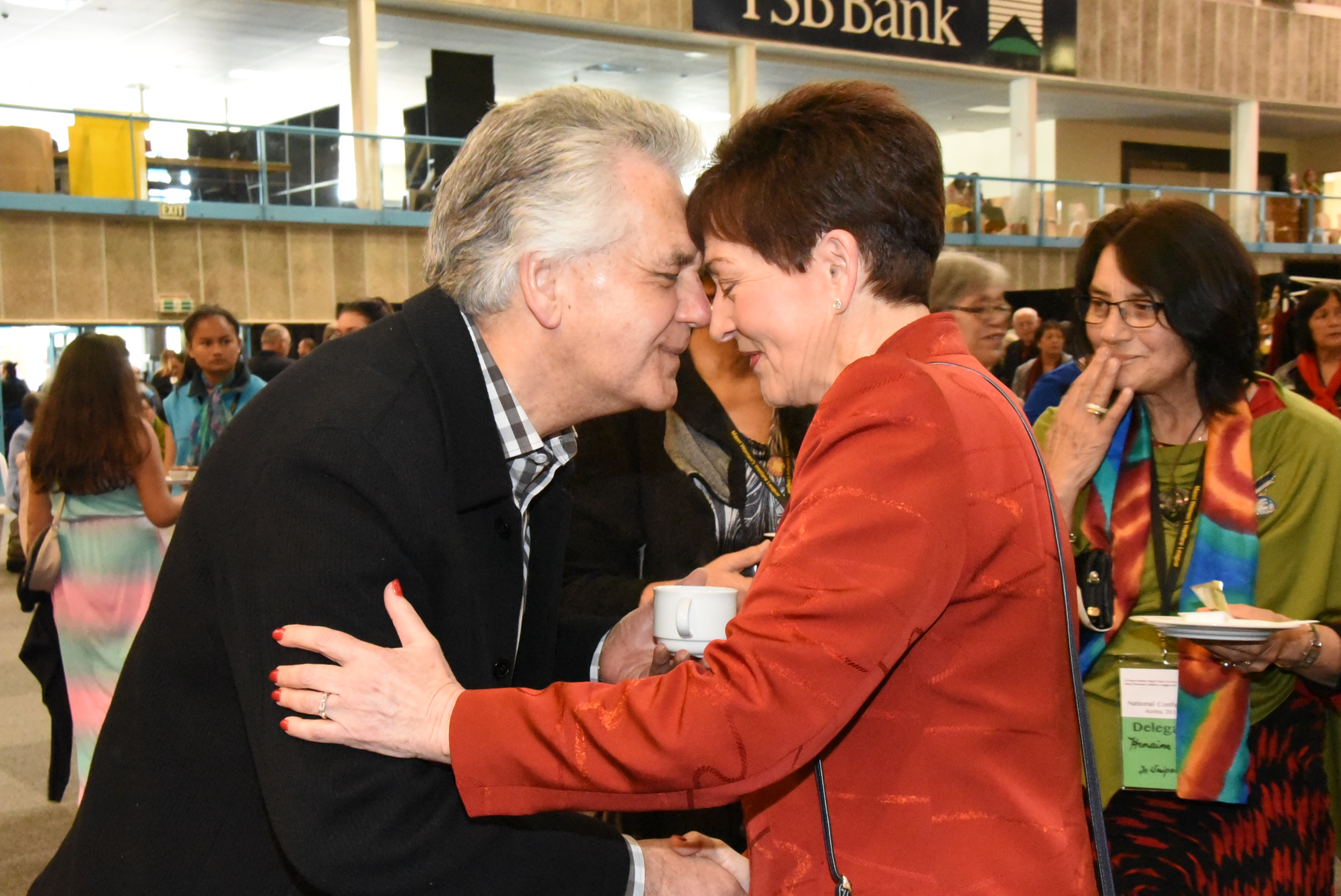
Jackson and the governor-general, Patsy Reddy, hongi at the 2017 Māori Women's Welfare League conference

In 2017 Jackson was awarded an honorary doctorate from Victoria University of Wellington for his outstanding contribution to legal scholarship around the Treaty and to public debates about how Māori are treated by the justice system and their place in New Zealand society more broadly. He refused any formal honours from the New Zealand government, saying he would not accept them unless the Treaty of Waitangi was fully incorporated into New Zealand governance.

In 2021 he was made a Companion of the Royal Society Te Apārangi, recognising his leadership in New Zealand. In May 2021, he was presented with the inaugural Te Whare Pukenga award by the National Iwi Chairs Forum, to recognise his "outstanding contributions as an advocate, facilitator and educator" in relation to the Treaty of Waitangi, human rights and social justice.

== Legacy ==
Composer Robert Wiremu wrote Te Kai a Te Rangatira which set to music speeches by several Māori leaders including Jackson. Written for baritone and chamber ensemble it was commissioned for the IO Festival Kaitaia.

== Selected publications ==
- Jackson, Moana (1987). The Maori and the criminal justice system, a new perspective: He whaipaanga hou. Wellington: Policy and Research Division, Department of Justice.
- Jackson, Moana (1990). "Criminality and the Exclusion of Maori" (PDF). Victoria University of Wellington Law Review. 20: 23.
- Jackson, Moana (1994). "Changing realities: Unchanging trusts" (PDF). Australian Journal of Law and Society. 10: 115.
- Jackson, Moana (2008). "Restoring the nation: Removing the constancy of terror" (PDF). Proceedings of Traditional Knowledge Conference. pp. 27–33.
- Jackson, Moana (2018). "Colonization as myth-making: A case study in Aotearoa". Being Indigenous. Routledge. pp. 89–101. ISBN 978-0-4294-5477-6.
