= 2001 Mana Motuhake leadership election =

- 2 June 2001
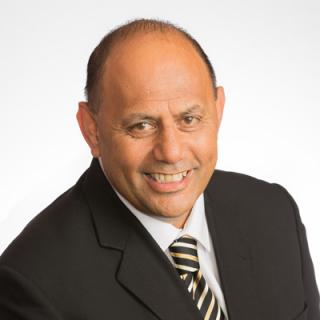

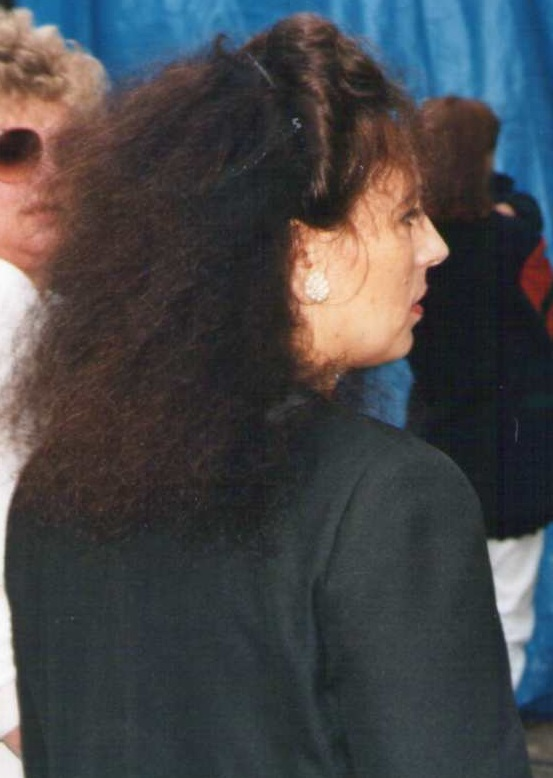
Candidate	Willie Jackson	Sandra Lee
Popular vote	109	35
Percentage	75.69%	24.31%
Leader before election
Sandra Lee
Leader after election
Willie Jackson

The 2001 Mana Motuhake leadership election was held in New Zealand on 2 June 2001 to determine the future leadership of the Mana Motuhake political movement. The election was won by List MP Willie Jackson.

== Background ==
Members of Mana Motuhake were having growing concerns about the Labour-Alliance coalition government's Māori policies and were seriously considering leaving the Alliance (an umbrella party of 5 smaller parties including Mana Motuhake) as a result. Party members were also concerned that Mana Motuhake's identity was becoming subsumed by the Alliance. This led to internal debate around the direction the party was being led, eventually leading Willie Jackson to challenge Sandra Lee for the leadership of the party.

A vote was the first item of business at the party's 2001 annual meeting held in Māngere, South Auckland. After initiating the challenge, Jackson had invited Lee to withdraw her name from the ballot, but she decided against it forcing a ballot from party delegates.

== Candidates ==
=== Sandra Lee ===
Lee had been an MP since 1993 and became Deputy Leader of the Alliance that same year. In 1994 she became leader of Mana Motuhake upon the retirement of party founder Matiu Rata. Questions were also raised over revelations of her personal life which led senior party members to approach her and voice concern that her affair with Te Puni Kokiri adviser Anaru Vercoe was distracting her from the leadership of the party.

=== Willie Jackson ===
Jackson, a List MP since 1999, offered a platform of re-energizing the party, which drew support from many newer party members. Jackson was also highly critical of his party's failure to persuade the Government to do more for Māori and said that Mana Motuhake had become "virtually invisible" under the current leadership. Media also suspected that Jackson was looking for revenge against Lee, who effectively blocked his first attempt to get into Parliament in 1996 when she insisted that Alamein Kopu be ranked ahead of him on the Alliance Party list.

== Result ==
The following table gives the delegate ballot results:

Name	Votes	Percentage
Willie Jackson	109	75.69%
Sandra Lee	35	24.31%

Supporters of Lee later raised questions about the validity of the vote citing concerns over two busloads of "strangers" that were brought in. The claims were refuted by Jackson who labeled the suggestion as "nonsense".

== Aftermath ==
After his victory was announced, Jackson promised to expel life member Nellie Rata (widow of Matiu Rata) for defecting to ACT and pledged to ask Labour to stand aside for Mana Motuhake in at least one Māori seat at the next election in 2002, a scenario that Labour leader Helen Clark refused to do stating that Labour dealt with the Alliance, not Mana Motuhake. Jackson also affirmed to the media that he had no intention of leading Mana Motuhake away from either the Alliance or the coalition Government.

Lee said that her duties as Alliance Deputy Leader and as a cabinet minister allowed her less time to devote to Mana Motuhake's activities and organisational matters which counted against her in the ballot. She stated "Unfortunately, I didn't have the numbers on the day and that's politics in a democracy" and also pledged to continue ensuring Mana Motuhake's committal to continuing an active role within the coalition government.

Alliance leader Jim Anderton publicly voiced his support for Lee, saying "it was Ms Lee's patience and long-term view which had got Mana Motuhake into government".
