= Sandra Lee-Vercoe =

New Zealand politician

The Honourable Sandra Lee-Vercoe QSO
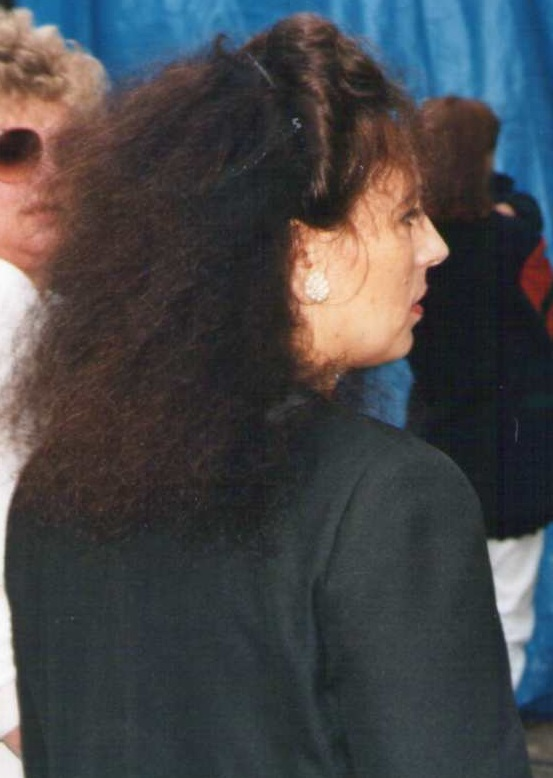
- Lee in the 1990s

10th Minister of Local Government
- In office 10 December 1999 – 15 August 2002
- Prime Minister: Helen Clark
- Preceded by: Jack Elder
- Succeeded by: Chris Carter

7th Minister of Conservation
- In office 10 December 1999 – 15 August 2002
- Prime Minister: Helen Clark
- Preceded by: Nick Smith
- Succeeded by: Chris Carter

2nd Leader of the Alliance
- In office 11 November 1994 – 7 May 1995
- Preceded by: Jim Anderton
- Succeeded by: Jim Anderton

Member of the New Zealand Parliament for Alliance list
- In office 12 October 1996 – 27 July 2002

Member of the New Zealand Parliament for Auckland Central
- In office 6 November 1993 – 12 October 1996
- Preceded by: Richard Prebble
- Succeeded by: Judith Tizard

Personal details
- Born: 8 August 1952 (age 74) Wellington, New Zealand
- Party: Mana Motuhake (1979–2002); Alliance (1991–2002)

Sandra Rose Te Hakamatua Lee-Vercoe QSO (born 8 August 1952) is a New Zealand former politician and diplomat. She served as deputy leader (and briefly leader) of the Alliance party and was later High Commissioner to Niue.

== Early life ==
Lee was born in Wellington to an English Romani father and a Māori mother, and grew up in a two bedroom Māori Affairs house with her parents, grandfather and great grandfather. She was educated at Onslow College. Lee later moved to Auckland, settling on Waiheke Island. Her involvement in politics began with the foundation of Mana Motuhake, a Māori issues party, in 1979. Her political career, however, did not begin until 1983, with her election to the Waiheke County Council. She became chairperson of the Council in 1989. When Waiheke was amalgamated into Auckland proper, Lee became a member of the Auckland City Council. In 1990, she was awarded the New Zealand 1990 Commemoration Medal.

Lee connects to Ngāi Tahu and Ngāti Kahungunu.

== Member of Parliament ==
New Zealand Parliament
Years	Term	Electorate	List	Party
1993–1996	44th	Auckland Central		Alliance
1996–1999	45th	List	2	Alliance
1999–2002	46th	List	2	Alliance

In 1991, Lee became president of Mana Motuhake. Shortly after this, Mana Motuhake agreed to become a founding member of the Alliance, a coalition of minor parties. At the 1992 Alliance party conference Lee was elected the co-leader of the party alongside Jeanette Fitzsimons.

In the 1993 election, Lee became the first Māori woman to win a general seat (James Carroll being the first man in 1893) when she successfully contested the Auckland Central electorate as an Alliance candidate, defeating the incumbent Richard Prebble. Upon the retirement of Mana Motuhake founder Matiu Rata in 1994, Lee became Mana Motuhake's political leader. On 10 November 1994, Jim Anderton stepped down as leader of the Alliance for personal reasons, with Lee being elected leader the following day. Nevertheless, Lee persuaded Anderton to return to the leadership in May 1995. Lee lost her Auckland Central seat to Labour's Judith Tizard at the 1996 election.

=== Cabinet member ===
When a Labour-Alliance coalition government was formed after the 1999 election, Lee became Minister of Local Government, Minister of Conservation, and Associate Minister of Māori Affairs. She was ranked seventh in Cabinet. During her time as Minister of Conservation Lee was known as an outspoken opponent of commercial whaling.

As Minister of Local Government, Lee oversaw significant reform including the development and passage of the Local Electoral Act 2001, and the development and introduction of the Local Government Act 2002 and Local Government (Rating) Act 2002.

She lost the position as Mana Motuhake leader in 2001, after a leadership challenge by Willie Jackson. Lee believed that personal matters pertaining to her, such as her relationship with Te Puni Kōkiri staffer Anaru Vercoe, were used to discredit her as leader of Mana Motuhake. Commentators also noted there was an element of revenge by Jackson, as he had been demoted in the 1996 party list in order to make room for Alamein Kopu, who had been elevated in the party list upon Lee's persuasion.

=== Retirement ===
By the end of her term in parliament, the Alliance began to divide between Jim Anderton's moderate faction (including Lee) that held most of the parliamentary power, and the strongly left-wing faction, represented by most rank-and-file members and party president Matt McCarten and four of the Alliance MPs (including Laila Harré). The latter accused Anderton (and by extension, Lee) of moving the Alliance too close to Labour and not being distinct enough. The Alliance had fallen below the 5% threshold in polls. By March 2002, tensions had gotten so bad that McCarten and Lee had a 'swearing match' at a meeting in the Alliance's Wellington premises.

On 3 April 2002, both Anderton and Lee announced their refusal to stand under the Alliance banner at the 2002 election. Anderton went on to form the Progressive Coalition while Harré led the Alliance into the election (which saw them knocked out of parliament), but Lee did not stand and retired from politics that year.

Lee-Vercoe has continued to be politically active by being a guest commentator on issues affecting Māori and New Zealand on Te Karere, Breakfast, Native Affairs and Radio Waatea. Her career as a parliamentarian was honoured and highlighted in the Matangireia documentary series, released in 2019, that documented former Māori politicians and their legacy.

== Diplomatic career ==
Lee was High Commissioner to Niue, representing the New Zealand government, from 12 February 2003 to 3 October 2005. In the 2004 New Year Honours, she was appointed a Companion of the Queen's Service Order for public services.

== Board member ==
In September 2006, Lee was appointed to the board of Housing New Zealand. In July 2007, she was appointed to the board of Te Papa Tongarewa.

== Political offices ==
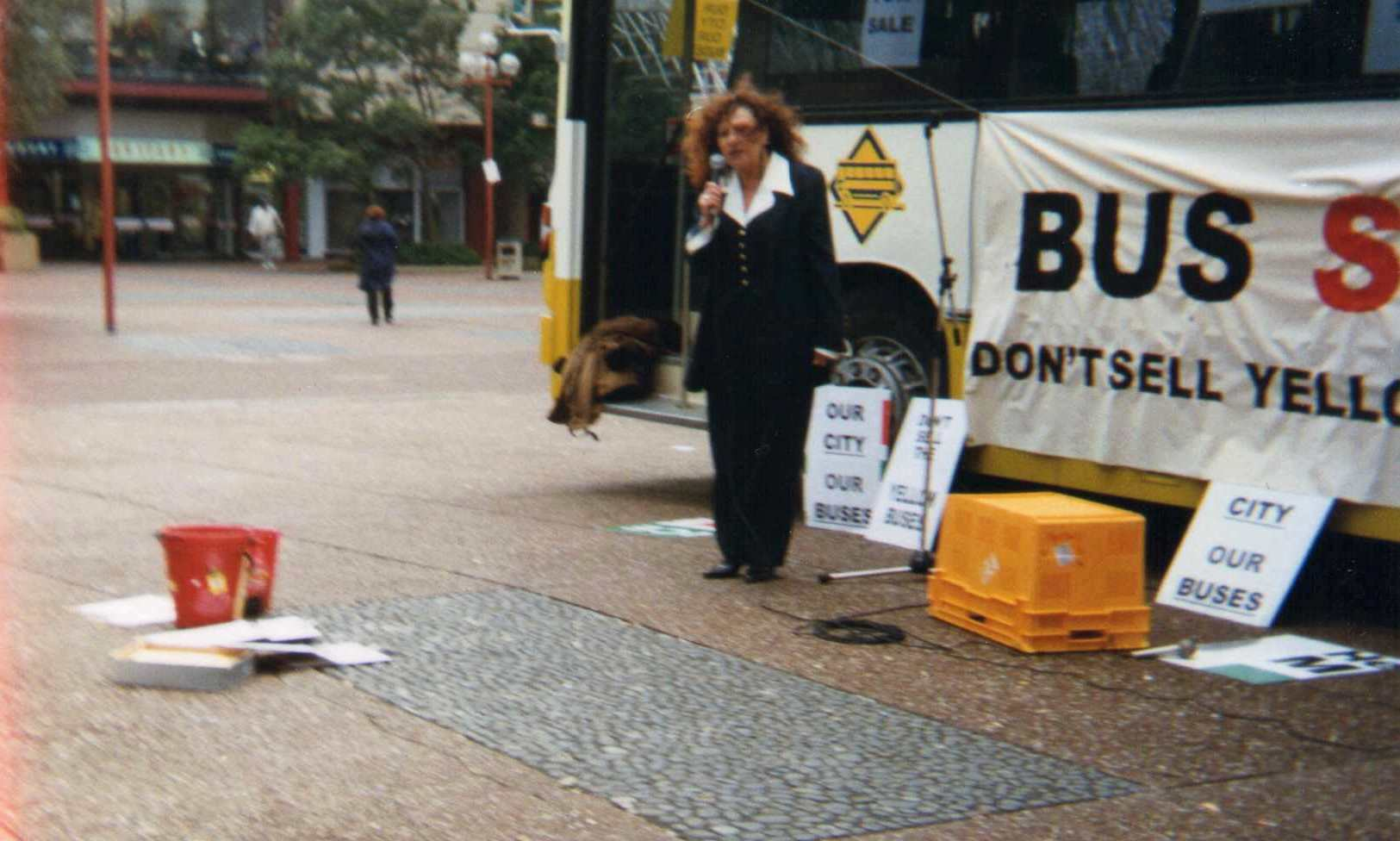
Lee campaigning in central Auckland

- 1983–1989: Member, Waiheke County Council
- 1989: Chair, Waiheke County Council
- 1989–1994 (January): Councillor, Auckland City Council
- 1993–1996: Member of Parliament (Alliance), Auckland Central
- 1996–2002: Member of Parliament (List) (Alliance)
- 1999 (December) – 2002: Minister of the Crown (Local Government, Conservation, Associate Māori Affairs), Labour-Alliance government

== Personal life ==
At age 16, Lee married Mike Lee, giving birth to their eldest daughter, Michelle-Rose Lee, at age 17. They separated in 1992. She has been married to Anaru Vercoe since 2002.

Michelle Lee, MArtDes(Hons), is an international award winning New Zealand television producer, academic and educationalist.

New Zealand journalist and television producer, Annabelle Lee-Mather, is Lee's youngest daughter.

== List ==
New Zealand Parliament
Preceded by Richard Prebble	Member of Parliament for Auckland Central; 1993–1996	Succeeded by Judith Tizard
Political offices
Preceded by Jack Elder	Minister of Local Government; 1999–2002	Succeeded by Chris Carter
Preceded by Nick Smith	Minister of Conservation; 1999–2002	Succeeded by Chris Carter
Party political offices
New political party	Deputy Leader of the Alliance; 1992–1994 1995–2002; Served alongside: Jeanette Fitzsimons	Succeeded by Jeanette Fitzsimons
Preceded by Jeanette Fitzsimons	Deputy Leader of the Alliance; 1992–1994 1995–2002; Served alongside: Jeanette Fitzsimons	Succeeded by Willie Jackson
Preceded by Matiu Rata	Leader of Mana Motuhake; 1994–2001	Succeeded by Willie Jackson
Preceded by Jim Anderton	Leader of the Alliance; 1994–1995	Succeeded by Jim Anderton
