= Aotearoa New Zealand Public Media =

Proposed New Zealand public media entity

Aotearoa New Zealand Public Media (ANZPM) was a proposed public media entity consisting of the New Zealand public broadcasters Radio New Zealand (RNZ) and TVNZ. After exploring the merger of the two media entities in February 2020, the New Zealand Cabinet formally decided to create the new media entity in February 2022. The Sixth Labour Government introduced legislation to create ANZPM on 23 June 2022, with plans for the organisation to be legally established on 1 March 2023. On 8 February 2023, Prime Minister Chris Hipkins, who succeeded Jacinda Ardern earlier in January 2023, announced that the proposed media entity and the merger of RNZ and TVNZ would be scrapped.

== History ==
=== Background ===
During the 2017 New Zealand general election, the Labour Party campaigned on expanding public broadcaster Radio New Zealand's (RNZ) services. Following the resignation of Clare Curran as Minister of Broadcasting, her successor Kris Faafoi consulted an advisory group consisting of representatives from media companies and public service agencies to explore options for public broadcasting in New Zealand. By mid November 2019, the advisory group had identified three options: merging RNZ and TVNZ's newsrooms, allocating more funding to New Zealand On Air, and merging RNZ and TVNZ into a new public media entity.

In January 2020, the New Zealand Cabinet considered a proposal to strengthen public media by merging the two public broadcasting services RNZ and TVNZ into a new public media entity. In March 2021, the Government also commissioned an expert group to produce a business case exploring the viability of merging the two media organisations, which was released on 26 August 2021. The expert group supported the Government's merger proposal to create a new non-profit public media entity with a clear mandate and purpose.

On 9 March 2022, The New Zealand Herald reported that Cabinet had approved a plan that would see both Radio New Zealand and TVNZ disestablished to create a new entity. Under this new structure, former RNZ properties such as RNZ National, Concert, and RNZ News would remain commercial free while TVNZ's properties would receive some commercial funding but would be exempt from paying a dividend to the Government. The new entity would be a not-for-profit model with a public interest emphasis.

On 10 March, Faafoi confirmed that the Government would set up a new board to establish ANZPM. The board would be tasked with ensuring that the new entity fulfilled several obligations including adhering to the Treaty of Waitangi, collaborating with Māori media to promote Māori storytelling and broadcasting, promoting diversity and representation, broadcasting across the Pacific Ocean, and producing content in Pacific languages, the Māori language, and English. While RNZ chief executive Paul Thompson expressed support for the Government's public media expansion plans, the opposition National Party's broadcasting spokesperson Melissa Lee described the merger project as wasteful and claimed that it would lead to "fewer voices" in New Zealand's media.

=== Legislative entrenchment ===
In mid-June 2022, Broadcasting Minister Willie Jackson introduced the draft Aotearoa New Zealand Public Media Bill to formally merge Radio New Zealand and TVNZ into a new public media entity called Aotearoa New Zealand Public Media. The new entity will be a non-profit autonomous Crown entity and is expected to come into existence on 1 March 2023. Under the proposed legislation, RNZ and TVNZ would become subsidiaries of the new entity, headed by a single board. The ANZPM would be supported through a mixture of commercial and government funding. The ANZPM would also operate under a charter outlining goals and responsibilities, with editorial independence being enshrined in its statutory legislation. The Government also allocated NZ$370m over a period of four years in operating expenditure and $306m in capital funding from the 2022 New Zealand budget to supporting the new public media entity.

On 26 July 2022, the Government's Aotearoa New Zealand Public Media Bill passed its first reading at the New Zealand Parliament. The Labour, Green, and Māori parties supported the legislation. The bill's sponsor Jackson claimed that the bill would allow public media to keep delivering for future generations while combating misinformation in increasingly competitive media environment. The opposition National and ACT parties opposed the bill, claiming that it would lead to less diversity within the New Zealand media landscape and also questioned its independence from the Government. The Public Media Bill was referred to Parliament's Economic Development, Science and Innovation select committee, with a six-month period for people to make submissions regarding the bill.

By early October 2022, the Aotearoa New Zealand Public Media Bill had received 980 submissions. Submissions supporting the new public media entity claimed that it would strengthen public media while submissions opposing the legislation claimed that the new media entity could distort the media market, undermine commercial competitors, and be subject to political interference. TVNZ CEO Simon Power and RNZ CEO Paul Thompson supported the new proposed public media entity but expressed concerns about its editorial independence and public trust. Thompson regarded ANZPM as an opportunity to rebuild the country's public media mandate within a "volatile" media market where global platforms operated with "unbridled power."

Commercial media companies including Stuff, MediaWorks New Zealand, and Warner Bros. Discovery expressed concerns that the merged public media entity could undercut their operations. In addition, New Zealand Media and Entertainment editor Shayne Currie and MediaWorks CEO Cam Wallace called for a thorough cost-benefit analysis of the proposed media entity.

Prior to the cancellation of the public media merger in February 2023, the Government had initially set 1 March as a deadline for passing the Bill into law, with the new entity becoming fully operational in July 2023. His successor Jackson subsequently confirmed that the Government wanted the Bill passed by 1 July 2023.

=== Merger process and controversy ===
In late September 2022, Broadcasting Minister Jackson defended plans to merge RNZ and TVNZ on the grounds that the public no longer trusted the media. That same month, Myles Thomas of Better Public Media defended merger process on the grounds that the new public media entity needed to focus on serving audiences rather than fulfilling a commercial goal like the current TVNZ.

On 15 October, former New Zealand First cabinet minister Tracey Martin, who was leading the RNZ-TVNZ merger process, defended the Government's decision not to conduct a cost-benefit analysis of the merger process. Earlier, the National Party's broadcasting and media spokesperson Melissa Lee had questioned Jackson on whether there had been no regulatory impact statement or cost benefit analysis of the RNZ-TVNZ merger process, which was estimated to cost NZ$370 million. Jackson later confirmed that the Government had not conducted a cost benefit analysis on the grounds it was unnecessary.

On 22 October, Lee confirmed that the National Party would reverse the Government's proposed merger of RNZ and TVNZ on the grounds that it lacked widespread support and could reduce public trust in the media. Lee also claimed that a majority of the under 1,000 submissions were opposed to the merger process. Lee suggested that a National-led government would investing in helping local media create more local content. In addition, ACT's associate finance spokesman Damien Smith opposed the RNZ-TVNZ merger process on the grounds that the public was preoccupied with the "cost of living crisis" caused by rising inflation.

By 15 November, RNZ and TVNZ had spent a total of NZ$1,023,701 on the public media merger project; with TVNZ spending NZ$592,424 between 1 March and 31 October 2022 and RNZ spending NZ$431,277. At the time, Jackson estimated that the merger process would be completed by July 2023. National's broadcasting spokesperson Lee stated that her party would reveal the proposed merger if they were elected into power at the upcoming 2023 New Zealand general election.

In December 2022, Jackson defended the public media merger process during a heated televised interview with TVNZ journalist Jack Tame on TVNZ's Q+A Show. Jackson defended the ANZPM's commitment to editorial independence and questioned the motives and impartiality of his host. In response, Prime Minister Jacinda Ardern expressed disagreement with Jackson's remarks but defended his competence as Minister of Broadcasting. By contrast, National's broadcasting spokesperson Lee described Jackson's interview as a "trainwreck" and accused Jackson of interfering with ANZPM's culture, operations and decisions.

Jackson subsequently apologised for his conduct during the interview but defended the proposed public media entity and accused the New Zealand media of fomenting opposition to the merger effort. Supporters of the new public media entity including journalist Claudette Hauiti defended Jackson's conduct during the TVNZ interview. Hauiti argued that certain minorities including Māori, Pasifika and 'tāngata whaikaha' (people with disabilities) were not getting adequate coverage within the current media environment. She also claimed that TVNZ lacked the trust of Māori due to the elimination of their Māori Programmes and Pasifika departments and their Māori language news service Te Karere.

=== Public opinion ===
In November 2022, a public opinion poll conducted by the New Zealand Taxpayers' Union and Curia found 22% supported the RNZ/TVNZ merger, 54% opposed merging the two state broadcasters, and 24% were unsure.

By contrast, a Research NZ poll commissioned by Better Public Media found that 44% supported the RNZ/TVNZ merger, 29% opposed the merger, and 26% did not know. The Research NZ poll was conducted between 15 and 19 December 2022 and relied on a nationally representative sample of 1,000 individuals.

On 31 January 2023, a 1News–Kantar public opinion poll found that 28% of respondents supported the RNZ/TVNZ merger, 41% opposed the merger, and 31% were unsure.

=== Scrapping ===
On 8 February 2023, Prime Minister Chris Hipkins announced that the merger of TVNZ and RNZ would "stop entirely" due to the Government shifting its focus to "cost of living issues." Hipkins confirmed that the leftover money would be redirected. He also confirmed that the two public broadcasters would receive additional funding to support their operations including NZ$10 million for Radio New Zealand. Hipkins also confirmed that the Broadcasting Minister Faafoi would explore options for funding a way to reach underserved audiences.

In early April 2023, Radio New Zealand reported that the cancelled public media merger had cost NZ$19.6 million. NZ$12 million of this amount went to contractors and consultants. NZ$2.6 million went to offices and overheads while NZ$3 million went to compensate TVNZ, Radio NZ, and New Zealand On Air.
