= Everard Jackson =

- Born: Everard Stanley Jackson; 12 January 1914 Hastings, New Zealand
- Died: 20 September 1975 (aged 61) Hastings, New Zealand
- Height: 1.80 m (5 ft 11 in)
- Weight: 83 kg (183 lb)
- School: Rerekohu District High School
- Notable relative(s): Fred Jackson (father); Moana Jackson (son); Syd Jackson (son); June Jackson (daughter-in-law); Willie Jackson (grandson)

Rugby union career
- Position: Prop
Provincial / State sides
Years	Team	Apps	(Points)
1932–33	East Coast		
1934–40	Hawke's Bay		
1941	Wellington		
International career
Years	Team	Apps	(Points)
1936–38	New Zealand	6	(0)
1938	New Zealand Māori		

Everard Stanley Jackson (12 January 1914 – 20 September 1975) was a New Zealand rugby union player. A prop, Jackson represented East Coast, Hawke's Bay and Wellington at a provincial level, and was a member of the New Zealand national side, the All Blacks, from 1936 to 1938. He played 11 matches (including six internationals) for the All Blacks. He also played for New Zealand Māori in 1936.

He was selected by the editors of the 1937 Rugby Almanac of New Zealand as one of their 5 players of the year.

Jackson was the son of British-born rugby player Fred Jackson, and Horowai Jackson (née Henderson) from Te Araroa. Horowai was the daughter of Everard Hannon Henderson, a British man, and his wife Kamaea Ngatoko of Ngāti Porou. Everard Jackson married Hineaka (Janey) Cunningham of Ngāti Kahungunu in Hastings in 1938. They had six children, Phil, Fred, Moana, Jacqui, Bob and Syd. Jackson also had another son, Bill Nepia. Bob Jackson married June Jackson, née Batley, and they were the parents of Willie Jackson.

During World War II, Jackson served as an officer in the 28th (Māori) Battalion, and lost a leg as a result of wounds received in an artillery barrage.
