= Mana Motuhake =

Defunct Māori political party in New Zealand

- Founder: Matiu Rata
- Founded: 1980
- Dissolved: 2005
- Split from: Labour Party
- Merged into: Māori Party
- Ideology: Māori rights
- National affiliation: Alliance
- Colors: Black, red and white

Mana Māori Motuhake was a Māori political party in New Zealand from 1980 to 2005. The name is difficult to translate accurately, but essentially refers to Māori self-rule and self-determination — mana, in this context, can be understood as "authority" or "power", while motuhake can be understood as "independent" or "separate". The purpose of the party was to unify Māori to gain 'political potency'. From 1991 to 2002, the party participated in the left-wing Alliance.

== History ==
=== Early years ===
Mana Motuhake was formed in 1980 by Matiu Rata, a former Labour Party member of parliament who had served as Minister of Māori Affairs in the third Labour government (1972–1975). Rata had grown increasingly dissatisfied with Labour Party policy. Eventually deciding that Māori needed an independent voice, he announced his intention to resign from Labour on 6 November 1979. He announced that he would promote a movement based on "mana Māori motuhake". At Easter 1980, he launched the Mana Motuhake party, and resigned his seat in Parliament to contest a by-election under its banner. In the resulting Northern Maori by-election of 1980, Rata was defeated by the Labour Party's new candidate, Bruce Gregory.

Mana Motuhake stood candidates in the 1981, 1984, 1987, and 1990 general elections, but was unsuccessful on each occasion.

In 1991 Mana Motuhake formed a new party called the Alliance by joining with three other political parties NewLabour Party, the Green Party, and the Democratic Party. Some in Mana Motuhake considered this move to take away the freedom of the party to speak up for Māori. There was a split and an independent Māori party led by Eva Rickard was founded called Mana Māori.

=== From the 1990s to deregistration ===
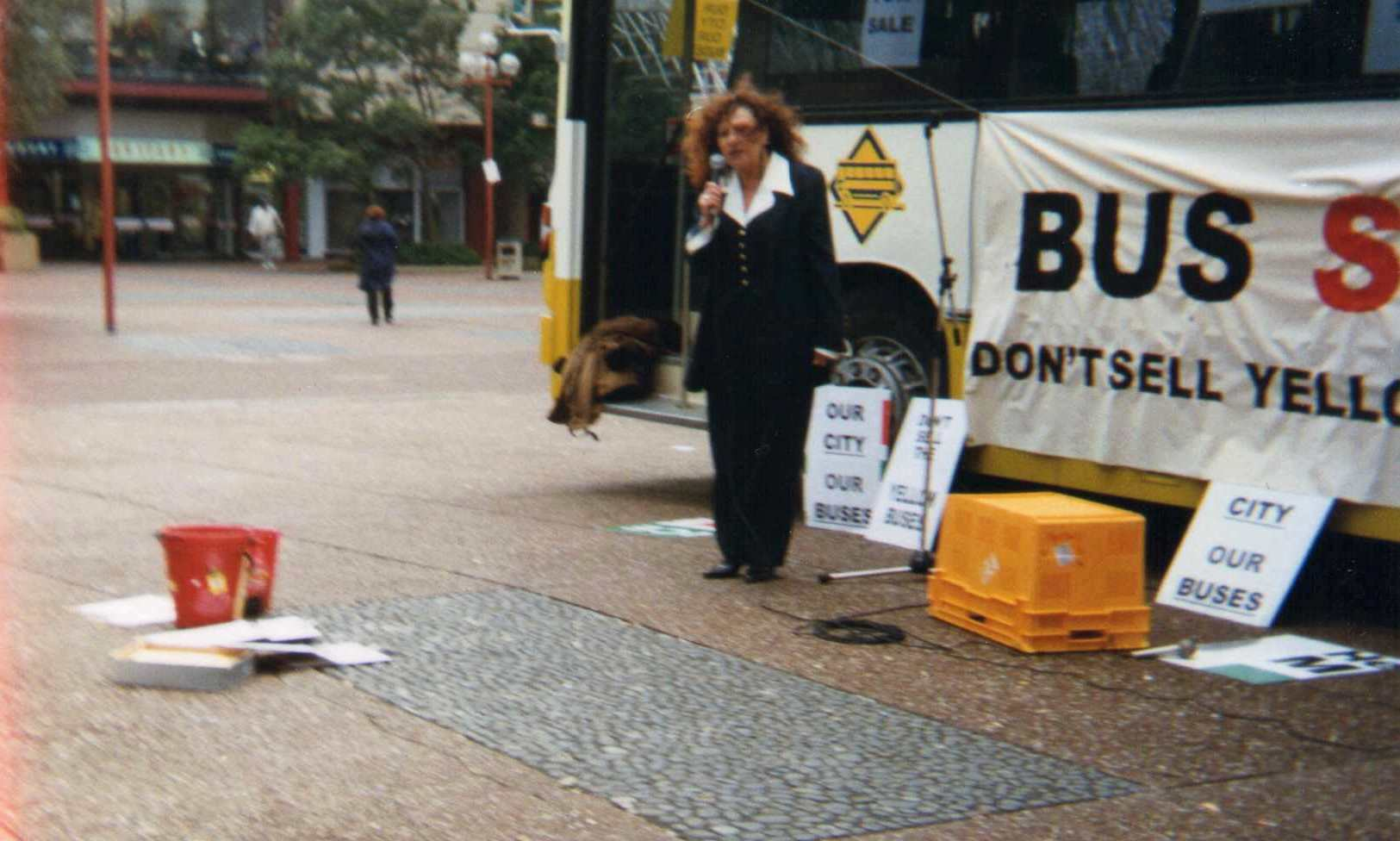
Mana Motuhake leader Sandra Lee (pictured circa 1997–98).

In the 1993 elections, a Mana Motuhake candidate, Sandra Lee-Vercoe, was elected to Parliament under the Alliance banner. When Rata retired the following year, Lee-Vercoe became Mana Motuhake's political leader. With the introduction of the MMP electoral system in the 1996 elections, Lee-Vercoe was joined in Parliament by Alamein Kopu. Kopu, however, eventually left the party, founding her own Mana Wahine Te Ira Tangata party. In the 1999 elections, another Mana Motuhake candidate, Willie Jackson, entered Parliament as an Alliance MP. In 2001, Jackson successfully challenged Lee-Vercoe for leadership of the party.

In April 2002, Lee-Vercoe announced her refusal to stand for election under the Alliance, and ultimately retired from Parliament. The Alliance split due to internal tensions over funding and their relationship with Labour and leader Jim Anderton left to create the Progressive Coalition. Mana Motuhake opted to stay with the rump Alliance, led by Laila Harré.

At the time of the July 2002 election, the Alliance only polled at 1-2% of popular support, and their representation was contingent on Harré winning Waitakere and Jackson winning Tainui, with both candidates topping the party list. However, both finished second in their respective electorates and the Alliance failed to reach the party vote threshold, meaning Mana Motuhake was left without representation in Parliament. Shortly afterwards, it left the Alliance.

Mana Motuhake confirmed its decision to leave the Alliance and will attempt to form a broad-based Māori party before the next election, with advice from Alliance president Matt McCarten. (Audrey Young, New Zealand Herald 13 Oct 2002)

Mana Motuhake was deregistered in 2005.

== Election results ==
The following table summarises the party's support in general elections:

Election	candidates	seats won	votes	percentage
1981	4	0	8,332	0.46%
1984	8	0	5,989	0.31%
1987	7	0	9,789	0.53%
1990	4	0	10,869	0.60%

== Leaders ==
- Matiu Rata (1980–1994)
- Sandra Lee (1994–2001)
- Willie Jackson (2001–2003)

== Sources ==
- Hill, Richard S. (2009). Māori and the State: Crown-Māori relations in New Zealand/Aotearoa, 1950-2000. Wellington: Victoria University Press. ISBN 9780864736116.
- Norton, Clifford (1988). New Zealand Parliamentary Election Results 1946–1987: Occasional Publications No 1, Department of Political Science. Wellington: Victoria University of Wellington. ISBN 0-475-11200-8.
