= June Jackson =

New Zealand Māori activist and public servant (1939–2022)

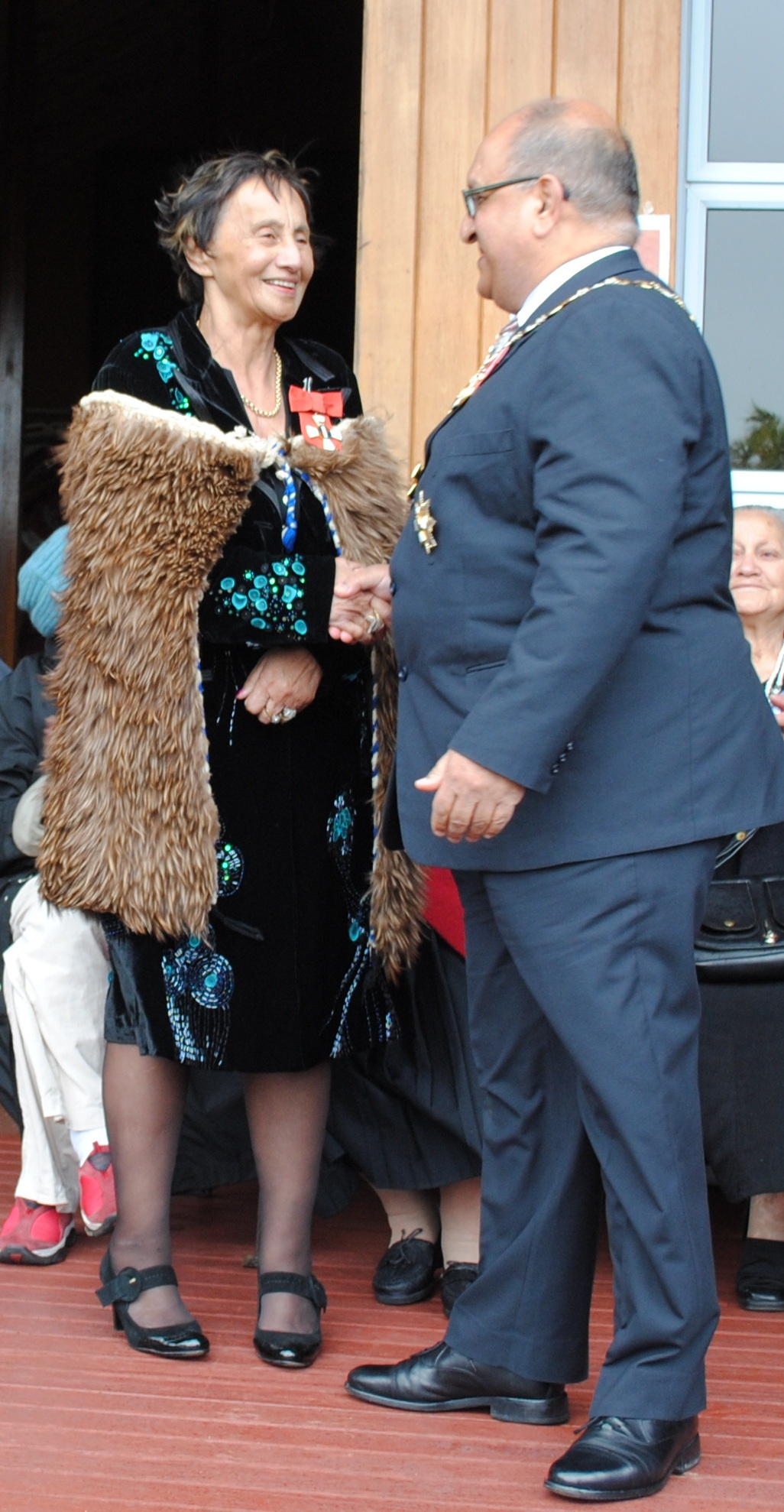
Jackson (left) being congratulated by the governor-general, Sir Anand Satyanand, after her investiture as a Dame Companion of the New Zealand Order of Merit at Ngā Whare Wātea Marae, Māngere, on 18 September 2010

Dame Temuranga Batley-Jackson DNZM QSO (née Batley; 24 August 1939 – 28 March 2022), known as June Jackson, was a New Zealand community worker and public servant.

== Birth and early years ==
Born Temuranga Batley to Barney and Huinga Batley, she grew up in Mahoenui in the King Country as a member of the Ngāti Maniapoto tribe. She moved to Wellington in her late teens. In 1971 she moved from Porirua to Māngere, Auckland.

== Career and awards ==
She was chief executive officer of the Manukau Urban Māori Authority from 1986 to 2009, and a member of the New Zealand Parole Board from 1991 until her death.

In 1990, Jackson received the New Zealand 1990 Commemoration Medal. She was one of 544 recipients of the New Zealand Suffrage Centennial Medal in 1993. In the 1996 Queen's Birthday Honours, she was appointed a Companion of the Queen's Service Order for public services. In the 2010 Birthday Honours, Jackson was appointed Dame Companion of the New Zealand Order of Merit, for services to Māori.

== Personal life and death ==
In 1959 Jackson married Robert "Bob" Jackson, a son of Everard Jackson. Together they had three children, including the politician and broadcaster Willie Jackson. Jackson died in Taumarunui on 28 March 2022 at the age of 82. Her brother-in-law, Moana Jackson, died three days later.
