= Frederick Stanley Jackson =

British rugby union & NZ international rugby league player

Fred Jackson
Personal information
- Full name: Frederick Stanley Jackson
- Born: Ivor Thomas Gape; 24 August 1877 Morriston, Swansea, Wales
- Died: 10 March 1957 (aged 79) Auckland, New Zealand

Playing information
- Weight: 102 kg (16 st 1 lb)

Rugby union
- Position: Prop
Club
Years	Team	Pld	T	G	FG	P
	Morriston
	York (Note: Jackson, then known as Gabe, played rugby union for York prior to their changing to a professional rugby league club in 1898.)
	Camborne
	Plymouth
	Leicester
	Total	0	0	0	0	0
Representative
Years	Team	Pld	T	G	FG	P
1908	Anglo-Welsh Lions	1	0	1	0	2
1902–07	Cornwall	16

Rugby league
- Position: Prop, Second-row
Club
Years	Team	Pld	T	G	FG	P
1901–02	Swinton	15	1	0	0	3
1910	North Shore Albions (ARL)	7	1	0	0	3
	Total	22	2	0	0	6
Representative
Years	Team	Pld	T	G	FG	P
1910	Auckland	1	0	0	0	0
1910	New Zealand	1	0	4	0	8
- Other names: Ivor Gabe; Jack Jones
- Relatives: Rhys Gabe (cousin); Everard Jackson (son); Moana Jackson (grandson); Syd Jackson (son)

Frederick Stanley Jackson (born Ivor Thomas Gape; (Note: Often spelled as Gabe.) 24 August 1877 – 10 March 1957) was a British-New Zealand rugby footballer of the early 1900s.

Jackson played internationally for the Anglo-Welsh Lions in rugby union and the New Zealand Kiwis in rugby league. While representing for the former in 1908, he was the subject of controversy regarding his professional status.

== Early life ==
Jackson was born as Ivor Thomas Gape in Morriston, Wales. His mother's maiden name was Jones. The family's surname was often also spelled as "Gabe." Jackson was a cousin of Welsh rugby union player Rhys Gape or Gabe.

In 1899, the South Wales Daily Post published a letter received from Private Ivor Gabe, who was serving with the 9th Lancers in South Africa and previously with the 17th Lancers. In March 1900, it was reported that Gabe had been injured at Koodoosberg after his horse was shot and fell on his leg.

== Playing career ==
=== Early years ===
Using the name Ivor Gabe, Jackson played rugby union for his hometown Morriston and for York.

=== Covert switch to rugby league ===
It was alleged in 1908 that Jackson used the alias "John Jones" to play rugby league professionally for Swinton during the 1901–02 Northern Rugby Football Union season. The Moseley club produced a statement from Swinton officials asserting that they recognised a photograph of Jackson with the Cornwall team as the same man they knew as Jones in Swinton.

The Bradford Daily Argus had indicated in March 1902 that "Jack Jones" was believed to be the pseudonym of an unnamed Welsh player.

=== Return to rugby union, representative honours ===
Jackson returned to rugby union, playing for Camborne RFC, Plymouth, and Leicester, and earning 16 caps for Cornwall. During this period, Jackson claimed to have been born at Camborne and educated at Camborne School of Mines.

Jackson was Leicester's leading scorer in the 1906–07 season, and was the star of Cornwall's championship-winning side in 1908 when he led the way in the 17–3 final victory over Durham in front of 17,000 spectators at Redruth R.F.C.'s Recreation Ground.

In 1906, Jackson was suspected of professionalism, forcing Leicester secretary Tom Crumbie to admit that Jackson's true identity was Ivor Gabe. However, Jackson's use of an alias was not itself a breach of rugby union's rules for amateurism.

Jackson earned selected in A.F. Harding's Anglo-Welsh Lions team for their tour to Australia and New Zealand in 1908. He was considered the tourists' best forward and played in the first Test against New Zealand on 6 June 1908.

Following the first Test, Jackson was suspended and recalled from the tour to be investigated by the Rugby Football Union for professionalism; a telegram arrived in Wellington on 25 June, reading "Jackson suspended. Return him forthwith." Leaving his close friend and Leicester teammate John Jackett in tears on the wind-swept dockside, he sailed to Sydney on the Maitai but, for whatever reason, Jackson decided he could not return to England and slipped back to New Zealand unannounced. The New Zealand Herald reported in October 1908 that Jackson was in Dunedin, learning of the dredging industry.

=== Rugby league in New Zealand ===
Jackson played rugby league for both Auckland and New Zealand in 1910, captaining Auckland against the touring Great Britain Lions and also playing for New Zealand in the Test match against Great Britain, where he kicked four goals.

Later in the 1910 season he was suspended by the Auckland Rugby League for striking an official who had insulted his Māori companion.

== Later years ==
Jackson married a young Maori woman from Te Araroa, Horowai Henderson. Initially they lived at Hastings with Paraire Tomoana and his wife Kuini, who was a relative of Henderson's. They later moved to Te Araroa on the East Cape where he became a selector for the East Coast Rugby Union. He died in Auckland in 1957.

Jackson had five children, Everard, Mary, Reginald Tūtūtaonga (Tūtū), Sydney (Bully) and Irwin. Tūtū was adopted by their neighbours Tūtere Wī Repa and his wife Merewhati. Everard became a noted All Blacks prop. Sydney (Bully) Jackson and Tūtū Wi Repa represented the New Zealand Māori rugby union team. Everard's son, Syd, was a prominent Māori activist, trade unionist and leader.

Jackson's family in New Zealand reportedly had no knowledge of his true identity, and knew little about his life before 1908, but had heard some stories from the Boer War.

== Bibliography ==
- Salmon, Tom (1983). The First Hundred Years. The Story of Rugby Football in Cornwall. Illogan: Cornwall RFU. ISBN 0-946664-01-3.
