= 2022 New Zealand budget =

Government budget for fiscal year 2022/23

- Submitted by: Grant Robertson
- Presented: 19 May 2022
- Parliament: 53rd
- Party: Labour
- Website: Budget 2022

Budget 2022, dubbed the Wellbeing Budget 2022, is the New Zealand budget for fiscal year 2022/23, presented to the House of Representatives by Finance Minister, Grant Robertson, on 19 May 2022 as the fifth budget presented by the Sixth Labour Government. This budget was released in the midst of socio-economic impacts of the widespread community transmission of the SARS-CoV-2 Omicron variant, rising living costs, and the 2022 Russian invasion of Ukraine.

== Major announcements ==
=== Broadcasting, arts, and culture ===
- Allocating NZ$370m over four years in operating expenditure and NZ$306m in capital funding to merging public broadcasters Radio New Zealand and TVNZ into a proposed Aotearoa New Zealand Public Media (ANZPM) entity.

=== Business and industry ===
- Investing NZ$100 million in a Business Growth Fund for small and medium-sized enterprises (SMEs).
- Investing NZ$200 million in the Regional Strategic Partnership Fund.
- Investing in various construction, manufacturing, agritech, digital technologies, and primary industrial transformation plans.

=== Climate change ===
- Investing NZ$2.9 billion in the Emissions Reduction Plan.
- Investing NZ$16 million in community renewal energy projects over the next four years.

=== Cost of living ===
- Investing NZ$814 million for NZ$27 weekly cash payments to individuals earning less than NZ$70,000 over a three month period beginning on 1 August 2022.
- Investing NZ$235m to subsidise fuel excise and road user charge reductions for the next two months.
- Allocating funding to continue half-price public transportation fares for the next two months.
- Investing NZ$73 million in insulation and heating retrofits for low income homeowners.

=== COVID-19 ===
- Closing down the COVID-19 Recovery and Relief Fund (CRRF) and reallocating the remaining NZ$3.2 billion to other areas.
  - Retaining NZ$1.2 billion for any immediate COVID-19 public health needs.
  - Allocating NZ$1 billion to fund other Budget 2022 expenses.
  - Allocating NZ$1 billion to support cost of living expenses for lower to middle income New Zealanders.

=== Disability support ===
- Investing NZ$934 million in disability system "transformation" including NZ$735 million in disability service sustainability, NZ$100 million to launch the "Enabling Good Lives" budgeting programme, and NZ$108 million on establishing the new Ministry for Disabled People.

=== Education ===
- Investing NZ$2 billion in operating costs and NZ$855 in capital funding.
  - Investing NZ$293 million and NZ$8 million in capital funding to replace school decile system with a new "Equity Index".
  - Boosting school operating grants by NZ$184 million.
  - Investing NZ$777 million in capital investment to renovating school buildings, and replacing furniture and equipment.
  - Investing NZ$270 million in operating costs and NZ$5 million in capital funding in pay equity for education, care, and early childhood staff and teachers.
  - Investing NZ$230 million in apprenticeships including the Māori Trades and Training Fund.

=== Healthcare ===
- Investing NZ$13.2 billion over the next four years including NZ$11.1 billion to cover cost pressures and NZ$2.1 billion to establish the new Health New Zealand and Māori Health Authority, which would replace the current District Health Board system.
  - Investing NZ$1.8 billion to cover the District Health Boards' existing deficits.
  - Investing NZ$188 million for the Māori Health Authority to commission services and develop iwi (tribal) partnerships.
  - Investing NZ$102 million in community healthcare over the next three years.
  - Allocating NZ$299 million to Māori health services.
  - Raising dental health needs grants from NZ$300 to NZ$1,000.

=== Infrastructure ===
- Allocating NZ$661.5 million to KiwiRail; $312.3 million for improving the national rail network and $349.2 million for completing the replacement locomotives and freight wagons, including up to 29 new light-duty locomotives.
- Investing NZ$1.3 billion in upgrading health infrastructure including Whangarei Hospital and Nelson Hospital.
- Investing NZ$220 million in operating funding and NZ$100 million in capital funding in boosting health services' digital infrastructure and capabilities.
- Investing NZ$25 million in operating funding and $5 million capital funding for the Computer Emergency Response Team New Zealand (CERT NZ) to support private sector organisations and individuals.
- Investing in the Auckland Light Rail, a fire station at Whangarei Airport, and new Parliamentary accommodation.

=== Justice cluster ===
- Investing NZ$2.7 billion in total operating costs and $65 million capital funding to support the work of the Ministry of Justice, New Zealand Police, the Department of Corrections, the Serious Fraud Office, and Crown Law Office.
  - Investing NZ$190m into legal aid services.
  - Investing resources to maintain the current police-to-population ratio.
  - Investing NZ$92 million in operating costs and NZ$2 million in capital funding into combating serious and organised crime.
  - Investing NZ$34 million in operating costs and NZ$13 million in capital funding to meet the Government's commitment to regulate firearms following the Christchurch mosque shootings.
  - Investing NZ$141 million in so-called "democratic processes" including Electoral Commission funding for elections.
  - Allocating NZ$4 million to the Independent Police Conduct Authority.
  - Investing NZ$115 million in family and sexual violence prevention.

=== Māori and Pacific communities ===
- Investing NZ$25 million in the Māori cadetships programme.
- Investing NZ$66 million in the Māori Trades and Training Fund.
- Investing NZ$18 million in Pacific STEAM futures.
- Investing NZ$8 million in Tupu Aotearoa's employment and training services.
- Investing NZ$10 million in the Te Ringa Hāpai Whenua Infrastructure Fund to support Māori economic development.
- Investing NZ$26 million in the Progressive Procurement project to boost the procurement capabilities of Māori businesses.
- Investing NZ$40 million in Māori media.
- Investing NZ$28 million in preserving Māori knowledge (matauranga Māori) and other cultural treasures.
- Investing NZ$167 million in the work of Whānau Ora Commissioning Agencies.

=== Natural resources cluster ===
- Allocating NZ$1 billion in operating funding and NZ$12m capital funding to support the work of the Ministry for the Environment, Department of Conservation, and Ministry for Primary Industries.
  - Investing NZ$179m million in the Department of Conservation's operational funding.

== Reactions ==
=== Political reactions ===
National Party and Leader of the Opposition Christopher Luxon described the Labour Government's budget as the "backward budget," claiming that it failed to address New Zealand's high cost of living.

Green Party co-leader James Shaw praised the 2022 Budget for addressing issues of concern to the Greens such as climate change mitigation, family and sexual violence. By contrast, fellow co-leader Marama Davidson criticised the Budget for not helping low-income families sufficiently.

ACT Party leader David Seymour described the 2022 Budget as a "brain drain" budget and argued that it failed to address New Zealand's rising inflation. Seymour advocated reducing government spending and taxation.

Māori Party co-leader Rawiri Waititi criticised the 2022 Budget for not allocating enough money to the Māori community. He advocated removing food items from the Goods and Services Tax (GST) and taxing the owners of empty houses.

=== Treasury's advice ===
On 20 May 2022, the New Zealand media reported that the New Zealand Treasury had advised against the Government's NZ$350 cost of living payment for middle-income New Zealanders on the grounds that it would cost short-term inflation. The Treasury had advised the Government to consider targeted support to low-income households. Finance Minister Grant Robertson defended the Government's cost of living payment, arguing that it helped New Zealanders facing rising living costs.
