= Patrick Millen =

New Zealand public servant

Patrick Millen KSG QSO JP
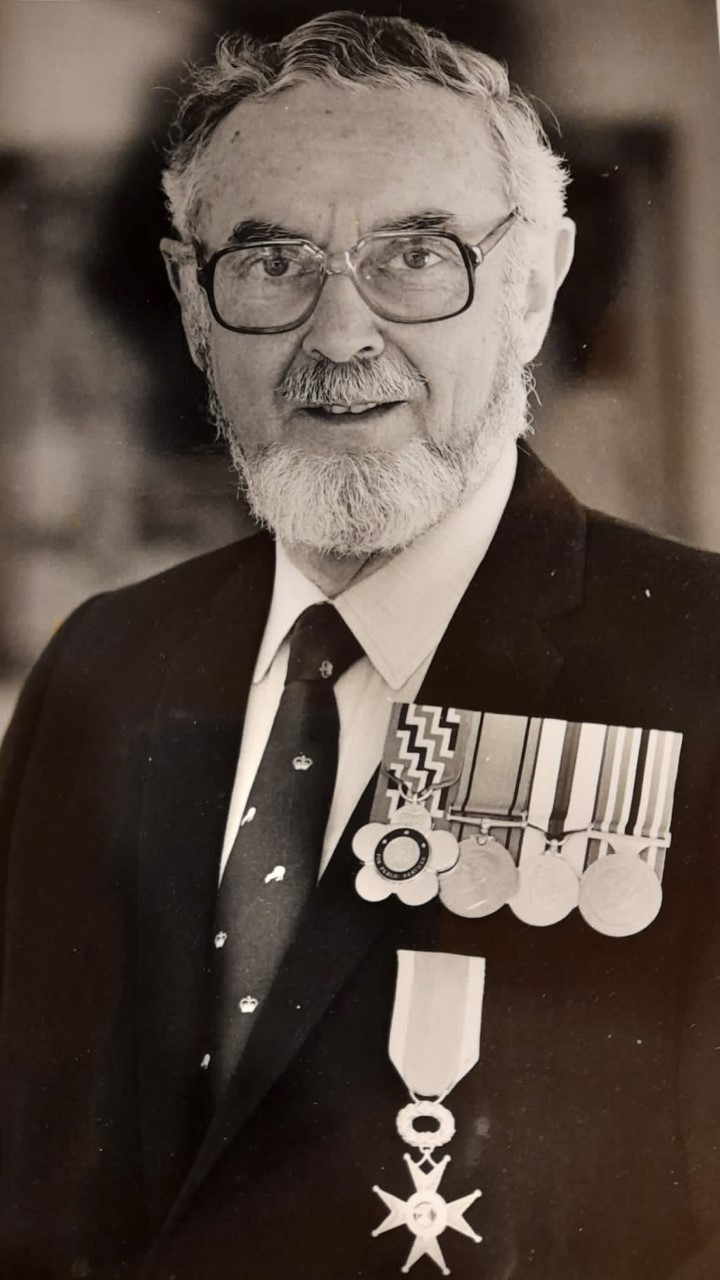

14th Secretary of the Cabinet
- In office 12 February 1973 – 21 September 1987
- Preceded by: Peter John Brooks
- Succeeded by: Marie Shroff

Personal details
- Born: Patrick Graham Millen; 5 August 1927 Beirut, Lebanon
- Died: 14 July 1994 (aged 66) Wellington, New Zealand

Patrick Graham Millen KSG QSO JP (5 August 1927 – 14 July 1994) was a diplomat and the New Zealand Secretary of the Cabinet and Clerk of the Executive Council from 1973 until 1987. In 1991 he was ennobled as a Knight by Pope John Paul II in recognition of his long and distinguished service to the Catholic Church and for his public service.

== Early life and career ==
Born in Beirut, Lebanon, the son of a Scottish banker, he had a cosmopolitan upbringing where he lived in Baghdad and Singapore and was educated in England, India, Ceylon. His interest in international affairs started through his childhood friendship with David Montgomery, the son of Field Marshal Montgomery, through whom he met a number of European politicians including future British Prime Minister Anthony Eden.

During World War II he worked for the Ceylonese Civil Defence and was awarded the Defence Medal for his service. After the war he spent two years in the Royal Marines and served on HMS London, which was deployed to the Far East. He left the Royal Marines to attend Oxford University's Pembroke College, eventually gaining a Masters in philosophy, politics, and economics. While studying he courted fellow student and future wife Mary Doyle.

He and Mary had the first of 12 children before emigrating to New Zealand in 1952 where they settled first in Invercargill. He taught at secondary school and worked as a free-lance journalist before joining Foreign Affairs in 1955. During his 18 years with Foreign Affairs he had two appointments to Canberra, one as deputy high commissioner from 1968 to 1972.

== Secretary of the Cabinet ==
In 1973 he was appointed to the Cabinet Office was the Secretary of the Cabinet and Clerk of the Executive Council until 1987. He served the governments of Norman Kirk, Bill Rowling, Robert Muldoon, and David Lange. Under Kirk's government Millen quickly had to get used to Norman Kirk's temperament, which saw the two occasionally clash, but they maintained a mutual respect and would quickly put aside their differences. After Kirk's death in office, the caucus voted in Bill Rowling as Prime Minister and he inherited a very challenging environment where the Labour policies no longer accorded with the impact of the oil shock. This presented challenges for the operation of Cabinet and Rowling's heart was not in it and Millen many years later reported that privately Rowling twice tried to resign. 1975 saw the election of the National Party with Muldoon as Prime Minister. After serving two Labour governments his reputation saw him stay on when Muldoon came to power. While Millen disagreed with many of his policy positions, he kept his reservations to himself and did not seek to influence Cabinet decisions, which included the abandoning of the Labour Party's New Zealand Superannuation Scheme. He later reflected that it was a minor tragedy as the scheme would have provided huge investment resources for the country. He developed an excellent working relationship with Muldoon, who he described as being terribly shy and private, yet entirely dominating in Cabinet. It was during the Muldoon government that Millen became known as the 'fly on the wall'. 1984 saw a change in government when Lange became Prime Minister and Millen's working environment changed significantly. Lange's styled himself as chairman of the board and bought a lot of humour to the role. However, Lange's approach could be relaxed and Millen complained of 'loose ends' to Cabinet decisions. Cabinet can be informal and tempers can fray, during his 14 years in Cabinet Millen was only asked to leave the room a dozen times in order for tense situations to be dealt with by the members of Cabinet. On two occasions he excused himself in order to prevent embarrassment. Occasionally he would pause in his notetaking and put his hands flat on the table to indicate that he was not recording what could be vigorous discussions in order not to inhibit the debate.

As a staunch believer in Westminster parliamentary democracy, in 1979 he published the Cabinet Office Manual, which outlines the main laws, rules and constitutional conventions affecting the operation of the New Zealand Government. This was a document first mooted by Sir Sidney Holland some 30 years prior when Millen's predecessor Foss Shanahan reorganised the processes for Cabinet operation. The Cabinet Manual has undergone revisions since, and is endorsed at the first Cabinet meeting of a new government, to provide for the orderly re-commencement of the business of government.

When Queen Elizabeth II visited New Zealand as part of her Queen's Silver Jubilee tour in 1977 she held a meeting of the Privy Council in Wellington. Millen held the appointment of Secretary of the Privy Council and was awarded the Silver Jubilee Medal. He was a key member of the Danks Committee on Official Information which led to the introduction of an Act in 1982 that reversed the presumption of secrecy in the operations of Government. The Official Information Act has since been recognised as a part of New Zealand's unwritten constitution. As Clerk of the Executive Council, he accompanied Sir David and Lady Beattie and Sir Paul and Lady Reeves to London to receive their appointments as governors-general of New Zealand.

In the 1985 Queen's Birthday Honours, Millen was appointed a Companion of the Queen's Service Order for public service and that same year he was sworn in as a Justice of the Peace. He retired on 21 September 1987 and was succeeded by Marie Shroff whose appointment was announced on 6 October 1987.

== Later life ==
Following retirement from the public service in 1987 he became advisor to the National Director of IHC, secretary on the Committee of Advertising Practise, and a member of the Wellington Criminal Justice Advisory Council. His involvement with the Prisoners Aid and Rehabilitation Society started in 1965 and he was later appointed a life member. In 1989 he was elected the Society's national president. He was awarded the New Zealand 1990 Commemoration Medal and in October 1991 he received the papal award Knight in the Order of St Gregory by Pope John Paul II for his long and distinguished service to the Catholic Church and for public service.

After his many years of exercising discretion in his role of Cabinet Secretary, in retirement he became politically vocal against the Bolger Government. In 1992 he released a press statement that the government had forfeited its mandate and said that it lacked moral legitimacy. This led him to present a petition on the steps of parliament for a fresh election.

His political aspirations were cut short when he died in 1994 at the age of 66 in Wellington. He was buried in Otaki next to his wife Mary and was survived by his 12 children and 38 grandchildren. His wife Mary had died only eight months previously. At his funeral former Prime Minister David Lange described him as "The diligent, literate, consummately discreet and professional civil servant."

== Honours ==
- Knight's Cross of the Order of St. Gregory the Great (Holy See 1991)
- Companion of the Queen's Service Order (New Zealand 1985)
- Defence Medal (United Kingdom 1945)
- New Zealand 1990 Commemoration Medal (New Zealand 1990)
- Queen Elizabeth II Silver Jubilee Medal (New Zealand 1977)
- Justice of the Peace (New Zealand 1985)
