= Marie Shroff =

New Zealand public servant (born 1944)

Dame Marie Shroff DNZM CVO
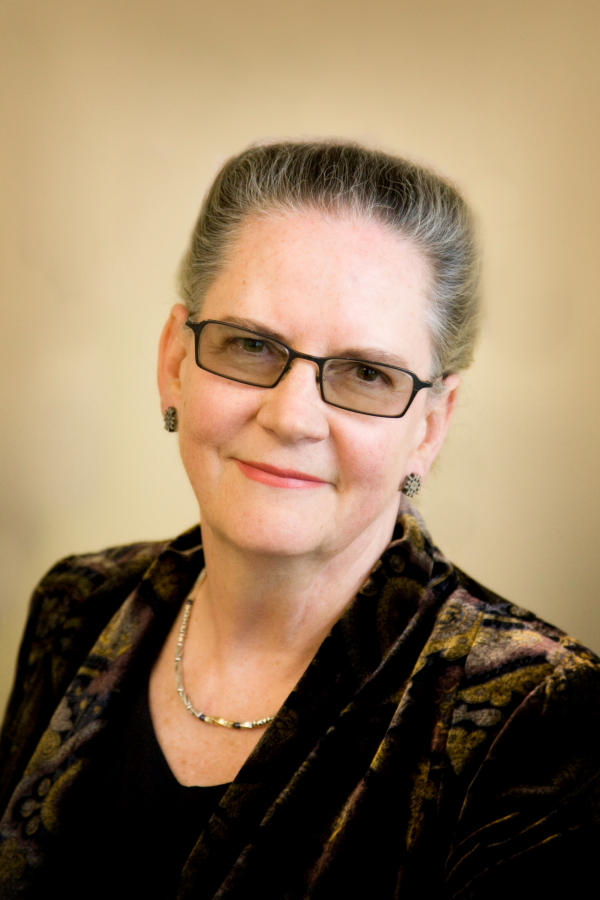

Chair of the Electoral Commission
- In office 2019–2024
- Preceded by: Hugh Williams
- Succeeded by: Simon Moore

2nd Privacy Commissioner
- In office 2003–2014
- Preceded by: Bruce Slane
- Succeeded by: John Edwards

15th Secretary of the Cabinet
- In office 6 October 1987 – 2003
- Preceded by: Patrick Millen
- Succeeded by: Diane Morcom

Personal details
- Born: 1944 (age 81–82) Auckland, New Zealand

Dame Janet Marie Shroff DNZM CVO (born 1944) is a New Zealand public servant. She has served as the Cabinet Secretary (1987–2003), Privacy Commissioner (2003–2014), and chair of the New Zealand Electoral Commission (2019–2024).

== Biography ==
Shroff was born in Auckland in 1944 and educated at Epsom Girls' Grammar School and the University of Auckland. She worked as a research assistant for the Ministry of Foreign Affairs (MFAT) and then as a journalist for the New Zealand Broadcasting Corporation. Her husband also worked for MFAT, and so she worked as a teacher at Samoa College, and then for the UK Cabinet Office during his foreign postings. On her return to New Zealand she worked for the State Services Commission in policy development and then on the creation of State-owned Enterprises.

From 1987 to 2003, Shroff served as Secretary of the Cabinet and Clerk of the Executive Council of New Zealand and during that time she co-led a senior officials group which prepared central government for the introduction of the proportional electoral system in New Zealand. From 2003 to 2014 she served as Privacy Commissioner. In August 2019 she was appointed to chair the New Zealand Electoral Commission, and served in that role until November 2024, when she was succeeded by Simon Moore.

Shroff is a member of the Media Council and on the boards of Consumer NZ and the Consumer Foundation. In 2017, she became the inaugural chair of the Privacy Foundation New Zealand, and she continues to sit on its board.

== Honours and awards ==
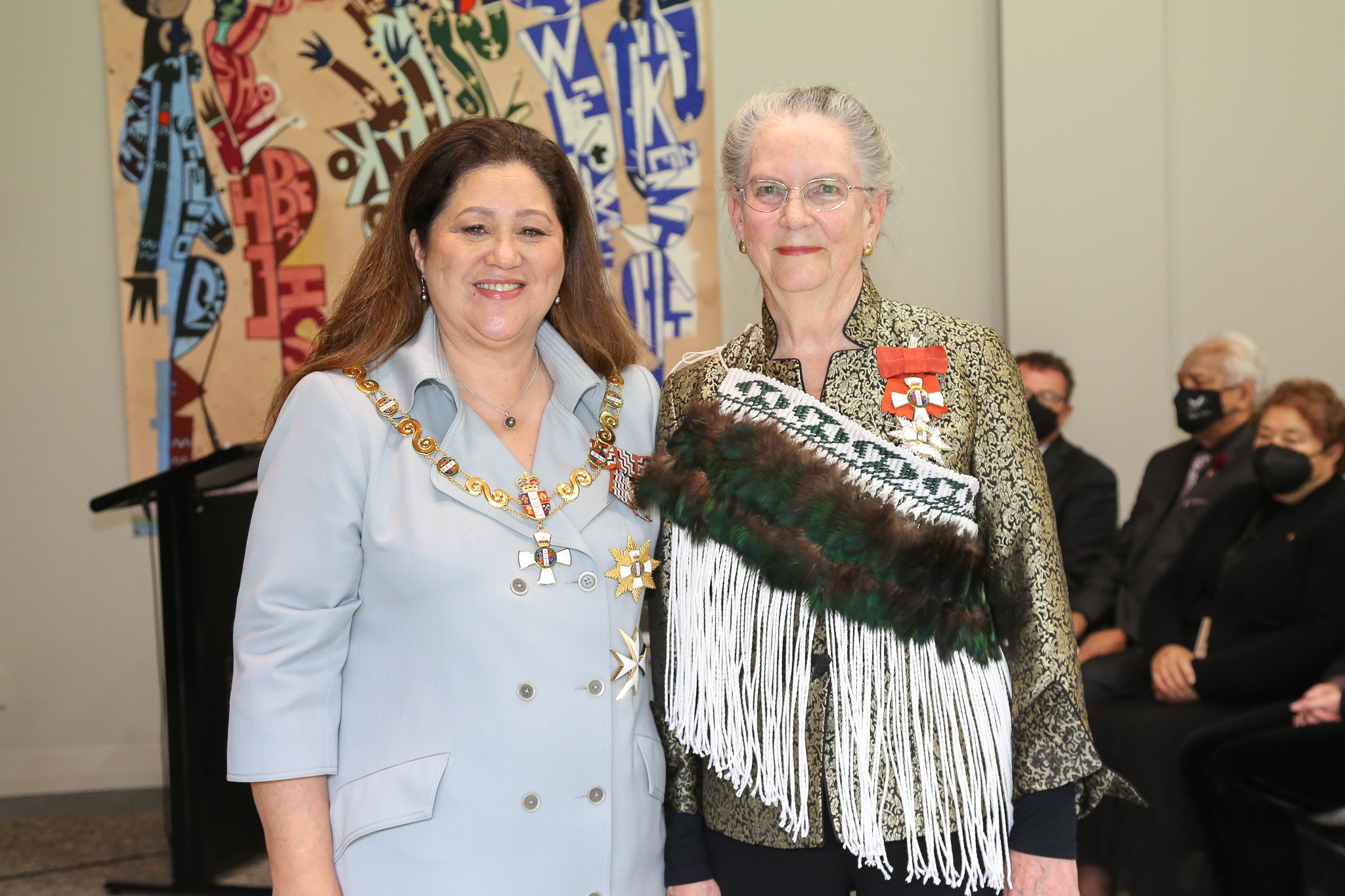
Shroff (right), after her investiture as a Dame Companion of the New Zealand Order of Merit by the governor-general, Dame Cindy Kiro, at Government House, Auckland, on 30 May 2022

Shroff was awarded the New Zealand Suffrage Centennial Medal in 1993. She was made a Commander of the Royal Victorian Order in 1995 and a Companion of the New Zealand Order of Merit in the 2004 New Years honours list. In the 2022 New Year Honours, Shroff was promoted to Dame Companion of the New Zealand Order of Merit, for services to the State and the community.
