= Time Gentlemen, Please! (video game) =

2009 video game

- Developer: Zombie Cow Studios
- Publisher: Zombie Cow Studios
- Designers: Dan Marshall; Ben Ward
- Engine: Adventure Game Studio
- Platform: Microsoft Windows
- Release: July 2, 2009
- Genre: Point-and-click adventure
- Mode: Single-player

Time Gentlemen, Please! is a point-and-click adventure game developed by Zombie Cow Studios. It is the sequel to the freeware game Ben There, Dan That! and was commercially released on July 2, 2009. As with the first game, Time Gentlemen, Please! was created using the Adventure Game Studio engine.

The game features a darkly humorous, at points surrealistic setting. Of note is the consistent referencing of other classic adventure games: posters from Sam & Max and Full Throttle were seen in the first episode, the characters often quote dialog from e.g. Monkey Island or Day of the Tentacle, Ben refers to Dan as "the Glottis to my Manny!", and the first episode features a zombie child called Gilbert. The game also satirizes the "adventure game logic" (i.e. carrying around a variety of useless items in hopes of combining them to be useful), with Ben and Dan often breaking the fourth wall and directly referring to not needing certain items in their inventory.

A sequel, Lair of the Clockwork God, was released in 2020.

== Plot ==
In-game screenshot

The events of Time Gentlemen, Please! continue from Ben There, Dan That!; in the first game, while attempting to rig a makeshift television antenna made out of a coathanger to watch a Magnum, P.I. marathon, Ben and Dan find themselves transported aboard an alien spacecraft. Eventually, they discover the spacecraft was simply a mockup built in a warehouse, designed to keep them busy. The plan was crafted by the future selves of Ben and Dan, who had traveled back in time to install their earlier selves as leaders of a mind-washed world.

Time Gentlemen, Please! continues from this point; Ben and Dan accidentally convince the world to simply watch the Magnum, P.I. marathon, eventually killing off the entire world population. Realizing this was a mistake, they decide they must go back in time and prevent the creation of the coathanger such that their future selves would have never been able to teleport them to the fake alien craft. After discovering the time device their future selves used, they spend two weeks (relative to themselves) travelling through time to attempt to correct their error, but instead find themselves having made things worse, as in 1945, Adolf Hitler has come to rule the world with his army of anthropomorphic dinosaurs due to the power of the Golden Coathanger. Hitler captures the two and takes the time device away, using it to further assure his power but further damaging the time stream. Ben and Dan work through the time paradoxes in order to defeat Hitler and recover the time device. Realizing now that preventing the creation of the coathanger is disastrous, the two go back in time and stop their earlier selves before the coathanger is invented. However, this creates yet another paradox and causes the universe to disappear. God appears to the two, noting how they have mucked about too much in the timelines and that he will have to reset the universe for them. The two find themselves back at their flat and their world returned to normal.

== Development ==
The game was designed by Dan Marshall and Ben Ward.

== Reception ==
Reception

Aggregate score
Aggregator	Score
Metacritic	84/100

Review scores
Publication	Score
Adventure Gamers	3.5/5
Eurogamer	9/10
GamesTM	7/10
Gamezebo	4/5
Joystiq	5/5
PC Format	87%
PC Gamer (UK)	87%
PC PowerPlay	9/10
PC Zone	90%

The game received "favorable" reviews according to the review aggregation website Metacritic.

Critics mostly praised the game for its humour and writing, while its scatalogical humour and swearing were "not for everybody". PC Zone said, "It's one of the most outrageous games I've ever played and for that alone I love it."

IGN UK named it one of the "best of 2009 so far" in August 2009.
