= Privacy (disambiguation) =

Privacy is the ability of an individual or group to seclude themselves or information about themselves and thereby reveal themselves selectively.

Specific types of privacy include:

- Financial privacy, privacy relating to the banking and financial industries
- Information privacy, protection of data and information
- Internet privacy, the ability to control what information one reveals about oneself over the Internet and to control who can access that information
- Medical privacy, protection of a patient's medical information
- Neuroprivacy, protection regarding the imaging, extraction and analysis of neural data
- Political privacy, the right to secrecy when voting or casting a ballot

Privacy may also refer to:

- Privacy (album), by Ophelie Winter
- Privacy (play), a 2014 play by James Graham
- "Privacy" (song), by Chris Brown
- Privacy (studio), the home studio of Warren Cuccurullo
- "Privacy", by Baekhyun from Bambi
- "Privacy", by Blue from One Love

== See also ==
- Private (disambiguation)
- Privacy Act (disambiguation)
- Privacy Commissioner (disambiguation)
