= Secretary of the Cabinet (New Zealand) =

Senior public servant

Secretary of the Cabinet of New Zealand
- Te Hekeretari a te Rūnanga (Māori)
- Coat of arms of New Zealand

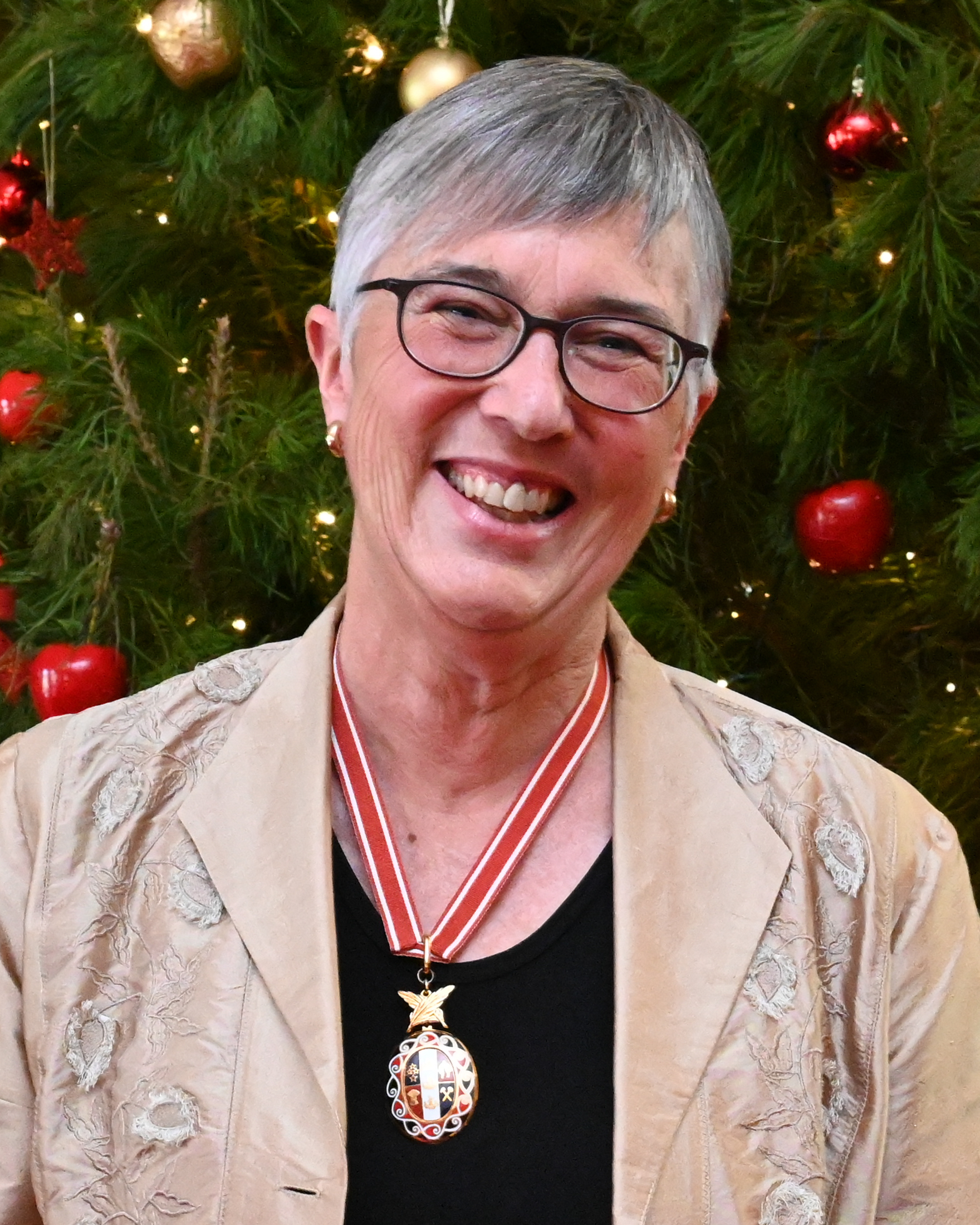
- Incumbent; Rachel Hayward since 2 November 2022
- Cabinet Office (part of Department of the Prime Minister and Cabinet)
- Reports to: Governor-General of New Zealand
- Seat: Wellington
- Nominator: Prime Minister
- Appointer: Governor-General of New Zealand; on the advice of the Prime Minister
- Term length: At the Governor-General's pleasure
- Formation: January 1864
- First holder: William Gisborne
- Salary: $212,450
- Website: Department of Prime Minister and Cabinet

The secretary of the Cabinet (or Cabinet secretary) is a senior public servant in New Zealand. The Cabinet secretary usually serves concurrently as the clerk of the Executive Council. The secretary is responsible for the impartial recording of Cabinet decisions, and as clerk of the Executive Council they are also a liaison between the Cabinet and the governor-general. The secretary is also responsible to Cabinet as a collective for ensuring the confidentiality of Cabinet proceedings, and the impartial and effective operation of the Cabinet system. The current Cabinet Secretary and Clerk of the Executive Council is Rachel Hayward.

== Responsibilities and powers ==
The Cabinet secretary is a public servant who heads the Cabinet Office, which while a part of the Department of Prime Minister and Cabinet, it is autonomous. The Cabinet secretary is formally appointed by the Governor-General by warrant under the Letters Patent Act, on the advice of the prime minister. The post has two principal roles that are designed to ensure continuity of constitutional government and provide support to administer the operations of the New Zealand Government.

As the clerk of the Executive Council, they act on behalf of the governor-general by providing a channel of communication and liaison between the government and the governor-general, providing advice to the governor-general, and administering the New Zealand royal honours system.

The Cabinet secretary is the steward of the Cabinet Manual. This document sets out clear descriptions of the key constitutional conventions observed in New Zealand, and describes the underlying structures, principles and values of government. The Cabinet Manual is endorsed at the first Cabinet meeting of a new government, to provide for the orderly re-commencement of the business of government.

While similar to its British equivalent, the role has some key differences. For example, authority over the civil service is held by the State Services Commissioner, a separate official. The Cabinet secretary is highly influential in determining the Government decisions on public law and through their constitutional advice to Cabinet.

== History ==
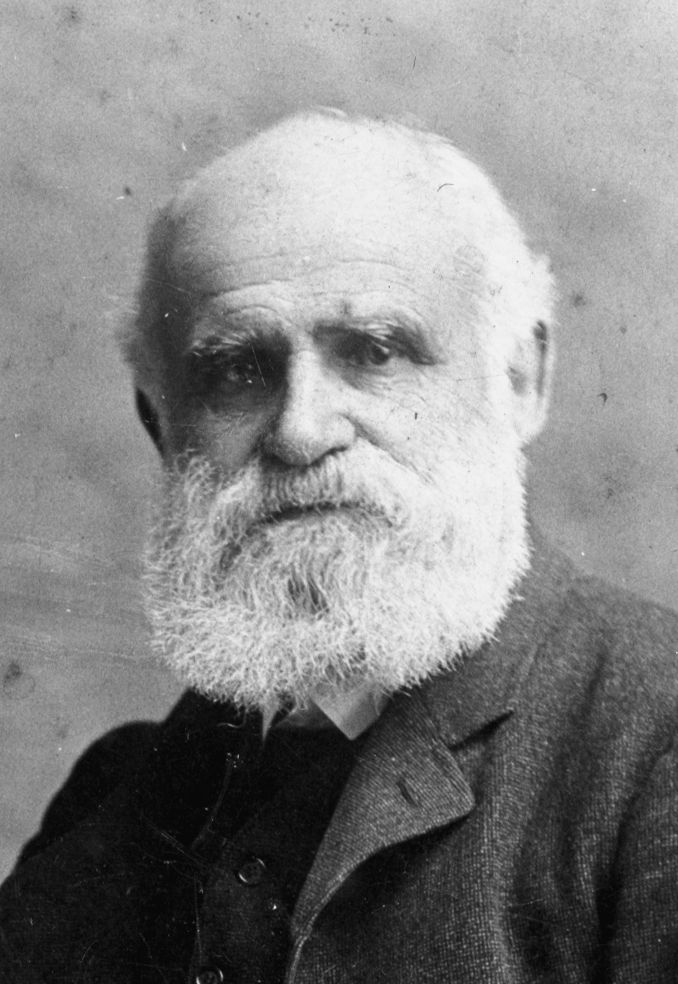
William Gisborne, the first secretary to the Cabinet

After the separation of New Zealand as a distinct Crown Colony from New South Wales New Zealand formed its first responsible government in 1856. By 1863 Cabinet had largely taken over the function of the Colonial Executive Council. This led to the establishment of the secretary to the Cabinet in 1864 with future colonial secretary William Gisborne being appointed.

The role required extensive knowledge of the colony and its constitutional underpinnings. In 1889 the role of clerk of the Executive Council was also assumed by then Cabinet Secretary Alexander Willis. This protocol has been largely abided by since, with an only exception occurring at the conclusion of Cecil Jeffery's tenure in 1945 for a period of 24 years when Foss Shanahan assumed the role of Cabinet secretary and held the position until 1955. During this time, the role of clerk of the Executive Council was held briefly by William Harvey and then Thomas Sherrard. The roles would not be combined again until the departure of Cabinet Secretary Albert Perry in 1969 when the then Clerk of the Executive Council, Peter Brooks, assumed the role of Cabinet Secretary. In 1979 Cabinet Secretary Patrick Millen collated and published the first Cabinet Manual, which centralised the practise and procedures of Cabinet into a single document.

When the Prime Minister's Department was established in 1926 then Cabinet Secretary Frank Thomson initially was appointed as its head. Eventually the Head of the Prime Minister's Department would become a separate role, although until the 1960s the roles were interchangeable.

Despite the name, it was not initially a codified practice to have the secretary present at Cabinet meetings, and this was usually at the discretion of the prime minister. During the first 84 years, if the secretary was not present, minutes were rarely taken and the prime minister or another senior minister noted Cabinet's decisions on a Schedule for subsequent recording and distribution by the secretary. Starting in 1946, Foss Shanahan sought to make a number of significant administrative changes to the way Cabinet operated which initially saw him joining Cabinet informally in 1948 and the presence of the secretary was formally adopted in December 1949. The Cabinet secretariat was set up by Shanahan for the purpose of co-ordination, continuity of action, and review, and to enable the smooth functioning of the work of Cabinet. As Cabinet deliberations are often investigatory or preliminary to action in other organs of Government, they are often informal. While ministers may remain anonymous in their advocacy or opposition to issues discussed, the Cabinet secretariat would record the agreed action.

Recent holders of the post have gone on to have successful public service careers. Marie Shroff served in the role from 1987 until 2003 and went on to be the Privacy Commissioner. and then chair the New Zealand Electoral Commission. Rebecca Kitteridge served in the role from 2008 until 2013 and went on to be the director of the New Zealand Security Intelligence Service.

== List of Cabinet secretaries ==
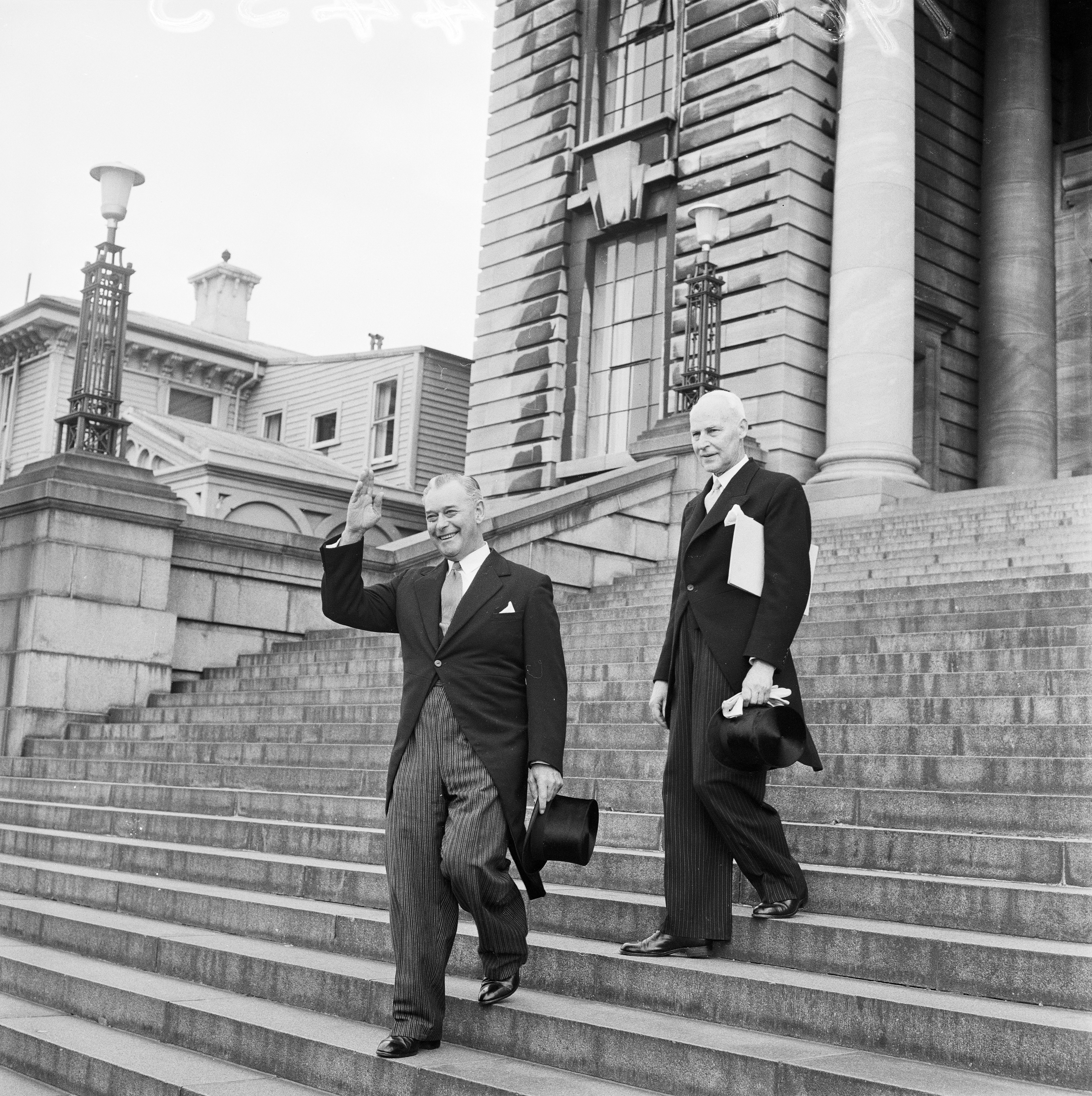
Prime Minister-elect Keith Holyoake leaves Parliament Buildings followed by the clerk of the executive council, Thomas James Sherrard, on 12 December 1960

	Name	Took office	Left office	Notes
1	William Gisborne	1 January 1864	2 July 1869	Forster Goring was Clerk of the Executive Council from 18 August 1862
2	Edward Wakefield	June 1869	1869	Forster Goring was Clerk of the Executive Council
3	William Robert Edward Brown	1870	1872	Forster Goring was Clerk of the Executive Council
(2)	Edward Wakefield	1 July 1872	1 November 1872	Forster Goring was Clerk of the Executive Council
(3)	William Robert Edward Brown	1873	1873	Forster Goring was Clerk of the Executive Council
4	George Sisson Cooper	1874	1876	Forster Goring was Clerk of the Executive Council
5	Ebenezer Fox	1877	April 1884	Forster Goring was Clerk of the Executive Council until 30 May 1889
6	Alexander James Willis	1885	30 June 1909	Also Clerk of the Executive Council from 1 June 1889
7	James Frank Andrews	1 July 1909	31 March 1919	Also Clerk of the Executive Council
8	Frank David Thomson	17 February 1920	14 December 1934	Also Clerk of the Executive Council
9	Cecil Jeffery	15 January 1935	31 March 1946	Also Clerk of the Executive Council
10	Foss Shanahan	December 1945	1955	William Osborne Harvey was Clerk of the Executive Council from 1 April 1946 until 31 December 1947 and then Thomas James Sherrard was Clerk of the Executive Council from 1 January 1948
11	Richard Hutchens	1955	1959	Thomas James Sherrard was Clerk of the Executive Council
12	Alfred Raymond Perry	1959	1969	Thomas James Sherrard was Clerk of the Executive Council until 30 June 1967
13	Peter John Brooks	1969	February 1973	Also Clerk of the Executive Council from 1 July 1967
14	Patrick Millen	12 February 1973	21 September 1987	Also Clerk of the Executive Council
15	Marie Shroff	6 October 1987	2003	Also Clerk of the Executive Council
16	Diane Morcom	2003	2008	Also Clerk of the Executive Council
17	Rebecca Kitteridge	26 March 2008	2013	Also Clerk of the Executive Council
18	Michael Webster	18 March 2014	2022	Also Clerk of the Executive Council
19	Rachel Hayward	2 November 2022	Incumbent	Also Clerk of the Executive Council

== List of Clerks of the Executive Council Prior to 1862 ==
	Name	Took office	Left office	Notes
1	James Coates	1841	1853	
2	Andrew James Richmond	1853	1855	
3	Frederick Gordon Steward	13 September 1855	1861	
4	James Holt	15 October 1861	8 February 1862	

== See also ==
- Executive Council (Commonwealth countries)
- Cabinet secretary
