= Ben There, Dan That! =

2008 video game

- Developer: Zombie Cow Studios
- Publisher: Zombie Cow Studios
- Designers: Dan Marshall; Ben Ward
- Engine: Adventure Game Studio
- Platform: Microsoft Windows
- Release: July 14, 2008
- Genre: Point and click adventure
- Mode: Single-player

Ben There, Dan That! is a point and click adventure game developed by Zombie Cow Studios (now known as Size Five Games). It is freeware and was released on July 14, 2008 for Windows.

The game was positively received by critics, who enjoyed the game's humor but criticized its short length and lack of music.

Two sequels have been released: Time Gentlemen, Please! in 2009 and Lair of the Clockwork God in 2020.

== Gameplay ==
The game puts players in control of two characters named Ben and Dan, styled after the game's creators. They must complete inventory-based puzzles in order to unlock doors to various dimensions aboard an alien spaceship and return home. Players can swap between the characters in order to have them work together.

== Plot ==
Gameplay screenshot.

The game begins in a London flat, where the roommates Ben and Dan are unable to get television reception to watch Magnum, P.I., having broke their antenna in a previous adventure. Their attempt to assemble a replacement results in an inadvertent alien abduction. Trapped on the alien spaceship, they realize that the only way to return home is by opening doors to various universes and finding the key to the next door from within that universe. These include Zombie London, Dinosaur London, and a London which has become the 51st State.

At the end of the game, they realize that the spaceship was actually just a fake and that it is located in a warehouse. It was a trick created by their time-traveling future selves, who had disguised themselves as aliens, to keep them from interrupting their plans for world domination.

== Development ==
The game was designed by Dan Marshall and Ben Ward. They were roommates at the time of the game's development, with the game being designed in a pub.

== Reception ==
Jim Squires of Gamezebo rated the game 4/5 stars, calling the dialogue "brilliantly written" and saying that it "keep[s] you laughing the whole time". He criticized the lack of puzzle difficulty, as well as its short length and lack of music. He called the writing "distinctly British" and said that despite being inspired by family-friendly games, the game was "best left to adults" due to its "racy" humor.

Luke Jensen of Adventure Gamers called the game "unique and hilarious". Stuart Houghton of Kotaku said the game was "heavily inspired by classic Lucasarts SCUMM games" and called the graphics "primitive", but recommended the game.
