= Private use area (disambiguation) =

Private use area may refer to:

- ISO/IEC 10646 / Unicode Private Use Areas
- ISO 639-3 Private Use Area: qaa to qtz
- ISO 15924 Private Use Area: Qaaa to Qabx
- ISO 3166-1 alpha-2#User-assigned code elements: AA, QM-QZ, XA-XZ, ZZ
- Address space in internet addressing for private networks

== See also ==
- Private (disambiguation)
