= Privacy Commissioner =

Privacy Commissioner may refer to:

- Privacy Commissioner of Canada
- Privacy Commissioner (New Zealand)
