= Gibbage =

2006 video game

- Developer(s): Zombie Cow Studios
- Designer(s): Dan Marshall
- Platform(s): Microsoft Windows
- Release: April 25, 2006
- Genre(s): Fighting game
- Mode(s): Single-player; multiplayer

Gibbage is a fighting game developed by Zombie Cow Studios. It was released on April 25, 2006, for Windows.

The game was a 2007 IGF Award nominee.

== Gameplay ==
Two players fighting in Gibbage.

Two characters spawn, one belonging to each player, called clones. Clones spawn from what is known as the power booth. Each power booth has a power level which drains perpetually. In order to keep the power booth's power level from dropping to zero, the players must collect power cubes, and then bring them back to their booth. Each player is equipped with a weapon called a Gibber with which to defend themselves and destroy their enemy. When a player is destroyed, he loses a portion of his power and must wait whilst a new clone is created.

When the new clone is created, the player takes control of it and direct conflict resumes. In addition to power cubes, from time to time a power-up item will appear. Collecting this will give the player one of a variety of upgrades or effects, such as an extra Gibber, a rocket launcher, or it may freeze opponents solid or reduce them to a single hit point. The game ends when all but one players have had their power level reduced to zero. The remaining player is the winner.

== Development ==
The game was developed for PC Zone magazine as part of a 10 part series on learning how to code an indie game. Developer Dan Marshall had formerly worked in the television industry. He had always thought that developing a game was easy, but had a "harsh awakening". The game was released as freeware in 2011.

== Reception ==
William Usher of Game Tunnel gave the game a "buy" recommendation, calling the action "fast-paced" and saying that "it will occupy many of your waking hours". Alec Meer of Rock, Paper, Shotgun said that the game "has a particularly neat two-player mode".
