= The Swindle (video game) =

2015 video game

- Developer: Size Five Games
- Publisher: Size Five Games
- Platforms: Windows, OS X, PlayStation 3, PlayStation 4, PlayStation Vita, Xbox One, Wii U Nintendo Switch
- Release: Windows, OS X, PS3, PS4, PSV; 28 July 2015; Xbox One; 31 July 2015; Wii U 10 September 2015
- Genres: Action, stealth

The Swindle is a stealth action game developed by Size Five Games. The game was released for Windows, OS X, PlayStation 3, PlayStation 4, PlayStation Vita, Xbox One, and Wii U in 2015.

The game received generally positive reception, with critics praising the game's setting and tense gameplay.

== Gameplay ==
The game takes place over 100 days. Each day a thief is sent on a heist to a part of London. The thief can search the region for money, avoiding or destroying a variety of guard robots patrolling the grounds. The thief can employ a variety of tools to destroy walls and other obstacles, hack computers for additional funds, or bug locations to turn them into income streams.

Other gameplay elements include perma-death, as a thief can die in a variety of ways, or become stuck and eliminated with a suicide pill to avoid capture, and the player assumes another thief on the following night.

== Plot ==
Set in a steampunk variation of London, The Swindle follows a group of thieves who are attempting to hijack an AI being developed by Scotland Yard. If the AI is completed, the thieves' exploits will be at an end.

== Reception ==
Reception

Aggregate scores
Aggregator	Score
Metacritic	PC: 70/100; PS4: 73/100; WiiU: 72/100; PSVITA: 74/100; NS: 63/100
OpenCritic	70/100; 33% Critics Recommend

Jordan Erica Webber of PC Gamer rated the game 80/100, calling the game's interface "streamlined and readable" and the game itself "immensely satisfying".

Zack Furniss of Destructoid rated the game 75/100, calling it "a festival of moments, of anecdotes filled with failures and smiles", but criticized the game for having potential bugs and exploits, as well as a "weird bloom effect" and "wonky" collision.

James Cunningham of Hardcore Gamer rated the game 70/100, calling the controls "troubling" and a "work in progress", but saying it was "awfully close to being excellent" due to the variety of enemies, art style and large amount of tools at the player's disposal.
