= Ebenezer Fox =

English journalist

Ebenezer Fox (died 1886), was an English journalist who later settled in Australia and New Zealand.

Fox was born in England and practised his profession in the north until he had nearly attained middle age. For several years he was a chief reporter on the ‘Manchester Guardian.’ His account of the great floods at Holmfirth in 1852 was widely quoted. Delicate health induced Fox to emigrate to Australia. In 1862 he went to Dunedin and joined the staff of the ‘Otago Daily Times,’ is associated with Sir Julius Vogel and B. L. Farjeon, the novelist. When Vogel established the ‘Sun,’ Fox assisted him. The two friends moved to Auckland, and soon after Vogel joined William Fox's ministry in 1869 as colonial treasurer, Fox became his private secretary. In 1870 he was appointed a confidential clerk and secretary to the treasury and then later as the Cabinet Secretary, roles which he held simultaneously. After relinquishing the role as cabinet secretary in 1884 he held the position of secretary to the treasury up to his death two years later. For sixteen years he was implicitly trusted by successive ministries. In the columns of The New Zealand Times Fox wrote a series of articles on the denudation of the forests, which attracted much attention.

Fox died of muscular atrophy at Wellington in January 1886. A columnist for The Bulletin noted that The Times had included an obituary of Fox, an infrequent occurrence at the time.
