= Gun Monkeys =

2013 video game

- Developer: Size Five Games
- Publisher: Size Five Games
- Programmer: Dan Marshall
- Engine: Unity
- Platforms: Windows, OS X
- Release: June 28, 2013
- Genre: Shooter
- Mode: Multiplayer

Gun Monkeys is a side-scrolling multiplayer shooter video game developed and published by Size Five Games. It was released on June 28, 2013 for Windows and OS X on the Steam platform. It was later removed for sale from Steam.

The game received mixed reception from critics, who praised the gameplay but criticized the difficulty of finding anyone to play against in the online multiplayer mode.

== Gameplay ==
The game takes place in an arena where monkeys with guns are pitted against each other. Players must grab "energy cubes" and return them to their base, with each player death reducing that player's energy by 1. If the energy of one of the players reaches zero, they lose.

The game's arenas are procedurally generated and contain environmental hazards. The game supports both local and online play. In-game cash gained in the online mode can be used to unlock various perks.

== Development ==
The game was originally released at a price of $9.99. While it broke even with development costs, the game still faced issues with the low number of people playing it online, which was a problem due to its multiplayer focus. Therefore, the price was dropped to $5.99 and was bundled in packs of two, with one giftable to a friend. The game's developer, Dan Marshall, stated that "the number of games you have to sell in order to have people playing constantly is HUGE", saying that for indie developers, such a thing "might not happen". The price drop was "reluctant" due to Marshall's dislike of the "devaluation" of indie games. For the same reason, the game was later updated to generate free Steam keys for players who waited too long for an online game.

== Reception ==
The game's reception from critics was mixed. Chris Carter of Destructoid rated the game 75/100, calling it "simple" but "a great way to spend a weekend", saying that the matches were "high-octane" and "skill-heavy". Edge Magazine rated the game 7/10, calling the matches "surprisingly tactical" and calling the voice-over featuring Kevin Eldon "ideal". GamesTM called the game "tremendous, if rather basic, fun".
