= Behold the Kickmen =

2017 video game

- Developer: Size Five Games
- Publisher: Size Five Games (Note: Published for Nintendo Switch by Ant Workshop.)
- Programmer: Dan Marshall
- Composer: Tobey Evans
- Engine: Unity
- Platforms: macOS; Windows; Switch
- Release: macOS, Windows; 20 July 2017; Switch; 18 June 2020
- Genre: Sports
- Mode: Single-player

Behold the Kickmen is a football video game developed and published by Size Five Games. It was released on 20 July 2017 for macOS and Windows via the Steam platform and for the Nintendo Switch on 18 June 2020.

It received mixed reception from critics, who are highly polarized in their opinions of the game's humor and gameplay.

== Gameplay ==
The game features a football-like approximation with the rules drastically changed to incorporate some from baseball and basketball. The pitch is round rather than rectangular, players score more if they kick the ball from further away, the goalkeepers are called "goldkeepers", and the game makes a "mockery" of the offside rule. However, the objective remains generally the same, to score by kicking a ball into the other player's goal. The player can control one team member at a time, "charging" and "hyper-curving" the ball.

== Plot ==
The game features a story mode about a "kickman" who must solve the mystery of his father's death, while rising up the ranks and dealing with a bully from another team.

== Development ==
The game began as a Twitter joke on the feed of the game's developer, Dan Marshall, saying that he wanted to create a soccer game without knowing anything about the sport. After making a prototype as a "personal Game Jam", due to being "bogged down" by his current project at the time, he received surprisingly enthusiastic feedback. He decided to make said game, which took over a year to develop.

The fact that the player can reveal what team members the AI would pass the ball to in order to prevent frustration was inspired by Mike Cook, an AI researcher who stated telling the player what the AI was thinking was more important than making one which was "very, very intelligent".

Marshall said that he himself dislikes football and created the game's story mode to "share" his "disdain". He said that while there was a large amount of positive reaction to the game, he also faced "genuine anger" from fans who "didn't realize it was a big joke".

The game's music was composed by Tobey Evans, who incorporated "faux dubstep" and chiptune elements.

== Reception ==
Reception

Aggregate score
Aggregator	Score
Metacritic	PC: 58/100

Behold the Kickmen receive "mixed or average" reviews from critics, according to the review aggregation website Metacritic.

Daniel Cooper of Engadget called the game "truly original". Though he said the gameplay was its "weakest element", he felt it was "enormously satisfying" when it worked and it is priced so low that "you can't not buy it". John Bridgman of Gamasutra said it fulfilled its goals of being both funny and engaging. Jon Denton of PC Gamer called the gameplay "sluggish chaos" and said that most goals come from the "extreme ineptitude of the goldkeepers" rather than "anything resembling efficient play". He called the game's humor "smug", "run through the filter of a mild superiority complex", and neither "insightful [n]or funny". Graham Smith of Rock, Paper, Shotgun criticized the AI as being poorly balanced and the gameplay "sloppy" and "erratic". He also found the game's humor "off-putting" and "mean-spirited" enough that it would only appeal to those who felt "assaulted" by football.
