= Rebecca Kitteridge =

New Zealand public servant

Rebecca Kitteridge CVO
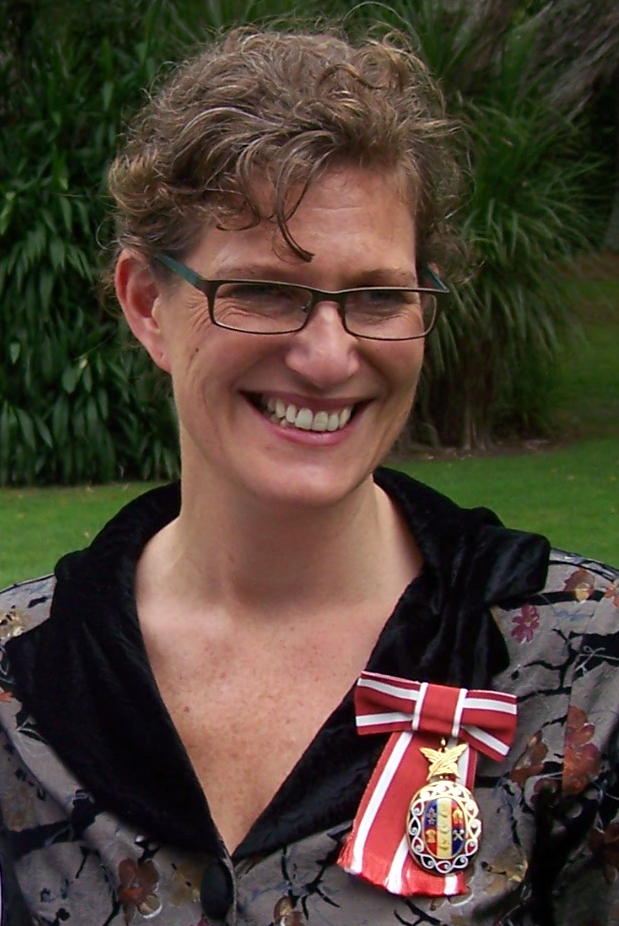
- Kitteridge in 2010 (wearing the badge of the secretary and registrar of the Order of New Zealand)

7th Director-General of Security
- In office May 2014 – March 2023
- Prime Minister: John Key (2014–16); Bill English (2016–17); Jacinda Ardern (2017–2023); Chris Hipkins (2023)
- Preceded by: Warren Tucker
- Succeeded by: Phil McKee (acting)

17th Secretary of the Cabinet
- In office 26 March 2008 – November 2013
- Prime Minister: Helen Clark (2008); John Key (2008–14)
- Preceded by: Diane Morcom
- Succeeded by: Michael Webster

Personal details
- Born: 1964 or 1965 (age 60–61)

Rebecca Lucy Kitteridge CVO (born c. 1965) is a New Zealand public servant currently serving as Deputy Public Service Commissioner.

She was Secretary of the Cabinet from 2008 to November 2013, Director-General of the New Zealand Security Intelligence Service from 2014 to 2023, and acting chief executive of the Department of the Prime Minister and Cabinet from 2023 to 2024.

== Career ==
Kitteridge attended Upper Hutt College, and is a graduate of Victoria University of Wellington. Her early career was in private legal practice before holding positions at the Crown Law Office, Cabinet Office and Ministry of Foreign Affairs and Trade.

She was Deputy Secretary of the Cabinet from 2003 to 2008 and Secretary of the Cabinet from March 2008 to November 2013. During the last six months of this time she was seconded to the GCSB as acting associate director-general to carry out a review of compliance systems and processes there, in response to concerns of illegal spying on Kim Dotcom.

She was appointed Director-General of the New Zealand Security Intelligence Service in 2014. She was the first woman to head the organisation. In late 2022, it was announced she would join the Public Service Commission as Deputy Public Service Commissioner from March 2023. Instead, however, she was seconded to act as chief executive of the Department of the Prime Minister and Cabinet (DPMC) in March 2023. That appointment was extended in January 2024. Kitteridge finally joined the Public Service Commission in April 2024 when a permanent secretary for DPMC was appointed.

Kitteridge will join the University of Oxford's Blavatnik School of Government as a professor of practice in public policy for a three-year term from November 2025.

== Family ==
Kitteridge has a husband and a daughter.

== Honours and awards ==
On 25 March 2014, Kitteridge was appointed a Commander of the Royal Victorian Order upon relinquishing her roles as Secretary of the Cabinet and Clerk of the Executive Council, and was invested by the Queen in a private ceremony at Buckingham Palace. In 2017, Kitteridge won the Public Policy Award at the New Zealand Women of Influence Awards.

Government offices
Preceded by Warren Tucker	Director-General of Security; 2014–present	Incumbent
