= Officials Committee for Domestic and External Security Co-ordination =

New Zealand government committee

The Officials Committee for Domestic and External Security Coordination (ODESC) is a New Zealand government committee which gives the Prime Minister strategic policy advice on security and intelligence matters. Operational security matters are handled by other groups, including the Defence Force, the Ministry of Defence, the Security Intelligence Service, the Government Communications Security Bureau and Police.

The committee was established by Cabinet on 23 August 1993. It is led by the chief executive of the Department of the Prime Minister and Cabinet, Ben King. Its membership reflects the skills and expertise needed to respond to a crisis but may include the chief executives of the Ministry of Foreign Affairs and Trade, the Defence Force, the Ministry of Defence, the Security Intelligence Service, the Government Communications Security Bureau, the New Zealand Police, the National Emergency Management Agency, the Treasury and others.

The group is headed by the chief executive of the Department of the Prime Minister and Cabinet, Ben King.

== Notable incidents ==
The group was involved in the anti-terror raids that occurred on 15 October 2007 and may be involved in some organised crime work.

It met on the day of the Christchurch mosque shootings on 15 March 2019 to coordinate the government's response.
