= Cabinet Manual (United Kingdom) =

British constitutional book of authority

The Cabinet Manual is a government document in the United Kingdom which sets out the main laws, rules and conventions affecting the conduct and operation of the Government of the United Kingdom. It was written by the Civil Service, led by Cabinet Secretary Sir Gus O'Donnell, and was first published by the Cabinet Office on 14 December 2010. The manual gives an overview of the UK's system of government, reflecting the importance of Parliament, Cabinet government and the democratic nature of the UK's constitutional arrangements by explaining the powers of the Executive, Sovereign, Parliament, international institutions (most notably the European Union), the Crown Dependencies, British Overseas Territories and the devolved administrations in Northern Ireland, Scotland and Wales. The Manual was written as a guide for members of Cabinet, other ministers and civil servants in the execution of government business, but also serves to consolidate many of the previously unwritten constitutional conventions through which the British government operates.

The writing of the manual was originally initiated by Gordon Brown as part of his broader plan to establish a written constitution for the UK. However, in 2011 the House of Lords Constitution Committee stated that the document was "not the first step to a written constitution" as it only describes the existing rules and does not "set existing practice in stone". The manual does not need to be formally approved by Parliament and can be modified at any time by the Cabinet Secretary.

== History ==
The United Kingdom has no single constitutional document; instead, much of the British constitution is embodied in documents, within statutes, court judgments, works of authority and treaties, which is sometimes described as an uncodified or "unwritten" constitution. The UK constitution also has several unwritten sources in the form of constitutional conventions.

In February 2010 during a speech to the Institute for Public Policy Research, Prime Minister Gordon Brown announced that he had asked Cabinet Secretary Sir Gus O'Donnell to "consolidate the existing unwritten, piecemeal conventions that govern much of the way central government operates under our existing constitution into a single written document". Sir Gus and his team in the Cabinet Office travelled to New Zealand, which uses the Westminster system of government and also lacks a codified constitution. Using the New Zealand Cabinet Manual as precedent, the Cabinet Office published a draft Cabinet Manual for the UK in December 2010 which was scrutinised by the House of Lords Constitution Committee, the House of Commons Political and Constitutional Reform Committee and the Public Administration Select Committee. Following recommendations by the Parliamentary Committees, a finalised version was published in October 2011 with forewords by David Cameron and Sir Gus O'Donnell.

== See also ==
- Erskine May: Parliamentary Practice
