= PC Zone =

British video game magazine

- Issue 193, May 2008
- Editor: Steve Hogarty
- Categories: Video game journalism
- Frequency: 13 per year
- Circulation: 11,357 (Jan 09 – Dec 09); 19,023 (Jan 08 – Dec 08); 22,297 (Jan 07 – Dec 07)
- First issue: April 1993
- Final issue: September 2010
- Company: Future plc
- Country: United Kingdom
- Based in: London
- Language: English
- ISSN: 0967-8220

PC Zone, founded in 1993, was the first magazine dedicated to games for IBM-compatible personal computers to be published in the United Kingdom. Earlier PC magazines such as PC Leisure, PC Format and PC Plus had covered games but only as part of a wider remit. The precursor to PC Zone was the award-winning multiformat title Zero.

The magazine was published by Dennis Publishing Ltd. until 2004, when it was acquired by Future plc along with Computer And Video Games for £2.5m.

In July 2010, it was announced by Future plc that PC Zone was to close. The last issue of PC Zone went on sale 2 September 2010.

== First issue ==
PC Zone was first published by Dennis Publishing in April 1993 and cost £3.95. Billed as the first UK magazine dedicated exclusively to PC games, it was sold with two accompanying floppy disks carrying game demonstrations. The first editor was Paul Lakin.

The magazine was split into four sections: Reviews, Blueprints, Features, and Regulars. Among the first titles to be reviewed were Dune II, Lemmings 2, and Stunt Island. The Blueprints section involved previews of new games and Features consisted of an article written about a specific area of gaming interest, such as gaming audio.

Regulars included a news bulletin, competitions and a Buyer's Guide which featured recommended games.

== Evolution ==
In its original incarnation, PC Zone recognised that its audience consisted largely of males in their late twenties and older, and adopted a tone suited to that audience. This was in contrast to contemporary multiformat and console magazines aimed at children and teenagers. During this period, the PC was not yet widely recognised as a games platform in the UK, an attitude PC Zone arguably helped to change by championing a succession of notable games such as Star Control II, Star Wars: X-Wing, Ultima Underworld and Doom.

By 1995, under the initial editorship of John Davison and then later Jeremy Wells (promoted from deputy editor with Davison moving on as publisher for the title), the magazine adopted a tone which heavily referenced lad culture, which had been made fashionable by magazines such as FHM, Loaded and Dennis Publishing stablemate Maxim. This period was marked by several moderately controversial episodes, including the accidental inclusion of a pornographic Doom modification on a cover-mounted CD-ROM, an article about the infamously bug-ridden Frontier 2: First Encounters illustrated with a large photograph of a piece of excrement wrapped with a bow, a joystick group test which featured a model dressed as a nun (testing each joystick for “phallusicity”), and a one-page comic by regular contributor Charlie Brooker, graphically depicting animal cruelty (originally intended as a comment on the violence against animals frequently portrayed in the Tomb Raider games) which resulted in the offending issue being withdrawn from W H Smith newsagents.

Towards the end of the decade, during the editorship of long time contributor Chris Anderson, the magazine underwent another redesign and a stricter scoring methodology was introduced. For a twelve-month period, it was rare for a game to score above 90%, although this was later relaxed, resulting in controversial 94% and higher scores for Black & White, Unreal II and others. It was around this time that the magazine retired the long-running Mr Cursor column, a series of humorous, quasi-autobiographical anecdotes written by a thinly-disguised Duncan MacDonald, originally intended to be a counterpoint to the jargon-heavy nature of much of the rest of the editorial.

Anderson was succeeded by Dave Woods. Most of the regular recurring features used in the current version of the magazine were introduced during this period, and Woods' final contribution was the redesign which marked the handover of the title to Future plc and the editorship to Jamie Sefton.

== DVD Zone ==
Each issue of PC Zone came with a DVD-ROM containing game demos, videos, mods, drivers, freeware software and patches among other things. The DVD Zone sleeve would occasionally have unique codes which gave readers access to game betas, trials, and in-game content, among other things.

== Later format ==
A new format of PC Zone was introduced in October 2005 for issue #159. By issue #220, the magazine cost £5.99 and included several regular features including Supertest, where reviewers discussed which game is best in its genre (later audio only); Steve Hill's NeverQuest, which followed the often unsuccessful attempts of Hill's venture into MMORPGs; Developer's Commentary, in which developers looked back on their recently released titles; Retro Zone, with a focus on a different retro platform emulated on PC each month; How To..., a guide with 8 tips for a recently released game and a Buyer's Guide, in which top games were listed, divided into 9 genres. The Buyer's Guide was developed from an indexed list of every game reviewed in the publication, along with closing comments. When the longevity of the magazine made this completely impractical it was pared down to just the best from each genre, becoming shorter with each redesign.

As of issue #220, the leaders in each genre are:

- Shooters: Half-Life 2 (inc. Episodes) : 97% / 91% / 82%
- Strategy: Empire: Total War : 94%
- Action/Adventure: Grand Theft Auto IV : 91%
- MMOs: World of Warcraft : 95%
- Sport: Football Manager 2010 : 88%
- Simulation: X3: Reunion : 92%
- RPGs: The Elder Scrolls IV: Oblivion : 95%
- Driving/Racing: GTR 2 : 92%
- Oddball: Spore : 95%

The oldest game in the Buyer's Guide was Deus Ex, reviewed issue #93 and given 94%.

== Review system ==
PC Zone prided itself on its reviews scoring system, which was based on the idea that 50% was an average grade. As a result, many publishers accused the magazine of being too harsh. Games that scored 75-89% were given a Recommended Award; games that scored 90% or more were given a Classic Award. Very few games, perhaps only ten a year, received the latter distinction. Games scoring under 20% were given the PC Zone Dump award (Previously the PC Zone Pants).

As a combined result of its honest scoring system and its age, PC Zone managed to acquire many UK and world print exclusives in terms of news, previews and reviews. PC Zone contained world exclusive previews for Half-Life 2, Doom 3, and Deus Ex, the first of which achieved a near-record score of 97%, a ranking it shared with three other games: Quake II, Alone in the Dark 2, and the relatively unknown flight simulator EF2000.

The lowest scoring game ever was Big Brother: The Game in 2000. It garnered a score of 1%, summarized with "Truly woeful, and the fact that Infogrames hasn't stuck the game in a box and is only collecting a tenner shows how embarrassed [they are] by this unmitigated piece of trash." The lowest scoring non-game release was Page 3 Calendar & Screensaver in 1996, which managed to score in the negatives at -10%.

== Staff ==
The last editor was Steve Hogarty, who left in July 2010, and was not replaced. He took over from Ali Wood, who left in December 2009. Previous editor Will Porter replaced Jamie Sefton in March 2008, who in turn was the replacement for Dave Woods after the magazine's redesign at the end of 2005. Steve Spence edited the hardware section until it was taken over by Philip Wand (who also wrote Dear Wandy, a monthly section featuring technical questions from readers which started out as Dear Wazza under Warren Christmas) at the end of 2004. There were discussion forums on the official PC Zone website, as well as on Philip Wand's own Dear Wandy site. There, members could request technical assistance and discuss gaming in general.

Pavel Barter contributed a regular investigative feature titled Special Report, which focused on various aspects of the games industry at large, as well as notable gaming figures and the specifics of the development process.

Dan Marshall contributed a regular column titled How to Make a Game which detailed the development of his first game, Gibbage. Gibbage then received the “Indiezone Game of the Month” award with 71% when it was reviewed. Marshall left, but wrote freelance reviews for the magazine.

Other regular freelance writers included Jon 'Log' Blyth, Ed Zitron, Steve Hill, Martin Korda, Rhianna Pratchett, Richie Shoemaker, Daniel Emery, Paul Presley and David McCandless.

TV presenter and newspaper contributor Charlie Brooker was also a regular during the 1990s, reviewing games, and contributing humorous pieces such as “Sick Notes” and the “Cybertwats”. Brooker would later include PC Zone as part of his show Black Mirror, in the season 7 episode "Plaything".
