= Department of the Prime Minister and Cabinet (New Zealand) =

Public service department of New Zealand

- Te Tari o te Pirimia me te Komiti Matua

Agency overview
- Formed: 1990
- Jurisdiction: New Zealand
- Headquarters: Level 8, Executive Wing, Parliament Buildings, Wellington 6011; 41.277899°S 174.776714°E
- Annual budget: Vote Prime Minister and Cabinet; Total budget for 2019/20 ▼$92,841,000
- Ministers responsible: Rt Hon Christopher Luxon, Prime Minister of New Zealand; Hon David Seymour, Deputy Prime Minister of New Zealand
- Agency executive: Ben King, Chief Executive
- Website: www.dpmc.govt.nz

The Department of the Prime Minister and Cabinet (DPMC; Māori: Te Tari o te Pirimia me te Komiti Matua) is the central public service department of New Zealand, charged with providing support and advice to the Governor-General, the prime minister and members of the Cabinet of New Zealand. DPMC is also charged with centrally leading New Zealand's "national security planning, which includes civil defence." The department's overall area of responsibility is in helping to provide, at an administrative level, the "constitutional and institutional glue" within New Zealand's parliamentary democracy. The department along with the Public Service Commission, and the Treasury constitute the central agencies or public service departments leading the state sector of New Zealand.

== Role ==
DPMC serves the Executive branch of government (the Governor-General, the Prime Minister and the Cabinet) through the provision of impartial advice and support services. Additionally, a major role is to help coordinate the work of the core public service departments and ministries.

=== Supporting the Prime Minister and Cabinet ===
DPMC supports the Prime Minister's twin roles as leader of the government and chair of Cabinet, and provides three kinds of direct support to the Prime Minister:

- Support for constitutional issues, including those associated with the formation of governments; and issues associated with the operation of the Cabinet system.
- Overview of government activity and access to information on any issues that arise.
- Administrative support to the prime minister (and also to the Governor-General). This includes services to the Prime Minister – such as preparing replies to Parliamentary questions, and dealing with Official Information Act 1982 requests and other correspondence.

=== Supporting the Governor-General ===
The Governor-General of New Zealand is the representative of the monarch of New Zealand, currently King Charles III. The Governor-General performs various ceremonial, constitutional, and diplomatic duties on behalf of the monarch, and is considered the highest-ranking public official in the country. The Governor-General is appointed by the monarch on the advice of the Prime Minister of New Zealand and serves a term of five years. The position is largely ceremonial, with the Governor-General performing various duties such as opening and closing parliamentary sessions, signing bills into law, and granting royal assent. The Governor-General also has a number of other ceremonial and diplomatic functions, such as hosting visiting dignitaries and representing New Zealand at international events.

The DPMC supports the Governor-General of New Zealand in carrying out his or her functions to represent the Sovereign. In this support framework, DPMC is expected to provide advice, administrative and support services so the Governor-General can perform their roles and duties effectively, ensuring consistent, lawful, and reliable professionalism.

The current Governor-General of New Zealand is Dame Cindy Kiro, who was appointed on 26 March 2021.

== Background ==
DPMC was established 1 January 1990, born out of a structural adjustment programme. Before this, New Zealand had a simple Westminster-style parliament with a two-party monopoly, which made the structural changes easier to implement.

The State Services Commission (renamed the Public Services Commission in 2020) in conjunction with the Treasury held a vast amount of power. Before the current-day department, the prime minister's department existed which was replaced in 1987 by the Prime Minister's office. The Prime Minister’s office included “the Prime Minister's advisory group, press office and personal staff, and a separate Cabinet office.”

At this time there were many moving parts to the Prime Minister's department and related agencies. With multiple government departments involved along with the division of government departments, declining interdepartmental collaboration, the Treasury taking a leading role in place of their coordinating one, and the necessity of challenging advice, this was reimagined to form the Department of the Prime Minister and Cabinet. This simplified government decision-making both strategically and operationally.

According to the DPMC website, the department was officially established on 1 January 1990 after the recommendation of providing two separate sources of advice to the Prime Minister. This is the basis of DPMC. Along with this DPMC utilises business units and agencies in their work. The 2013 Review of the Department of the Prime Minister and Cabinet (DPMC) reports that the direct accountability of agencies involved has been acknowledged as a respected part of New Zealand Public Services.

They list the following additions in the history of the DPMC:

- Government House (August 1990 - Present)
- National Assessments Bureau (previously the External Assessments Bureau) (1 July 1991)
- Ministry of Civil Defence & Emergency Management (April 2014 – 1 December 2019)
- National Emergency Management Agency (1 December 2019 - 25 September 2025)
- Canterbury Earthquake Recovery Authority (February 2015 - 18 April 2016)
- Greater Christchurch Group (1 March 2016 - 29 January 2021)
- The Child Wellbeing and Poverty Reduction Group February 2018 - ongoing
- The COVID-19 Group replaced the National Crisis Management Centre. 1 July 2020 - ongoing
- The Health and Disability Review Transition Unit. September 2020 - ongoing
- Implementation Unit. June 2021 - ongoing
- National Security Group. December 2023 - ongoing
- Risk & Systems Governance Group. December 2023 – ongoing

The DPMC website describes its primary objective as "helping to provide, at an administrative level, the 'constitutional and institutional glue' that underlies our system of parliamentary democracy." New Zealand has an ‘unwritten’ constitution which is characterised by its reliance on disparate pieces of legislation, norms, and structures that underpin the distribution of governmental power. DPMC plays a central role in the application of these foundational aspects of government in New Zealand, and therefore, as an institution serves as a part of these constitutional arrangements itself.

== Structure ==
DPMC’s Chief Executive heads the seven business units that comprise the DPMC. Each serves a different purpose and set of relevant Ministers or other office-holders.

1. The Cabinet Office is a ‘government secretariat’ which provides unbiased support to the decision-making processes of central government. The Cabinet Office advises the Governor-General, Prime Minister and other ministers on constitutional, policy and procedural matters, especially those contained in the Cabinet Manual (DPMC, 2023).
2. The National Security Group (NSG) leads New Zealand’s national security interests. They advise the Prime Minister, the Minister Responsible for the New Zealand Security Intelligence Service, the Minister Responsible for the Government Communications Security Bureau and other relevant Ministers on matters linked to national security (DPMC, 2024). This includes the National Assessments Bureau (formerly known as the External Assessments Bureau) which became part of the department on 1 July 1991
3. The Risk and Systems Governance Group focuses on the government building long-term prosperity and resilience in New Zealand. This oversees New Zealand’s national resilience system to ensure systems and structures are adequately equipped (DPMC, 2024).
4. The Policy Advisory Group (PAG) provides impartial advice to the Prime Minister, and occasionally other Ministers. This consists of the Deputy Chief Executive and 11 senior policy advisors with experience in areas of law, business, economic policy and social policy (DPMC, 2023).
5. The Delivery Unit reports to the Prime Minister and Cabinet on the development of Government Targets and the Government Action Plan. This Unit also guides public sector agencies responsible for the delivery of key Government priorities (DPMC, 2024).
6. The Strategy, Governance and Engagement Group (SGE) supports DPMC pertaining to strategic priorities and risk management. This group advises the Chief Executive, the Executive Leadership Team and the Senior Management Team relating to planning and oversight of the DPMC’s organisational development (DPMC, 2017).
7. Government House was added to the department in August 1990.

Responsibility for civil defence and emergency management was consolidated in the department in 2014 through a business unit called the Ministry for Civil Defence and Emergency Management, until the MCDEM was superseded by an autonomous departmental agency hosted by DPMC in 2019, the National Emergency Management Agency, which was subsequently transferred to the Department of Internal Affairs in September 2025.

DPMC, through its Honours Unit contained within the Cabinet Office, also administers the New Zealand Royal Honours System. Made up of the following awards, the final Honours list is approved by the King of New Zealand on the advice of the Prime Minister:

- The Order of New Zealand
- The New Zealand Order of Merit
- The Queen's Service Order and associated Queen's Service Medal
- The New Zealand Bravery and Gallantry Awards
- The New Zealand Distinguished Service Decoration
- The New Zealand Antarctic Medal.

From time to time there have been one-off or special awards such as the New Zealand 1990 Commemoration Medal, and the New Zealand Suffrage Medal 1993.

=== Ministers and portfolios ===
Business unit	Description of business unit	Role of business unit leader	Current business unit leader	Served portfolios and roles	Current office-holders
Cabinet Office	A government secretariat, headed by the Secretary of the Cabinet, that provides impartial support to central government decision-making processes and administers the New Zealand Royal Honours system.	Secretary of the Cabinet, Clerk of the Executive Council.	Rachel Hayward	All members of Cabinet, Cabinet Committees, and Executive Council.	
National Security Group (NSG)	Provides leadership, advice, support and coordination of the Government’s national security risks and priorities.	Deputy Chief Executive, National Security	Tony Lynch	1. Prime Minister (National Security and Intelligence); 2. Minister of Broadcasting, Communications and Digital Media; 3. Minister Responsible for the New Zealand Security Intelligence Service; 4. Minister Responsible for the Government Communications Security Bureau; 5. other relevant Ministers.	1. Christopher Luxon; 2. Paul Goldsmith; 3 & 4. Judith Collins.
Policy Advisory Group (PAG)	Provides advice and support to the Prime Minister in all Cabinet Committees and contributes to policy development across the full range of government issues.	Deputy Chief Executive, Policy	Anneliese Parkin	Prime Minister, with occasional exceptions.	Christopher Luxon
Implementation Unit	Monitors and supports implementation of prioritised government initiatives and ensures that relevant key political figures, civil servants, and agencies are kept informed on the progress of these prioritised programmes.	Executive Director, Implementation Unit	Katrina Casey	All ministers, as required.	
Strategy, Governance and Engagement Group (SGE)	Supports DPMC to achieve its strategic priorities and manages risk by working across the department.	Executive Director, Strategy, Governance and Engagement Group	Clare Ward	Advises and supports DPMC.	
Child Wellbeing and Poverty Reduction Group	Supports the Minister for Child Poverty Reduction and development of New Zealand’s Wellbeing Strategy for children and young people.	Executive Director, Child Wellbeing and Poverty Reduction Group	Clare Ward	Minister for Child Poverty Reduction	Louise Upston
COVID-19 Group	Coordinates, and where necessary leads, the All-of-Government response to the ongoing COVID-19 pandemic.	Deputy Chief Executive, COVID-19 Group	Katrina Casey	There is no longer a Minister for COVID-19 Response, with the last being Ayesha Verrall, whom this group will have served.	
Government House	Provides administrative and support services for the Governor-General and maintains Government House and its grounds in Wellington, as well as the smaller Government House in Auckland.	Official Secretary of Government House	Alice Ropata	Governor-General	Dame Cindy Kiro

A number of groups have been established and disestablished throughout the time that the DPMC has served the Government. After a significant earthquake in Canterbury in early 2015, while the city was still recovering from the 2011 Christchurch Earthquake, the Canterbury Earthquake Recovery Authority (CERA) was established, followed by the Greater Christchurch Group (GCG) in 2016. The disestablishment of CERA occurred in 2016 and GCG in 2021. The groups will have supported the Minister supporting Greater Christchurch Regeneration, initially Gerry Brownlee, then Nicky Wagner, and finally Megan Woods.

Many responsibilities have been shifted from the COVID-19 group to Health New Zealand and Ministry of Health. It's likely that the COVID-19 group will be disestablished, in the same way as CERA and GCG at some point in future, as the threat from COVID-19 fades and the pandemic ends.

== Programmes ==
The Department is responsible for a number of programmes and initiatives in response to significant events.

It previously led the All-of-Government (AoG) Response to the COVID-19 pandemic in New Zealand. As a part of this response, in March 2020, the department headed the first table-top COVID-19 planning exercise. In December 2020, the COVID-19 Response Unit (COVID-19 Group) was established as a business unit of the DPMC. The group acted as a central COVID-19 response function, responsible for oversight, integration and coordination across the response system as a whole. In February 2021, the Auditor-general announced a performance audit of the AoG response to COVID-19 (released on 13/12/22). By August 2022, the coordination of COVID-19 response functions began to transition from the DPMC to (mainly health sector) agencies .

It previously led the Royal Commission of Inquiry (RCOI) into the Terrorist Attack on the Christchurch Mosques. The report was released in December 2020 that details what the Public Sector knew about the terrorist. In November 2021, cabinet developed an approach to monitoring the Government’s response to the Royal Commission of Inquiry into the terrorist attacks.

It previously led and coordinated the central government's ongoing role in the recovery and regeneration of greater Christchurch following the earthquakes of 2010 and 2011. The Greater Christchurch Group (GCG) provided policy, planning, and monitoring support to Ministers on a broad range of regeneration issues across the greater Christchurch region. GCG also inherited specific responsibilities from the Canterbury Earthquake Recovery Authority (CERA). GCG operated from April 2016 until January 2021.

In February 2018 the Child Wellbeing and Poverty Reduction Group became a business unit of the DPMC to support the then-Prime Minister Jacinda Ardern in her role as Minister for Child Poverty Reduction and to support the development of New Zealand’s Wellbeing Strategy for children and young people. To achieve this, the group's purpose is to; embed the child wellbeing and poverty reduction legislative framework, support the system to focus on things most likely to make a positive difference, and influence change and drive action across the system. As the current Minister for Child Poverty Reduction, Jan Tinetti is now the lead minister for this work.

Following a review by Cabinet of the Health and Disability System Review/Hauora Manaaki Ki Aotearoa Whānui a business unit known as the Health and Disability Review Transition Unit was established in September 2020 to lead the response to the review. The Transition Unit has launched a new website dedicated to the reform of the health system in Aotearoa New Zealand. This business unit ceased to operate in September 2022 with its monitoring function handed to the Ministry of Health.

The most recent addition to the department’s portfolio of business units is the Implementation Unit which began operating in June 2021 with the goal of supporting the implementation of selected priority programmes and ensuring that key relevant figures and agencies are kept regularly and accurately informed on the progress of these programmes.

== Head of DPMC ==
The Head of DPMC has a "unified purpose to advance an ambitious, resilient and well-governed New Zealand". Their role is to be advisors, leaders, and stewards for the executive government. A key difference between the head of DPMC and those within the DPMC is that the head is part of the public service therefore their core job is to support the government of the day. They must remain non-partisan and will continue to serve the government no matter the basis of who is in the government of the day. The current head of the DPMC is made up of these crucial roles; Chief executive, Deputy Chief executive: of the National Security Group, Deputy Chief executive: Policy, Secretary of the Cabinet/ Clerk Of The Executive council, Executive Director, Strategy, Governance and Engagement Group and Child Wellbeing and Poverty Reduction Group, Executive Director: Implementation Unit and Deputy Chief Executive, COVID-19 Group. The clerk of the executive reports to the Governor-General and the chief executive reports to the prime minister. To see current members and their roles refer to the table above.

== Role of the Chief Executive ==
The Chief Executive of DPMC works for public service. The main point of contact between the Ministerial Department and the public service represented by DPMC is the chief executive. The Chief Executive of DPMC holds the core role of leading and managing the department. They hold many responsibilities including accountability for the department's performance and the conduct of staff within the department including areas like understanding conflicts of interest that staff may hold. Furthermore, they are also responsible for allocating and tracking the resources that the government provides DPMC. Additionally, they are the chair of the officials' committee for domestic and external security cooperation (ODESC). In conjunction with other team members of the leadership section in the department, they work to improve public service performance and work collaboratively amongst themselves and across multiple agencies. This department must lead and communicate crucial information to other agencies and departments within the government and the Chief Executive supports the prime minister of the day to enable this to happen well. The Chief Executive regularly holds meetings with the prime minister to discuss issues that are relevant to the DPMC. The Chief Executive also meets regularly with the Security of the Cabinet to establish the agenda for Cabinet meetings.

Heads of the DPMC (formerly Secretary, now the Chief Executive) are:

	Name	Term start	Term end
1	David McDowell	1990	1991
2	Simon Murdoch	1991	1998
3	Mark Prebble	1998	2004
4	Maarten Wevers	2004	2012
5	Andrew Kibblewhite	2012	2019
6	Brook Barrington	2019	2022
7	Rebecca Kitteridge	2022	2024
8	Ben King	2024	Incumbent

== National Security Approach ==
New Zealand’s national security programme has three intended outcomes:

- Protect New Zealand from threats
- Build a resilient, informed and engaged society
- Create an effective national security structure

National security is not managed by one agency alone. The agencies of the national security community manage the national security, with prevention as the main focus. As such, the agencies of the national security community prioritise early action.

Aotearoa’s New Zealand’s National Security Strategy outlines the national security approach. This aids the government to act early, deliberately, and in partnership to protect and promote its national security interests. It also aims to understand, intercept, prepare for and respond to threats affecting Aotearoa.

== The Policy Project ==
The Policy Project operates within the Policy Advisory Group business unit. It supports the Chief Executive of DPMC’s stewardship role as Head of the Policy Profession. The Policy Project was established in 2014 as a way to improve the policy system by the Head of the Policy Profession.

The project aims to build a high performing policy system to support good government decision making. They achieve this through:

- Establishing and promoting three policy frameworks throughout the public service. These are the Policy Skills Framework, Policy Capability Framework and Policy Quality Framework. The project provides a range of tools and resources for public servants to encourage active use of the three policy frameworks.
- Developing guidance for public servants for specific regulatory duties, including community engagement or the development of Long-term Insights Briefings.

=== The Policy Quality Framework ===
The Policy Quality Framework further provides the New Zealand public service with an empirical way of measuring the quality of their policy advice. This is to reflect on the quality of policy advice provided and ministerial satisfaction with the policy advice.

Using the framework, public service agencies are instructed to report of their policy quality in their Annual Report. This is represented by a numerical score, using the Policy Quality Framework. Agencies will include a target within their Estimates process, which is later compared with their actual performance in the Annual Report. This process has been mandatory since 1 July 2019.

In 2021, The Policy Project underwent an interim evaluation, commissioned in the previous year by the Head of the Policy Profession. The review was performed by Allen + Clarke Policy and Regulatory Specialists. The review found The Policy Project to be fit-for-purpose, well-regarded and efficient. The products and services of the project were regarded as high-quality. Evidence sourced throughout the review found high use of the Policy Quality Framework, however found most policy practitioners did not have a good awareness of the tools available by The Policy Project and were not implementing these tools to inform policy advice.

== See also ==
- Officials Committee for Domestic and External Security Co-ordination
- Department of the Prime Minister and Cabinet (Australia)
