= Cabinet of New Zealand =

Central decision-making forum of the New Zealand Government

The Cabinet of New Zealand (Māori: Te Rūnanga o te Kāwanatanga o Aotearoa) (Note: Translated as: "The Rūnanga (literally 'Council') of the Government of New Zealand") is the New Zealand Government's body of senior ministers, accountable to the New Zealand Parliament. Cabinet meetings, chaired by the prime minister, occur once a week; in them, vital issues are discussed and government policy is formulated. Cabinet is also composed of a number of committees focused on specific areas of governance and policy. Though not established by any statute, Cabinet wields significant power within the New Zealand political system, with nearly all government bills it introduces in Parliament being enacted.

The New Zealand Cabinet follows the traditions of the British cabinet system. Members of Cabinet are collectively responsible to Parliament for its actions and policies. Cabinet discussions are confidential and are not disclosed to the public apart from the announcement of decisions.

All ministers in Cabinet also serve as members of the Executive Council, the body tasked with advising the governor-general in the exercise of his or her formal constitutional functions. Outside Cabinet, there are a number of non-Cabinet ministers, responsible for a specific policy area and reporting directly to a senior Cabinet minister. Ministers outside Cabinet are also part of Cabinet committees and will regularly attend Cabinet meetings which concern their portfolios. Therefore, although operating outside of Cabinet directly, these ministers do not lack power and influence as they are still very much part of the decision-making process.

== Constitutional basis ==
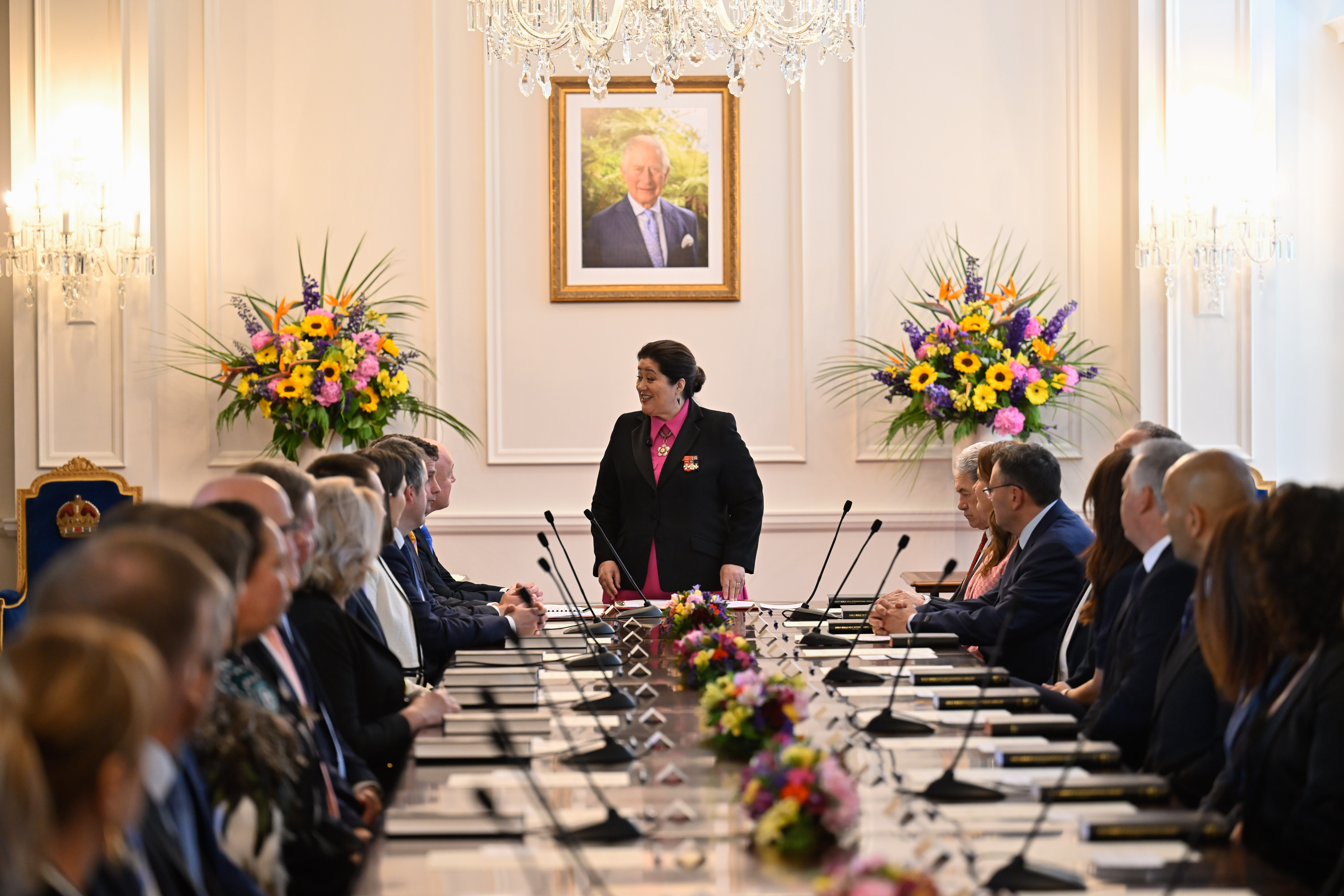
Swearing-in of ministers by Governor-General Dame Cindy Kiro, 27 November 2023

Cabinet is not established by any statute or constitutional document but exists purely by long-established constitutional convention. This convention carries sufficient weight for many official declarations and regulations to refer to Cabinet; a government department—the Department of the Prime Minister and Cabinet—is responsible for supporting it. Although Cabinet lacks any direct legislative framework for its existence, the Cabinet Manual has become the official document which governs its functions, as well as on which its convention rests.

The structure of Cabinet has as its basis the formal institution known as the Executive Council, the body tasked with advising the governor-general in the exercise of their formal constitutional functions (the "Governor-General in Council"). Cabinet members are first appointed as executive councillors before receiving warrants for their ministerial portfolios. Most ministers are members of both bodies, but some executive councillors, known as "ministers outside Cabinet", are not members of Cabinet and do not normally attend its meetings. The convention of a cabinet meeting separately from the Executive Council began during Edward Stafford's first tenure as premier (1856–1861). Stafford, a long-time advocate of responsible government in New Zealand, believed the colonial government should have full control over all its affairs, without the intervention of the governor. Because the governor chaired the Executive Council, Stafford intentionally met with his ministers without the governor present, thus reducing the Council to its formal role.

== Powers and functions ==
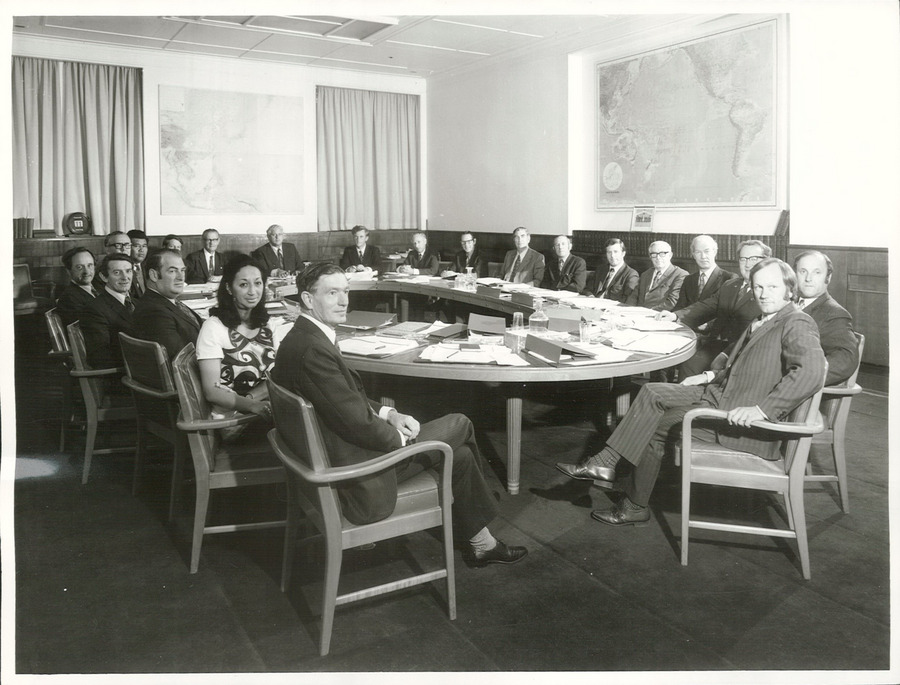
A meeting of Cabinet in 1972. At this time, Cabinet members were usually Pākehā and male; Whetu Tirikatene-Sullivan (seated second-left from the centre) was the only female Cabinet minister.

The lack of formal legislation establishing Cabinet leaves the powers of its members only loosely defined. Cabinet generally directs and controls policy (releasing government policy statements), and is responsible to the House of Representatives, the elected component of Parliament. It also has significant influence over law-making, and all draft government bills must be submitted to the Cabinet Legislation Committee before they can be introduced to the House. Convention regarding Cabinet's authority has considerable force, and generally proves strong enough to bind its participants. Theoretically, each minister operates independently, having received a ministerial warrant over a certain field from the Crown. But the governor-general can dismiss a minister at any time, conventionally on the advice of the prime minister, so ministers are largely obliged to work within a certain framework.

=== Collective responsibility ===
Cabinet itself acts as the accepted forum for establishing this framework. Ministers will jointly discuss the policy which the government as a whole will pursue, and ministers who do not exercise their respective powers in a manner compatible with Cabinet's decision risk losing those powers. This has become known as the doctrine of Cabinet collective responsibility. Collective responsibility is grounded in three key principles. The first principle is unanimity, where members of Cabinet must publicly support decisions and defend them in public, regardless of any personal views on the matter. Secondly, the confidentiality limb means that all Cabinet discussions are to be kept confidential. This allows for open and explicit conversation, discussion and debate on the issues Cabinet chooses to look at. The final principle is confidence, where Cabinet and executive government must have the confidence of the House of Representatives. If there is no government, the governor-general has the ability to intervene to find a government that does have confidence.

Formally all ministers are equals and may not command or be commanded by a fellow minister. Constitutional practice does, however, dictate that the prime minister is primus inter pares, meaning 'first among equals'.

Problems arise when the prime minister breaches collective responsibility. Since ministerial appointments and dismissals are in practice in the hands of the prime minister, Cabinet can not directly initiate any action against a prime minister who openly disagrees with their government's policy. On the other hand, a prime minister who tries to act against concerted opposition from their Cabinet risks losing the confidence of their party colleagues. An example is former Prime Minister David Lange, who publicly spoke against a tax reform package which was sponsored by then-Finance Minister Roger Douglas and supported by Cabinet. Douglas was forced to resign, but when the Cabinet supported Douglas against Lange, the Prime Minister interpreted this as a vote of no-confidence in his leadership and stepped down.

==== Collective responsibility after MMP ====
Some political commentators, such as professor of law Philip Joseph, have argued that it is a misnomer to deem the unanimity principle of collective responsibility a constitutional convention as such. Joseph views unanimity as merely a "rule of pragmatic politics", lacking a sufficient constitutional nature to be deemed a constitutional convention. He states that, unlike a convention, governments may waive, suspend or abandon political rules, as has happened since the introduction of the mixed-member proportional system (MMP) in 1993 (see § Electoral reform). One reform following the introduction of MMP allowed for junior parties in a coalition the ability to 'agree to disagree' with the majority in order to manage policy differences. Following the 2011 general election the National-led government released the following statement in regards to the role of minor parties in the context of collective responsibility:

Collective responsibility applies differently in the case of support party Ministers. Support party Ministers are only bound by collective responsibility in relation to their own respective portfolios (including any specific delegated responsibilities). When support party Ministers speak about the issues in their portfolios, they speak for the government and as part of the government. When the government takes decisions within their portfolios, they must support those decisions, regardless of their personal views and whether or not they were at the meeting concerned. When support party Ministers speak about matters outside their portfolios, they may speak as political party leaders or members of Parliament rather than as Ministers, and do not necessarily support the government position.

Ministers outside Cabinet retain individual ministerial responsibility for the actions of their department (in common with Cabinet ministers).

== Electoral reform and Cabinet structure ==
The 1993 electoral referendum in New Zealand resulted in a number of structural changes to Cabinet. The change to the MMP system ultimately led to a larger number of political parties in Parliament, as under the proportional representation system any political party can enter Parliament if they received five percent of the party vote or won one electorate seat. The increased representation resulted in the need to form coalitions between parties, as no single party received a majority of votes and seats under MMP until 2020. In order to govern in a coalition under MMP, it is likely that a major party will have to relinquish and offer Cabinet positions to members of a minority party.

The aftermath of the first MMP election in 1996 highlighted the changes resulting from the new proportional parliament. New Zealand First received 13.4% of the party vote, giving them 17 total seats in the House of Representatives (in contrast to 8.5% in the 1993 general election, conducted under the plurality voting system). This ultimately resulted in the National–New Zealand First coalition as the National Party, who received 33.8% of the party vote, translating to 44 seats in the House, could not govern alone.

Negotiations forming the new government took nearly two months however the ultimate result being that New Zealand First were to have five ministers inside Cabinet and four outside. This translated to having 36.4% of representation in the new government. The Prime Minister following the 1996 election, Jim Bolger, was forced to tell his caucus during negotiations with New Zealand First, that he would not be able to satisfy all ambitions of the caucus, due to the forced inclusion of the minority party into the governmental framework, thus highlighting one of the challenges that came with MMP.

The result of MMP on Cabinet structure in New Zealand is also highlighted below under the § Members heading. In the coalition deal following the election New Zealand First leader Winston Peters was given the position of deputy prime minister, and New Zealand First were given a number of ministerial portfolios including foreign affairs, infrastructure, regional economic development, and internal affairs.

== Meetings ==
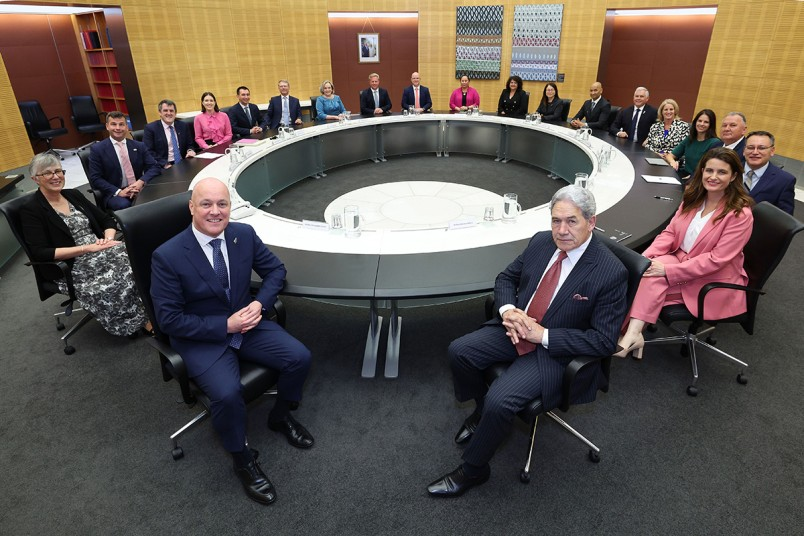
Photograph taken before the first meeting of the Cabinet of the Sixth National Government of New Zealand, Beehive, 28 November 2023

Members of Cabinet meet on a regular basis, usually weekly on a Monday, to discuss the most important issues of government policy. Matters that must be submitted to Cabinet include new legislation, involving draft government bills; financial proposals and budget decisions; constitutional arrangements; public service changes; government responses to select committee recommendations; portfolio interests of ministers; appointments to government bodies; and international treaties.

The meetings are chaired by the prime minister or, in the prime minister's absence, the next most senior minister in attendance, usually the deputy prime minister. Ministers outside Cabinet may occasionally be invited for the discussion of particular items with which they have been closely involved. (Note: Only members regularly attend Cabinet meetings, although ministers outside Cabinet and support party ministers can be invited to attend if an area of their portfolio is on the agenda. Thus all ministers listed below have a role in Cabinet's decision-making.) All Cabinet meetings are held behind closed doors, and the minutes are taken by the Cabinet secretary and kept confidential. However, usually shortly after the weekly meeting the prime minister holds a press conference to discuss important national issues.

The Cabinet secretary and their deputy are the only non-ministers who attend Cabinet meetings. They are not political appointments and their role at Cabinet meetings is to formulate and record the Cabinet's decisions and advise on procedure, not to offer policy advice. The secretary has a dual role as the clerk of the Executive Council, where they provide a channel of communication and liaison between the Cabinet and the governor-general.

The Cabinet room, where the weekly meetings are normally held, and related offices are on the top floor (the 10th floor) of the Beehive (the Executive Wing of Parliament Buildings).

== Members ==
The prime minister assigns roles to ministers and ranks them to determine seniority. A minister's rank depends on factors such as "their length of service, the importance of their portfolio and their personal standing with the prime minister". The deputy prime minister is the second-highest ranked, after the prime minister. Under MMP, there are typically three categories of minister: ministers in the 'core' Cabinet, ministers outside Cabinet, and ministers from support parties (i.e. minor parties that have agreed to support a government party in confidence and supply votes). The size of Cabinet has grown over time. In the 1890s, for example, there were seven Cabinet ministers. The number of ministers in Cabinet increased up to the 1970s, but has plateaued at 20 since 1972 despite increases in the number of members of parliament. The number of ministers outside Cabinet has grown, however, especially since the introduction of MMP.

Ministers are formally styled "The Honourable" (abbreviated to "The Hon."), except for the prime minister, who is accorded the style "The Right Honourable" ("The Rt. Hon."). Previously, several senior ministers used "The Right Honourable" by virtue of membership of the Privy Council before appointments were discontinued in 2000. Currently, Winston Peters retains this style due to his appointment as a member of the Privy Council in 1998.

=== Current ministers ===
The current ministry (Note: See List of New Zealand governments § List of ministries.) has a Cabinet of 19 ministers: 13 from the National Party, three from ACT, and three from New Zealand First. There are eight ministers outside Cabinet: five from National, two from ACT, and one from New Zealand First. Additionally, two parliamentary under-secretaries assist ministers from a parliamentary standpoint. (Note: Unlike ministers, under-secretaries are not members of the Executive Council.) The table below lists all ministers, as of 13 August 2026.

Parties
National
NZ First
ACT

Portfolios	Image	Incumbent	Additional responsibilities	Electorate
Cabinet Ministers
National Party ministers
Prime Minister; Minister for National Security and Intelligence		Christopher Luxon	Minister Responsible for Ministerial Services	Botany
Minister of Finance; Minister for Economic Growth; Minister for Social Investment		Nicola Willis		List
Attorney-General; Minister of Housing; Minister for Infrastructure; Minister Responsible for RMA Reform; Minister of Transport		Chris Bishop	Associate Minister of Finance	Hutt South
Minister of Health; Minister for Energy; Minister for State Owned Enterprises		Simeon Brown		Pakuranga
Minister of Education; Minister for Immigration		Erica Stanford	Lead Coordination Minister for the Government's Response to the Royal Commission's Report into Historical Abuse in State Care and in the Care of Faith-based Institutions	East Coast Bays
Minister for Arts, Culture and Heritage; Minister of Defence; Minister Responsible for the GCSB and NZSIS; Minister of Justice; Minister for Media and Communications; Minister for Treaty of Waitangi Negotiations; Minister for Pacific Peoples; Minister for the Public Service and Digitising Government; Minister for Space; Minister for Veterans		Paul Goldsmith		List
Minister for the Community and Voluntary Sector; Minister for Disability Issues; Minister for Social Development and Employment; Minister of Tourism and Hospitality		Louise Upston	Minister for Child Poverty Reduction; Leader of the House	Taupō
Minister of Corrections; Minister for Emergency Management and Recovery; Minister for Ethnic Communities; Minister of Police; Minister for Sport and Recreation	Mark Mitchell	Mark Mitchell	Associate Minister for National Security and Intelligence	Whangaparāoa
Minister of Agriculture; Minister of Forestry; Minister for Trade	Todd McClay	Todd McClay	Associate Minister of Foreign Affairs	Rotorua
Minister of Conservation; Minister for Māori Crown Relations: Te Arawhiti; Minister for Māori Development; Minister for Whānau Ora	Tama Potaka	Tama Potaka	Associate Minister of Housing (Social Housing)	Hamilton West
Minister for Mental Health		Matt Doocey	Associate Minister of Health	Waimakariri
Minister for Building and Construction; Minister of Climate Change; Minister of Local Government; Minister of Revenue		Simon Watts	Minister for Auckland	North Shore
Minister for Tertiary Education; Minister of Science, Innovation and Technology		Penny Simmonds	Associate Minister for Social Development and Employment	Invercargill
ACT ministers
Deputy Prime Minister; Minister for Regulation		David Seymour	Associate Minister of Education (Partnership Schools); Associate Minister of Finance; Associate Minister of Health (Pharmac); Associate Minister of Justice (Treaty Principles Bill)	Epsom
Minister of Internal Affairs; Minister for Workplace Relations and Safety		Brooke van Velden		Tāmaki
Minister for Courts		Nicole McKee	Associate Minister of Justice (Firearms)	List
New Zealand First ministers
Minister of Foreign Affairs; Minister for Racing; Minister for Rail		Winston Peters		List
Minister for Oceans and Fisheries; Minister for Regional Development; Minister for Resources		Shane Jones	Associate Minister of Finance; Associate Minister for Energy	List
Minister of Customs; Minister for Seniors		Casey Costello	Associate Minister of Health; Associate Minister for Immigration; Associate Minister for Police	List
Ministers outside Cabinet
Minister of State for Trade; Minister for the Environment; Minister for Women		Nicola Grigg	Associate Minister for ACC	Selwyn
Minister for Hunting and Fishing; Minister for Youth		James Meager	Minister for the South Island; Associate Minister of Transport	Rangitata
Minister for ACC; Minister of Statistics		Scott Simpson	Deputy Leader of the House	Coromandel
Minister of Commerce and Consumer Affairs; Minister for Small Business and Manufacturing		Cameron Brewer	Associate Minister of Immigration	Upper Harbour
Minister for Land Information		Mike Butterick	Associate Minister of Agriculture	Upper Harbour
Minister for Biosecurity; Minister for Food Safety		Andrew Hoggard	Associate Minister of Agriculture (Animal Welfare, Skills); Associate Minister for the Environment	List
Minister for Children; Minister for the Prevention of Family and Sexual Violence		Karen Chhour		List
Minister for Rural Communities		Mark Patterson	Associate Minister of Agriculture; Associate Minister for Regional Development	List
Parliamentary under-secretaries
Parliamentary Under-Secretary to the Minister for Infrastructure and Minister for RMA Reform		Simon Court		List
Parliamentary Under-Secretary to the Minister for Media and Communications and Minister for Oceans and Fisheries		Jenny Marcroft		List

== Committees ==
A Cabinet committee comprises a subset of the larger Cabinet, consisting of a number of ministers who have responsibility in related areas of policy. Cabinet committees go into considerably more detail than can be achieved at regular Cabinet meetings, discussing issues which do not need the input of ministers holding unrelated portfolios. Committee terms of reference and membership are determined by the prime minister and the exact number and makeup of committees changes with the government. There are eight Cabinet committees in August 2026:

- Cabinet Appointments and Honours Committee (APH)
- Cabinet Business Committee (CBC)
- Cabinet Economic Policy Committee (ECO)
- Cabinet Expenditure and Regulatory Review Committee (EXP)
- Cabinet Foreign Policy and National Security Committee (FPS)
- Cabinet Legislation Committee (LEG)
- Cabinet Social Outcomes Committee (SOU)
- Cabinet Strategy Committee (STR)

Cabinet committees will often discuss matters under delegated authority or directly referred to them by Cabinet, and then report back the results of their deliberation. This can sometimes become a powerful tool for advancing certain policies, as was demonstrated in the Lange government. Minister of Finance Roger Douglas and his allies succeeded in dominating the finance committee, enabling them to determine what it recommended to Cabinet. The official recommendation of the finance committee was much harder for his opponents to fight than his individual claims in Cabinet would be. Douglas was able to pass measures that, had Cabinet deliberated on them itself rather than pass them to committee, would have been defeated.

== See also ==
- New Zealand Cabinet Office
- Shadow Cabinet of New Zealand
- List of New Zealand governments
- Category:Members of the Cabinet of New Zealand
