= Private =

Private or privates may refer to:

== Music ==
- "In Private", by Dusty Springfield from the 1990 album Reputation
- Private (band), a Denmark-based band
- "Private" (Ryōko Hirosue song), from the 1999 album Private, written and also recorded by Ringo Sheena
- "Private" (Vera Blue song), from the 2017 album Perennial

== Literature ==
- Private (novel), 2010 novel by James Patterson
- Private (novel series), young-adult book series launched in 2006

== Film and television ==
- Private (film), 2004 Italian film
- Private (web series), 2009 web series based on the novel series
- Privates (TV series), 2013 BBC One TV series
- Private, a penguin character in Madagascar

== Other uses ==
- Private (rank), a military rank
- Privates (video game), 2010 video game
- Private (rocket), American multistage rocket
- Private Media Group, Swedish adult entertainment production and distribution company
- Private (magazine), flagship magazine of the Private Media Group
- Privates, or Intimate parts, a euphemism for human genitals

== See also ==
- Privacy (disambiguation)
- Private methods, a means of encapsulation in object-oriented programming
- Private military company
- Private school
- Private university
- Privately held company
- Private sector
- Privatization
