= New Zealand Cabinet Office =

In New Zealand, the Cabinet Office is an executive office within the Department of the Prime Minister and Cabinet that acts as a secretariat for Cabinet, the Executive Council and Cabinet Committees. It provides constitutional, policy and procedural advice to the Governor-General, Executive and Parliament on a range of administrative matters, including procedures, appointments, and the general administration of Cabinet and its committees. It is situated in the Beehive.

== History ==
The Cabinet Office grew out of the Colonial Secretary's office with the establishment of the Cabinet Secretary in 1856. The role of the Cabinet Secretary was formally separated out of the Colonial Secretary's office in 1892, and around the turn of the century, the position became associated with the Prime Minister's Office, although research to date has not determined when this occurred.

Like the role of the Cabinet Secretary, the Cabinet Office was not established through any written constitution or legislative instrument. Its current position sits within the Department of Prime Minister and Cabinet (DPMC), established in 1989.

The first Cabinet Manual was compiled by the Office in 1979 as a consolidation of the rules, procedures, and conventions of the Cabinet. The Cabinet Manual is published by the office and is available on its website, although the initial versions were not publicly released.

Currently, the Cabinet Office still resides as a unit within DPMC, is headed by the Cabinet Secretary, and is ultimately responsible to the Prime Minister for recording Cabinet decisions and developing and administering Cabinet processes. This is set out in the Cabinet Manual.

== Key functions ==
Essentially, the Cabinet Office acts as the Executive's middle management to facilitate and guide the actions of higher levels of government. In this role its responsibilities include:

- Receiving and processing Ministerial submissions to Cabinet on issues such as policy, new legislation, key appointments, and financial appointments. The Office ensures these submissions meet the requirements set out in the Cabinet Manual and CabGuide.
- Preparing summaries of submissions for Ministers
- Manages and prepares the agenda for Cabinet and its committees, organises meetings, and maintains meeting records.
- Administering the New Zealand Royal Honours award system.
- Managing Government House.
- Acting as a channel of communication between the Governor-General and the Government
- Providing support for the organisation of elections and government formation.
- Supporting the transition of power between Governor-Generals and Prime Ministers.
- Briefing Ministers, ministerial staff and department officials on government and cabinet processes.

An additional important role held by the Office is to act as a guardian and author of the Cabinet Manual. This essential document guides and restricts the executive's actions. By updating the Cabinet Manual, the Office holds substantial power and controls New Zealand's executive constitutional arrangements. It also creates and updates the Cabguide website.

The head of the New Zealand Cabinet Office is also the Secretary of the Cabinet where they support Cabinet and its Committees. and Clerk of the Executive Council where they support the Executive Council and Governor-General. In this role, they function as a politically neutral link between a caretaker government and party leaders during the government formation period. They also assist the new Prime Minister in forming a New Government through advice on the structure and organisation of Cabinet, its committees and ministerial allocation.

== Cabinet Manual ==
New Zealand does not have a written constitution compared to other countries. Rather it has an unwritten constitution that is made up of different documents such as Treaty of Waitangi, Bill of Rights Act 1688 and other English statutes. The Cabinet Manual is one part of the Constitution, it serves to consolidate many of the previously unwritten conventions through which our government operates. The first edition of the Cabinet Manual was published in 1979. 30 years before the manual was published, it had first been suggested by National Prime Minister Sidney Holland. Until 2001, The Cabinet Manual was previously called the Cabinet Office Manual.

The Cabinet Manual is an authoritative guide which outlines the main laws, rules, and New Zealand's constitutional conventions and provides information on how the Government operates. It is used as a guide for Ministers, their offices, and all those working within government. It is also a handy tool for those who don't work in government but like to learn about how the government operates and its procedures.

The manual provides an overview of the roles of public servants such as the governor-general, ministers, and the public service; the expectations of ministers and public servants; how the Cabinet makes decisions; how legislation is created and developed; and how government information is to be protected and handled.

The Cabinet Manual is a primary source of information on New Zealand's constitutional arrangements, as seen through the lens of the executive branch of government. It essentially guides the Cabinet's procedure and is approved at the first Cabinet meeting when a new government is in-house, to provide for the orderly re-commencement of the business of government.

As of 2023, there have been seven editions published. Since New Zealand does not have a written constitution, previous governments have acknowledged the importance and necessity for guidelines to govern their conduct while in office. The Cabinet Manual serves this purpose.

== Honours unit ==
The Honours Unit is responsible for the administration of the New Zealand Royal Honours System, which is a way New Zealand citizens can congratulate and recognise people's achievements and community service. The Unit is also responsible for the use of the titles "The Right Honourable" and "The Honourable", the acceptance of foreign honours by New Zealand citizens and General honours policy, as well as establishing new honours and awards.

The Honours system has seven elements: The Order of New Zealand (ONZ); The New Zealand Order of Merit (NZOM); The Queen's Service Order (QSO) and its associated Queen's Service Medal (QSM); New Zealand Gallantry Awards; New Zealand Bravery Awards; The New Zealand Arctic Medal (NZAM; and The New Zealand Distinguished Service Decoration (DSD).

The Royal Honours are awarded by the Sovereign on the advice of the Prime Minister. Lists containing Honours recipients are usually announced on the Sovereign's birthday and the New Year. Special awards such as Gallantry and Bravery are usually announced in special honours lists.

The title of "The Right Honourable" (Abbr "The Rt Hon") is granted to and held by the Governor-General, the Prime Minister, the Speaker of the House of Representatives and the Chief Justice. Their entitlement to use this title is held for life. The title of "The Honourable" (Abbr "The Hon") is a title granted to Members of the Executive, Judges on the High Court, Supreme Court and Court of Appeal while they hold office unless they already have the title of "The Right Honourable".

Institutions outside of New Zealand such as foreign governments or international organisations may wish to grant an honour to a New Zealand Citizen. Nominations and enquiries of this nature are directed and dealt with by the Honours Unit or the Protocol Division of the Ministry of Foreign Affairs and Trade.

Persons willing to make nominations for an honour must complete the appropriate nomination forms to submit to either the Prime Minister or the Honours Unit. The Honours Unit will then prepare a list of nominations to a Cabinet Committee chaired by the Prime Minister who considers the nominations.

== Constitutional advice and secretariat services ==
=== Constitutional advice ===
A critical function of the Cabinet Office is the provision of constitutional advice. This involves the analysis of New Zealand's governing laws and principles, including the Constitution Act 1986 and the Treaty of Waitangi. The Office ensures Cabinet decisions reflect these laws and principles, to protect the legitimacy and legality of government actions.

The provision of constitutional advice is a detailed process, and can include legal analysis, consultations, and coordination with different government departments. The rigid nature of these processes ensure that Cabinet decisions are legally and constitutionally sound.

During transitions of power, the Cabinet Office provides insight on the procedures to ensure a smooth transition, with minimal disruption and heightened trust. This involves advice on the establishment of new government structures and ministers, to ensure stability over time.

The Cabinet Office also values the importance of the Treaty of Waitangi in decision-making. As the founding document establishing the relationship between the Crown and Maori, principles of the Treaty must be considered - this is vital in protecting Maori interests during government action.

In general, the Cabinet Office's constitutional advice helps maintain the rule of law, uphold democratic principles, and protect the rights of citizens in New Zealand.

=== Secretariat services ===
Secretariat Services provided by the Cabinet Office are impartial and encourage efficiency of the Cabinet and its committees. These services manage the logistics of Cabinet meetings, including agenda preparation and the distribution of documents. All of the most pressing information must be made available to ministers promptly so that informed decisions can be made.

The Cabinet Office is also responsible for maintaining the official records of Cabinet proceedings. Diligent record-keeping is highly important for transparency and accountability measures, strengthening general trust towards the government.

All secretariat services have been improved with technology innovations, heightening efficiency and a commitment to modernisation. At times, rapid decision-making is necessary and these must be documented and implemented coherently. The Office strives to be consistently responsive, and offers strong support for crisis management.

Additionally, the Office supports various Cabinet committees, which each focus on specific areas of policy and administration. These committees can function effectively, and develop higher-level coordination with government policies, when provided with administrative support and guidance by the Cabinet Office.
