= Privacy Act =

Privacy Act may refer to:

- Privacy Act of 1974, United States
- Privacy Act (Canada)
- Privacy Act 1988 (Cth.), Australia
- Privacy Act 2020, New Zealand
