= Bruce Slane =

New Zealand public servant and lawyer

Sir Bruce Houlton Slane KNZM CBE (10 August 1931 – 7 January 2017) was a New Zealand public servant and lawyer. He served as New Zealand's first Privacy Commissioner from 1992 to 2003.

== Early life and family ==
Slane was educated at Takapuna Grammar School and Auckland University, graduating with a law degree in 1957. He married Penelope Slane (née Grant), with whom he had three children. The Slanes separated around 2001.

== Career ==
He became a partner at the law firm run by Jock Cairns, later known as Cairns Slane Fitzgerald and Phillips. He was involved in the broadcasting industry as a radio commentator under the pseudonym "Bruce Christopher" and as chair of the Broadcasting Tribunal from 1977 to 1990. He additionally served as president of the New Zealand Law Society from 1982 to 1985.

Slane was appointed New Zealand's first Privacy Commissioner in April 1992, under the Privacy Commissioner Act 1991. He assisted the government with the development of the Privacy Act 1993, which provided for the continuation of his role and outlined its functions at a time when the advent of computers increased risks to personal information. Slane held office until 2003, when he retired.

== Honours and awards ==
In the 1985 New Year Honours, Slane was named a Commander of the Order of the British Empire, in recognition of his service as president of the New Zealand Law Society. He was appointed a Distinguished Companion of the New Zealand Order of Merit, for services to personal and human rights and the law, in the 2003 New Year Honours. He accepted the redesignation as a Knight Companion of the New Zealand Order of Merit in 2009, following the reintroduction of titular honours by the New Zealand government.

== Family and later years ==
Sir Bruce Slane died on 7 January 2017, ten days after his wife Lady Penelope Slane died on 28 December 2016.

In 2018 and 2023, milestone anniversary years of the Privacy Act 1993, Slane has been remembered in the Sir Bruce Slane memorial lecture.
