= Privates (video game) =

2010 video game

- Developer: Size Five Games
- Publisher: Size Five Games
- Programmer: Dan Marshall
- Engine: Unity
- Platform: Windows
- Release: 6 August 2010
- Genre: Multidirectional shooter
- Mode: Single-player

Privates is a freeware twin-stick shooter video game developed and published by Size Five Games (formerly Zombie Cow Studios) and commissioned by Channel 4 as a sex education tool. It was published on 6 August 2010 for Windows. Privates was positively received by critics and won a BAFTA Award.

== Gameplay ==
The player plays as a squad of miniature Marines wearing condom hats who are sent into various people's vaginas and rectums, as well as other parts of the body, in order to kill real-life sexually transmitted infections (STI), which are depicted as monsters. The right weapons must be used to destroy them, which include anti-bacterial and anti-viral guns. The player can order their squad, which consists of up to three additional Marines besides the player, to attack certain enemy types while they cover the others.

== Plot ==
The main character is Jack, who commands Foxtrot Squad. The squad, whose members have been deemed too useless by the "top brass", is forced to embark on a dangerous mission with a combat veteran in the hopes that they will either "shape up" or die.

== Development ==
The game was funded by Channel 4, in order to promote safe sex for teenage boys. Developer Dan Marshall compared the game to Gunstar Heroes in its design. He called his Google Search history when making the game "eclectic, horrific and embarrassing", saying that "if my ISP are snooping on me, they're presumably pretty concerned about my well-being", and saying that the game's artist was "constantly getting sent stuff he desperately didn't want to look at". He also said that his eyes were "opened" about sexual health, and realised how easy STIs were to transmit.

The game was rejected from release on the Xbox 360 by Microsoft after being advised that it would fail peer review due to its overly sexual content. This decision was derided by critics, with Destructoid saying "I think it's very disturbing that we have a culture where deplorable violence is considered normal, but sex [...] is treated like something freakish and wrong".

== Reception ==
Eurogamer said that it was "genuinely refreshing to experience something that gets straight to the point" about sexual health, pointing to "frightening" statistics amongst teenagers. Rock, Paper, Shotgun praised the game's writing and music, despite remarking on some audio issues.

The game was criticised by a feminist blog, Hoyden About Town, for being "misogynist". In a counter-argument by Lewis Denby of Gamasutra, he said that the game does not try to send the message that women's genitals are "filthy and disease-ridden", but rather was a "great idea" due to its focus on sexual education, calling the article "tremendously bad reporting", but ultimately admitting that "the author has a point" and that humorous games about "serious issues" will always be open to criticism.
