= Size Five Games =

British video game developer

- Type: Private
- Industry: Video games
- Founded: 2008
- Founder: Dan Marshall
- Products: Gibbage; Time Gentlemen, Please!
- Website: www.sizefivegames.com

Size Five Games (formerly Zombie Cow Studios) is a British independent video game developer founded by Dan Marshall in 2008. Dan Marshall's previous games, Gibbage and Cruxade were retroactively brought under the Zombie Cow banner upon its founding.

== History ==
Their first new release was a donationware adventure game called Ben There, Dan That!, released in 2008. It was widely praised by the adventure game community and downloaded 50,000 times but brought in only "a couple of hundred quid" due to its donation model. Marshall self-funded the game's development, telling the BBC in 2010 "What I do keeps me fed and warm. I'm not sure I get to lead the most extravagant lifestyle, or how my earnings compare to people working in the mainstream games industry." Marshall later said of the game "I didn't think people would really pay money for it ... I think that was a bit naive, in retrospect. It's well worth a couple of quid, and I do regret not charging for it initially. You can always move the price down, you can't really move it up." A 2011 updated edition of the game, which added a soundtrack and other features, was sold on a "pay what you want" model, with a minimum price.

The sequel, Time Gentlemen, Please!, was released in 2009 to positive reviews. PC Gamer called it "point-and-click adventuring done right for a change." It holds a Metacritic score of 84%. Both Ben There, Dan That! and Time Gentlemen, Please! were later made available for purchase on Steam and GOG.com.

In 2010, Zombie Cow Studios released Privates, a sex education game funded by Channel 4 and intended to match the "personal, social, and health education" guidelines of the National Curriculum The Xbox 360 version was cancelled when Microsoft confirmed that the game contravened the Xbox Live guidelines on sexual content of games, but the company released the Microsoft Windows version for free download from Channel 4's website. The game won a BAFTA Award in the "Learning - Secondary" category.

In May 2011, Zombie Cow Studios changed their name to Size Five Games.

In 2013, Size Five Games released Gun Monkeys, a "procedurally-generated, physics-based, 1-on-1 online platform shooter" featuring the voice of English actor and comedian, Kevin Eldon.

In 2015, the studio released The Swindle, a stealth roguelike. In 2017, they released Behold the Kickmen, a parodic football game. In 2020, the studio released Lair of the Clockwork God, the third game in the Ben and Dan series.

== Games ==
- Gibbage (2006)
- Ben There, Dan That! (2008)
- Cruxade (2008)
- Time Gentlemen, Please! (2009)
- Privates (2010)
- Gun Monkeys (2013)
- The Swindle (2015)
- Behold the Kickmen (2017)
- Lair of the Clockwork God (2020)
- Earth Must Die (2026)
