= Cabinet Manual (New Zealand) =

The Cabinet Manual (previously the Cabinet Office Manual until 2001) is a government document in New Zealand which outlines the main laws, rules and constitutional conventions affecting the operation of the New Zealand Government. It has been described as providing "comprehensive, cohesive and clear advice on a number of key aspects of executive action. It is publicly available, and broadly accepted by a wide range of actors in New Zealand politics: politicians across the spectrum, officials, academics and the public."

Among its guidelines, the manual gives an overview of the roles of the governor-general, ministers, and the public service; expectations about the conduct of ministers and public servants; Cabinet procedures for decision-making; how a government is formed after an election; how legislation is developed by the government and Parliament; and the protection and use of information held by the government.

Written by the Cabinet Office, the Cabinet Manual is endorsed at the first Cabinet meeting of a new government. It was published most recently in 2023.

== Contents ==
1. Introduction

- Overview of the Cabinet Manual as a guide for constitutional conventions and governmental practices.
- Clarifies that the manual is not legally binding but reflects accepted practices.

2. The Executive

- Discusses the executive branch's structure, composed of the governor-general, prime minister, and other ministers.
- Emphasises the governor-general's constitutional role and the convention that they act on the advice of the prime minister.

3. The Formation of the Executive

- Details the process of forming the executive government, including the appointment of ministers.
- Discusses how ministers are chosen from elected members of Parliament (MPs).

4. Cabinet

- Defines Cabinet as the senior decision-making body of the government.
- Explains the principle of collective responsibility, where all Cabinet members are collectively accountable for government decisions.
- Highlights Cabinet confidentiality, ensuring that discussions and decisions remain private.

5. Cabinet Committees

- Describes various Cabinet committees responsible for specific policy areas.
- Explains their functions and procedures, including how they report to the full Cabinet.

6. Cabinet Decision-Making

- Outlines the process of making decisions within Cabinet, emphasising consensus and collective agreement.
- Explains the role of the prime minister in guiding Cabinet decisions.

7. Cabinet and Parliamentary Government

- Discusses the relationship between Cabinet and Parliament in the Westminster system.
- Emphasises the democratic principle that government is accountable to Parliament.

8. Ministerial Conduct

- Details the expected conduct of ministers, including financial interests, conflicts of interest, and the need for transparency.
- Addresses the personal, professional, and political responsibilities of ministers.

9. The Public Service

- Explores the relationship between Cabinet and the public service.
- Emphasises the public service's role in providing impartial advice to the government.

10. Public Finance

- Discusses Cabinet's role in financial matters, particularly the Budget process.
- Highlights the principles of responsible fiscal management and prudent financial decision-making.

11. International Relations

- Outlines Cabinet's role in shaping New Zealand's foreign policy.
- Addresses treaty-making, the use of the Defence Force, and the importance of consultation with Parliament.

12. Crisis Management

- Provides guidance on how Cabinet manages national emergencies and crises.
- Emphasises coordination, communication, and decision-making during critical situations.

13. Executive Government in New Zealand

- Summarises the fundamental principles and conventions that underpin executive government in New Zealand, drawing from the Westminster system's core tenets.

14. Constitutional Reform

- Discusses the procedures and considerations for constitutional reform.
- Explains how changes to constitutional matters, including amendments to the Cabinet Manual, are handled.

Appendices

- Include additional reference materials, templates, and documents related to Cabinet procedures and conventions.
- Provide practical resources for those involved in government activities.

== Background ==
New Zealand does not have a single codified constitutional document. The Cabinet Manual forms one part of the constitution of New Zealand, and serves to consolidate many of the previously unwritten conventions through which the New Zealand Government operates.

The first edition was published on 23 January 1979. The idea of such a document was proposed by Prime Minister Sidney Holland about 30 years prior. A foreword by Prime Minister Robert Muldoon in the first edition states:

It is timely that nearly 30 years after the late Sir Sidney Holland issued his directive to the Secretary of the Cabinet all the lore of the Cabinet system should be consolidated. This Manual has done that, and I commend it to Ministers and Departments. It will be useful to them in observing and setting the highest standards for the orderly and efficient conduct of the Government's business.

== See also ==
- Letters Patent Constituting the Office of Governor-General of New Zealand – a royal decree which outlines the role of the governor-general; it is appended to the manual
- Politics of New Zealand
- Cabinet Manual (United Kingdom) – a similar British government document that was modelled on the New Zealand manual
