= New Zealand Budget =

Prepared by the New Zealand Treasury for the Minister of Finance

The New Zealand Budget is an annual statement by the New Zealand Government that outlines of the nation's revenues and expenditures for the preceding fiscal year and expectations for the next one. It is prepared by the New Zealand Treasury for the Minister of Finance. The Budget is usually presented to the House of Representatives in May.

== Budget statement ==
The Minister of Finance delivers the Budget statement, a speech in the House of Representatives with no time limit. In the Budget statement, the Minister may review the international economic outlook and the performance of the New Zealand economy, and outlines the Government's proposed economic and fiscal measures to deal with the assessed situation of the country.

Changes to social policy may also be made by the Budget. The Minister of Finance then moves the second reading of the main Appropriation Bill. Associated parliamentary papers are also presented. These papers include the Estimates of Appropriations, which are papers outlining the Government's spending plans.

The Budget statement is the start of the annual Budget debate, which lasts for up to 14 hours. This excludes the time taken to read the Budget Statement. This debate usually takes precedence over all other Government business and ensures the Budget is put under sustained scrutiny.

Following the delivery of the Budget, select committees examine the Estimates of Appropriations, a process that often involves the hearing of evidence from Ministers and government officials. Select committees must report on the "Votes" (areas of spending) allocated to them within two months of Budget Day, and the House then holds a further debate on the Government's spending plans (the Estimates debate).

Documents generally released at the time of the Budget:

- Appropriation (Estimates) Bill
- Budget Executive Summary
- Budget Speech and Fiscal Strategy Report
- Budget Economic and Fiscal Update
- Estimates of Appropriations for the Government of New Zealand
- Information Supporting the Estimates of Appropriations
- Statements of Intent
- Press statements
