= Lair of the Clockwork God =

- Developer: Size Five Games
- Publisher: Size Five Games
- Platforms: Microsoft Windows; macOS; Linux; Nintendo Switch; Xbox One; PlayStation 4
- Release: Microsoft Windows, macOS, Linux: WW: February 21, 2020; Nintendo Switch, Xbox One: WW: September 4, 2020; PlayStation 4: WW: November 6, 2020
- Genres: Point-and-click, platformer
- Mode: Single-player

Lair of the Clockwork God is a platforming and point-and-click game developed and published by Size Five Games for Microsoft Windows, macOS, Linux, Nintendo Switch, Xbox One and PlayStation 4 in 2020. It is the third game in the Ben and Dan Series.

== Gameplay ==
Lair of the Clockwork God is a two-dimensional side-scroller. Ben is controlled by the conventional point-and-click style, whereas Dan is controlled as a platformer, on a mission to recover a flower that can cure cancer.

== Reception ==
Reception

Aggregate scores
Aggregator	Score
Metacritic	PC: 84/100; XONE: 84/100; NS: 80/100
OpenCritic	95% recommend

The game received generally favorable reviews, according to review aggregator Metacritic.

According to Rock, Paper, Shotgun, Lair of the Clockwork God has a firm grasp on comedy, calling it a stress test for the rib cage. It goes on to say that it "celebrates the tension between old and new, and finds profound comedy in the juxtaposition". Per The Guardian, the game strikes an impressive balance between point and click games and platformers.
