= Waihopai =

Waihopai may refer to:

New Zealand:

- Waihopai River (Marlborough), in the north of the South Island
  - Waihopai Valley, Marlborough
  - Waihopai Station, a satellite monitoring station in the Waihopai Valley, often referred to as Waihopai spy base
- Waihopai River (Southland), in the south of the South Island
  - Waihōpai, the Māori name of Invercargill, Southland
  - Waihopai, Invercargill, suburb of Invercargill
  - Waihopai AFC, an association football club in Invercargill

Other:

- "Waihopai", a track by American band Tortoise on their box set A Lazarus Taxon
