= Marlborough District =

District and unitary authority of New Zealand

Coordinates: 41°53′S 173°40′E

Marlborough Te Tauihu-o-te-waka
- Territorial authority, region and district
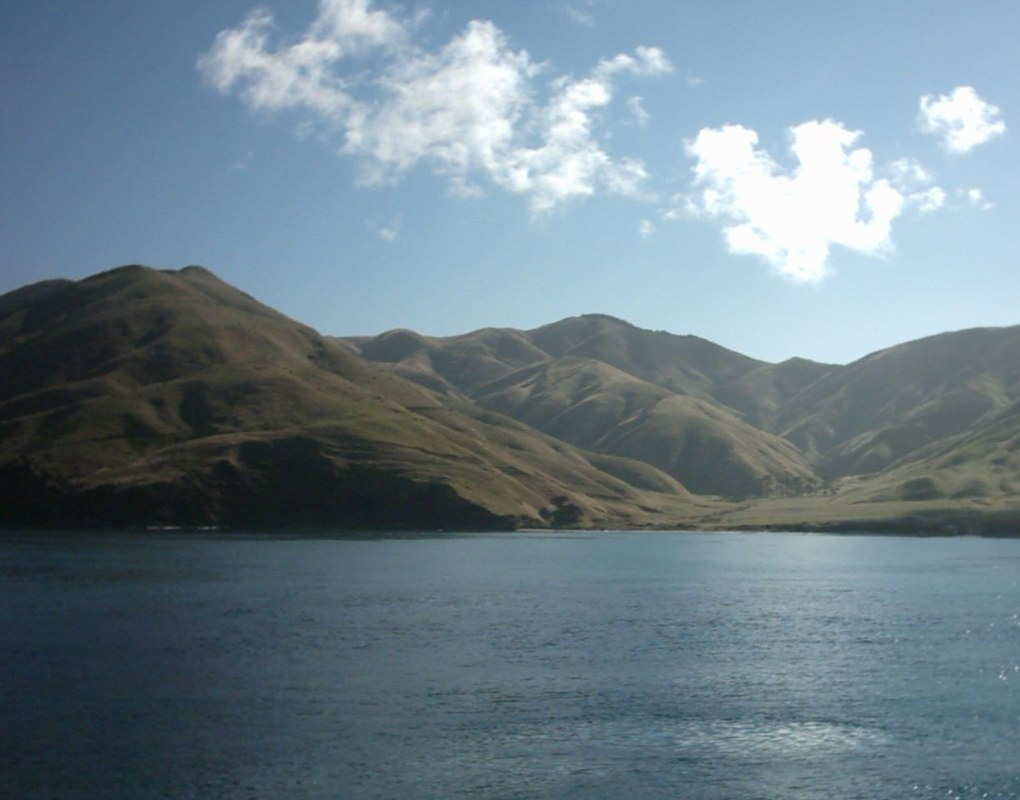
- The Marlborough Sounds seen from the Wellington–Picton ferry

- Marlborough within New Zealand
- Country: New Zealand
- District: 1989
- Unitary authority: 1992
- Seat: Blenheim
- Wards: Blenheim; Marlborough Sounds; Wairau-Awatere

Government
  - Body: Marlborough District Council
  - Mayor: Nadine Taylor
  - Deputy mayor: David Croad

Area
  - Total: 12,484.59 km^{2} (4,820.33 sq mi)
  - Land: 10,457.89 km^{2} (4,037.81 sq mi)

Population (June 2025)
  - Total: 50,800
  - Density: 4.86/km^{2} (12.6/sq mi)

GDP
  - Total: NZ$3.466 billion (2021) (13th)
  - Per capita: NZ$67,045 (2021)
- Time zone: UTC+12:00 (NZST)
  - Summer (DST): UTC+13:00 (NZDT)
- Postcode(s): Map of postcodes
- Area code: 03
- ISO 3166 code: NZ-MBH
- HDI (2023): 0.937 very high · 5th
- Website: www.marlborough.govt.nz

Marlborough District or the Marlborough Region (Māori: Te Tauihu-o-te-waka, or Tauihu), commonly known simply as Marlborough, is one of the 16 regions of New Zealand, located on the northeast of the South Island. It is administered by Marlborough District Council, a unitary authority, performing the functions of both a territorial authority and a regional council. The council is based at Blenheim, the largest town. The unitary region has a population of 50,800 (June 2025). It borders the Nelson Region and Tasman District to the west, and the Canterbury Region to the south.

Marlborough is known for its dry climate, the Marlborough Sounds, and Sauvignon blanc wine. It takes its name from the earlier Marlborough Province, which was named after John Churchill, 1st Duke of Marlborough, an English general and statesman.

== Geography ==
Marlborough's geography can be roughly divided into four sections. The south and west sections are mountainous, particularly the southern section, which rises to the peaks of the Kaikōura Ranges. These two mountainous regions are the final northern vestiges of the ranges that make up the Southern Alps, although that name is rarely applied to mountains this far north.

Between those two sections is the long, straight valley of the Wairau River. This broadens to wide plains at its eastern end, in the centre of which stands the town of Blenheim. This region has fertile soil and temperate weather, which has enabled it to become the centre of the New Zealand wine industry.

The fourth geographic zone lies along its north coast. Here, the drowned valleys of the Marlborough Sounds make for a convoluted and attractive coastline. The town of Picton is located at the southern end of one of the larger sounds, Queen Charlotte Sound. The town of Havelock is at the southern end of the Pelorus Sound; this sound feeds into Kenepuru Sound.

=== Climate ===
In line with most of New Zealand, the Marlborough region has a temperate oceanic climate (Köppen Cfb) with warm summers, cool winters, and rainfall distributed across the year.

Climate data for Blenheim, 1981–2010 normals
Month	Jan	Feb	Mar	Apr	May	Jun	Jul	Aug	Sep	Oct	Nov	Dec	Year
Mean daily maximum °C (°F)	24.1 (75.4)	23.8 (74.8)	21.9 (71.4)	19.0 (66.2)	16.0 (60.8)	13.3 (55.9)	12.6 (54.7)	13.8 (56.8)	15.8 (60.4)	18.0 (64.4)	20.0 (68.0)	22.2 (72.0)	18.4 (65.1)
Daily mean °C (°F)	18.0 (64.4)	17.6 (63.7)	15.8 (60.4)	13.0 (55.4)	10.2 (50.4)	7.7 (45.9)	7.0 (44.6)	8.2 (46.8)	10.3 (50.5)	12.2 (54.0)	14.2 (57.6)	16.5 (61.7)	12.6 (54.7)
Mean daily minimum °C (°F)	11.8 (53.2)	11.5 (52.7)	9.8 (49.6)	6.9 (44.4)	4.5 (40.1)	2.2 (36.0)	1.5 (34.7)	2.6 (36.7)	4.7 (40.5)	6.5 (43.7)	8.4 (47.1)	10.8 (51.4)	6.8 (44.2)
Average precipitation mm (inches)	48.9 (1.93)	49.4 (1.94)	46.5 (1.83)	52.7 (2.07)	60.6 (2.39)	70.7 (2.78)	74.3 (2.93)	62.2 (2.45)	65.2 (2.57)	67.4 (2.65)	55.0 (2.17)	58.1 (2.29)	711.0 (27.99)
Average precipitation days (≥ 1.0 mm)	5.0	5.1	5.5	5.3	6.7	7.9	7.6	8.0	8.5	8.3	6.9	6.7	81.5
Average relative humidity (%)	68.7	74.2	74.9	77.5	81.5	82.3	83.7	80.8	73.3	72.1	67.7	67.5	75.4
Mean monthly sunshine hours	262.2	223.7	230.8	193.7	172.7	151.6	157.1	183.9	189.5	226.7	234.7	248.8	2,475.3
Source: NIWA Climate Data

== Demography ==
Marlborough District covers 10,457.89 km^{2} (4,037.81 sq mi) and had an estimated population of 50,800 as of June 2025, with a population density of 4.9 people per km^{2}. The district is home to 1.0% of New Zealand's population.

Historical population
Year	Pop.	±% p.a.
1991	35,148	—
1996	38,397	+1.78%
2001	39,561	+0.60%
2006	42,558	+1.47%
2013	43,416	+0.29%
2018	47,340	+1.75%
2023	49,431	+0.87%

Marlborough District had a population of 49,431 in the 2023 New Zealand census, an increase of 2,091 people (4.4%) since the 2018 census, and an increase of 6,015 people (13.9%) since the 2013 census. There were 24,594 males, 24,681 females and 156 people of other genders in 20,187 dwellings. 2.6% of people identified as LGBTIQ+. The median age was 46.1 years (compared with 38.1 years nationally). There were 8,232 people (16.7%) aged under 15 years, 7,119 (14.4%) aged 15 to 29, 22,239 (45.0%) aged 30 to 64, and 11,838 (23.9%) aged 65 or older.

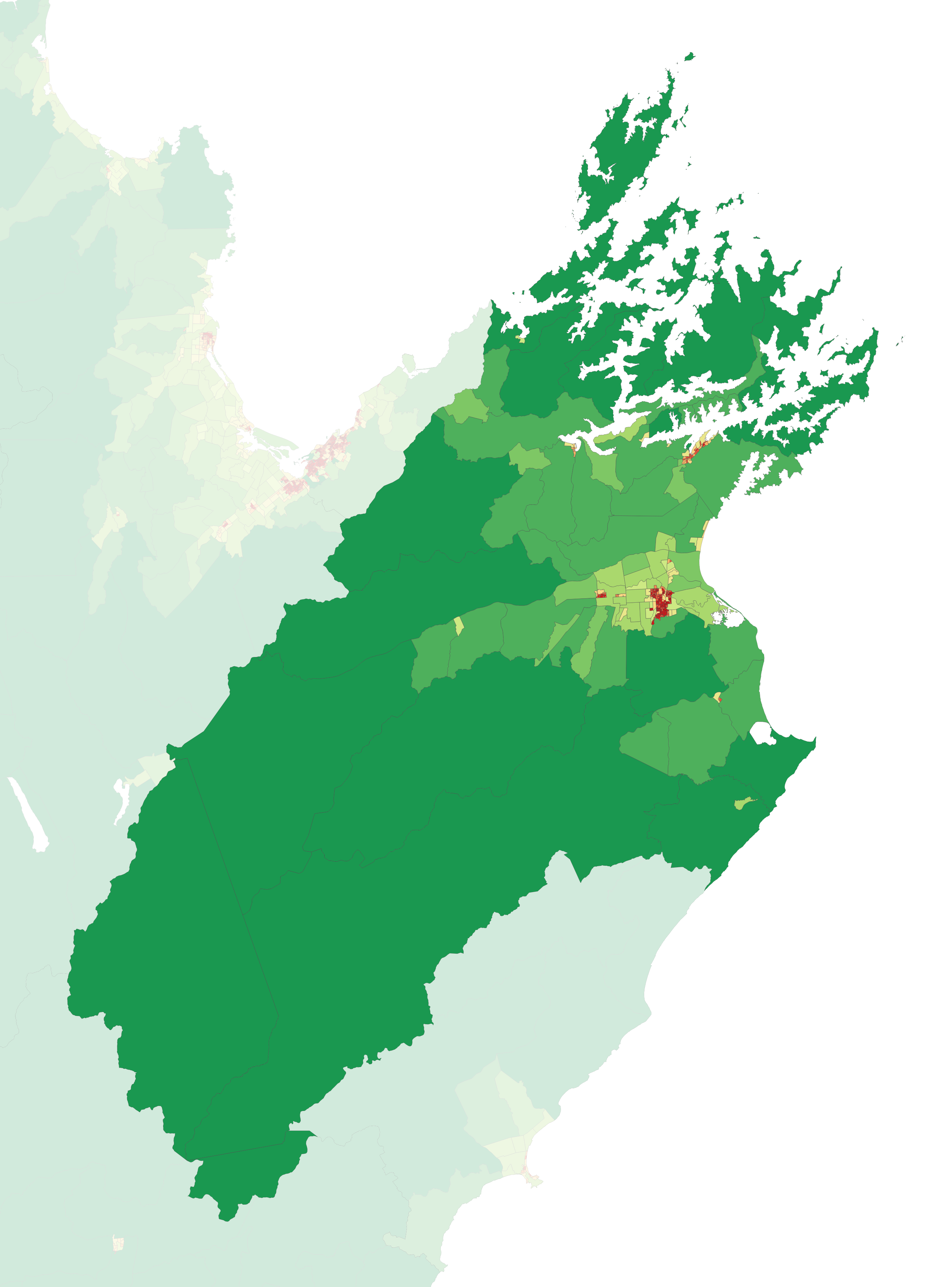
Population density in the 2023 census

People could identify as more than one ethnicity. The results were 85.9% European (Pākehā); 14.9% Māori; 3.7% Pasifika; 5.4% Asian; 1.5% Middle Eastern, Latin American and African New Zealanders (MELAA); and 3.0% other, which includes people giving their ethnicity as "New Zealander". English was spoken by 97.5%, Māori language by 2.8%, Samoan by 0.7% and other languages by 9.4%. No language could be spoken by 1.6% (e.g. too young to talk). New Zealand Sign Language was known by 0.4%. The percentage of people born overseas was 19.5, compared with 28.8% nationally.

Religious affiliations were 30.6% Christian, 0.8% Hindu, 0.3% Islam, 0.6% Māori religious beliefs, 0.7% Buddhist, 0.4% New Age, 0.1% Jewish, and 1.1% other religions. People who answered that they had no religion were 57.5%, and 8.1% of people did not answer the census question.

Of those at least 15 years old, 5,586 (13.6%) people had a bachelor's or higher degree, 22,905 (55.6%) had a post-high school certificate or diploma, and 10,971 (26.6%) people exclusively held high school qualifications. The median income was $39,400, compared with $41,500 nationally. 3,513 people (8.5%) earned over $100,000 compared to 12.1% nationally. The employment status of those at least 15 was that 20,424 (49.6%) people were employed full-time, 6,165 (15.0%) were part-time, and 699 (1.7%) were unemployed.

Individual wards
Name	Area (km^{2})	Population	Density (per km^{2})	Dwellings	Median age	Median income
Marlborough Sounds General Ward	2,606.78	9,003	3.5	4,158	55.6 years	$33,400
Wairau-Awatere General Ward	7,829.95	12,051	1.5	4,605	44.4 years	$47,900
Blenheim General Ward	21.17	28,374	1,340.3	11,424	43.1 years	$38,600
New Zealand					38.1 years	$41,500

=== Towns and settlements ===
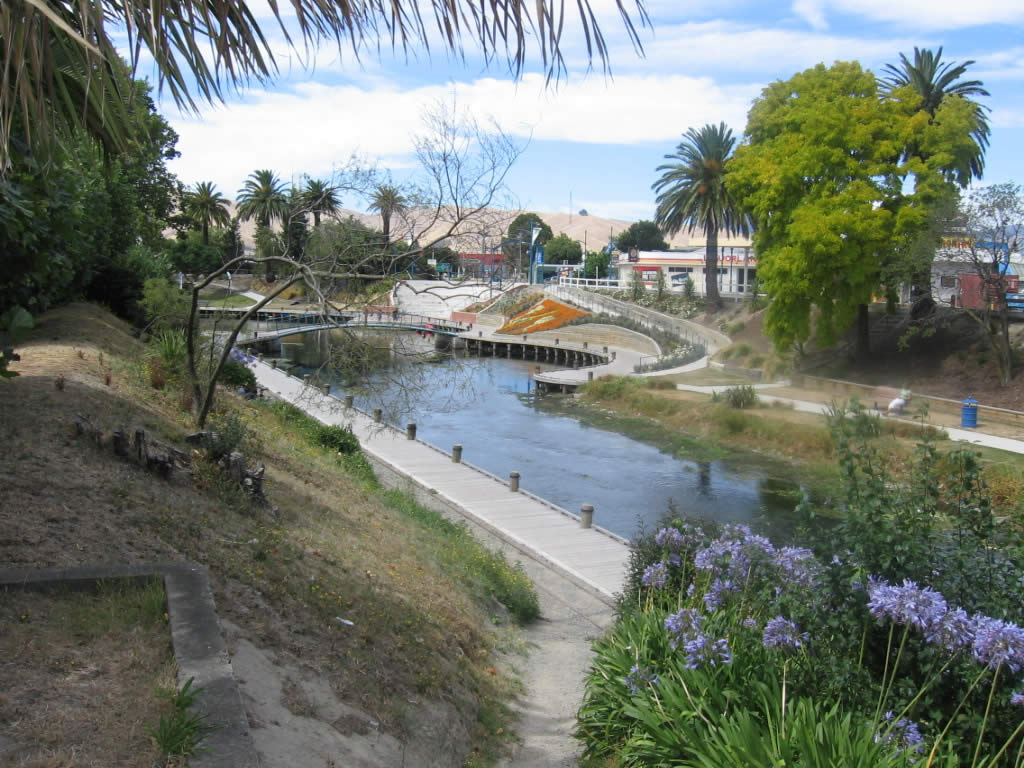
Blenheim

Marlborough has three towns with a population over 1,000. Together, they are home to 73.1% of the region's population.

Urban area	Population (June 2025)	% of region
Blenheim	29,800	58.7%
Picton	4,850	9.5%
Renwick	2,470	4.9%

Other towns and settlements include:

- Anakiwa
- Grovetown
- Havelock
- Ngākuta Bay
- Ōkiwi Bay
- Rai Valley
- Rārangi
- Seddon
- Spring Creek
- Tuamarina
- Waikawa
- Wairau Valley
- Ward
- Woodbourne

=== Culture and identity ===
Ethnicities in the 2018 New Zealand census were 87.8% European/Pākehā, 13.3% Māori, 3.1% Pacific peoples, 4.1% Asian, and 2.5% other ethnicities (totals add to more than 100% since people could identify with multiple ethnicities).

The proportion of Marlborough residents born overseas was 17.4%, compared with 27.1% nationally.

Although some people objected to giving their religion, 53.2% had no religion, 35.5% were Christian, 0.5% were Hindu, 0.1% were Muslim, 0.6% were Buddhist and 2.3% had other religions.

== Government and politics ==
Marlborough is administered by a unitary authority, the Marlborough District Council. Between 1859 and 1876 Marlborough had its own provincial government, and was known as the Marlborough Province, which ended when the Abolition of the Provinces Act came into force on 1 November 1876.

The Marlborough District Council consists of a mayor and 14 councillors. The councillors are elected from three wards: seven from the Blenheim ward, three each from the Marlborough Sounds and Wairau-Awatere wards, and one from the Marlborough Māori ward. The mayor is elected at-large. Elections are held every three years in conjunction with nationwide local elections, with the next election in 2025.

As of October 2022, the mayor and councillors are:

- Mayor: Nadine Taylor
- Councillors – Blenheim ward: Jamie Arbuckle, David Croad (deputy mayor), Deborah Dalliessi, Brian Dawson, Matt Flight, Jonathan Rosene, Thelma Sowman
- Councillors – Marlborough Sounds ward: Barbara Faulls, Raylene Innes, Ben Minehan
- Councillors – Wairau-Awatere ward: Scott Adams, Sally Arbuckle, Gerald Hope
- Councillors – Marlborough Māori Ward: Allanah Burgess

Nationally, Marlborough is part of the Kaikōura electorate, which also includes the Canterbury region north of the Ashley River / Rakahuri. For the Māori roll, Marlborough is part of the Te Tai Tonga electorate, as is the entire South Island. The electorate was first contested in the 1996 general election, the first under the new MMP voting system. From 1938 to 1996, the region was covered by the Marlborough electorate.

Marlborough is considered a safe area for the National Party, with the region held continuously by the party since the 1975 general election. Stuart Smith of the National Party has been the MP for the Kaikōura electorate since the 2014 general election. Tākuta Ferris from Te Pāti Māori has been the MP for the Te Tai Tonga electorate since 2023.

A combined District and High Court at Blenheim serves the region judicially.

== Economy ==
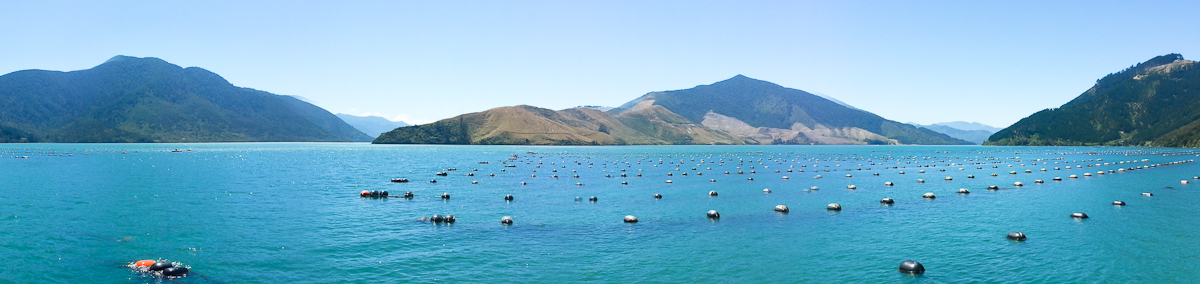
Green-lipped mussel farm beside Havelock

The subnational gross domestic product (GDP) of Marlborough was estimated at NZ$3.25 billion in the year to March 2019, 1.1% of New Zealand's national GDP. The regional GDP per capita was estimated at $66,277 in the same period. In the year to March 2018, primary industries contributed $650 million (21.3%) to the regional GDP, goods-producing industries contributed $1.55 billion (37.9%), service industries contributed $1.56 billion (51.2%), and taxes and duties contributed $260 million (8.6%).

=== Agriculture ===
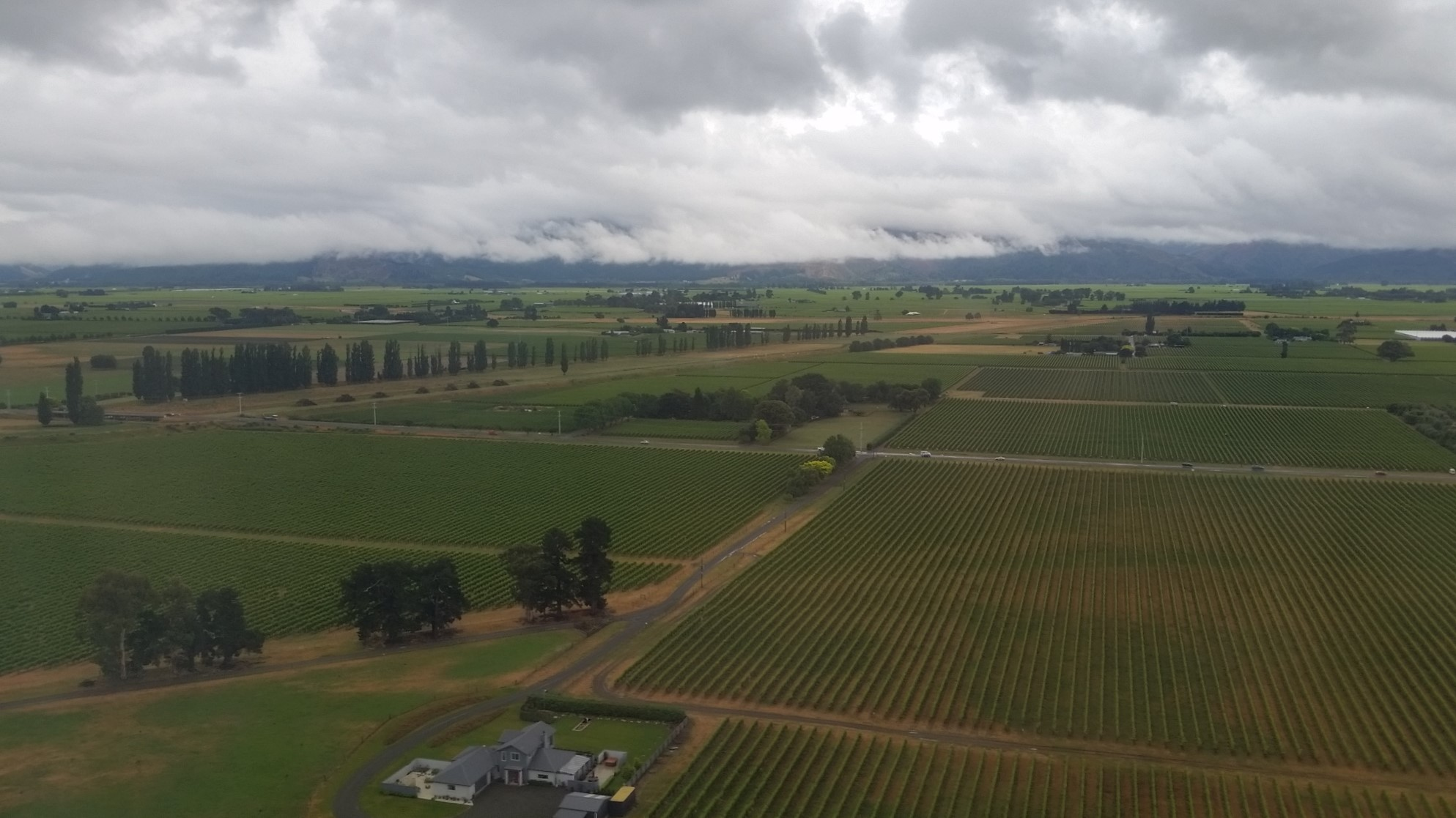
View of vineyards looking north from Blenheim

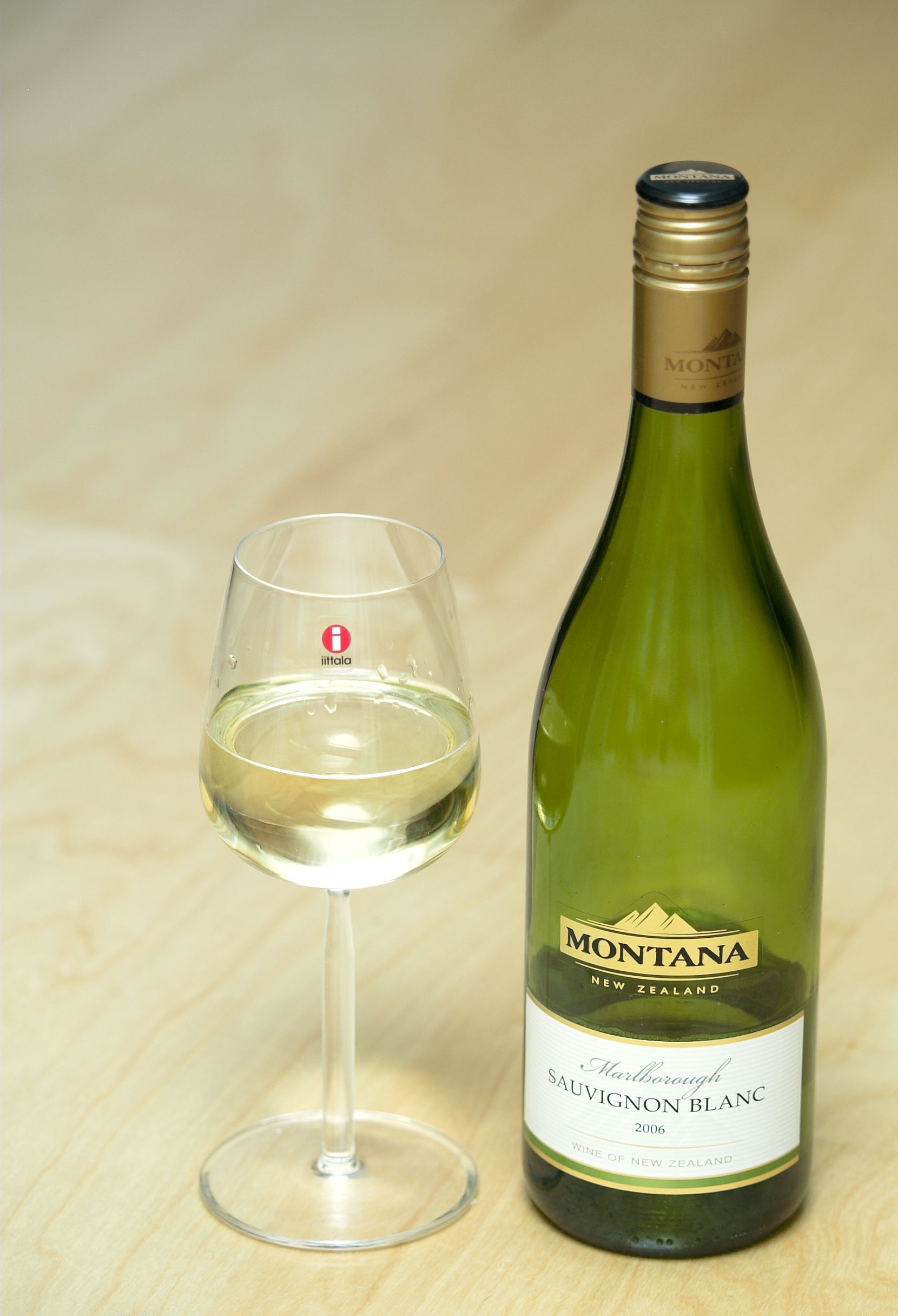
Montana Marlborough Sauvignon Blanc 2006

Marlborough has 25,045 hectares (61,890 acres) of horticultural land as of 2017, the second-largest area in New Zealand behind Canterbury. Wine grapes make up 23,050 hectares of that area, with sweetcorn and peas being the only other crops with more than 100 hectares of planted area.

The ripening period of wine grapes is extended by Marlborough's climate, which has a strong contrast between hot sunny days and cool nights. This results in more intense flavour and aroma characters in the wine. The first commercial vineyards were planted around Blenheim in 1973, and Marlborough subsequently grew to become New Zealand's largest and most internationally well-known wine-producing region. Due to this growth, particularly in the export market, the Marlborough wine region now produces three quarters of all New Zealand wine. The most important varietal is Sauvignon Blanc, which is recognised as world-class; wine writers Oz Clarke and George Taber have described Marlborough's Sauvignon Blanc as the best in the world. Also, important is the production of méthode traditionelle sparkling wine made from Chardonnay and Pinot Noir, which has attracted investment from large Champagne producers Mumm, Deutz, Moët & Chandon and Veuve Clicquot.

=== State security facilities ===
The New Zealand Defence Force operates RNZAF Base Woodbourne, co-located with Woodbourne Airport west of Blenheim.

The Waihopai communications monitoring facility, run by the Government Communications Security Bureau (GCSB) and part of the ECHELON network, is located in the Waihopai Valley 11 km (7 mi) southwest of Renwick.

== Transport ==
Marlborough is served by four state highways: State Highway 1, State Highway 6, State Highway 62, and State Highway 63. State Highway 1 is the main highway in the region, connecting Picton and Blenheim, and connecting the region south to Christchurch via Seddon and Kaikōura. State Highway 6 connects Blenheim and Renwick, and connects the region to Nelson and Tasman via Havelock. State Highway 63 leaves State Highway 6 at Renwick and travels via the Wairau Valley and Saint Arnaud to meet SH 6 again at Kawatiri, providing a direct route to the West Coast and bypassing Nelson. State Highway 62 is a short highway linking SH 1 at Spring Creek with SH 6 north of Renwick, providing a direct route between Picton and Nelson and bypassing Blenheim.

The Main North Line railway serves the region, running roughly parallel to State Highway 1. The first section of the line in Marlborough opened on 18 November 1875 between Blenheim and Picton. The line south of Blenheim opened to Seddon in October 1902, to Ward in April 1911, and to Wharanui in December 1915. The line finally opened across the present-day Marlborough border in October 1942 when the line was extended to Clarence. The entire line through to Christchurch opened on 15 December 1945 when the railheads met at Kaikōura. Today, the line is used by the Coastal Pacific passenger train, which operates one return journey per day during the summer months. The line is also heavily used by freight trains between Christchurch and the Cook Strait rail ferry at Picton.

Woodbourne Airport (trading as Marlborough Airport) is the region's main airport. Air New Zealand Link operates flights from Woodbourne to Auckland and Wellington and Sounds Air operates flights from Woodbourne to Wellington and Christchurch Airport. Sounds Air also operates flights from Picton Aerodrome to Wellington.

Port Marlborough at Picton is the region's main seaport. Interislander and Bluebridge both operate roll-on-roll-off ferry services between Picton and Wellington.

== Education ==
There are 29 primary and secondary schools in Marlborough. There are 22 state primary schools, one state intermediate school (Bohally Intermediate in Blenheim), three state secondary schools (Marlborough Boys' College and Marlborough Girls' College in Blenheim, and Queen Charlotte College in Picton), and one state area school (Rai Valley Area School). There are two state-integrated schools, one Catholic primary school and one Christian composite school, both in Blenheim.
