= Susan Price (book collector) =

New Zealand writer and book collector

Susan Diana Price ONZM (born 1960) is a New Zealand writer, historian, researcher, philanthropist and expert on and collector of children’s books. She lives in Wellington.

== Biography ==
Susan Diana Price was born in 1960 in Wellington. She spent five years in Sydney as a child but has lived the rest of her life in Wellington.

Her parents were publisher Hugh Price and children’s writer Beverley Randell, and she grew up in a family in which books were important. She recalls spending all her pocket money on new books, and cataloguing her book collection (some of them books gifted to her by her grandmother) as a teenager. Her collection at that stage included 350 children's book titles, and it continued to grow.

Her special interest in books relating to war and anti-war themes is reflected in one of her roles which is to select books for the youth section of the Kippenberger Library at the National Army Museum in Waiouru.

For some years, Price was a trustee of the Randell Cottage Writers' Trust. Randell Cottage in Thorndon was built in the 1860s and added to in the 1870s. It was bought by Price and her parents in 1994 and gifted to the Trust in 2001, to be used as a writers' residency.

== Philanthropy and donations ==
In 1991, Price donated her collection of children’s books (then numbering 5,000 titles) to the National Library of New Zealand. The Susan Price Collection, which now contains over 20,000 books, is currently housed in her own home under her curatorship but is open for researchers and visitors by appointment. It focuses on her selection of the best children’s books published in the English language from 1930 to today, including the work of over 70 New Zealand authors, and it is particularly strong in areas of historical fiction, non-fiction history books and books by publishers such as Puffin, Oxford, Ladybird, Dell Yearling and Hamish Hamilton.

In 2019, she donated Chevening, a restored block of four apartments at 90 Salamanca Rd near Victoria University of Wellington, to Heritage New Zealand Pouhere Taonga. Chevening was built in 1929 for Emma Margaret Rainforth, who was a maths teacher at Wellington Girls' College. It was designed by architect Llewellyn Williams, who designed several other significant buildings in Wellington including the Embassy Theatre, Kelvin Chambers and the Inverleith apartments in Oriental Bay. It was bought in a run-down state by Hugh Price and Beverley Randell in 1979 for $74,000. In 2011, Susan decided to restore and earthquake strengthen the building.

The restoration and the work of the team involved were recognised with several architectural awards including the Athfield Cup presented by the Wellington Branch of the New Zealand Institute of Architects in 2012, the New Zealand Architecture Award, Wellington Architecture Award, Heritage Category in 2012, the NZ Society for Earthquake Engineering Earthquake Strengthening Awards 2013 (Heritage Award) and Wellington Civic Trust Awards 2013: the Grant Tilly Memorial Award. This gift was also recognised when she was the recipient of one of the 2019 Wellington City Council Absolutely Positively Wellington (APW) awards.

She established the Susan Price Scholarship, which is awarded biannually to a Masters or PhD student at Victoria University of Wellington for research that will make use of the Susan Price Collection. She donated $20,000 to children's writer Kate De Goldi to help research children's literature. Over several decades, she has also gifted many books to more than 70 children of family and friends around New Zealand, sending out around 600 books a year on birthdays and special days such as Armistice Day.

== Honours ==
In the 2020 New Year Honours, Price was appointed an Officer of the New Zealand Order of Merit, for services to literature and philanthropy.

== Bibliography ==
- Books for Life (Gondwanaland Press, 1991)
- Charles and Annie Aller and their six daughters, written with Robin Allardyce (Gondwanaland Press, 2000)
- Old Wellington in Colour: from hundred year old picture post cards, written with Hugh Price (Steele Roberts, 2008)
- The Viaduct Postcard, illustrated by Judith Trevelyan (Millwood Heritage Productions, 2016)
- A mind of his own: the childhood of Hugh Price and Hugh Price Publisher, written with Beverley Randell (Steele Roberts, 2012)
