= Naval Communications Station Irirangi =

Royal New Zealand Navy base

Coordinates: 39.52824°S 175.66021°E

The Naval Communications Station Irirangi of the Royal New Zealand Navy, which is 2 km south of Waiouru and near the Waiouru Army Camp, was established in World War II (1943) as the Waiouru W/T (Wireless Telegraph) Station. Its location, in the middle of the North Island, put it far away from the sea.

The station was commissioned in July 1943, and at the peak period of the war had an establishment of about 150 personnel, of whom more than eighty were women, many from the Women's Royal New Zealand Naval Service. Tens of thousands of code groups were handled each day, mostly for the British Pacific Fleet in Japanese waters. A dozen or more circuits were operated simultaneously and teleprinter land lines fed the signals to the Navy Office in Wellington.

In 1951 the station was designated HMNZS Irirangi. ("Irirangi" is a Māori-language word, meaning "spirit voice".)

In the late 1980s the equipment was modernised, and in October 1991 a feasibility study into the remote controlling of all facilities from the Devonport Naval Base was completed. The Chief of Naval Staff issued a directive that "the remoting of Irirangi is to be implemented forthwith."

Irirangi was decommissioned on 20 May 1993. The Government Communications Security Bureau (GCSB) is now responsible for signals intelligence, with a radio communications intercept station at Tangimoana and a satellite communications intercept station at Waihopai. The previous functions of Irirangi are now carried out by a small contingent of Naval maintenance staff.

== See also ==
- Naval bases of the Royal New Zealand Navy
