= Anti-Bases Campaign =

Anti-Bases Campaign is an organisation campaigning to remove foreign military bases and intelligence installations from New Zealand, and to dismantle the Government Communications Security Bureau.

The group organises regular protests at the Government Communications Security Bureau base in the Waihopai valley and have published the Peace Researcher (ISSN 1173-2679) since its inception in 1983.

The group was founded by Owen Wilkes. According to the New Zealand Herald, "Claims by Wilkes in the early 1980s that the communications centre at Tangimoana in the lower North Island was actually an electronic spy station and part of an American worldwide network (Echelon) were immediately denied by the Government. Activists to this day are calling for the closure of Tangimoana and Waihopai base near Blenheim, another suspected spy base".
