= Sugar Grove Station =

NSA radio intercept site in West Virginia

Coordinates: 38.515°N 79.280°W

Sugar Grove Station is a National Security Agency (NSA) communications site located near Sugar Grove, West Virginia. According to a 2005 article in The New York Times, the site intercepts all international communications entering the Eastern United States. Activities at the site previously involved the Navy Information Operations Command (NAVIOCOM). In April 2013, the Chief of Naval Operations ordered that the NAVIOCOM support base be closed by September 30, 2015, as "a result of the determination by the resource sponsor National Security Agency to relocate the command's mission." As of 2017, the naval base is being repurposed as a privately owned healthcare facility for veterans, while the NSA listening station, to the south, continues to operate.

== History ==
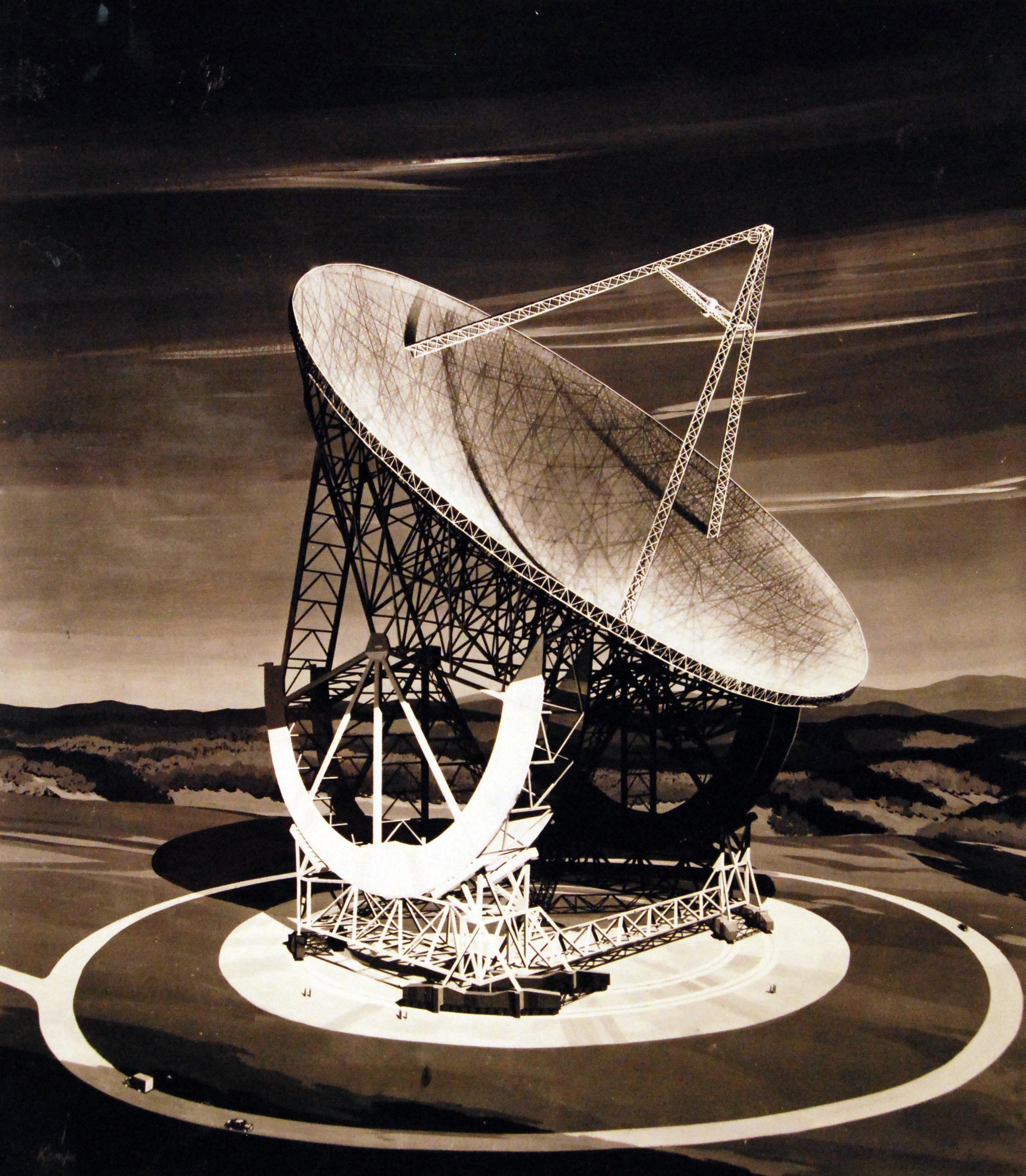
Artist conception of planned radiotelescope, 1959

The station was built by the Naval Research Laboratory in the early 1960s for a 600 ft (180 m) fully steerable radio telescope, intended to gather intelligence on Soviet radar and radio signals reflected from the Moon, and radioastronomical data from outer space, but the project was halted in 1962 before the telescope was completed. (Note: The primary contractor for the radio telescope was the General Dynamics Corporation. Philadelphia Gear Corporation (subcontracted by General Dynamics) developed the telescope's gear drives.) The site was then developed as a radio receiving station. Naval Radio Station Sugar Grove was activated on May 10, 1969, and two Wullenweber AN/FRD-10 Circulary Disposed Antenna Arrays (CDAAs) were completed on November 8, 1969. Numerous other antennas, dishes, domes, and other facilities were constructed in the following years. Some of the more significant radio telescopes on site are a 60 ft (18 m) dish (oldest telescope on site), a 105 ft (32 m) dish featuring a special waveguide receiver and a 150 ft (46 m) dish (largest telescope on site).

The site was part of the ECHELON communications network operated by the United States and its allies to intercept and process electronic telecommunications. The network operates many sites around the world, including Waihopai Valley in New Zealand, Menwith Hill in the United Kingdom and Yakima, Washington.

Sugar Grove is located in the United States National Radio Quiet Zone, which covers 13,000 square miles (34,000 km^{2}) in West Virginia and Virginia. The zone was established by Congress in 1958 to facilitate Sugar Grove's mission and that of the National Radio Astronomy Observatory, located 30 miles (48 km) away at Green Bank, West Virginia. Since 1984, a Quiet Zone administrator in Green Bank has overseen the NRQZ on behalf of both sites for all unclassified assignments.

On July 26, 2016, it was reported that the online auction for Sugar Grove Naval Station concluded on July 25 with a winning bid of $11.2 million. The transaction later failed and bidding was reopened that September. In 2017, the second auction resulted in a $4 million purchase by an Alabama-based investment group with plans to convert the base into a healthcare facility for active-duty military, veterans, and their families.
