= Tangimoana Station =

Coordinates: 40.314974°S 175.249845°E

The Tangimoana Station is a radio communications interception facility run by the New Zealand Government Communications Security Bureau. It is located 30 kilometres west of Palmerston North.

== Function ==
The station was opened in 1982, replacing an earlier facility at Irirangi, near Waiouru. According to the Federation of American Scientists (FAS), the facility is part of ECHELON, the worldwide network of signals interception facilities, run by the UKUSA (UK-USA Security Agreement) consortium of intelligence agencies (which shares global electronic and signals intelligence among the Intelligence agencies of the US, UK, Canada, Australia and NZ). Its role in this capacity was first identified publicly by peace researcher Owen Wilkes in 1984, and investigated in detail by peace activist and independent journalist Nicky Hager. The equipment at the Tangimoana facility "is equally capable of receiving signals transmitted by radio and satellite which do not include foreign intelligence and which are domestic concerning and involving NZ citizens." The facility cost about NZ$1.4 million.

The history of the site was restricted for 100 years, but a copy of the document was accidentally sent to Archives New Zealand.

== See also ==
- Waihopai Station
- New Zealand intelligence agencies
- New Zealand Security Intelligence Service
- Anti-Bases Campaign
