= Bruce Foster (photographer) =

New Zealand photographer (born 1948)

- Born: Bruce Robert Foster; 1948 (age 77–78)
- Occupation: Photographer
- Partner: Kate De Goldi

Bruce Robert Foster (born 1948) is a New Zealand photographer. His work is in the collections of the Museum of New Zealand Te Papa Tongarewa and the Auckland Art Gallery Toi o Tāmaki.

Foster's partner is the writer Kate De Goldi.
