= Waihopai Valley =

- Interactive map of Waihopai Valley
- Coordinates: 41.615°S 173.647°E
- Country: New Zealand
- Region: Marlborough
- Ward: Wairau-Awatere General Ward; Marlborough Māori Ward
- Electorates: Kaikōura; Te Tai Tonga (Māori)

Government
  - Territorial Authority: Marlborough District Council
  - Marlborough District Mayor: Nadine Taylor
  - Kaikōura MP: Stuart Smith
  - Te Tai Tonga MP: Tākuta Ferris

Area
  - Total: 921.49 km^{2} (355.79 sq mi)

Population (2023 census)
  - Total: 435
  - Density: 0.472/km^{2} (1.22/sq mi)

Waihopai Valley is an area near Blenheim in the Marlborough region of the South Island of New Zealand. The Waihopai River drains the area.

The Government Communications Security Bureau operates what it describes as a satellite communications monitoring facility in the Waihopai Valley, which it calls GCSB Waihopai. It has been identified as being a part of ECHELON, the worldwide network of signals interception facilities run by the UKUSA consortium of intelligence agencies.

The lower Waihopai, as it runs into the Wairau Valley, has a number of vineyards. From 1925 to 1927 a small hydroelectric power station was built in the valley. It is now operated by TrustPower.

== Demographics ==
Waihopai Valley covers 921.49 km^{2} (355.79 sq mi). It is part of the larger Upper Wairau statistical area.

Historical population
Year	Pop.	±% p.a.
2006	369	—
2013	411	+1.55%
2018	414	+0.15%
2023	435	+0.99%

Waihopai Valley had a population of 435 in the 2023 New Zealand census, an increase of 21 people (5.1%) since the 2018 census, and an increase of 24 people (5.8%) since the 2013 census. There were 228 males, 204 females, and 3 people of other genders in 162 dwellings. 2.1% of people identified as LGBTIQ+. There were 84 people (19.3%) aged under 15 years, 45 (10.3%) aged 15 to 29, 228 (52.4%) aged 30 to 64, and 78 (17.9%) aged 65 or older.

People could identify as more than one ethnicity. The results were 97.2% European (Pākehā), 5.5% Māori, 0.7% Asian, and 4.1% other, which includes people giving their ethnicity as "New Zealander". English was spoken by 96.6%, Māori by 1.4%, and other languages by 7.6%. No language could be spoken by 2.8% (e.g. too young to talk). The percentage of people born overseas was 13.8, compared with 28.8% nationally.

Religious affiliations were 31.0% Christian, 0.7% Buddhist, 0.7% New Age, and 2.1% other religions. People who answered that they had no religion were 58.6%, and 7.6% of people did not answer the census question.

Of those at least 15 years old, 99 (28.2%) people had a bachelor's or higher degree, 180 (51.3%) had a post-high school certificate or diploma, and 60 (17.1%) people exclusively held high school qualifications. 60 people (17.1%) earned over $100,000 compared to 12.1% nationally. The employment status of those at least 15 was 189 (53.8%) full-time, 75 (21.4%) part-time, and 9 (2.6%) unemployed.

== Climate ==
Climate data for Waihopai Power Station (1971–2000 normals, extremes 1962–1987)
Month	Jan	Feb	Mar	Apr	May	Jun	Jul	Aug	Sep	Oct	Nov	Dec	Year
Record high °C (°F)	35.0 (95.0)	38.5 (101.3)	31.7 (89.1)	28.1 (82.6)	22.4 (72.3)	21.4 (70.5)	19.1 (66.4)	20.3 (68.5)	26.5 (79.7)	29.0 (84.2)	29.5 (85.1)	35.0 (95.0)	38.5 (101.3)
Mean maximum °C (°F)	31.5 (88.7)	30.9 (87.6)	27.6 (81.7)	24.0 (75.2)	19.3 (66.7)	16.8 (62.2)	15.4 (59.7)	17.1 (62.8)	20.5 (68.9)	23.4 (74.1)	26.1 (79.0)	28.8 (83.8)	32.6 (90.7)
Mean daily maximum °C (°F)	23.7 (74.7)	23.6 (74.5)	21.1 (70.0)	17.8 (64.0)	14.4 (57.9)	11.5 (52.7)	11.0 (51.8)	12.4 (54.3)	14.7 (58.5)	17.1 (62.8)	19.0 (66.2)	21.5 (70.7)	17.3 (63.2)
Daily mean °C (°F)	17.4 (63.3)	17.3 (63.1)	15.2 (59.4)	12.2 (54.0)	9.2 (48.6)	6.6 (43.9)	6.0 (42.8)	7.1 (44.8)	9.4 (48.9)	11.6 (52.9)	13.5 (56.3)	15.6 (60.1)	11.8 (53.2)
Mean daily minimum °C (°F)	11.2 (52.2)	11.0 (51.8)	9.3 (48.7)	6.7 (44.1)	4.0 (39.2)	1.7 (35.1)	1.0 (33.8)	1.8 (35.2)	4.1 (39.4)	6.2 (43.2)	8.0 (46.4)	9.7 (49.5)	6.2 (43.2)
Mean minimum °C (°F)	5.0 (41.0)	5.3 (41.5)	3.4 (38.1)	1.3 (34.3)	−1.2 (29.8)	−2.7 (27.1)	−4.0 (24.8)	−2.9 (26.8)	−1.2 (29.8)	0.4 (32.7)	2.4 (36.3)	4.1 (39.4)	−4.6 (23.7)
Record low °C (°F)	2.5 (36.5)	1.3 (34.3)	0.3 (32.5)	−2.2 (28.0)	−4.2 (24.4)	−6.0 (21.2)	−8.2 (17.2)	−5.5 (22.1)	−6.7 (19.9)	−2.3 (27.9)	−1.0 (30.2)	−0.2 (31.6)	−8.2 (17.2)
Average rainfall mm (inches)	74.7 (2.94)	45.7 (1.80)	61.7 (2.43)	84.7 (3.33)	65.5 (2.58)	86.8 (3.42)	74.6 (2.94)	79.4 (3.13)	71.6 (2.82)	99.3 (3.91)	57.5 (2.26)	69.9 (2.75)	871.4 (34.31)
Source: NIWA
