= Te Awhi Rito New Zealand Reading Ambassador =

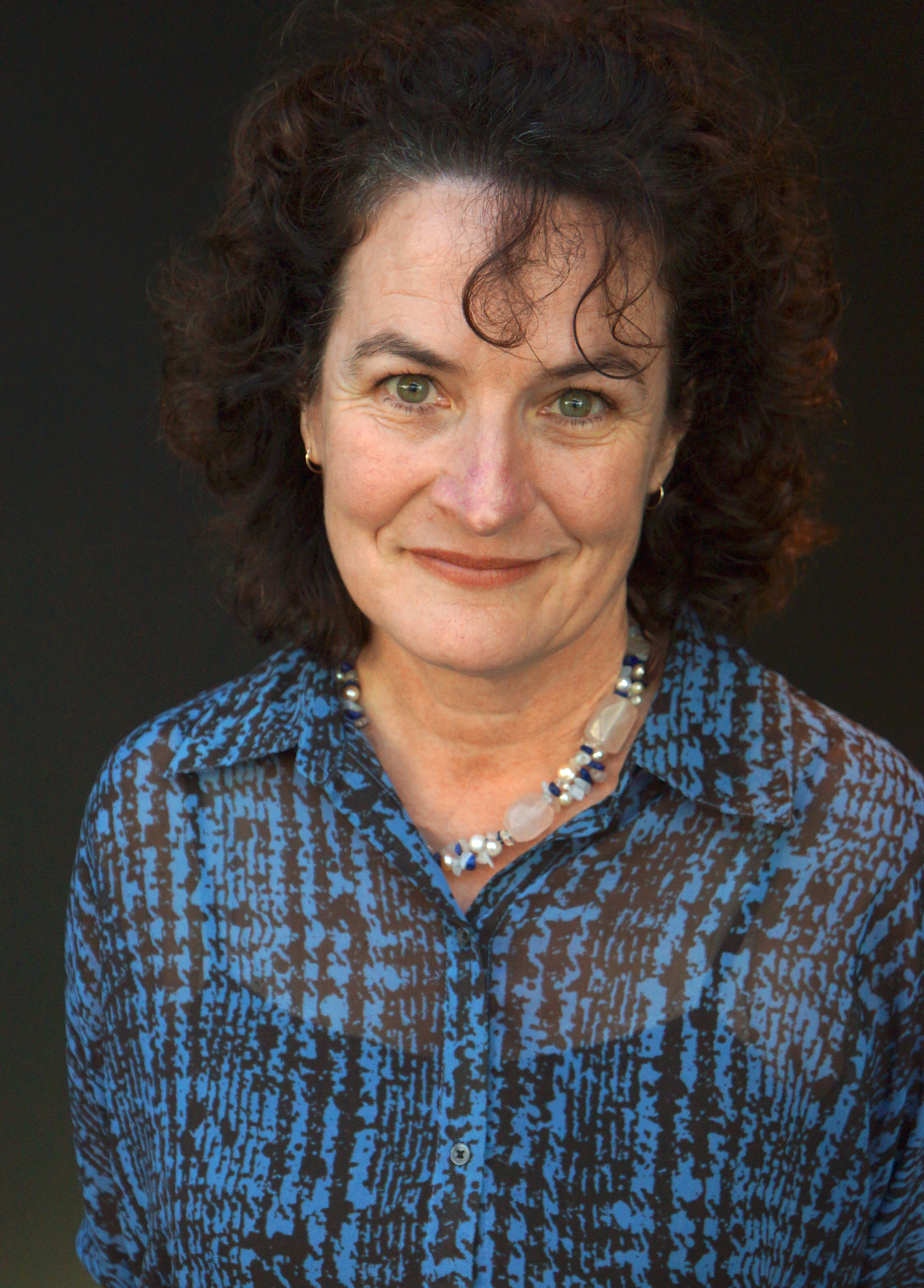
- Incumbent; Kate De Goldi since June 2025
- Appointer: National Library of New Zealand
- Term length: Two years
- Formation: 2021
- First holder: Ben Brown

Te Awhi Rito New Zealand Reading Ambassador is a role established with the purpose of promoting the power of reading to children and young people. The children's author and poet Ben Brown was named the first Reading Ambassador in 2021.

The role is led by the National Library of New Zealand, in partnership with Read NZ Te Pou Muramura, Creative New Zealand, and Storylines Children's Literature Charitable Trust.

== List of office holders ==
	Name	Term
1	Ben Brown	2021–2023
2	Alan Dingley	2023–2025
3	Kate De Goldi	2025–present

== See also ==
- Children's Laureate
- Australian Children's Laureate
