= Government Communications Security Bureau =

New Zealand signals intelligence agency

Coordinates: 41.2756572°S 174.7811653°E

- Te Tira Tiaki

Agency overview
- Formed: 1977; 49 years ago
- Jurisdiction: New Zealand Government
- Headquarters: Pipitea House, 1–15 Pipitea Street, Wellington
- Employees: 400 employees
- Annual budget: ▲NZ$212 million (2021–22)
- Minister responsible: Hon Paul Goldsmith, Minister Responsible for the GCSB
- Agency executive: Andrew Clark, Director-General
- Website: gcsb.govt.nz

The Government Communications Security Bureau (GCSB; Māori: Te Tira Tiaki) is the public-service department of New Zealand charged with promoting New Zealand's national security by collecting and analysing information of an intelligence nature. The GCSB is considered to be New Zealand's most powerful intelligence agency, and has been alleged to have conducted more espionage and data collection than the country's primary intelligence agency, the less funded NZSIS. This has at times proven controversial, although the GCSB does not have the baggage of criticism attached to it for a perceived failure to be effective like the NZSIS does. The GCSB is considered an equivalent of GCHQ in the United Kingdom or the NSA in the United States.

According to the Bureau's official website, it has a mission of contributing to the national security of New Zealand by providing information assurance and cybersecurity, foreign intelligence, and assistance to other New Zealand government agencies.

== History ==
The Government Communications Security Bureau was created in 1977 on the instructions of Robert Muldoon, the prime minister.

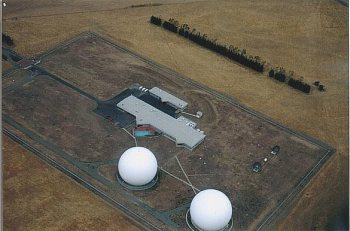
Waihopai Valley base

Prior to this, the functions now handled by the GCSB were split between three organisations:

- Communications security was the responsibility of the Communications Security Committee, based around the prime minister's office and the Ministry of Foreign Affairs.
- Signals intelligence was the responsibility of the Combined Signals Organisation, run by the military.
- Anti-bugging measures were the responsibility of the Security Intelligence Service.

Upon its establishment, the GCSB assumed responsibility for these three roles. Officially, the new organisation was part of the Ministry of Defence, and its functions and activities were highly secret – even Cabinet was not informed. In the 1980s, however, information was gradually released, first about the GCSB's security role, and then about its signals intelligence operations.

Also in the 1980s, the GCSB was split away from the Ministry of Defence, becoming a separate organisation. It was not until 2000, however, that it was decided to make the GCSB a government department in its own right. This decision was implemented through the Government Communications Security Bureau Act 2003.

In 2001, the Centre for Critical Infrastructure Protection was formed within the GCSB with a mandate to assist in the protection of national critical infrastructure from information-borne threats. The National Cyber Security Centre was established within the GCSB in September 2011, and it absorbed the functions of the Centre for Critical Infrastructure Protection.

== Staff and budget ==
The GCSB is considered to be a government department in its own right with its head office in Pipitea St, Wellington. Through its director, the GCSB reports to the Minister Responsible for the GCSB. Judith Collins held this portfolio until 7 April 2026, when Christopher Penk was appointed to it. Its main functions are: the collection and processing of intelligence, the distribution of intelligence, IT security, technology and administration. It has slightly over 400 employees with a range of disciplines including foreign language experts, communications and cryptography specialists, engineers, technicians and support staff.

In 2015/16 the budget for the GCSB was $89.6 million. Former Green MP Keith Locke says that despite the attention the GCSB received as a result of its illegal surveillance of Kim Dotcom, there has been little public discussion about its value. Locke questions GCSB's suitability for the task of protecting government computers given its security failures. Cabinet Secretary Rebecca Kitteridge's report noted the Bureau's problems included "under-resourcing and a lack of legal staff".

== Oversight ==
An inspector-general has oversight of the GCSB (and other intelligence organisations). Brendan Horsley took up the post of inspector-general on 8 June 2020. Inspectors-general serve a five-year term, which may be renewed once for up to three further years. The office of the inspector-general also consists of Deputy Inspector-General Graeme Speden, and a number of investigating staff. A statutory advisory panel of two members also provides advice to the inspector-general.

The prime minister appoints both the director of the GCSB and the inspector general.

== Operations ==
The functions of the GCSB include signals intelligence, communications security, anti-bugging measures, and computer security. The GCSB does not publicly disclose the nature of the communications which it intercepts. It is frequently described by some authors, such as Nicky Hager, as part of ECHELON. In 2006, after the death of former Prime Minister David Lange, a 1985–86 report given to Lange was found among his papers, having been mistakenly released. The report listed a number of countries as targets of GCSB efforts, including Japan, the Philippines, Argentina, France, Vietnam, and many small Pacific island states. It also mentioned United Nations diplomatic traffic. In his book on the GCSB, Nicky Hager says that during the Cold War, the locations and activities of Soviet ships (including civilian craft such as fishing trawlers) were a major focus of the organisation's activities.

For the purposes of its signals intelligence activities, the GCSB maintains two "listening stations": a satellite communications interception station at GCSB Waihopai near Blenheim and a radio communications interception station at GCSB Tangimoana near Palmerston North. On 16 March 2015, the former National Security Agency contractor and whistleblower Edward Snowden disclosed that New Zealand's GCSB agency had a secret listening post, codenamed "Caprica", at the New Zealand High Commission in Honiara, the capital of the Solomon Islands. The "Caprica" outpost was reportedly modeled after the American National Security Agency's Stateroom outposts at selected United States Embassies across the world.

The GCSB is characterised by its focus on foreign intelligence gathering and is unable to collect intelligence on New Zealand citizens. Because of this, the agency is reliant on the New Zealand Security Intelligence Service for domestic intelligence gathering. If the GCSB were to collect data on New Zealanders, this would be in violation of the GCSB Amendment Bill.

=== GCSB strategic plan; 2016–2020 ===
The 2016 - 2020 strategic plan entails what the GCSB is aiming to achieve in the years until 2020. Its two main focuses are; "impenetrable infrastructure" and "indispensable intelligence." "New Zealand's most important information infrastructures are impenetrable to technology-borne compromise. We call this aim impenetrable infrastructure, and New Zealand's intelligence generates unique policy and operational impacts for New Zealand. We call this aim indispensable intelligence." They plan to do this through the set up of eight priority objectives, including recruiting and retaining the best employees, replacing high grade infrastructure and continuing to modernise the GCSB's access and tradecraft.

=== Waihopai station ===
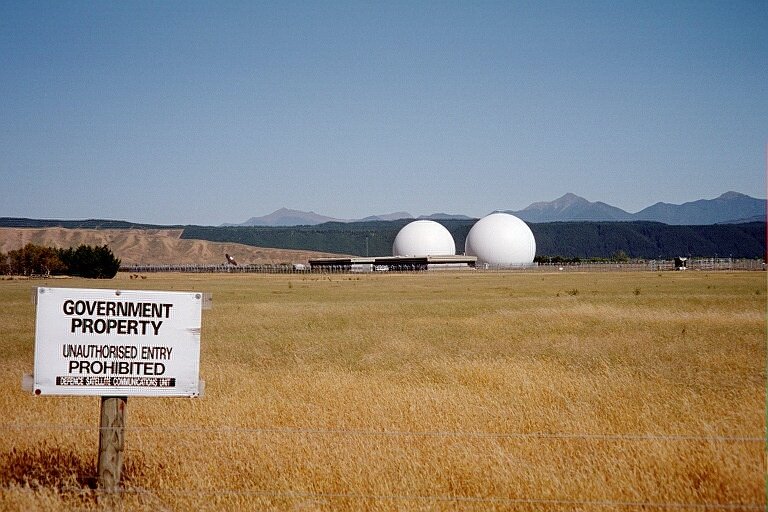
The Waihopai facility

The Waihopai Station has been operating since 1989. It is described as a satellite communications monitoring facility in the Waihopai Valley, near Blenheim. The facility has been identified by MP Keith Locke as part of ECHELON. Few details of the facility are known, but it is believed that it intercepts and processes all phone calls, faxes, e-mails and computer data communications. The site is a regular target for protesters and activists who are attempting to have the base closed down. The Anti-Bases Campaign have had regular yearly protests at the base.

In October 2021, the GCSB announced that Waihopai Station's two dishes and radomes would be decommissioned as the technology is obsolete. However, other data collection and information gathering will continue at the station.

=== Tangimoana station ===
The Tangimoana Station was opened in 1982, replacing an earlier facility at Irirangi, near Waiouru. According to the Federation of American Scientists (FAS), the facility is part of ECHELON; its role in this capacity was first identified publicly by peace researcher Owen Wilkes in 1984, and investigated in detail by peace activist and independent journalist Nicky Hager.

== Notable activities and controversies ==
=== Appointment of Ian Fletcher ===
Ian Fletcher was appointed as director of the GCSB in February 2012. Fletcher is a former diplomat who was interviewed by the appointment panel after an earlier short-list of four candidates had been rejected by the prime minister on the recommendation of the State Services Commissioner. In March 2013, John Key admitted he had known Fletcher since they were in school, but denied they were friends.

Answering questions in parliament about Mr Fletcher's appointment, Key said he hadn't "seen the guy in a long time" and hadn't mentioned he had made a phone call to Mr Fletcher when the question first came up in parliament because he had "forgotten" about it. Former GCSB director Sir Bruce Ferguson said the way Key had intervened in the selection process was "disturbing". The Labour Party called for an inquiry into the matter.

=== Illegal spying ===
Shortly before Fletcher was appointed, the GCSB was found to have illegally spied on Kim Dotcom, a German national but New Zealand resident. By law, the agency cannot spy on New Zealand residents. The GCSB admitted that Hugh Wolfensohn, acting director at the time, knew the organisation was spying on Dotcom. It is believed Mr Wolfensohn was placed on "gardening leave" after it became clear the GCSB had made a mistake in spying on Dotcom. In December, the High Court of New Zealand ruled Kim Dotcom could sue the GCSB for damages. The attorney-general appealed the ruling but was unsuccessful. In March 2013, The New Zealand Herald reported that Wolfensohn "no longer works for the GCSB intelligence agency as it braces for fresh exposure of its failings".

=== Kitteridge report ===
As a result of the Dotcom saga, a review of the bureau's compliance with legislation and its internal systems and processes was conducted by Cabinet Secretary Rebecca Kitteridge. In April 2013, Kitteridge's report was leaked to the media. It contradicted GCSB head Ian Fletcher's comments that the bureau had not unlawfully spied on anyone other than Dotcom showing that the GCSB may have unlawfully spied on up to 85 people between April 2003 and September 2012.

Fairfax reported "The review noted a series of failings had led to the illegal spying, including under-resourcing and a lack of legal staff." It found "the GCSB structure was overly complex and top heavy, while staff who performed poorly were tolerated, rather than dismissed or disciplined, so they would not pose a security risk upon leaving the bureau." The Green Party asked police to investigate the illegal spying.

Kitteridge also said she had trouble accessing a number of "basic files". Prime Minister John Key said there was no "cover-up", and the files were probably either misfiled or never existed in the first place.

=== GCSB Amendment Bill ===
On 8 May 2013, the National prime minister John Key introduced the Government Communications Security Bureau and Related Legislation Amendment Bill, which would extend the powers of the GCSB to enable it to collect information from all New Zealanders for the use of other government departments including the New Zealand Police, Defence Force and the Security Intelligence Service. Under the bill, the GCSB will have three main functions. Firstly, it will continue to collect foreign intelligence but it will not be allowed to spy on New Zealanders. Secondly, it will give the GCSB a legal mandate to assist the police, Defence Force and the Security Intelligence Service. Thirdly, it will extend the GCSB's cyber-security functions to encompass protecting private-sector cyber systems.

While this bill was supported by the ruling National Party and its coalition partners ACT New Zealand and the United Future MP Peter Dunne, it was opposed by the opposition Labour and the Green parties, several left-wing groups, and the internet millionaire Kim Dotcom, the NZ Law Society, and the Human Rights Tribunal. On 27 July, opponents of the GCSB Amendment Bill staged nationwide protests in eleven major towns and cities, and thousands attended. Critics of the GCSB Amendment Bill claimed that the Bill would turn New Zealand into a police state like the former German Democratic Republic and made references to George Orwell's novel 1984 and the ongoing Edward Snowden NSA Leaks scandal. In response, Prime Minister Key acknowledged that the protests were part of a "healthy democracy" with people being "allowed" to make their voices heard for the moment.

On 14 August 2013, the Prime Minister of New Zealand John Key addressed what he identified as "misinformation" surrounding the GCSB Amendment Bill, claiming that the actions of the Government Communications Security Bureau were analogous to Norton AntiVirus. On 21 August, the House of Representatives voted to pass the GCSB Amendment Bill by 61 to 59. The bill passed its third reading despite protests from the opposition parties, human rights groups, legal advocates, and technology groups. John Key defended the GCSB Amendment Bill by arguing that it did not authorise "wholesale spying" on New Zealanders and that its opponents were misinformed.

=== Southern Cross Cable mass surveillance ===
In 2013 the New Zealand Herald reported that the owners of the Southern Cross Cable, New Zealand's majority (≈95%) international internet access point, had asked the United States National Security Agency (NSA) to pay them for mass surveillance of New Zealand internet activity through the cable. In May 2014, John Minto, vice-president of the New Zealand Mana Party, alleged that the NSA was carrying out mass surveillance on all meta-data and content that went out of New Zealand through the cable.

In August 2014, New Zealand Green Party co-leader Russel Norman stated that an interception point was being established on the Southern Cross Cable. Norman said that as the cable is the only point of telecommunications access from New Zealand, this would allow the Government to spy on all phone calls and internet traffic from New Zealand. Norman's claims followed the revelation that an engineer from the NSA had visited New Zealand earlier in the year to discuss how to intercept traffic on the Southern Cross cable. The office of National Party New Zealand prime minister John Key denied the claims, but admitted that they were negotiating a "cable access programme" with the NSA, while refusing to clarify what that was or why the NSA was involved.

=== 2015 Edward Snowden surveillance disclosures ===
On 5 March 2015, The Intercept website and The New Zealand Herald newspaper disclosed that the Government Communications Security Bureau had been spying on New Zealand's South Pacific neighbours including Tuvalu, Nauru, Kiribati, Samoa, Vanuatu, the Solomon Islands, Fiji, Tonga, and the French overseas departments of New Caledonia and French Polynesia. The Intercept provided documents supplied by the US whistleblower Edward Snowden, who had earlier released leaked documents relating to the surveillance activities of other Five Eyes partners including the United States, Australia, Canada and the United Kingdom. The Snowden documents show that information collected by the GCSB is sent to the American National Security Agency to plug holes in the global intelligence network. Most of the surveillance was carried out from the GCSB's Waihopai Station in the South Island. Under the premiership of Prime Minister John Key, the GCSB had expanded its intelligence-gathering activities in support of the Five Eyes.

According to investigative journalist and peace activist Nicky Hager, the GCSB had gone from selective targeting of South Pacific targets to collecting a wide breadth of email messages and telephone calls. He added that the spy agency had upgraded its Waihopai spy base in 2009 to collect both the content and meta-data of all communications, rather than specific individuals and agencies. According to leaked documents supplied by Snowden, the GCSB collected a wide trove of electronic information including emails, mobile and fixed line phone calls, and social media messages from various South Pacific countries. In addition, Snowden alleged that a GCSB officer had also worked with the Australian Signals Directorate to spy on the Indonesian cellphone company Telkomsel.

The GCSB's mass surveillance programme was criticised by opposition parties including the Green Party co-leader Russel Norman and the Labour Party leader Andrew Little, who told the press that New Zealand risked damaging its relationship with the South Pacific and that the GCSB's actions amounted to an invasion of people's privacy. In 2014, New Zealand secured a seat on the United Nations Security Council with the support of the entire Pacific region on the platform that "New Zealand stands up for small states." The Green Party also laid a complaint with the Inspector-General of Intelligence and Security, alleging that the GCSB had broken the law by spying on New Zealanders who were holidaying in the South Pacific. In response, Brian Fergurson, a former director of the GCSB, acknowledged that the spy agency did collect emails and other electronic communications but that it did not use material about New Zealanders captured inadvertently.

The Tongan prime minister ʻAkilisi Pohiva has denounced New Zealand's espionage activities as a "breach of trust." He also expressed concerns about similar surveillance activities carried out by China. The Samoan prime minister Tuilaepa Sa'ilele has by contrast dismissed allegations of New Zealand espionage against Samoa, commenting that "it would be far fetched to think that a spy agency in any country would waste their resources doing that kind of thing to Samoa." In response to these disclosures, Prime Minister John Key issued a statement on 5 March 2015 saying that he would "neither confirm nor deny" whether New Zealand's spy agencies were spying on the South Pacific. Key had earlier acknowledged that New Zealand was a member of the Five Eyes club, which included the United States, Britain, Canada, Australia, and New Zealand, during a speech calling for New Zealand to deploy troops to Iraq to combat the Islamic State of Iraq and the Levant.

On 11 March 2015, Edward Snowden disclosed that the Government Communications Security Bureau was also using the Waihopai Station to intercept transmissions from several Pacific Rim and Asian countries including Vietnam, China, India, Pakistan, and several unspecified South American nations. He added that the GCSB was helping the National Security Agency to fill gaps in its world surveillance data collection. In response to Snowden's disclosures, Una Jagose, the Acting-Director of the GCSB issued a statement that the spy agency was collecting less information than it was seven years ago during a session of the New Zealand Parliament's Intelligence and Security Committee. According to the GCSB's latest annual report, the volume of phone and electronic surveillance carried out on New Zealanders surged throughout 2014. On 13 March 2015, the Fijian military commander Brigadier-General Mosese Tikoitoga confirmed that the Fijian Military Forces were aware of the GCSB's intelligence-gathering activities in Fiji.

On 15 March 2015, the journalists Nicky Hager and Ryan Gallagher reported in the New Zealand Herald that the GCSB was using the NSA's internet mass surveillance system XKeyscore to intercept email communications from several leading Solomon Islands government ministers, the Solomons Islands Truth and Reconciliation Commission, and the Solomons anti-corruption campaigner Benjamin Afuga. In response, the New Zealand Minister of Foreign Affairs Murray McCully downplayed reports of the spying disclosures by asserting that Pacific Islands ministers "were smart enough not to believe what they read in New Zealand newspapers." He also offered to discuss their concerns about the mass surveillance programme in private. The Solomons Chief of Staff, Robert Iroga, has condemned the New Zealand Government's actions for damaging New Zealand's image as a "friendly government" in the South Pacific. He added that communications within the inner circle of the Solomons Government was "highly secret information" that rightfully belong to the Solomon Islanders.

On 16 March 2015, Snowden released more documents which revealed that the GCSB had a secret listening post, codenamed "Caprica", at the New Zealand High Commission in the Solomon Islands capital of Honiara. The "Caprica" outpost was reportedly modeled after the NSA's Stateroom outposts at selected United States Embassies across the world. On 22 March 2015, The Intercept released a new document which showed that the GCSB had monitored the email and internet communications of several foreign diplomats vying for the position of Director-General of the World Trade Organization. This surveillance was carried out on behalf of the New Zealand trade minister Tim Groser, who was also competing for that position. Known targets included candidates from Brazil, Costa Rica, Ghana, Jordan, Indonesia, Kenya, Mexico, and South Korea. Ultimately, Groser's candidature was unsuccessful and the Brazilian diplomat Roberto Azevêdo was elected as the Director General of the WTO in May 2013. In response to these disclosures, Sergio Danese, the Secretary-General of the Brazilian Ministry of External Relations summoned the New Zealand Ambassador Caroline Bilkey to explain the actions of her government.

On 26 March 2015, the Inspector-General of Intelligence and Security Cheryl Gywn announced that she would lead an inquiry into the allegations that the GCSB had spied on New Zealanders working in the Pacific. Prime Minister John Key has welcomed this inquiry. On 16 April 2015, The Intercept and New Zealand Herald disclosed that the GCSB had been both spying on and sharing intelligence with the Bangladesh government, using a leaked National Security Agency document entitled "NSA Intelligence Relationship with New Zealand." The Bangladeshi security forces have been implicated in various human rights abuses including extrajudicial killings and torture. The New Zealand Government has refused to respond to these disclosures but opposition parties have criticised the GCSB for cooperating with Bangladeshi security forces.

On 19 April 2015, The Intercept and the New Zealand Herald revealed that the GCSB and the National Security Agency had worked together to tap into a data link between the Chinese Consulate-General and the Chinese Visa Office in Auckland, New Zealand's largest city. According to a leaked secret report entitled "NSA activities in progress 2013", the GCSB was providing additional technical data on the data link to the NSA's "Tailored Accessed Operations", a powerful system that hacks into computer systems and networks to intercept communications. Other leaked documents also indicated that the GCSB codenamed their Auckland tapping operation "Frostbite" while their American counterparts called it "Basilhayden", after a Kentucky bourbon that was once regarded as the fictional spy James Bond's favourite alcoholic beverage. In response, a Chinese Embassy spokesman told the New Zealand Herald that China was concerned about the report and attached great importance to the cybersecurity issue.

On 5 May 2015, the Department of the Prime Minister and Cabinet acknowledged that Snowden's leaked documents on the GCSB and NSA were authentic but accused Snowden's associates, particularly the journalist Glenn Greenwald, of "misrepresenting, misinterpreting, and misunderstanding" the leaked information.

=== 2018–2019 Huawei ban ===
In late November 2018, the Government Communications Security Bureau prevented national telecommunications provider Spark New Zealand from using Chinese telecommunication giant Huawei's equipment in its 5G mobile tower expansion, with the agency's Director-General Andrew Hampton citing "a significant network security risk." New Zealand's decision to ban Huawei from its 5G expansion programme accompanied moves by several Western governments including the United States, United Kingdom, and Australia to exclude Huawei from participating in their 5G mobile network expansion programs as well as the ongoing China-United States trade war.

=== 2019 Christchurch mosque shootings ===
Following the Christchurch mosque shootings in March 2019, the GCSB assembled a 24-hour operation response team which worked with domestic agencies and foreign partners to support the New Zealand Police and its domestic intelligence counterpart, the New Zealand Security Intelligence Service. In December 2020, a Royal Commission of Inquiry into the mosque shootings criticised the GCSB and other security services and intelligence agencies for focusing on Islamic extremism at the expense of other threats including White supremacy.

In response to the Royal Commission, the GCSB's Director-General Andrew Hampton stated that the agency was committed to making its role and capabilities "more widely understood and utilised by domestic partner agencies". Hampton also claimed that the GCSB did not distinguish between different forms of violent extremism "before and after" the Christchurch attacks and vowed to support national and global efforts against the "full spectrum of violent extremism."

=== 2021 Chinese cyber attacks ===
On 20 July 2021, the Minister in charge of GCSB Andrew Little confirmed that the spy agency had established links between Chinese state-sponsored actors known as "Advanced Persistent Threat 40" (APT40) and malicious cyber activity in New Zealand. In addition, Little confirmed that New Zealand was joining other Western governments including the United States, United Kingdom, Australia and the European Union in condemning the Chinese Ministry of State Security and other Chinese state-sponsored actors for their involvement in the 2021 Microsoft Exchange Server data breach. In response, the Chinese Embassy in New Zealand described the New Zealand Government's statement as "groundless and irresponsible" and lodged a "solemn representation" with the New Zealand Government. The Embassy claimed that China was a staunch defender of cybersecurity and firmly opposed all forms of cyber attacks and crimes.

On 21 July, Foreign Minister Nanaia Mahuta confirmed that New Zealand Foreign Ministry officials had met with Chinese Embassy officials at the request of the Chinese Embassy in response to the cyber attack allegations. The Embassy urged the New Zealand Government to abandon its so-called "Cold War mentality." New Zealand exporters have expressed concerns that an escalation of diplomatic tensions could affect Sino-New Zealand trade.

In late March 2024 the GCSB's Director-General Andrew Clark confirmed that the Chinese-sponsored hacker group APT40 had attempted to breach the New Zealand Parliamentary Service and the Parliamentary Council Office's computer systems in 2021. In response, GCSB Minister Judith Collins, Prime Minister Christopher Luxon and Foreign Minister Winston Peters issued statements criticising the attempted cyber attacks. In response, a Chinese Embassy spokesperson dismissed the complaint as "groundless and irresponsible accusations" and confirmed it would lodge a complaint with New Zealand officials. Reports of the data hack accompanied reports that the United States, British and Australian governments had sanctioned APT40 for similar activities in their countries.

=== Counterterrorism ===
On 27 March 2023, Director-General Andrew Hampton confirmed during a meeting of Parliament's Intelligence and Security Committee that the GCSB in cooperation with other agencies had foiled three potential terror attacks. These incidents included a person making bomb threats in 2022 with "an implied ideological motivation", a New Zealand White identity adherent's concerning online behaviour, and another White identity extremist making threats to use firearms and explosives at a public event.

=== Hosting of foreign agency intelligence capabilities ===
On 21 March 2024, the inspector-general released a report detailing how the GCSB hosted a foreign agency's signal intelligence capability that could be used to support "military operations by foreign partners" during the years 2013 to 2020, without advising any government ministers. The report found fault with the initial process of agreeing to host the capability, as well as a lack of operational oversight during the period of its operation. Former prime minister – and former minister for the GCSB in the years 2003 to 2008 – Helen Clark, suggested that disciplinary action would be appropriate for GCSB staff that signed off on the capability

== Directors ==
The GCSB is administered by a Director. The directors have been:

- Group Captain Colin Hanson OBE (1977–1988)
- Group Captain Ray Parker ONZM (1988–1999)
- Dr Warren Tucker (1999–2006)
- Air Marshal Sir Bruce Ferguson KNZM OBE AFC (2006–2010)
- Simon Murdoch CNZM (acting November 2010 – February 2011)
- Lieutenant General Sir Jerry Mateparae GNZM QSO (7 February – 30 June 2011)
- Simon Murdoch CNZM (acting 1 July – 19 December 2011)
- Ian Fletcher (29 January 2012 – 27 February 2015)
- Una Jagose (acting 28 February 2015 – February 2016)
- Lisa Fong (acting February–April 2016)
- Andrew Hampton (May 2016 – April 2023)
- Andrew Clark (October 2023 – present)

Jerry Mateparae was appointed by Prime Minister John Key on 26 August 2010 taking up the role on 7 February 2011. On 8 March 2011 Mateparae was announced as the next Governor-General. He continued as Director until June 2011.

Ian Fletcher (who had been appointed for five years) unexpectedly announced his resignation for family reasons in January 2015, with an acting director to take over at the end of the month.

== See also ==
- New Zealand intelligence agencies
- New Zealand Security Intelligence Service
- Anti-Bases Campaign
