= Kate De Goldi =

New Zealand writer (born 1959)

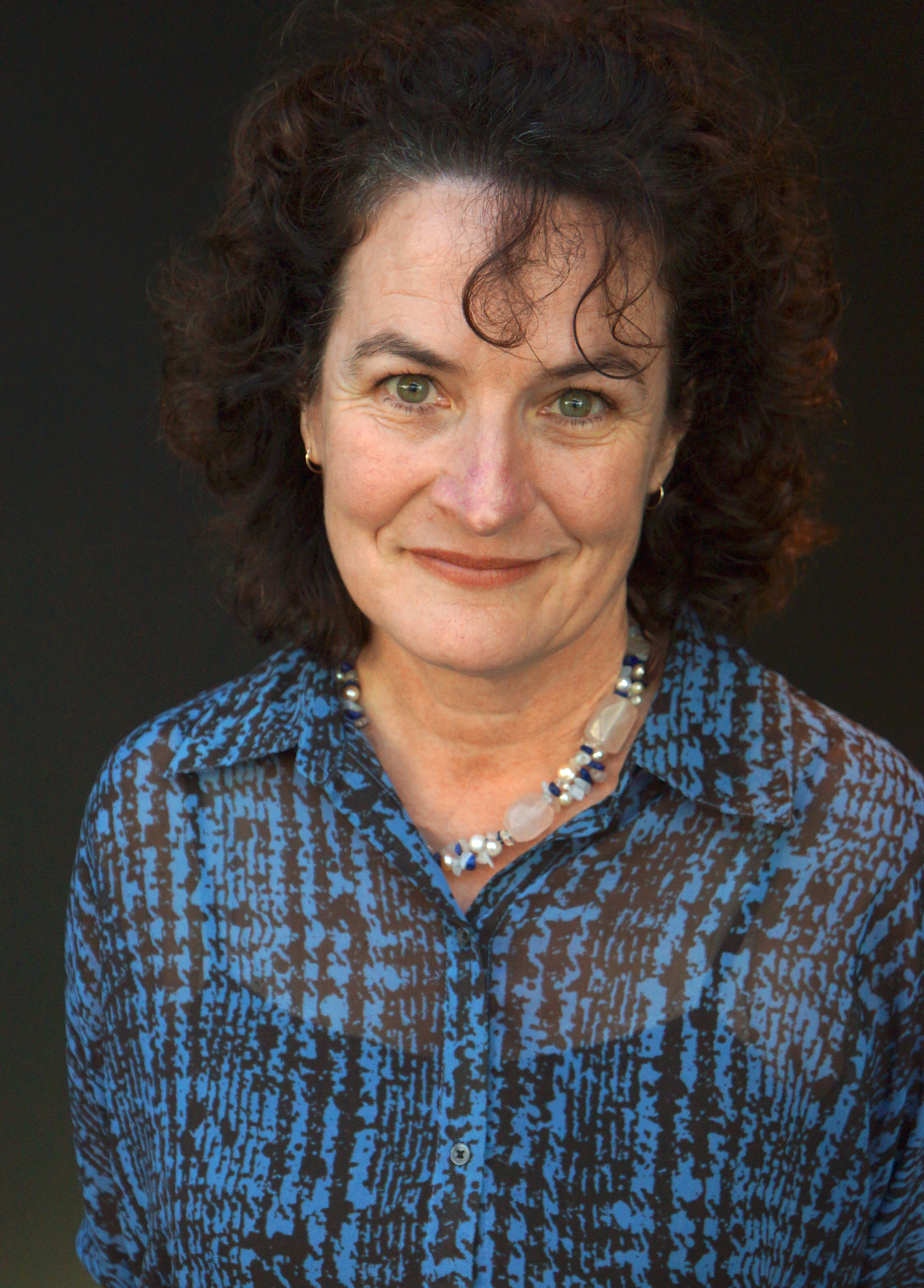
- De Goldi at the 2012 Frankfurt Book Fair
- Born: Kathleen Domenica De Goldi; 1959 (age 66–67); Christchurch, New Zealand
- Occupation: Writer
- Partner: Bruce Foster
- Writing career
- Pen name: Kate Flannery
- Website: www.katedegoldi.org

Kathleen Domenica De Goldi (born 1959) is a New Zealand novelist, children's writer and short story writer. Her early work was published under the pseudonym Kate Flannery. In 2025, she was appointed as the New Zealand Reading Ambassador (Te Awhi Rito).

== Early life ==
De Goldi was born in Christchurch in 1959. She is of mixed Irish and Italian ancestry.

== Career ==
De Goldi published her first collection of short stories like you, really (1994) under the pseudonym Kate Flannery.

De Goldi has been a full-time writer since 1997, and contributes to the New Zealand literature sector as a creative writing teacher (1999-2006 at the IIML), a book-related broadcaster and radio commentator, a participant of Writers in Schools, and a chair for literary festivals in New Zealand and internationally. De Goldi is an Arts Foundation Laureate (named in 2001).

De Goldi received the 2010 Michael King Fellowship to research and write an article about Susan Price. De Goldi has received both the 2011 Margaret Mahy Award and the 2011 Young Readers' Award Corine Literature Prize, She is known for children's literature and has also won awards for her short story writing, including the Katherine Mansfield Memorial Award in 1999.

In 2025 she was announced as the third New Zealand Reading Ambassador. She will serve in the role until 2027.

== Selected works ==
=== Novels ===
- 1996 – Sanctuary, ISBN 9780140259452
- 1997 – Love, Charlie Mike, ISBN 9780140386004
- 1999 – Closed, Stranger, ISBN 9780143772040
- 2008 – The 10pm Question, ISBN 9780763649395
- 2012 – The ACB with Honora Lee, illustrated by Gregory O'Brien, ISBN 9781869799915
- 2015 – From the Cutting Room of Barney Kettle, ISBN 9781775535768
- 2022 – Eddy, Eddy, ISBN 9781988547152

=== Picture books ===
- 2005 - Clubs: A Lolly Leopold Story, illustrated by Jacqui Colley, ISBN 9781435255494
- 2005 - Uncle Jack, illustrated by Jacqui Colley, ISBN 9780473100643
- 2008 - A Lolly Leopold Story, illustrated by Jacqui Colley, ISBN 9781435255500

=== Editor with Susan Paris ===
- 2016 - Annual (Gecko Press) ISBN 9781776570775
- 2017 - Annual 2 (Annual Ink) ISBN 9780473395230
