= Director-General of the GCSB =

New Zealand intelligence post

Director-General of the Government Communications Security Bureau (GCSB)
- Incumbent; Andrew Clark since 30 October 2023; 2 years ago
- Government Communications Security Bureau
- Appointer: Prime Minister of New Zealand
- Term length: At His Majesty's pleasure
- Constituting instrument: on the instructions of the Prime Minister
- Inaugural holder: Group Captain Colin Hanson OBE (1977–1988)
- Formation: 1977; 49 years ago
- Website: www.gcsb.govt.nz/about-us/director-of-the-gcsb/

The Director-General of the GCSB is the leader of the Government Communications Security Bureau, commonly abbreviated as the GCSB. The organisation is considered the most powerful and influential of the New Zealand intelligence agencies, and has been headed by Andrew Clark since April 2023. The Director-General of the GCSB is appointed by the Prime Minister without the consultation of Parliament, and the Director makes reports directly to him or her.
