= Ben Brown (writer) =

New Zealand children's author (born 1962)

Benjamin Brown (born 3 July 1962) is a New Zealand children's author and poet, and was the New Zealand Reading Ambassador (Te Awhi Rito) for 2021–2023.

== Biography ==
Brown was born in Motueka, New Zealand, on 3 July 1962.

He started writing books for children in 1992. His book A Booming in the Night won the Best Picture Book Award at the 2006 New Zealand Post Book Awards for Children and Young Adults. Brown held a Michael King Writers' Centre Māori Writer's Residency in 2011 during which he wrote the poetry collection Between the Kindling and the Blaze: Reflections on the Concept of Mana.

He lives in Lyttelton, New Zealand. In 2021 he was announced as the first New Zealand Reading Ambassador. Brown's term ended in May 2023. Brown was succeeded by Alan Dingley.
