= Waiouru =

Town in Manawatū-Whanganui, New Zealand

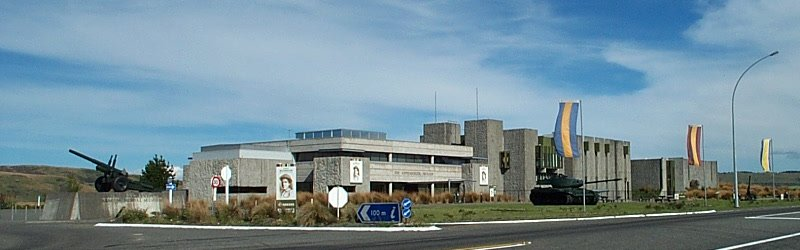
- The National Army Museum in Waiouru
- Interactive map of Waiouru
- Coordinates: 39°29′S 175°40′E
- Country: New Zealand
- Region: Manawatū-Whanganui
- District: Ruapehu District
- Ward: Ruapehu General Ward; Ruapehu Māori Ward
- Community: Waimarino-Waiouru Community
- Electorates: Whanganui; Te Tai Hauāuru (Māori)

Government
  - Territorial Authority: Ruapehu District Council
  - Regional council: Horizons Regional Council
  - Mayor of Ruapehu: Weston Kirton
  - Whanganui MP: Carl Bates
  - Te Tai Hauāuru MP: Debbie Ngarewa-Packer

Area
  - Total: 5.01 km^{2} (1.93 sq mi)
- Elevation: 792 m (2,598 ft)

Population (June 2025)
  - Total: 850
  - Density: 170/km^{2} (440/sq mi)
- Time zone: UTC+12 (NZST)
  - Summer (DST): UTC+13 (NZDT)
- Postcode: 4825, 4826
- Area code: 06

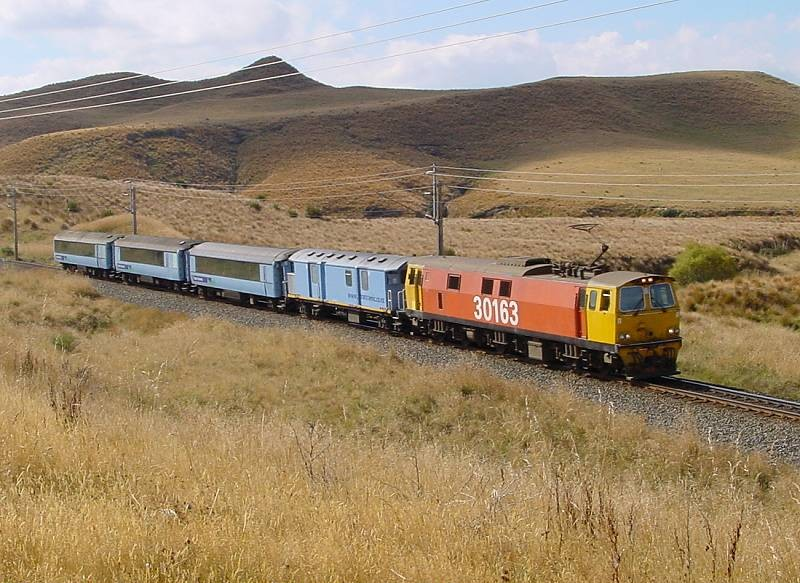
The Overlander, hauled by EF 30163 near Waiouru

Waiouru is a small town in the Ruapehu District, in New Zealand's Manawatū-Whanganui region. It is located on the south-eastern North Island Volcanic Plateau, 130 km (81 mi) north of Palmerston North and 25 kilometres south-east of Mount Ruapehu. The town had a population of 861 in the 2023 census.

The main attraction of Waiouru is the National Army Museum, opened in 1978, which features static displays of New Zealand's military heritage. The rest of the township consists of a small cluster of a police station, two garages, a petrol station/postal agency, a panel beater, two motels, a tavern and half a dozen cafe/restaurants spread along the highway. There are three unmanned diesel refueling sites for the 700+ large freight trucks that pass through Waiouru each day. Nearby are the yards of a roading contractor and a maintenance contractor. A grocery store, hairdresser and beautician are in the Army housing area two kilometres away, and a medical centre, public library, cafe and department store are inside the army camp.

Waiouru is a military town that has grown up in conjunction with the New Zealand Army Camp and the Training Group (ATG), which is responsible for the training of recruits and other soldiers. The Desert Road immediately north of Waiouru runs through the 870 km^{2} army training area, which lies mainly to the east of the road. The Royal NZ Navy's Irirangi communications station is 2 km north of Waiouru, identifiable by its large antennae.

North of Waiouru is the section of State Highway 1 called the Desert Road. This runs for 50 km through the Rangipo Desert to Tūrangi, at the southern end of Lake Taupō. Waiouru is on the North Island Main Trunk railway, which came through in 1907. Waiouru Railway Station is the highest station (814 m) on the New Zealand rail system. The Northern Explorer does not stop at Waiouru, but its predecessor the Overlander did until April 2005.

Seven kilometres to the west of Waiouru is the small settlement of Tangiwai, the site of New Zealand's worst railway disaster. On 24 December 1953 the overnight express from Wellington to Auckland passed over Tangiwai railway bridge just after it had been weakened by a lahar from Mount Ruapehu. The bridge collapsed, sending the train into the Whangaehu River, killing 151 people. Many army and naval personnel were involved in the rescue of survivors and the recovery of bodies. Sister Mortimer of the Waiouru Camp Hospital, "The Angel of Tangiwai", worked non-stop for three days tending the survivors and laying out the bodies.

== History ==
Merino sheep were brought from Taupō in 1855 by missionary Tom Grace, to graze on the tussock lands in the Waiouru area. The flock was eaten by Te Kooti's warriors in 1869, and 4,000 more merinos were brought over the mountains from Hawke's Bay.

In England, the development of steam-powered machinery for making woolen cloth caused the price paid for raw wool to rise to £150 per ton, (about NZ$60 a kilo at today's values). Waiouru's placement within the Murimotu plains provided access to more than 60,000 hectares of tussock grassland, enough to graze 60,000 sheep. This boom provided wool production of approximately 240 tons, worth £36,000 (with the buying power of NZ$14 million today).

In 1871 the government sought to lease these tussock plains. It offered the Maori land-owners an annual rent of £3500, worth NZ$1.4 million today. In order to fulfill the rental agreement, all of the land-owning groups had to agree to its terms. This caused considerable delays, as parts of the Murimotu plains had been used to gather wild-fowl by the surrounding land-owners, Ngati Rangi (Karioi/Whanganui river) Te Ati Hau/Tūwharetoa (Taumarunui/Lake Taupō), and Ngati Whiti (Moawhango).

As of 1850, boundaries were settled between neighboring land-owners at a large hui chaired by Wanganui missionary Richard Taylor, with most of the Murimotu land being allotted to various hapu of Ngati Rangi. Finances were not considered at the time and in the proceeding 20 years the Hauhau, Titokowaru, and Te Kooti wars had been fought, creating new power groups and enmities, especially between the coastal Whanganui guerilla leader Major Kemp/Te Keepa and his upper river rival, Major Topia Turoa. Consequently numerous conflicting claims were put forward and progress for an agreement was therefore hindered.

In 1876, after five years of Land Court hearings at Wanganui, an agreement was yet to be met. By 1877, one hundred and six claimant owners had signed the lease agreement, but the land had not been surveyed, as others still refused to sign.

=== Studholme's land grab ===
As discourse continued, John Studholme, described by the Wanganui Herald as a "Canterbury land shark", had already been grazing the land around Waiouru for three years. Backed by the Auckland capitalists Moorhouse, Morrin, and Russell, Studholme had made a highly illegal deal in 1874, leasing the land for 21 years from Topia Turoa, who claimed ownership of all the land between Rangipo and Karioi through his marriage of Makarena Utaora of Ngati Rangi.

In March 1874, Studholme's men had moved cattle and sheep onto the land and started building houses, stables, and sheds at Karioi, as well as a shepherds' huts at Waiouru.

In January 1880 the Studholme land ring attempted to obtain permanent ownership of the land from Topia and sent surveyors to mark the exact boundaries. This incensed the Ngati Rangi faction and in response they called on Major Kemp for assistance. Major Kemp re-activated his company of seasoned gun-fighters, with whom he had routed the Hauhau at the Battle of Moutua Island 16 years previously. Major Kemp and his men rode from the Whanganui river valley to Waiouru, and then on another 10 km east to the strategic high ground of Auahitotara, where they began some sabre-rattling live-firing practice. This upset the Ngati Whiti people at Moawhango village 15 km to the east, who re-activated their own gun-fighters as well. The Moawhango militia moved forward to two shepherds' huts at Te Waiu and dug defensive trenches surrounding the site. These trenches, known as the Waiu Pa site, can still be seen today.

A Maori missionary defused the situation before any bloodshed occurred, and in 1884 the Land Court finally awarded ownership of each block of the now-surveyed Murimotu land to various hapu of Ngati Rangi, although Studholme's political connections in Wellington allowed him to keep his lease for its remaining 11 years.

It was a hollow victory for Studholme; although his costs remained high, the price paid for wool plummeted as vast new sheep farms in Australia came into production. Coupled with this, the extremely cold winter of 1893 created deep snow from late March to October and left 20,000 of his sheep dead, and the remainder emaciated.

By the mid-1890s there were only 40,000 merinos on the tussock lands between Karioi bush and the Kaimanawa Ranges.

=== Infrastructure development ===
Pack-tracks had been formed in the 1870s, after traces of gold were discovered in 1869, 30 km north-east of Waiouru on Mr. Lyon's run at Kereru. The Gentle Annie track was used to get the hundreds of tons of Murimotu wool to Napier and later the shorter, but muddier, routes of Hales' Track and Field's Track to Wanganui were built. These tracks were later developed into roads for wool wagons and stage-coaches. By 1897 there was a coaching house at Waiouru for mail-coach passengers on the Napier-Taupō run.

About 1904, Alfred Peters set up a post office, store and an accommodation house for travelers at Waiouru and for the 500 men who were digging the large railway cuttings 1 km west of Waiouru. (Archer 2009) In 2007, Alfred Peters' descendants were still farming a short distance east of Waiouru 100 years later.

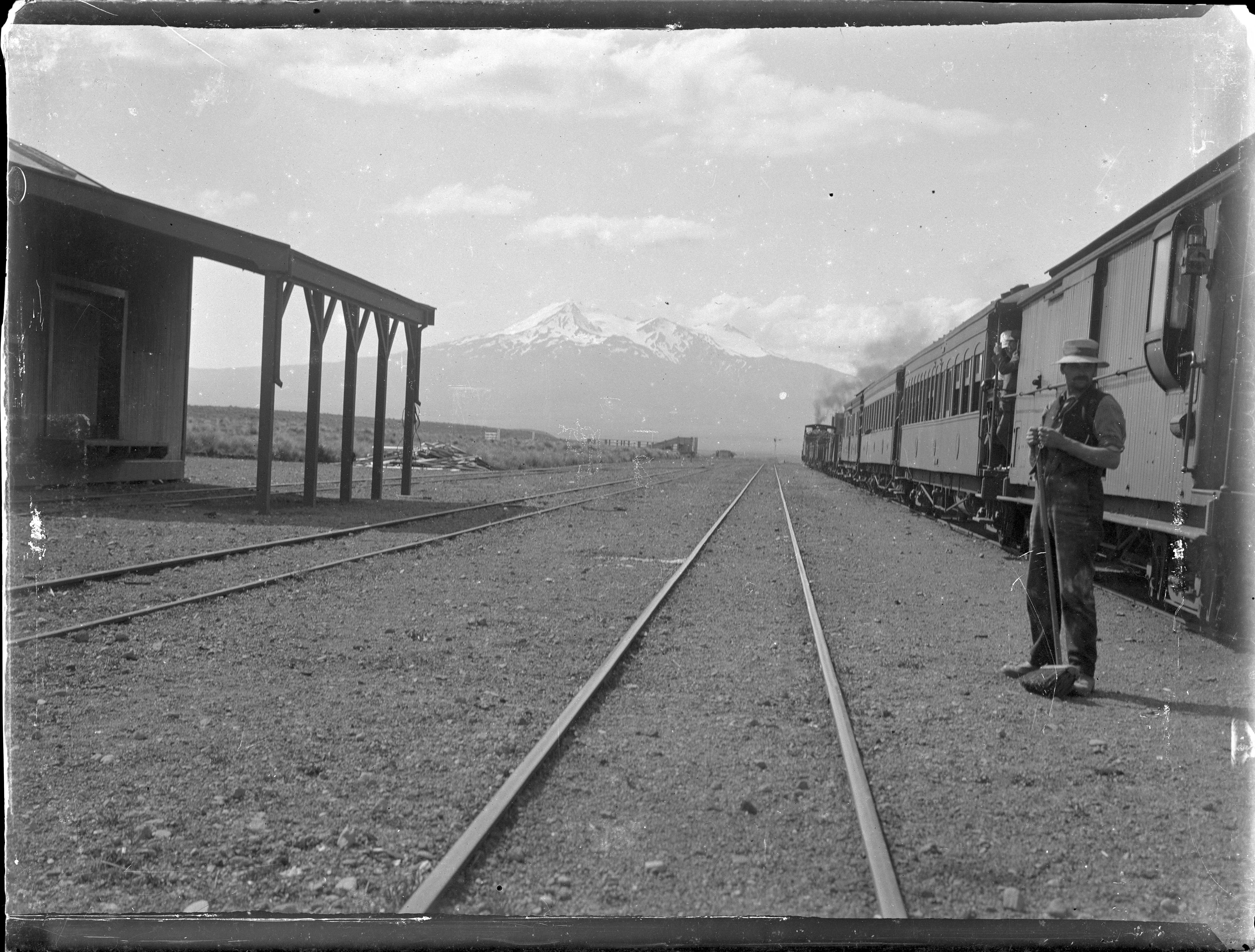
Train at Waiouru Railway Station circa 1930s

The North Island Main Trunk railway arrived in 1907, when the Waiouru railway station was opened; the station closed to goods in 1986, and to passengers in 2005 when the Overlander no longer stopped there.

By 1907 little wool was being sent out, as overgrazing by sheep had led to a plague of rabbits. By the 1930's, grazing was exhausted on Waiouru sheep station and in 1939 most of the leasehold Waiouru sheep station land was taken by the Government for the Army Camp.

Wally Harding began farming and developing the Waiouru sheep station in 1939, cultivating the tussock land with giant discs pulled by a crawler tractor, and then oversowing with swedes. In 1951 Harding began aerial topdressing his farm with a war-surplus Tiger Moth. (Moss 1956) This project expanded into Wanganui Aero Work Ltd. Hardings's grandson Lockie still farms at Waiouru as of 2014.

In 1978, the QEII Army Memorial Museum, now named the National Army Museum, was opened. Its buildings were designed by Sir Miles Warren and it was built alongside State Highway 1 by engineers of the New Zealand Army. It has since been expanded with additions constructed in 1983 and 1995.

== Demographics ==
Stats NZ describes Waiouru as a rural settlement, which covers 5.01 km^{2} (1.93 sq mi). It had an estimated population of 850 as of June 2025, with a population density of 170 people per km^{2}.

Historical population
Year	Pop.	±% p.a.
2006	1,362	—
2013	741	−8.33%
2018	765	+0.64%
2023	861	+2.39%

Waiōuru had a population of 861 in the 2023 New Zealand census, an increase of 96 people (12.5%) since the 2018 census, and an increase of 120 people (16.2%) since the 2013 census. There were 489 males, 369 females, and 3 people of other genders in 246 dwellings. 3.5% of people identified as LGBTIQ+. The median age was 27.2 years (compared with 38.1 years nationally). There were 216 people (25.1%) aged under 15 years, 261 (30.3%) aged 15 to 29, 339 (39.4%) aged 30 to 64, and 48 (5.6%) aged 65 or older.

People could identify as more than one ethnicity. The results were 69.3% European (Pākehā); 44.9% Māori; 10.5% Pasifika; 5.9% Asian; 1.4% Middle Eastern, Latin American and African New Zealanders (MELAA); and 1.4% other, which includes people giving their ethnicity as "New Zealander". English was spoken by 96.5%, Māori by 11.1%, Samoan by 1.0%, and other languages by 7.7%. No language could be spoken by 2.4% (e.g. too young to talk). New Zealand Sign Language was known by 0.7%. The percentage of people born overseas was 13.6, compared with 28.8% nationally.

Religious affiliations were 24.4% Christian, 0.3% Hindu, 0.3% Islam, 2.4% Māori religious beliefs, 0.3% Buddhist, 1.0% New Age, 0.3% Jewish, and 1.4% other religions. People who answered that they had no religion were 59.6%, and 9.1% of people did not answer the census question.

Of those at least 15 years old, 75 (11.6%) people had a bachelor's or higher degree, 450 (69.8%) had a post-high school certificate or diploma, and 117 (18.1%) people exclusively held high school qualifications. The median income was $50,800, compared with $41,500 nationally. 33 people (5.1%) earned over $100,000 compared to 12.1% nationally. The employment status of those at least 15 was 483 (74.9%) full-time, 48 (7.4%) part-time, and 18 (2.8%) unemployed.

== Waiouru Military Camp ==
From 1936 to 1938, Territorial artillery batteries camped under canvas at Waiouru for their summer training exercises. In 1939, a month after war was declared, most of the leasehold Waiouru run was taken back by the Crown. By December 1940 a large training camp had been built, and 340 km^{2} of land acquired for training.

From 1949 another 250 km^{2} of land to the north and east was acquired for training, and for upgrading of the State Highway and constructing a high-voltage power line up the Moawhango valley. The base expanded for compulsory National Service and for NZSAS training. At its peak in the 1970s, Waiouru had a population of 6,000 people, including 600+ school aged children.

In the 1980s, some army units were transferred to Linton, and by 1990 Waiouru's permanent population had fallen to about 3,000. In 2005, Waiouru's population dropped to about 2,000 with the transfer out of armoured force personnel, and continues to drop as operations are shifted to nearby Linton Camp and Ohakea. But the Army expects a number of courses to continue to be run at Waiouru.

== Waiouru Airfield ==
The Royal New Zealand Air Force uses the sealed Waiouru Airfield (ICAO code NZRU) to the west of the camp for practice landings of C-130 Hercules transport aircraft, and Jameson Field inside the camp for NH-90 and A-109 helicopters.

== HMNZS Irirangi ==
This Radio Intercept Station 2 km south of Waiouru was run by the Royal New Zealand Navy during WWII as Waiouru W/T Station, and from 1951 as HMNZS Irirangi. (Waters 1956) It has now been replaced as an Intercept Station.

== Climate ==
Waiouru's climate is mild, with very little temperature variation from month to month throughout the year, but because of its high altitude and close proximity to Mt Ruapehu it is still relatively cool compared to other North Island population centres, and can get quite cold at anytime of the year when the wind blows down from the mountain. The Desert Road is regularly closed in winter owing to heavy snowfalls. Waiouru's climate can be described as cool temperate, bordering on sub tropical highland, (Köppen Cfb), very similar to the climate of the much higher latitude Edinburgh, Scotland and Metlakatla, Alaska, but with higher diurnal temperature variation.

Climate data for Waiouru (1991–2020 normals, extremes 1962–present)
Month	Jan	Feb	Mar	Apr	May	Jun	Jul	Aug	Sep	Oct	Nov	Dec	Year
Record high °C (°F)	30.1 (86.2)	30.5 (86.9)	26.3 (79.3)	23.2 (73.8)	20.2 (68.4)	19.5 (67.1)	16.6 (61.9)	16.5 (61.7)	21.3 (70.3)	23.0 (73.4)	25.6 (78.1)	27.0 (80.6)	30.5 (86.9)
Mean maximum °C (°F)	25.5 (77.9)	25.4 (77.7)	23.1 (73.6)	20.1 (68.2)	16.9 (62.4)	14.1 (57.4)	13.1 (55.6)	13.8 (56.8)	16.4 (61.5)	18.8 (65.8)	21.2 (70.2)	23.5 (74.3)	26.7 (80.1)
Mean daily maximum °C (°F)	20.1 (68.2)	20.4 (68.7)	18.1 (64.6)	14.7 (58.5)	11.6 (52.9)	8.9 (48.0)	8.3 (46.9)	9.1 (48.4)	11.3 (52.3)	13.3 (55.9)	15.5 (59.9)	18.2 (64.8)	14.1 (57.4)
Daily mean °C (°F)	14.3 (57.7)	14.6 (58.3)	12.6 (54.7)	9.9 (49.8)	7.5 (45.5)	5.1 (41.2)	4.5 (40.1)	5.1 (41.2)	6.8 (44.2)	8.5 (47.3)	10.2 (50.4)	12.8 (55.0)	9.3 (48.8)
Mean daily minimum °C (°F)	8.4 (47.1)	8.9 (48.0)	7.1 (44.8)	5.0 (41.0)	3.3 (37.9)	1.3 (34.3)	0.6 (33.1)	1.0 (33.8)	2.2 (36.0)	3.7 (38.7)	4.9 (40.8)	7.5 (45.5)	4.5 (40.1)
Mean minimum °C (°F)	1.1 (34.0)	1.8 (35.2)	0.0 (32.0)	−1.7 (28.9)	−3.3 (26.1)	−4.8 (23.4)	−5.1 (22.8)	−4.9 (23.2)	−3.8 (25.2)	−2.9 (26.8)	−1.6 (29.1)	0.2 (32.4)	−6.3 (20.7)
Record low °C (°F)	−2.7 (27.1)	−3.3 (26.1)	−3.8 (25.2)	−5.5 (22.1)	−7.7 (18.1)	−10.5 (13.1)	−9.1 (15.6)	−11.1 (12.0)	−6.7 (19.9)	−6.8 (19.8)	−5.1 (22.8)	−3.6 (25.5)	−11.1 (12.0)
Average rainfall mm (inches)	80.8 (3.18)	58.7 (2.31)	59.5 (2.34)	92.9 (3.66)	89.9 (3.54)	107.0 (4.21)	116.8 (4.60)	106.9 (4.21)	101.8 (4.01)	102.3 (4.03)	85.0 (3.35)	86.5 (3.41)	1,088.1 (42.85)
Mean monthly sunshine hours	196.3	182.2	152.4	121.3	99.9	70.4	91.3	110.7	130.3	164.1	173.6	189.2	1,681.7
Mean daily daylight hours	14.6	13.6	12.3	11.0	10.0	9.4	9.7	10.6	11.8	13.1	14.3	14.9	12.1
Percentage possible sunshine	43	47	40	37	32	25	30	34	37	40	40	41	37
Source 1: NIWA
Source 2: Weather Spark (daylight hours)

== Education ==
Waiouru School, a state full primary (Year 1–8) school, is the sole school in Waiouru. It has 93 students as of July 2026. The school opened in 1948.

The nearest secondary school to Waiouru is Ruapehu College, 27 kilometres (17 mi) away in Ohakune.
