= Waihopai Station =

Secure communications facility in New Zealand

Coordinates: 41°34′33.6″S 173°44′20.4″E

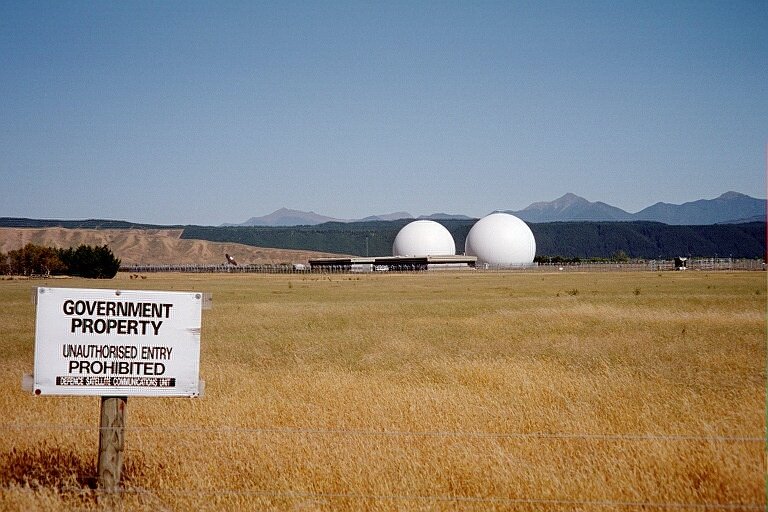
The Waihopai facility, 2002

The Waihopai Station is a secure communication facility, located near Blenheim, run by New Zealand's Government Communications Security Bureau. The station started operating in 1989, and collects data that is then shared with New Zealand's allies. In 2021, it was announced that the parts of the station would be deconstructed and removed from the site. Several protests and disputes surrounding its use and the wider implications of the information gathered has gained the facility some local and international notoriety.

== Function ==
The construction of a new station on 30 hectares of stony ground was authorised by the Prime Minister David Lange and Finance Minister Roger Douglas in 1987. Gerald Hensley comments that Lange: "was ready to work with the Australians [as] … international communications were shifting to satellites … Lange was regularly briefed by me and despite his later claims knew exactly what was involved and why the station was needed. … The Australians were building a similar one at Geraldton [Western Australia] and their Defence Minister explained to the PM why the two installations separated by five time zones would enhance the benefit to both countries."

It has been operating since 1989, and was expanded with the construction of a second interception dish in 1998. It is described as a satellite communications monitoring facility in the Waihopai Valley, near Blenheim. The facility has been identified by MP Keith Locke as part of ECHELON, the worldwide network of signals interception facilities run by the UKUSA consortium of intelligence agencies, which shares global electronic and signals intelligence among the intelligence agencies of the US, UK, Canada, Australia and New Zealand.

The dishes are shielded by giant radomes. Few details of the facility are known. In June 2007, a torus antenna was installed, which is able to receive the signals of up to 35 satellites simultaneously. This antenna is not covered by a radome.

In October 2021, the GCSB announced that the two dishes, and their radomes, would be deconstructed and removed from the station as the technology they used was deemed to be obsolete. For example, in 2021 only 0.5% of the data that the GCSB collected was from the two dishes. In April 2022 the satellites and radomes were deconstructed. Other data collection and information gathering will continue at the station.

=== Southern Cross Cable interception ===
In August 2014, it was revealed that an engineer from the United States National Security Agency had visited New Zealand and held a meeting at Waihopai Station. The topic of discussion was interception of all traffic on the Southern Cross Cable. Due to New Zealand's isolated location, the cable is the only point of international internet and telecommunications access to and from New Zealand. New Zealand politician and Green Party co-leader, Russel Norman, criticised this, saying that it would enable the New Zealand and United States Government to spy on all of New Zealand's internet traffic. The office of National Party Prime Minister, John Key, denied these claims but admitted they were negotiating a "cable access programme" with the NSA but refused to clarify what that was or why the United States NSA was involved.

In May 2014, 3 months prior to this revelation, John Minto, vice-president of the New Zealand Mana Party, had alleged that the NSA was carrying out mass surveillance on all meta-data and content that went into and out of New Zealand through the cable. This followed disclosure in 2013 by the New Zealand Herald that the owners of the cable had asked the NSA for monetary compensation for mass surveillance on the cable.

== Protests and security breaches ==
The site is a regular target for protesters and activists who are attempting to have the base closed down. The Anti-Bases Campaign have had regular yearly protests at the base. In 1996 Nicky Hager entered the base at night with John Campbell and a TV3 film crew, and filmed the operations room through a window. Hager returned in 1999 with Mikey Havoc and Jeremy Wells (as his "Newsboy" persona). They snuck into the base and danced in front of cameras for a television show in which Havoc and Newsboy were starring.

One of the domes collapsed after the 2008 Ploughshares attack

In April 2008, three Ploughshares Aotearoa or Anzac Ploughshares activists breached three security fences to enter the base and then used a sickle to deflate the kevlar covering over one of the two satellite dishes. Prime Minister Helen Clark condemned the attack on the spy base as a "senseless act of criminal vandalism". They waited there until they were arrested and charged with intentional damage and unlawful entry. They were tried in March 2010 where they readily admitted their actions in court but defended it as a "claim of right" to save human lives. Samuel Land (one of the 3) was represented by prominent human rights barrister Antony Shaw. The jury agreed with the argument of the three activists and despite their earlier admissions were acquitted on all charges. One of the protesters said "we broke a law to protect plastic to uphold a law to protect human life."

The New Zealand government sued the trio and won damages of $1.2 million toward the repair of the dome, however, it chose not to pursue the payment. With the publicity surrounding the base and this case, the GCSB directors released an announcement stating that "The claims that the Waihopai station is 'a United States spybase in our midst', contributing to 'torture, war, and the use of weapons of mass destruction' and other 'unspeakable evil' cannot be left unchallenged … It was not – and is not – contributing to 'unspeakable evil'. Quite the reverse."

== See also ==
- Tangimoana Station
- New Zealand intelligence agencies
- New Zealand Security Intelligence Service
- Pine Gap
