= New Zealand intelligence agencies =

New Zealand's intelligence agencies and units have existed, with some interruption, since World War II. At present, New Zealand's intelligence community has approximately 550 employees, and has a combined budget of around NZ$145 million.

According to the New Zealand Government's website "New Zealand Intelligence Community", the Government Communications Security Bureau (GCSB), the New Zealand Security Intelligence Service (NZSIS), and the National Assessments Bureau (NAB) comprise the three core members of the country's intelligence community. These three agencies are supported by intelligence units within other government agencies including the New Zealand Defence Force, the New Zealand Police, the New Zealand Customs Service, and Immigration New Zealand.

== New Zealand Intelligence Community ==
The three core members of the New Zealand Intelligence Community are:

- The Government Communications Security Bureau (GCSB) is the signals intelligence and information security agency of New Zealand. Its main activity is the interception, decryption, and translation of the communications of foreign governments, including both satellite and radio signals. It is responsible for defending the New Zealand government against similar attempts by other countries, and from attempts at electronic eavesdropping.
- The Security Intelligence Service (SIS) is New Zealand's primary national intelligence agency with responsibilities for both national security (including counterterrorism and counterintelligence) and foreign intelligence. It has the highest public profile of New Zealand's intelligence organisations, although it is smaller than the Government Communications Security Bureau.
- The National Assessments Bureau (NAB), previously known as the External Assessments Bureau (EAB), is responsible for collating and analysing information on foreign countries. This information is gathered from a number of sources, both public and secret — some of its work is simply the collection and interpretation of widely available material, while other parts of its work draw on reports by diplomats and by other intelligence agencies. The bureau is part of the Department of the Prime Minister and Cabinet.

== Military Intelligence ==
- The Directorate of Defence Intelligence and Security (DDIS) is part of the New Zealand Defence Force, and is responsible for military intelligence. This includes both specific intelligence for use at the operational level and broad assessments of the military capabilities and intentions of other countries. It is also responsible for administering security clearances within the military, and for supervising the security of sensitive military property.
- GEOINT New Zealand, previously known as the Joint Geospatial Support Facility (JGSF), is a joint team led by the Defence Force in collaboration with the GCSB. It is responsible for geospatial intelligence, providing the military with geographic and mapping data. It also has a non-military role, providing hydrographic services to the public. Its military functions are directed by the DDIS, although it is organisationally independent of it.

== Police Intelligence ==
The New Zealand Police and the Organised and Financial Crime Agency of New Zealand both maintain criminal intelligence, financial intelligence, and national security intelligence capabilities.

- The Organised Crime Intelligence Unit (OCIU) is part of the Organised and Financial Crime Agency of New Zealand, responsible for collecting and analysing intelligence in relation to gangs and organised criminal groups operating in New Zealand. It works closely with the Criminal Investigation Branch and the Asian Crime Squad.
- The Financial Intelligence Unit (FIU) is based in Wellington, and collects information on suspicious financial transaction reports that come from banks and other financial institutions. The FIU also monitors large amounts of cash crossing New Zealand's borders, and supports investigations into money laundering. It is part of the New Zealand Police.
- The Strategic Intelligence Unit (SIU) was created to increase New Zealand's capability and understanding of the domestic and international security environment. The unit will provide strategic and tactical intelligence on terrorism. It will also provide intelligence on complex national and transnational criminal activities that potentially impact the national security of New Zealand and other countries. These activities include people smuggling, identity document fraud and money laundering. It is part of the Organised and Financial Crime Agency of New Zealand.
- The National Drug Intelligence Bureau (NDIB) is a joint agency that includes the New Zealand Police, New Zealand Customs Service, and the Ministry of Health. The mission of the NDIB is to provide authoritative intelligence and advice on illicit and other drugs in order to reduce harm through the prevention and reduction in supply and demand. The NDIB records illicit drug seizures and conducts analysis on drug importation and manufacturing and drug trafficking, supply and distribution by organised crime groups and individuals.
- The National Bureau of Criminal Intelligence (NBCI) is primarily responsible for the provision of tactical and strategic intelligence services at a national level; the maintenance of national criminal intelligence on target groups and activities; the dissemination of intelligence to New Zealand Police and other agencies; the maintenance of a 24-hour tactical crime intelligence response; and the maintenance of suspicious transaction reporting and money laundering reporting.
- The Identity Intelligence Unit has set up a number of business relationships within both the public and private sector. One of its key goals is to accurately measure the nature and extent of identity crime in New Zealand. Other work has been carried out to aid in detecting, prosecuting, and preventing identity crime.
- The Threat Assessment Unit (TAU) is responsible for a range of areas, including the collection, collation, analysis and dissemination of intelligence on activist groups and potential threats nationally and internationally; analysis of threats to visiting government officials and preparation of assessments; analysis of threats to New Zealand government officials and preparation of assessments; analysis of threats to New Zealand politicians and preparation of assessments; maintaining "Project Topaz" for threats against investigative staff; management of dossiers on activist groups and persons; and responding to counter-terrorist threats or situations.
- The Police Terrorism Investigation and Intelligence Group (PTIIG) was formed in 2002, and put 26 staff in New Zealand's airports to investigate and collection intelligence on terrorist activities.
- The Special Investigation Group (SIG) was formed after the 11 September 2001 attacks to focus on threats to national security.

== Policy and Coordination ==
- The Cabinet National Security Committee (NSC) is the New Zealand Cabinet national security committee, hosted by the Department of the Prime Minister and Cabinet and was created in October 2014 by the Fifth National Government. The NSC is responsible for the policy and oversight of the New Zealand intelligence and security sector. The NSC is chaired by the Prime Minister and includes senior Ministers for the portfolios of Finance, Defence, Economic Development, Communications, Attorney-General, Foreign Affairs, Police and Immigration.
- The Officials Committee for Domestic and External Security Co-ordination (ODESC) is the primary governance board that is made up of the Prime Minister, cabinet ministers, and the heads of the military and intelligence agencies. The ODESC deals with national security threats that affect New Zealand and its interests, both onshore and offshore. It coordinates the activities of central government agencies in preparing for and responding to security crises, emergencies and natural disasters. DESG is part of the Department of the Prime Minister and Cabinet.
- The National Security Group (NSG) of the Department of the Prime Minister and Cabinet is responsible for the coordination and development of strategy, policy and operations for New Zealand's national security and the New Zealand Intelligence Community. The NSG is led by the Deputy Chief Executive for Security and Intelligence (DCE SIG). The NSG contains the National Security Systems Directorate, the National Security Policy Directorate, the National Security Communications Directorate, the Intelligence and Assessment Directorate (housing the National Assessments Bureau), and the National Cyber Policy Office. The NSG is also tasked with assisting the coordination of New Zealand intelligence agencies and supporting the intelligence governance responsibilities of the Officials Committee for Domestic and External Security Co-ordination. The NSG coordinates intelligence requirements, risk management, performance reporting, and relationships with intelligence agencies around the world and works with the National Assessments Bureau.

== Others ==
- MI is a secret intelligence unit within the Ministry of Business, Innovation and Employment (MBIE) focusing on immigration, "national intelligence and security," and operational matters. As of 2023, it has a budget of NZ$11 million and 115 personnel. MI has a "National Security Intelligence Team." Unlike the NZSIS, GCSB, and National Assessments Bureau, MI lacks scrutiny from an intelligence watchdog but only has an internal monitoring team. In October 2023, MI drew criticism from the Federation of Islamic Associations of New Zealand for using tools from Israeli surveillance firm Cobwebs Technologies to scour the social media accounts of prospective immigrants.

== Budgets and Staff ==
Organisation	Approximate budget	Approximate staff
Government Communications Security Bureau	NZ$95.2m	400
Security Intelligence Service	NZ$45.2m	300
National Assessments Bureau	NZ$3.5m	30
Directorate of Defence Intelligence and Security	NZ$1.8m?	32

(Budget figures from 2015 Budget appropriations for Intelligence and Security, and Treasury estimates in the 2006 Budget; staff figures from individual websites or from Securing our Nation's Safety, a December 2000 report by the DPMC)

== Oversight ==
=== Ministerial responsibility ===
The Security Intelligence Service and the Government Communications Security Bureau, being considered government departments in their own right, each have a Minister responsible for them. By tradition, the Prime Minister takes both these portfolios directly. The National Assessments Bureau, as part of the Department of the Prime Minister and Cabinet, is also under the Prime Minister's supervision — directly with regard to its intelligence functions, and indirectly (through the head of the department) for administrative purposes. The Directorate of Defence Intelligence and Security and the Joint Geospatial Support Facility are the only ones not under the effective control of the Prime Minister — as part of the Defence Force they are subordinate to the Minister of Defence.

On 6 October 2014, Prime Minister John Key created a new ministerial portfolio called the Minister of National Security and Intelligence. The Minister of National Security and Intelligence will be responsible for setting national security and intelligence policy and legislation, and will also head a newly established Cabinet National Security Committee. The Prime Minister will assume the new portfolio while the Attorney General Christopher Finlayson will assume the portfolios of Minister Responsible for the GCSB and Minister in Charge of the NZSIS. The convention of delegating the GCSB and NZSIS portfolios to ministers was also observed by subsequent prime ministers Bill English and Jacinda Ardern, though Ardern's government did not continue the standalone Cabinet National Security Committee.

=== Parliamentary scrutiny ===
The Intelligence and Security Committee is a committee of the Parliament of New Zealand, although it differs from an ordinary Select committee in that it is established directly by legislation. It consists of the Prime Minister, the Leader of the Opposition, two further MPs nominated by the Prime Minister, and one further MP nominated by the Leader of the Opposition. The committee meets much more rarely than ordinary Select Committees, however — according to some claims, for less than an hour each year.

=== Inspector-General ===
The Inspector-General of Intelligence and Security is a retired judge who is appointed to supervise the Security Intelligence Service and the Government Communications Security Bureau, ensuring that they remain within the law. The Inspector-General presents an annual report to the Prime Minister and the Leader of the Opposition.

== Controversies ==
The operations, the organisation, and indeed, the existence of intelligence agencies in New Zealand has often been a source of controversy. While both major political parties (Labour and National) broadly support the current arrangements, there exists a movement which seeks an overhaul of the system, or even the outright abolition of New Zealand's intelligence agencies. The Green Party, for example, aims to abolish the GCSB and possibly the SIS — the functions of the former are deemed unnecessary and undesirable, while the functions of the latter are suggested as better performed by the Police.

New Zealand's intelligence agencies, particularly the SIS, have sometimes been accused of inappropriate activities. The cases of Bill Sutch, Aziz Choudry, and Ahmed Zaoui, for example, have all prompted claims that the SIS has violated individual rights. The extent to which the agencies are accountable to Parliament and to the public has also been questioned in some quarters. Another common allegation, made by organisations such as the Green Party and the Anti-Bases Campaign, is that New Zealand's intelligence agencies are subordinated to their partner agencies in other countries, particularly the United States. The Green Party describes the Government Communications Security Bureau as working "for the benefit of American and British interests rather than for the benefit of New Zealand", and the Anti-Bases Campaign calls them "simply outposts of American Intelligence".

Defenders of the intelligence agencies argue that they perform a necessary role, and that (in the words of former Prime Minister Geoffrey Palmer) "a robust legislative framework makes sure these agencies operate within the law". In 2006, the director of the GCSB, Warren Tucker, took the unprecedented step of publishing a general response to criticisms of his agency. The response, carried by national newspapers, strongly denied accusations that the GCSB was under the control of its foreign allies, saying that "the GCSB's actions have been and remain entirely consistent with, and subordinate to, the policies and interests of the New Zealand Government of the day". It defended New Zealand's connection with these foreign agencies, stating that "New Zealand enjoys immense benefits from its membership of this long-standing partnership", and similarly rejected allegations that the GCSB failed to keep the government properly informed about all of its operations.

New Zealand's intelligence agencies, particularly the GCSB and NZSIS, drew criticism for failing to detect and prevent the Christchurch mosque shootings which occurred on 15 March 2019. In December 2020, a Royal Commission of Inquiry into the mosque shootings criticised intelligence agencies for focusing on Islamic extremism at the expense of other threats including White supremacy and recommended creating a new agency focusing on counter-terrorism strategy. In late March 2021, NZSIS Director-General Rebecca Kitteridge acknowledged that her agency had focused 100% of its investigations into Islamic extremism prior to the Christchurch mosque shootings and indicated that the NZSIS would be paying more attention to far right and white supremacist groups.

== See also ==
- Australian Intelligence Community
- Foreign espionage in New Zealand
- Terrorism in New Zealand
- Nicky Hager
