= Suhayra Aden =

New Zealand Islamist

- Born: 1995 (age 30–31); Auckland, New Zealand
- Citizenship: New Zealand citizen by birth (formerly also held dual citizenship with Australia)
- Known for: Travelling to Syria to join ISIL as a Jihadi bride
- Spouse: 2 (both deceased)
- Children: 3 (1 deceased)

Suhayra Aden (born 1995) is a New Zealand woman who travelled to Syria in 2014. It is alleged that while in Syria she joined the Islamic State of Iraq and the Levant (ISIL) where she married two Swedish fighters and had three children. In February 2021, she was detained by Turkish authorities while trying to enter the country with her two surviving children. Turkey subsequently dropped charges against Aden and began proceedings to deport her.

Formerly a dual citizen, Aden was stripped of her Australian citizenship in 2020 as a result of allegedly engaging in terrorism. The move was announced and defended by Australian Prime Minister Scott Morrison; it was met with scepticism internationally and uproar in New Zealand. Australia has a history of deporting non-citizens who have committed crimes or breached their "character test," regardless of whether they have only ever committed crimes in Australia, or if they spent virtually their whole lives in Australia. New Zealand Prime Minister Jacinda Ardern accused Morrison's government of trying to abandon Aden (who had lived in Australia since the age of 6 before allegedly joining ISIL) so New Zealand would have to deal with her and the associated expenses instead. Following a phone conversation, the two leaders agreed to work together in the "spirit of the Australian-New Zealand relationship" to address what Ardern called "quite a complex legal situation."

On 26 July 2021, Ardern announced that Cabinet had agreed to repatriate Aden and her two children on the basis of their status as New Zealand citizens. Aden and her two children will be the first New Zealanders to be repatriated from Syria allegedly associated with ISIL. In mid-August 2021, Aden and her two children landed in New Zealand.

== Background ==
Suhayra Aden was born in 1995 in Auckland's Mount Roskill suburb. Aden grew up in a Somalian refugee family who had become New Zealand citizens. According to a 1News report, her father was unemployed while her mother was a housewife. At the age of six, she and her family emigrated to Melbourne, Australia where they subsequently acquired Australian citizenship.

== Joining ISIL and repatriation ==
In 2014, Aden traveled to Syria via Turkey and lived under the Islamic State. According to ABC News journalist Dylan Welch, she experienced second thoughts and unsuccessfully attempted to call her mother in order to return to Australia. However, she was part of a group bound for Syria and was unable to escape from them. She subsequently traveled in a van to ISIL-controlled territory. While there, she married and had three children with two Swedish men. One of her children subsequently died of pneumonia in Syria.

Between September and October 2019, the ABC journalists Dylan Welch and Suzanne Drudge met Aden and her children at the Al-Hawl refugee camp in Syria while on an assignment to interview several Australian women who had joined ISIL. Aden reportedly expressed her desire to return to Australia. In 2020, the Australian Government stripped her of her Australian citizenship, leaving her as a New Zealand national. On 15 February 2021, she and her two surviving children (who both have New Zealand citizenship) were detained by Turkish authorities while crossing the border from Idlib. The border crossing was an attempt to escape ISIL. The Turkish Ministry of National Defence alleged that Aden was an ISIL terrorist. On 20 February, the Turkish Government dropped charges against Aden and began proceedings to deport her.

On 9 March 2021, Radio New Zealand reported than an unidentified Turkish Foreign Ministry official stated that New Zealand Foreign Affairs officials had indicated they would take Aden home but to expect delays due to the global COVID-19 pandemic. That same day, an unidentified New Zealand cabinet minister stated that Aden would be "free subject to conditions" upon returning to New Zealand. Justice Minister Andrew Little and Police Minister Poto Williams indicated that Aden would be subject to monitoring under "Control Orders," which were criticized by Opposition Leader Judith Collins as insufficient.

On 26 July 2021, New Zealand Prime Minister Jacinda Ardern announced that Cabinet had agreed to repatriate Aden and her two children back to New Zealand. They have been held in an immigration detention centre in Turkey since 15 February 2021. Aden and her two children, who are New Zealand citizens by birth and descent, became the responsibility of the New Zealand government after Australia stripped Aden's Australian citizenship in 2020. Ardern stated that the welfare and best interests of Aden's children were the primary concern. She also reassured the public that great care was being taken to ensure that the family's return to New Zealand was being managed in a way that minimises any risk to New Zealanders. Details about the repatriation arrangements will not be made public for legal, operational and security reasons. However, it is expected that Aden will be subject to conditions under the Terrorism Suppression (Control Orders) Act 2019 upon arrival back in New Zealand. Additionally, New Zealand government agencies are ensuring that appropriate actions are taken to address potential security concerns and that the right support is available to support the family's reintegration.

The New Zealand Police have confirmed that they are undertaking a terrorism investigation. Massey University teaching fellow Dr John Battersby, who specialises in counter-terrorism and intelligence said that Aden would be interviewed upon arrival to New Zealand to ascertain the extent of her involvement and association with ISIL. This information would then be used to determine whether or not Aden posed a risk to the safety of New Zealanders. Battersby stated that it would be highly, highly unlikely that Aden would be charged with terrorism offences under the Terrorism Suppression Act 2002 given the difficulty of obtaining evidence from Syria.

According to Aden's lawyer, Deborah Manning, she is "looking forward to being in New Zealand and giving her children an opportunity at living here and integrating, and really wishes to have privacy for them to allow them to settle in here and come to terms with everything they have been through." By contrast, in late July 2021, Collins described Aden as a terrorist for marrying into the Islamic State "death cult," questioning the sufficiency of security arrangements.

On 21 August 2021, Aden and her two children arrived in New Zealand on an Air New Zealand flight. They entered into managed isolation due to the ongoing COVID-19 pandemic in the country. Prime Minister Ardern and the New Zealand Police also confirmed that preparations had been made to facilitate Aden and her children's return and resettlement in New Zealand. Aden's lawyer stated that Aden was looking forward to living with her children in New Zealand but wanted privacy to deal with everything they had encountered.

=== Political responses ===
The Australian Government's decision to revoke Aden's Australian citizenship was criticised by Ardern, who accused Australia of abdicating its responsibilities to its citizens and indicated she had raised the matter with her Australian counterpart Scott Morrison. Ardern confirmed that New Zealand was providing consular support to Aden and her children. Morrison defended Australia's decision as putting Australia's national security interests first, citing legislation allowing Australia to revoke the citizenship of a dual national engaged in terrorist activities. Following a phone conversation, the two leaders agreed to work together in the "spirit of the relationship" to address what Ardern described as "quite a complex legal situation."

During a state visit to the New Zealand city of Queenstown in late May 2021, Morrison reiterated Australia's decision not to allow Aden to return on the grounds that she was not an Australian citizen. However, he indicated during discussions with Ardern that Australia would be open to giving Aden's two remaining children (aged two and five) a pathway to settling in Australia.

=== Public responses ===
Rodger Shahanan of the Australian think tank Lowy Institute stated that the New Zealand Government was legally and morally obliged to look after dual New Zealand nationals who had been stripped of their foreign nationality. By contrast, University of Auckland law Associate-Professor John Ip criticised Australia's decision to revoke Aden's citizenship as an example of "legalised NIMBYism with dual citizens as objects." Similarly, University of Waikato law professor Claire Breen argued that Aden's children were innocent and should be entitled to basic human rights protection including citizenship in accordance with the Convention on the Rights of the Child, which both Australia and New Zealand are signatories to.

Meanwhile, the Islamic Women's Council of New Zealand's spokesperson Anjum Rahman called for New Zealand to establish de-radicalisation programmes based on the Australian and British models. Legal expert Paul Buchanan stated that prosecutors would have to prove that Aden supported ISIL for her to be charged under anti-terror legislation such as the Terrorism Suppression Act. Similar sentiments were echoed by University of Waikato law Professor Alexander Gillespie who stated that steps needed to be taken to integrate Aden's two children into New Zealand society.
