= National Assessments Bureau =

Intelligence assessment agency of New Zealand

Agency overview
- Formed: 1949, as the Joint Intelligence Office
- Jurisdiction: Government of New Zealand
- Headquarters: Wellington, New Zealand
- Employees: 30
- Annual budget: $3.1 m NZD (2006/07)
- Minister responsible: Christopher Luxon, Prime Minister of New Zealand
- Agency executive: Cecille Hillyer, Director
- Parent agency: Department of the Prime Minister and Cabinet
- Website: National Assessments Bureau

The National Assessments Bureau (NAB), previously known as the External Assessments Bureau (EAB), is a New Zealand intelligence analysis agency within the Department of the Prime Minister and Cabinet (DPMC). The NAB along with the Government Communications Security Bureau and the New Zealand Security Intelligence Service is one of the three core members of New Zealand's intelligence community. It provides assessments to the Prime Minister, other Ministers, senior officials and New Zealand's diplomatic missions abroad, on events and developments that bear on New Zealand's interests, especially in regard to matters of national security.

== Functions and structure ==
The NAB is responsible for collecting and analysing information on external matters which may affect New Zealand, including foreign states, individuals, and events. It draws its information from a range of public and confidential sources including the Security Intelligence Service (NZSIS), Government Communications Security Bureau (GCSB), New Zealand diplomatic posts, academic discourse, the media, and other publicly available sources. The NAB itself does not undertake intelligence-gathering operations. Its role is to interpret and process information from other sources, producing reports which may be used as a basis for decision-making in other branches of government.

Unlike the SIS and GCSB, the NAB is not subject to the oversight of the Intelligence and Security Committee or the jurisdiction of the Inspector-General of Intelligence and Security. The NAB is part of the Security and Intelligence Group within the Department of the Prime Minister and Cabinet. The current Director of the National Assessments Bureau is Cecile Hillyer. The NAB has thirty staff, with most being assessment analysts specializing on regional or topical issues. The Director of the NAB also chairs the National Intelligence Coordination Committee, which coordinates the efforts of the New Zealand intelligence community. Together with the NZSIS and GCSB, the NAB forms one of the three core members of New Zealand's intelligence community.

== History ==
The National Assessments Bureau's origins can be traced back to the Joint Intelligence Office (JIO), which was established in 1949. In 1953, it was renamed the Joint Intelligence Bureau (JIB). In 1975, the JIB was renamed the External Intelligence Bureau (EIB). In 1988, the EIB was renamed the External Assessments Bureau (EAB). By 1990, the EAB had been incorporated into the Department of the Prime Minister and Cabinet (DPMC). In March 2010 the EAB was renamed the National Assessments Bureau (NAB) and given a domestic security focus as well.

== See also ==
- Office of National Assessments (Australia)
