= Cabinet National Security Committee (New Zealand) =

Committee of the Department of the Prime Minister and Cabinet in New Zealand

New Zealand Cabinet National Security Committee

Committee overview
- Formed: 6 October 2014
- Committee executives: Christopher Luxon, Prime Minister (Chair); Winston Peters, Minister of Foreign Affairs (Deputy Chair)
- Parent department: Department of the Prime Minister and Cabinet
- Website: Cabinet National Security Committee

The Cabinet National Security Committee (NSC) is a cabinet-level committee of the New Zealand Department of the Prime Minister and Cabinet, that was created in October 2014 by the Fifth National Government. This body is modelled after the British National Security Council and the Australian National Security Committee of Cabinet. The NSC is headed by the Minister of National Security and Intelligence.

The NSC oversees the New Zealand's intelligence community and security services, and it is tasked with considering policies and proposals related to those departments. Another function of the NSC is to coordinate and direct national responses to major crises or national security problems. The Committee members include the Prime Minister and ministers responsible for the Civil Defence, Defence, Foreign Affairs, Government Communications Security Bureau, New Zealand Security Intelligence Service, and Police portfolios.

== Committee Members ==
Image	Name	Portfolio(s)
	The Rt. Hon. Christopher Luxon	Prime Minister
	The Rt. Hon. Christopher Luxon	Leader of the New Zealand National Party
	The Rt. Hon. Christopher Luxon	Minister of National Security and Intelligence
	The Rt. Hon. Winston Peters	Deputy Prime Minister
	The Rt. Hon. Winston Peters	Minister of Foreign Affairs
	The Rt. Hon. Winston Peters	Minister for Racing
	The Hon. Mark Mitchell	Minister of Corrections
	The Hon. Mark Mitchell	Minister for Emergency Management
	The Hon. Mark Mitchell	Minister of Police
	The Hon. Judith Collins	Minister of Defence
	The Hon. Judith Collins	Lead Coordination Minister for the Government’s; Response to the Royal Commission’s Report into the Terrorist Attack on the Christchurch Mosques
	The Hon. Judith Collins	Minister Responsible for the GCSB
	The Hon. Judith Collins	Minister Responsible for the NZSIS
	The Hon. Judith Collins	Attorney General
	The Hon. Judith Collins	Minister for the Digital Economy and Communications
	The Hon. Simon Watts	Minister for the Environment
	The Hon. Simon Watts	Minister of Revenue
	The Hon. Todd McClay	Minister of Agriculture
	The Hon. Todd McClay	Minister for Biosecurity
	The Hon. Todd McClay	Minister for Trade and Export Growth
	The Hon. Erica Stanford	Minister of Immigration
	The Hon. Nicola Willis	Minister of Finance
