= Danzeisen =

Danzeisen is a German surname ( eisen means "iron", from Middle High German īsen; danz- means "dance", from Middle High German danzen or tanzen). It implies a blacksmith (someone who makes the iron "dance" under their hammer), or a tireless dancer.

Notable people with the surname include:

- Emil Danzeisen (1897–1965), German paramilitary activist, SA and SS officer.
- Peter Danzeisen (born 1941), Swiss director.
- Matt Danzeisen, American investor.
- Aliya Danzeisen, New Zealand Muslim activist.
- Marc Danzeisen (born 1961), American drummer and musician.
