= New Zealand House of Representatives committees =

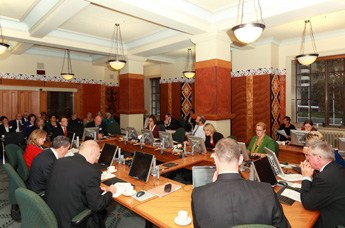
A committee of the New Zealand House of Representatives meeting during the 49th New Zealand Parliament.

Committees of the New Zealand House of Representatives are subsets of the New Zealand House of Representatives which deal with specific tasks delegated to them by the House. The functions of committees include scrutinising draft legislation (bills), conducting inquiries into subjects within their expertise, receiving public comment on matters before them, and overseeing the operation of the public service (including, for some committees, the operation of Parliament).

Most parliamentary committees are composed of between five and twelve members of Parliament. These are known as select committees. In addition, a committee of the whole House, comprising all members, conducts detailed scrutiny of draft legislation. For more information, see New Zealand House of Representatives committees § Committee of the whole House.

== Select committees ==
Since the 1960s select committees have taken an increasingly powerful role, dealing with more bills. From the 1970s they became more open to the public and the media, and from 1979 they handled nearly all legislation. The present system, with permanent committees for designated subject matters, was implemented in 1985, in order to promote accountability and a greater separation of Parliament from government. The strengthening of the committee system was in response to concerns that legislation was being forced through, without receiving due examination and revision. Today, public meetings of select committees are livestreamed online.

Each new Parliament appoints a number of select committees, which remain largely unchanged between parliaments. Committees for the 54rd Parliament are established by Standing Order 185. If a bill passes its first reading, it is referred to a select committee for scrutiny. Which committee receives the bill is determined by the member responsible for the bill, subject to the agreement of the House, and the referral motion is not a debatable motion in the House. By default, committees have six months to consider legislation although this can be varied on a case-by-case basis.

Committees can call for submissions from the public, thereby meaning that there is a degree of public consultation before a parliamentary bill proceeds into law. They may recommend amendments to a bill and they may recommend bills are divided into two or more bills. Committees may ask other committees for their opinion on legislation. Committees' recommendations on bills are reported back to the House and voted on at the bill's second reading. The version of the bill approved by the select committee is then scrutinised by the committee of the whole House.

Select committees are sometimes referred to as the "engine room" of Parliament. Most (but not all) committees are chaired by MPs from government parties and have government majorities. There have been calls from the likes of former Green MP Sue Kedgley in 2012 and ACT New Zealand leader David Seymour in 2021 for increased independence of select committees by providing greater opportunities for opposition chairs and opposition majorities on committees.

The 2023 Standing Orders introduced two scrutiny weeks a year, which allow select committees to scrutinise government and public sector spending plans. The first scrutiny week was held from 17 to 21 June 2024.

=== Types of select committees ===
There are two main types of select committees:

- Subject committees – established to oversee government actions and policy in a specified subject area, as well as examining bills in detail. Subject committees are empowered to hold the Government to account, with ministers presenting evidence and answering questions as necessary. The committees may recommend amendments to a bill when they report back to the House and such recommendations are voted on at the second reading. There are currently twelve such committees.
- Specialist committees – established to oversee the procedures of the House itself. There are currently eight such committees.

The House may also create additional select committees to conduct investigations into specific matters. This may be to consider specific legislation without adding to a subject select committee's work programme (for example, the Pae Ora Legislation Committee for the Pae Ora (Healthy Futures) Bill in 2021–22), to consider legislation that spans more than one subject select committee's remit (for example, the Abortion Legislation Committee for the Abortion Legislation Bill in 2019–20), or to undertake a particular review (for example, the Epidemic Response Committee in 2020).

Of the specialist committees, the Business Committee has an important role in relation to other committees because it decides the membership of subject select committees.

=== Composition ===
Each committee consists of between five and twelve MPs. Political parties are generally represented approximately in similar proportions as they are represented in the House as a whole. Membership of committees is determined by the Business Committee at the beginning of each parliament. Attempts are made to allocate MPs into committees for subject areas those MPs have experience in. Each committee has its own chairperson and deputy chairperson who are elected by the committee. MPs may be members of more than one select committee. Cabinet ministers do not sit on committees generally, though there are some exceptions (usually for specialist committees). Some ministers outside Cabinet are required to sit on subject committees to ensure that the governing parties can fill all their allocated places.

Membership of the Business Committee itself is determined by the Speaker (who chairs) and political party leaders.

== List of committees in the 54th Parliament ==
Committees of the 54th Parliament
Committee	Subject(s)	Chairperson	Government–Opposition divide
Subject Committees
Economic Development, Science and Innovation Committee	Business development, tourism, Crown minerals, commerce, consumer protection and trading standards, research, science, innovation, intellectual property, broadcasting, communications, and information technology.	Parmjeet Parmar (ACT)	4–4
Education and Workforce Committee	Education, training, employment, immigration, industrial relations, health and safety, and accident compensation.	Katie Nimon (National)	5–4
Environment Committee	Conservation, environment, and climate change.	Catherine Wedd (National)	5–4
Finance and Expenditure Committee	Economic and fiscal policy, taxation, revenue, banking and finance, superannuation, insurance, Government expenditure and financial performance, and public audit.	Cameron Brewer (National)	6–5
Foreign Affairs, Defence and Trade Committee	Customs, defence, disarmament and arms control, foreign affairs, trade and veterans’ affairs.	Tim van de Molen (National)	4–3
Governance and Administration Committee	Parliamentary and legislative services, Prime Minister and Cabinet, State services, statistics, internal affairs, civil defence and emergency management, and local government.	Camilla Belich (Labour)	4–3
Health Committee	Health.	Sam Uffindell (National)	5–4
Justice Committee	Constitutional and electoral matters, human rights, justice, courts, crime and criminal law, police, corrections, and Crown legal services.	Hon Andrew Bayly (National)	6–5
Māori Affairs Committee	Māori affairs and Treaty of Waitangi negotiations.	David MacLeod (National)	4–4
Parliament Bill Committee	This committee was established by the House to consider and report on the Parliament Bill and any associated business that may be referred to it. The Parliament Bill would consolidate and modernise the four acts that currently relate to the operation of Parliament.	Rt Hon Adrian Rurawhe (Labour)	4–4
Primary Production Committee	Agriculture, biosecurity, racing, fisheries, productive forestry, lands, and land information.	Mark Cameron (ACT)	4–3
Social Services and Community Committee	Social development, social housing, income support, women, children, young people, seniors, Pacific peoples, ethnic communities, arts, culture and heritage, sport and recreation, voluntary sector.	Joseph Mooney (National)	5–4
Transport and Infrastructure Committee	Transport, transport safety, infrastructure, energy, building and construction.	Andy Foster (NZ First)	4–3
Specialist Committees
Business Committee	Each year it recommends when Parliament meets and when matters are debated (the order of business). It decides who the members of select committees are. It also determines if Parliament meets for extended periods of time (extended settings).	Speaker Rt Hon Gerry Brownlee (National)	5–4
Intelligence and Security Committee	Looks at business related to New Zealand’s intelligence and security networks.	Prime Minister Rt Hon Christopher Luxon (National)	4–3
Officers of Parliament Committee	Oversees the officers of Parliament and recommends persons for appointment as officers of Parliament to the House.	Speaker Rt Hon Gerry Brownlee (National)	5–4
Petitions Committee	Reviews petitions presented to parliament and actions them or forwards them to the relevant committee.	Assistant Speaker Greg O'Connor (Labour)	2–2
Privileges Committee	Focuses on the rights and freedoms that allow the House of Representatives to do its work and make laws free from outside interference.	Attorney-General Hon Judith Collins (National)	5–4
Regulations Review Committee	To keep New Zealand running efficiently, law making powers are often given to bodies that are not Parliament. These bodies make rules about common things like ACC fees, industry standards and civil defence responses that can have a nationwide impact. The Committee makes sure that all these rules have been made fairly and are used consistently.	Arena Williams (Labour)	3–2
Standing Orders Committee	Reviews or considers the rules that govern how the House operates.	Speaker Rt Hon Gerry Brownlee (National)	5–4

== Historical composition of committees ==
The following table lists the select and specialist committees of the previous, and their respective chairs and membership breakdown.

=== 53rd Parliament ===
Bolded and italicized denotes a temporary committee established uniquely during the 53rd Parliament.

Committees of the 52nd Parliament
Committee	Chairperson	Government–Opposition divide
Subject Committees
Economic Development, Science and Innovation Committee	Jamie Strange (Labour)	3–2
Education and Workforce Committee	Marja Lubeck (Labour)	6–3
Environment Committee	Hon Eugenie Sage (Green Party)	6–3
Finance and Expenditure Committee	Barbara Edmonds (Labour)	7–4
Foreign Affairs, Defence and Trade Committee	Hon Jenny Salesa (Labour)	4–2
Governance and Administration Committee	Ian McKelvie (National)	3–2
Health Committee	Tangi Utikere (Labour)	6–4
Justice Committee	Ginny Andersen (Labour)	5–4
Māori Affairs Committee	Tāmati Coffey (Labour)	5–3
Primary Production Committee	Jo Luxton (Labour)	4–4
Social Services and Community Committee	Angie Warren-Clark (Labour)	6–3
Transport and Infrastructure Committee	Shanan Halbert (Labour)	6–3
Specialist Committees
Business Committee	Speaker Rt Hon Adrian Rurawhe (Labour)	6–5
Intelligence and Security Committee	Prime Minister Rt Hon Chris Hipkins (Labour)	4–3
Officers of Parliament Committee	Speaker Rt Hon Adrian Rurawhe (Labour)	4–4
**Pae Ora Legislation Committee**	Deborah Russell (Labour)	7–4
Petitions Committee	Assistant Speaker Hon Jacqui Dean (National)	4–3
Privileges Committee	Attorney-General Hon David Parker (Labour)	5–3
Regulations Review Committee	Chris Penk (National)	4–3
Standing Orders Committee	Rt Hon Adrian Rurawhe (Labour)	5–5

=== 52nd Parliament ===
Bolded and italicized denotes a temporary committee established uniquely during the 52nd Parliament.

Committees of the 52nd Parliament
Committee	Chairperson	Government–Opposition divide
Select Committees
**Abortion Legislation Committee**	Hon Ruth Dyson (Labour)	4–3
**Epidemic Response Committee**	Leader of the Opposition Hon Simon Bridges (National)	5–6
Economic Development, Science and Innovation Committee	Jonathan Young (National)	5–5
Education and Workforce Committee	Parmjeet Parmar (National)	6–5
Environment Committee	Duncan Webb (Labour)	5–4
Finance and Expenditure Committee	Deborah Russell (Labour)	7–6
Foreign Affairs, Defence and Trade Committee	Simon O'Connor (National)	4–4
Governance and Administration Committee	Jian Yang (National)	4–4
Health Committee	Louisa Wall (Labour)	4–4
Justice Committee	Hon Meka Whaitiri (Labour)	4–4
Māori Affairs Committee	Rino Tirikatene (Labour)	4–4
Primary Production Committee	Barbara Kuriger (National)	4–4
Social Services and Community Committee	Gareth Hughes (Green Party)	5–4
Transport and Infrastructure Committee	Darroch Ball (NZ First)	5–4
Specialist Committees
Business Committee	Speaker Rt Hon Trevor Mallard (Labour)	7–5
Intelligence and Security Committee	Prime Minister Rt Hon Jacinda Ardern (Labour)	4–3
Officers of Parliament Committee	Speaker Rt Hon Trevor Mallard (Labour)	4–2
Privileges Committee	Hon David Parker (Labour)	5–5
Regulations Review Committee	Alastair Scott (National)	3–3
Standing Orders Committee	Speaker Rt Hon Trevor Mallard (Labour)	5–5

== Committee of the whole House ==
The procedure of legislation passing through Parliament requires the House to form itself into a "Committee of the whole House" following a second reading, allowing for the bill to be debated clause-by-clause or part-by-part by all Members. This committee sees the Deputy Speaker or Assistant Speakers presiding over it.

== See also ==
- Politics of New Zealand
- New Zealand Parliament
- Constitution of New Zealand
