= Department of Industry and Commerce =

Department of Industry and Commerce may refer to:

- Department of Industry and Commerce (1975–1982), Australian government department
- Department of Industry and Commerce (1982–1984), Australian government department
- Department of Industry and Commerce (Ireland)
- Department of Industries and Commerce (1894–1972), former New Zealand government department
