= Minister for National Security and Intelligence (New Zealand) =

New Zealand minister of the Crown

- Coat of arms of New Zealand

- Flag of New Zealand

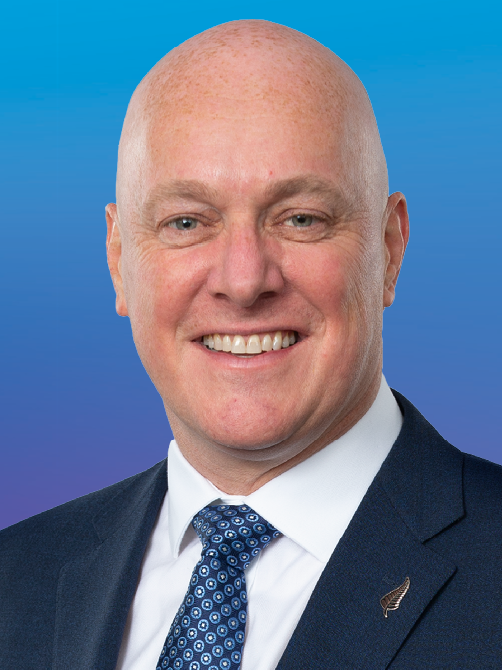
- Incumbent; Christopher Luxon since 27 November 2023
- Department of the Prime Minister and Cabinet
- Style: The Honourable
- Member of: Cabinet of New Zealand; Executive Council
- Reports to: Prime Minister of New Zealand
- Appointer: Governor-General of New Zealand
- Term length: At His Majesty's pleasure
- Formation: 8 October 2014
- First holder: John Key

The Minister for National Security and Intelligence is a minister in the New Zealand Government who is responsible for leading and setting the policies and legislative framework of New Zealand's national security system. By convention, the portfolio is held by the Prime Minister, currently Christopher Luxon.

== Role and responsibility ==
The Minister for National Security and Intelligence is responsible for overseeing policy and legislation relating to New Zealand's national security apparatus. The Minister also chairs the Cabinet National Security Committee and the Parliamentary specialist committee on Intelligence and Security. The minister does not provide direct oversight to New Zealand's main two intelligence agencies, the New Zealand Security Intelligence Service (NZSIS) and Government Communications Security Bureau (GCSB), which is instead provided by two separate portfolios, Minister Responsible for the NZSIS and Minister Responsible for the GCSB. Administrative support for the portfolio is provided by the Department of the Prime Minister and Cabinet.

Prior to the creation of the National Security and Intelligence portfolio in 2014, the NZSIS and GCSB portfolios were, by convention and without exception, held by the Prime Minister, meaning sole ministerial oversight of New Zealand's intelligence and security agencies and arrangements lay with the Prime Minister. The portfolio was established following the 2014 election by Prime Minister John Key as part of a rearrangement to the way New Zealand's intelligence sector was governed. Since then it has been convention for the Prime Minister to hold the National Security and Intelligence portfolio, while direct ministerial oversight for the NZSIS and GCSB is delegated to another senior minister.

== List of ministers for national security and intelligence ==
Key

National Labour

No.	Name	Portrait	Term of office		Prime Minister
1	John Key		8 October 2014	12 December 2016	Key
2	Bill English		12 December 2016	26 October 2017	English
3	Jacinda Ardern		26 October 2017	25 January 2023	Ardern
4	Chris Hipkins		25 January 2023	27 November 2023	Hipkins
5	Christopher Luxon		27 November 2023	Incumbent	Luxon
