= Warren Tucker =

New Zealand intelligence officer

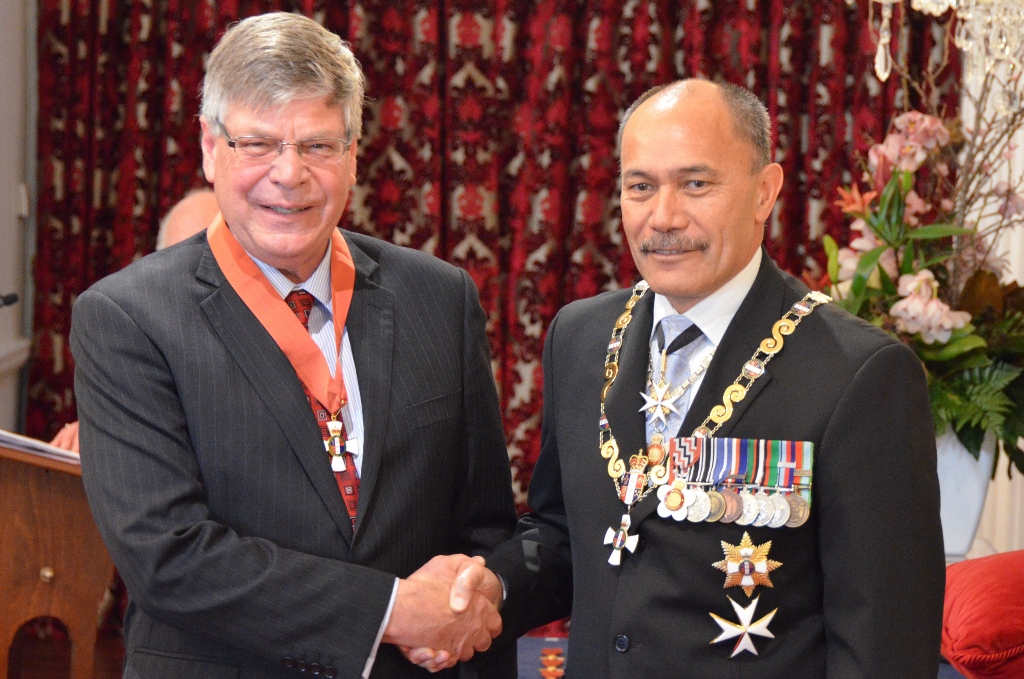
Tucker (left) in 2014, after his investiture as a Companion of the New Zealand Order of Merit by the governor-general, Sir Jerry Mateparae

Warren Henry Tucker CNZM (born 18 August 1950) is a retired New Zealand intelligence officer. He was the director of the Security Intelligence Service from 2006 to 2014.

== Biography ==
Born in 1950, Tucker was educated at Nelson College from 1964 to 1968. He went on to become an officer in the New Zealand Army, holding the rank of Major in the Royal New Zealand Signals Corps.

He has a doctorate in electrical engineering from the University of Canterbury, and later joined the Government Communications Security Bureau (GCSB), New Zealand's primary signals intelligence agency. He became head of communications security in 1982, and in 1983, he was appointed Director of Policy and Plans. From 1984 to 1989, he was the GCSB's liaison officer to the NSA in Washington. On his return, he became Director of Operations (effectively deputy director of the GCSB), and in 1996, he became the Intelligence Co-ordinator in the office of the Prime Minister. He became the third director of the GCSB in 1999, replacing Ray Parker. In 2006, it was announced that he would succeed Richard Woods as director of another New Zealand intelligence agency, the Security Intelligence Service, on 1 November.

On 1 November 2010, Tucker was reappointed for a further two-year term as Director. He retired in May 2014 with Rebecca Kitteridge taking over his role. In the 2014 Queen's Birthday Honours, Tucker was appointed a Companion of the New Zealand Order of Merit, for services to the State.

In November 2014 the Gwyn Report on the SIS criticised the actions in 2011 of the SIS and retired director Tucker over whether opposition leader Phil Goff had received a SIS briefing.
