= Mass surveillance in New Zealand =

There is an estimated 400,000 privately owned and 10,000 publicly owned security cameras in New Zealand. They are primarily used for security, but are also used for monitoring traffic, weather, dumping, and parking, among others. Taxpayers pay approximately $5.4 million per year on the running costs of security cameras, and for the five years prior to 2022, spent $29.8 million on installation costs. At least three councils use facial recognition. The police have access to over 5,000 cameras owned by businesses, councils and government agencies, which can be accessed by 4,000 police officers on their smartphones. The New Zealand Security Intelligence Service is responsible for human intelligence collection in New Zealand.

In 2022 RNZ sent out over 100 Official Information Act requests in an attempt to map the amount of security cameras throughout the country. CCTV cameras have been criticised following research suggesting that they do not lower rates of crime. There is also use of artificial intelligence within the CCTV networks of New Zealand.

== History ==
Since 2014 the police have worked with SaferCities to develop its vGRID platform. As of September 2022, this consists of 4947 cameras in 246 sites, which can be accessed on the smartphones of 4,000 police officers.

During the 2020 COVID-19 pandemic, police falsely reported cars as stolen in order to track car movement which breached lockdown rules.

In 2020, the New Zealand Police conducted a trial of the facial recognition software controversial Clearview AI without consulting the privacy commissioner. The software has been criticised for not performing well for Māori and Pasifika ethnicities.

During the COVID-19 pandemic in 2020, despite urges from the government to wear face masks, a New World supermarket told customers to remove their face masks so that the cameras could recognise their faces.

In January 2023, the Central Otago District Council issued a new blanket policy for the council's cameras exclusively, requiring the cameras to have a 'clear business purpose'. The same year, a Pak'nSave store in Tauranga started trialling body cameras due to rising levels of retail crime.

=== China controversy ===
In August 2022, the Ministry of Business, Innovation and Employment (MBIE) said that they would stop purchasing surveillance equipment from Chinese security camera manufacturer, Hikvision, citing human rights violations of the Chinese government. There are over 3000 Hikvision and Dahua—another Chinese manufacturer who have been criticised—cameras installed at councils. The government has not issued a ban on Chinese surveillance cameras. Countries such as Australia, the United Kingdom and United States have issued bans. They have been used in New Zealand since 2018.

The Tauranga City Council have over 700 of these cameras, Auckland Transport have 'hundreds', Rotorua Lakes Council have 106, Waka Kotahi have 18, the Department of Conservation have 60, and the Police have approximately 60. Their cameras, have also been found in government buildings and a member of parliament's house. New Zealand Police, Oranga Tamariki and the Ministry of Social development, who have the cameras, have said that they are not connected to the network and are being phased out.

After The Herald and Newstalk ZB made reports about the concerns of these cameras, Beijing's representatives in New Zealand accused the two of having a "cold-war mentality", accusing "forces" of "deliberately launching a propaganda campaign against China in countries including New Zealand, with the sole purpose of smearing and discrediting China to serve the short-sighted and narrow interests of that certain country, or to put it bluntly, to serve the hegemony of that country"

In 2023 the National and Act parties have expressed a desire to have an audit of these cameras on 'sensitive' buildings. Intelligence Agencies Minister Andrew Little said that he is unlikely to do an audit of government buildings.

== Locations ==
=== Auckland ===
Auckland Transport and the Auckland Council operate a combined total of 5,685 security cameras as of April 2022.

=== Wellington ===
In 2023, new digital billboards in Wellington were installed which have cameras inside them. The council said that they will not be activated.

=== Invercargill ===
Invercargill's CCTV system was installed in 2005, funded by the council. It is monitored and operated by police. An investigation found that one out of nine inner-city cameras were functional, and the quality was so bad that only 5% of investigations had a success. In 2023, the Invercargill City Council started the placement of 133 new cameras throughout Invercargill and Bluff. These cameras are to have number plate recognition, and are expected to be operated by the council rather than the police.

=== Otago ===
As of January 2023, the Central Otago District Council has six CCTV cameras.

=== Palmerston North ===
In 2023, the Palmerston North City Council increased their network from 27 to 124 cameras after a rise in vandalism and destructive behaviour.

=== Queenstown ===
In 2022, the cameras of a former prohibited carpark were accidentally re-activated, causing people to receive infringement notices in the mail despite the carpark being free to use.

=== Kāpiti Coast District ===
As of September 2022, the Kāpiti Coast District Council maintain 124 CCTV cameras.

=== Waipā District ===
In 2022 it was announced that the Waipa District Council were adding 25 new CCTV cameras. Instead of waiting for government funding, they funded it themselves, costing them $500,000. There are currently 13 CCTV cameras.

=== Schools ===
On 10 October 2023 the Privacy Commission said that the number of requests to include CCTV cameras in school bathrooms had increased, to prevent bullying and vaping. The privacy commission said that schools must take the issue seriously, saying that "bathrooms are highly sensitive zones for privacy". Senior law lecturer Nikki Chamberlain said that placing cameras in bathrooms may not be "fair or reasonable", recommending that schools face the cameras outside of bathrooms rather than into them.

== Organisations ==
The Ministry of Social Development have over 3,000 indoor and outdoor cameras, and Waka Kotahi operates over 1,600. According to RNZ, New Zealand Police operate only 45 cameras.

== See also ==
- Privacy Act 2020
- Privacy Commissioner
