= Bill Gilbert (intelligence service director) =

Sir William Gilbert KBE, DSO

Director New Zealand Security Intelligence Service
- In office 28 November 1956 – July 1976
- Succeeded by: Paul Molineaux

Personal details
- Born: Herbert Ellery Gilbert; 20 July 1916 Wanganui, New Zealand
- Died: 26 September 1987 (aged 71) Silverstream, New Zealand
- Spouse: Patricia Caroline Anson Gilbert (née Farrer)
- Education: Royal Military College, Duntroon

Military service
- Allegiance: New Zealand
- Branch/service: New Zealand Army
- Years of service: 1935–1956
- Rank: Brigadier
- Commands: 6th Field Regiment
- Battles/wars: Second World War; North African Campaign; Siege of Tobruk; Battle of Medenine; Italian Campaign; Battle of Monte Cassino
- Awards: Knight Commander of the Order of the British Empire; Distinguished Service Order; Mentioned in Despatches; Bronze Star (United States)

Sir William Herbert Ellery Gilbert, KBE, DSO (born Herbert Ellery Gilbert; 20 July 1916 – 26 September 1987), was a New Zealand military leader and intelligence service director.

Gilbert was born in Wanganui on 20 July 1916. In 1953, he was awarded the Queen Elizabeth II Coronation Medal. In 1956, he was tasked by Jack Marshall, then Minister of Justice, with setting up the New Zealand Security Service. Over 19 years, he served under seven Prime Ministers. He was appointed Knight Commander of the Order of the British Empire (KBE) in the 1976 Queen's Birthday Honours, just one month prior to his retirement.

He was born as Herbert Ellery Gilbert. At the Australian Royal Military College in Duntroon he was nicknamed Bill, and the name stuck. After his retirement, he changed his name by deed poll to William Herbert Ellery Gilbert.
