= Department of Trade and Industry (New Zealand) =

Former New Zealand government department

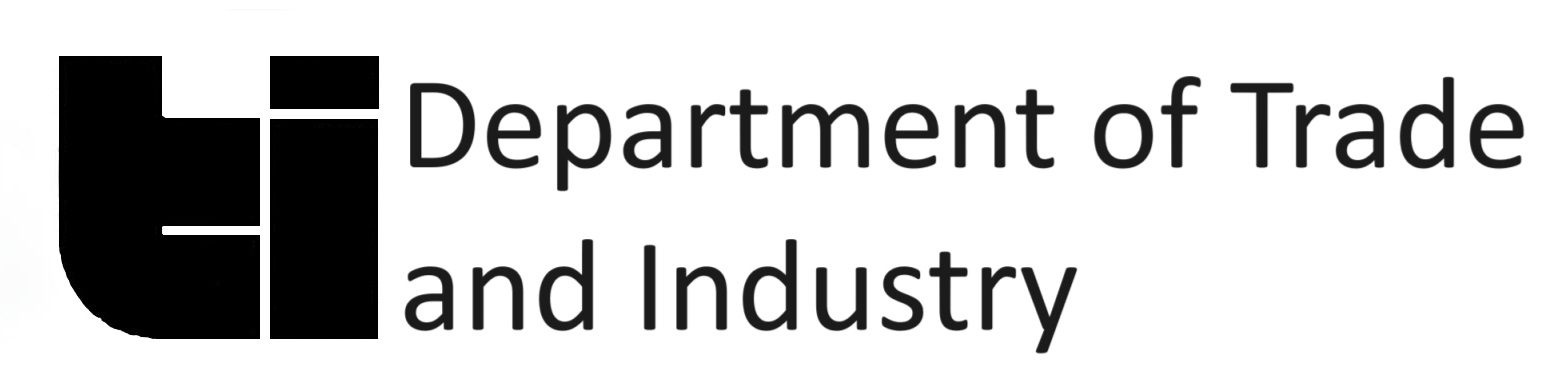

Agency overview
- Formed: 24 October 1972
- Preceding agency: Department of Industries and Commerce
- Dissolved: 1 December 1988
- Superseding agency: Ministry of Commerce
- Minister responsible: Minister of Trade and Industry

The Department of Trade and Industry was a government department in New Zealand that assisted with the export of goods to overseas markets, examined trade practices and administered industrial manufacturing.

== History ==
=== Establishment ===
In October 1972 the department was created from the Department of Industries and Commerce after the passing of the Trade and Industry Amendment Act, 1972.

=== Functions and responsibilities ===
The department had the task of administering import licensing as well as aiding with the development of local industries and businesses via government intervention, incentives and support. By the mid-1980s the government committed to phasing out such assistance and ending import licensing. In February 1988 a proposal to dismantle the department was raised in the Cabinet.

=== Disestablishment ===
The department was disestablished in 1988 with responsibility for industrial development shifting to the newly created Ministry of Commerce while overseas trade development was taken over by the Ministry of External Relations and Trade. The Ministry of Commerce came into existence on 1 December 1988.
