= Foreign espionage in New Zealand =

Espionage activities in New Zealand by foreign entities

Foreign espionage in New Zealand, while likely not as extensive as in many larger countries, has nevertheless taken place. The New Zealand Security Intelligence Service (NZSIS), which has primary responsibility for counter-intelligence work, states that there are foreign intelligence agents working in New Zealand today.

== Potential objectives ==
New Zealand's relatively small population, economy, and military mean that espionage against New Zealand is unlikely to be a priority for foreign intelligence agencies. Nevertheless, the New Zealand government asserts that a limited amount of espionage does take place. Former Prime Minister Sir Geoffrey Palmer has stated that "it would be wrong to assume New Zealand was free from foreign threats [or] that New Zealand may be too small and unimportant to be of great interest to hostile foreign-intelligence organisations".

One potential reason for foreign interest in New Zealand might be its close intelligence links with larger Western nations – as part of the Five Eyes alliance, New Zealand receives more information than it might otherwise be expected to hold. Foreign intelligence agencies might therefore see New Zealand as a "back door" into the intelligence worlds of the United States, United Kingdom, and Australia. At times, New Zealand's allies have expressed concerns about both Soviet and Chinese espionage and influence in New Zealand.

Also of potential interest was New Zealand's nuclear-free legislation, which prompted a rift between New Zealand and the United States. Soviet defector Oleg Gordievsky alleges that the Soviet Union was interested in New Zealand's policy, and attempted to promote it in Europe, perhaps in the hope of weakening the United States' position in the Cold War nuclear arms race. The Soviet Union was frequently accused of encouraging those elements in New Zealand which it saw as beneficial to its interests – the pro-Soviet Socialist Unity Party was one alleged beneficiary, as were certain militant trade unions.

On occasion, foreign spies may be active in New Zealand for reasons not connected with the country itself – the French bombing of the Rainbow Warrior was aimed at Greenpeace rather than New Zealand. China is also sometimes alleged to target New Zealand-based Chinese democracy activists and Falun Gong members more often than it targets the New Zealand government.

It is alleged that New Zealand has been used as a "training ground" for other operations – it is a developed, English-speaking country, but was seen as less dangerous than more major targets.

== Activity ==
=== Soviet Union/Russian Federation ===
Throughout the Cold War, a number of people in New Zealand, both Soviet citizens and New Zealanders, were accused of working for Soviet intelligence agencies. Many were diplomats connected to the Soviet embassy in Wellington. The SIS was active in monitoring the activities of Soviet diplomatic personnel, conducting surveillance of the embassy compound and trailing vehicles which left it. Occasionally, diplomats were expelled on charges of espionage or interference in New Zealand political affairs.

Among the expelled diplomats were Ambassador Vsevolod Sofinsky and embassy officials Sergei Budnik and Dmitri Razgovorov. Sofinsky and Budnik were both accused in the 1980s of giving covert assistance to the Socialist Unity Party, while Razgovorov was accused in 1975 of being an agent handler for local sources. Later, in 1991, Anvar Kadyrov was expelled after illegally attempting to obtain a New Zealand passport. The "Mitrokhin Archive" claims that many Soviet spies were active in New Zealand, possibly using it as a relatively "safe" training ground for activities in other English-speaking countries.

Probably the best known New Zealander accused of being a foreign spy is Bill Sutch, a prominent diplomat and economic advisor. He was observed on several occasions meeting Dmitri Razgovorov, a Soviet diplomat, and in 1974, the SIS accused Sutch of passing information. He was acquitted in court the following year, and died shortly afterwards. The question of his guilt or innocence was, and still continues to be, a matter of considerable public debate. Former NZSIS officer Kit Bennetts has maintained that Sutch was a Soviet intelligence asset.

Another New Zealander accused of working for the Soviets was Paddy Costello, a senior diplomat – information from the Mitrokhin papers is the primary source of the allegations. He is sometimes cited as the reason Morris and Lona Cohen, both Soviet spies, were able to obtain New Zealand passports, although others claim the passports could easily have been obtained without assistance. These accusations have been challenged by author James McNeish in The Sixth Man: The Extraordinary Life of Paddy Costello.

In August 2023, an unclassified NZSIS threat assessment identified Russia as one of the three foreign state actors alongside China and Iran most responsible for foreign interference in New Zealand. According to the report, Russia spread disinformation among some New Zealanders through its international disinformation campaigns and sought to acquire new technologies in order to circumvent international sanctions imposed after the 2022 Russian invasion of Ukraine.

=== China ===
According to the NZSIS, China is the only country it has detected conducting espionage against New Zealand "at scale."

Chen Yonglin and Hao Fengjun, two former diplomats of the People's Republic of China who defected to Australia, have claimed that China undertakes substantial espionage work in New Zealand. The New Zealand government declined to comment, and the Chinese government denied the claims.

In September 2017, the University of Canterbury political scientist Anne-Marie Brady alleged that the Chinese Communist Party was working with sympathetic elements within the Chinese diaspora community organisations and ethnic media including the New Zealand China Friendship Society and local chapters of the Chinese Students and Scholars Association as part of a united front strategy to advance Chinese "soft power" interests in New Zealand. Brady also alleged that National Party Member of Parliament (MP) Jian Yang and Labour Party MP Raymond Huo worked as pro-China influencers. Yang attracted media attention and scrutiny over allegations that he trained Chinese intelligence officers while teaching at the Chinese Air Force Engineering College and the Luoyang People's Liberation Army University of Foreign Languages. Huo and Yang subsequently resigned prior to the 2020 New Zealand general election after intelligence agencies raised concerns about the two MPs' connections to the Chinese Government with Prime Minister Jacinda Ardern and the-then National Party leader Todd Muller.

In November 2020, reporting by The New Zealand Herald revealed an individual known as "Mr H" who been sent to New Zealand in 1996 by Chinese public security bureau authorities to monitor Taiwanese and Falun Gong dissidents had failed to gain residency after having his application rejected after continuous attempts at gaining permanent residency for the past 23 years.

In mid September 2020, the NZSIS confirmed that it was evaluating the "potential risks and security concerns" of the Chinese intelligence firm Zhenhua Data's "Overseas Key Individuals Database." The database had profiles on 730 New Zealanders including Prime Minister Ardern's mother Laurell, father Ross, sister Louse, several Cabinet ministers, former Prime Minister John Key's son Max, sportswoman Barbara Kendall, Māori leader Dame Naida Glavish, former Minister of Finance Ruth Richardson, and Chief Censor David Shanks. Zhenhua's database had been leaked to the American academic and China expert Professor Chris Balding, who passed the information to Australian cyber security firm Internet 2.0. The data leak was covered by several international media including the Australian Financial Review, the Washington Post, the Indian Express, the Globe and Mail, and Il Foglio.

In late March 2021, NZSIS Director-General Rebecca Kitteridge confirmed that its agents had discovered a New Zealander who was gathering information for an unidentified foreign intelligence agency about individuals whom an unidentified foreign state regards as dissidents. Brady claimed that the spy had been working for China, stating that "foreign interference in New Zealand almost always means the activities of the Chinese Communist Party (CCP)."

In June 2021, Brady along with the University of Auckland political scientist Stephen Noakes and the Victoria University of Wellington historian Catherine Churchman alleged that the Chinese government was spying on their lectures, by sending individuals to attend, photograph and film lectures. The Chinese Embassy dismissed claims that it was sending spies to infiltrate universities as "pure hearsay" while the Minister for Education Chris Hipkins advised universities and lecturers to inform the NZSIS if they have any concerns about espionage in their lecture halls.

On 20 July 2021, Andrew Little, the Minister in charge of the Government Communications Security Bureau (GCSB), confirmed that the signals intelligence agency had established links between Chinese state-sponsored actors known as "Advanced Persistent Threat 40" (APT40) and malicious cyber activity in New Zealand. New Zealand joined the United States, United Kingdom, Australia and the European Union in condemning the Chinese Ministry of State Security and other Chinese state-sponsored actors for their involvement in the 2021 Microsoft Exchange Server data breach. In response, the Chinese Embassy in New Zealand lodged a "solemn representation" with the New Zealand Government. The following day, Foreign Minister Nanaia Mahuta confirmed that Ministry of Foreign Affairs and Trade (MFAT) officials had met with Chinese Embassy officials in response to the cyber attack allegations.

In late October 2021, Immigration New Zealand denied a Chinese couple's residency application after the NZSIS designated them as a threat to national security due to their links to Chinese intelligence services. The NZSIS asserted that the husband and wife had "almost certainly" assisted Chinese intelligence services namely, China's Ministry of State Security (MSS) and deliberately concealed the amount of contact they had maintained with them. The couple had migrated to New Zealand in 2016 under the entrepreneur work visa scheme and established a business. The husband's lawyer stated that the man had maintained legitimate contact with Chinese intelligence services while working at a private company in China because he had helped employees to obtain visas to enter China for business purposes.

In October 2022, the NZSIS detained and questioned a Chinese New Zealander named Yuan Zhao, who worked as a senior government analyst for the Public Service Commission (PSC), on suspicion of using his position to spy for the Chinese Government and because of his "close personal relationships" with Chinese diplomats based in New Zealand. Zhao was subsequently suspended from his job at the Commission in late 2022. In March 2023, Zhao denied supplying the Chinese Government with information and claimed the NZSIS had no evidence to substantiate the information. In response, the NZSIS and PSC declined to comment on Zhao's case, citing security protocols. Yuan subsequently complained to the intelligence agency's watchdog, the Inspector-General of Intelligence and Security Brendan Horsley, who confirmed his office was investigating Zhao's complaint. In response, the Chinese Embassy described the espionage allegations against Zhao as "ill-founded" and motivated by an "ulterior motive to smear and attack China, which we firmly oppose."

In August 2023, the NZSIS published a threat assessment which identified China, Iran, and Russia as the foreign governments most responsible for foreign interference in New Zealand. According to the report, Chinese intelligence services were actively targeting ethnic Chinese communities in New Zealand.

In July 2024, Christopher Luxon stated that he would publicly disclose cases of Chinese espionage in the country as part of a strategy to boost awareness of the security threat. In September 2024, NZSIS stated in its second annual threat report that "China remains a complex intelligence concern." The report also noted that China uses professional social network websites such as LinkedIn for intelligence gathering.

On 21 August 2025, the NZSIS' third threat assessment expressed concern about Chinese united front activities, which included using co-optees or proxies to carry out online and physical surveillance activities such as monitoring social media, photographing individuals, collecting information and taking control of community organisations. The NZSIS report also warned local councils that sister city relationships could be exploited for "foreign interference" activities. In response, local Chinese community leaders including Richard Leung and New Zealand Chinese Association president Paul Chin welcomed the NZSIS report but warned that it should not be used to stigmatise Chinese New Zealanders. The Chinese Embassy denounced the report, claiming it was "rife with unfounded speculation, distortion of facts, and baseless accusations against China". University of Canterbury political scientist Dr Anne-Marie Brady welcomed the report for highlighting the national and external security threats facing New Zealand.

On 4 June 2026, the NZSIS and its Five Eyes partners issued a joint warning that Chinese military intelligence operatives had been using job websites such as LinkedIn to trick people with access to national security clearances into divulging classified government and military information. Chinese military intelligence allegedly used an "aggressive online recruitment strategy" which involved advertising fake freelance foreign policy and defence analyst jobs, and then coercing successful candidates into providing sensitive information. NZSIS director general Andrew Hampton confirmed that his agency had investigated several cases in the last three to four years, and had prevented sensitive information from being passed over. On 5 June, the Chinese Embassy to New Zealand issued a statement denying that the Chinese military had been trying to extract intelligence from New Zealanders, describing the alliance's warning as a "fabricated" smear campaign against China. The Embassy statement also warned New Zealand to refrain from "blindly following its security partners." The Chinese Foreign Ministry spokesperson Mao Ning also denied the allegations, countering that the Five Eyes engaged in "massive systematic espionage" worldwide.

In August 2026, it was reported that the NZSIS disrupted a plan by Purple Mountain Observatory to install ground-based space infrastructure that could collect intelligence of military value.

=== Other countries ===
In 1982, a group of exiled Albanians living in New Zealand, Italy, and the US attempted to infiltrate the Iron Curtain country of Albania. Their purpose was to assassinate the leader Enver Hoxha, and start a civil revolution from inside Albania. It has been said that the Central Intelligence Agency (CIA) were financing the operation, as part of their undermining of the communist regime. From all accounts the mission was discovered by Albanian forces and all of the participants were killed in a fierce machine gun battle. The Prime Minister Robert Muldoon was questioned by the media when the story leaked that New Zealand citizens were involved. The story was quickly given a media gag by the government, NZSIS and police.

In 1985, agents of the DGSE, the primary foreign intelligence agency of France, bombed the Greenpeace vessel Rainbow Warrior in Auckland harbour. Most of the crew evacuated, but one person was killed. Two of the agents were captured, pleaded guilty, and were sentenced to prison. This remains the most well known incident of foreign spies working in New Zealand, and the only terrorist attack committed in New Zealand by a foreign government.

In 2004, two Israeli citizens pleaded guilty to an illegal attempt to acquire a New Zealand passport, in a case similar to that of the Soviet Anvar Kadyrov. They were fined, given a short prison sentence, and finally deported. The government has claimed that the men were Mossad agents, although the Israeli government has not officially confirmed this. (A statement in 2005 appeared to contain a confirmation, but the Israeli government later said this was a misunderstanding).

In December 2010, leaked US diplomatic cables indicated senior New Zealand Defence Ministry officials had been spying for the United States, secretly briefing the United States embassy on Cabinet discussions about the Iraq War.

On 25 November 2020, the New Zealand Defence Force announced it was charging a soldier with seventeen offences, including four counts of espionage and two counts of attempted espionage. The Linton–based soldier is a member of white nationalist group Action Zealandia, and expressed support for the Christchurch mosque shooter. He is the first New Zealand resident to be charged with espionage. On 18 August 2025, the soldier pleaded guilty at a court martial to attempted espionage on behalf of a foreign power; the first successful conviction for such a crime in New Zealand. The defendant admitted providing classified information including the telephone directories of several army camps and access codes to Linton Military Camp and the nearby RNZAF Base Ohakea to an undercover New Zealand agent, posing as a foreign spy. On 20 August, the soldier was sentenced to two years' imprisonment for attempted espionage. In early October 2026, the Court of Appeal of New Zealand lifted name suppression for the former soldier, who was identified as Jack Captein.

In August 2023, the NZSIS also reported that Iranian state actors were monitoring and reporting on Iranian diaspora communities and dissident groups in New Zealand.

== See also ==
- Espionage
- New Zealand intelligence agencies
- Foreign espionage in Australia
- 2025 New Zealand espionage case
