= New Zealand Customs Service =

State sector organisation in New Zealand

New Zealand Customs Service Te Mana Ārai O Aotearoa (Māori)

Agency overview
- Formed: 1840
- Employees: Approx 1,569
- Annual budget: Vote Customs; Total budget for 2022/23 ▲$299,111,000

Jurisdictional structure
- Operations jurisdiction: New Zealand
- Governing body: New Zealand Government
- Constituting instrument: Customs and Excise Act 2018

Operational structure
- Headquarters: The Customhouse, 1 Hinemoa St, Harbour Quays, Wellington
- Minister responsible: Casey Costello, Minister of Customs
- Agency executive: Christine Stevenson, Chief Executive and Comptroller of Customs

Facilities
- Stations: 23

Website
- www.customs.govt.nz

The New Zealand Customs Service (Customs, Māori: Te Mana Ārai o Aotearoa) is a state sector organisation and law enforcement agency in New Zealand whose role is to provide border control and protect the community from potential risks arising from international trade and travel, as well as collecting duties and taxes on imports to the country.

== History ==
Customs is the oldest government department in New Zealand. Formed on 5 January 1840, it pre-dates the signing of the Treaty of Waitangi by one month. Its early establishment was necessary to collect revenue for the fledgling government, and over the years duties, tariffs and taxes collected by Customs have remained a major source of revenue for the country, although customs has also been used to impose various control over the movement of people and the distribution of particular products, in particular alcohol and tobacco.

In 1996, the New Zealand Customs Department was renamed the New Zealand Customs Service. In recent years, they have modernized itself to keep pace with new technologies and the ever-increasing volumes of international passengers and trade, while balancing its law enforcement and compliance obligations. Staffing levels sit between 1300 and 1500 nationally, with its head office located in Wellington.

In May 2025, Customs Minister Casey Costello announced that the New Zealand Government would allocate funds from the 2025 New Zealand budget to create a new overseas-based officer to assist with investigations and information sharing.

== Responsibilities ==
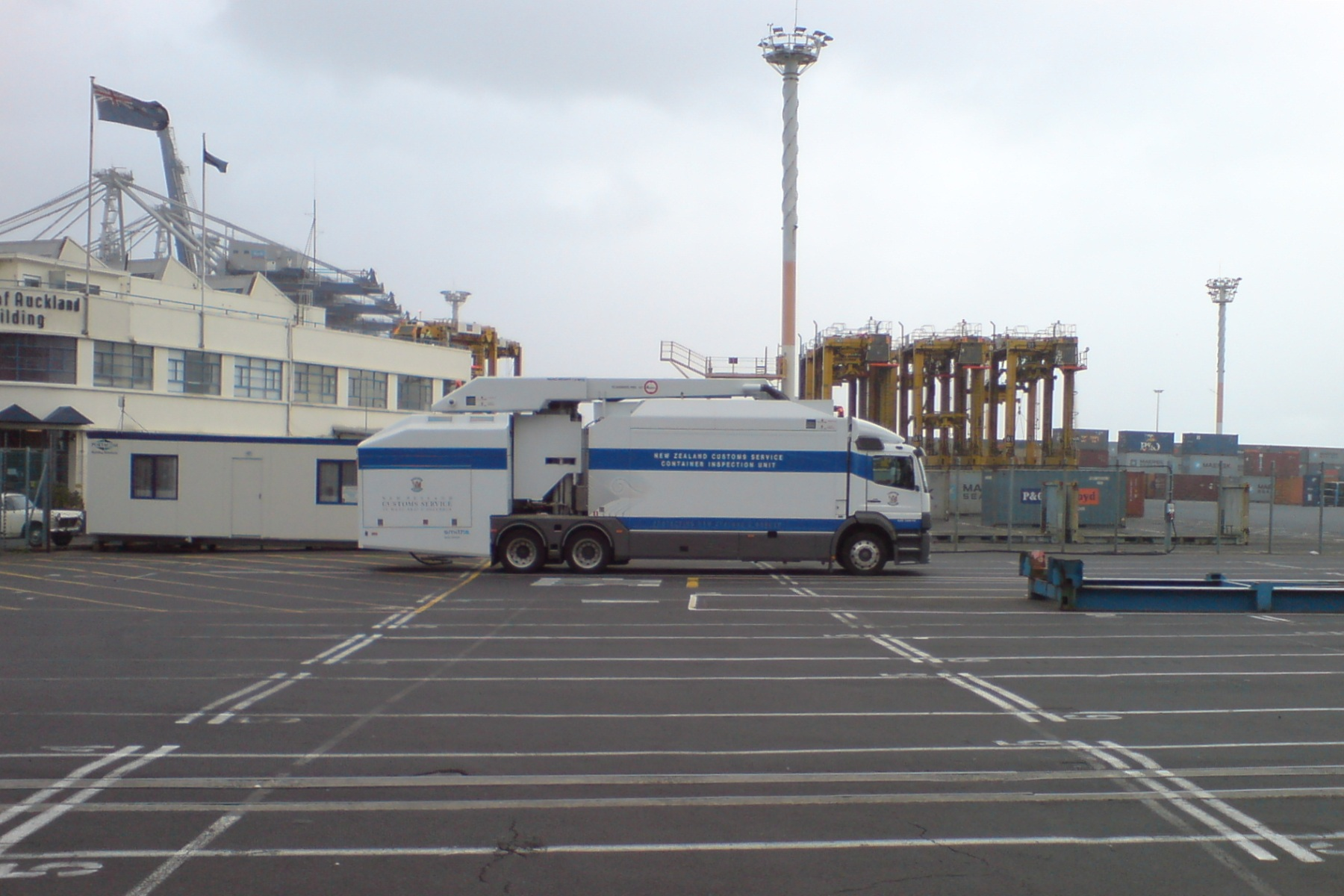
A container x-ray inspection unit at Ports of Auckland.

Customs is a law enforcement agency in its own right, and is responsible for intercepting contraband and checking international travelers and their baggage, as well as cargo and mail, for banned or prohibited items. Contrary to popular belief, it is not responsible for biosecurity items such as food and other agricultural items declared at ports of entry - this is the responsibility of the Ministry for Primary Industries. Customs is also responsible for assessing and collecting Customs duties, excise taxes and Goods and Services Tax on imports and protecting New Zealand businesses against illegal trade. It is second only to the Inland Revenue Department for the amount of revenue it collects for the New Zealand Government. It exercises controls over restricted and prohibited imports and exports, including objectionable material (such as child sex abuse images), drugs, firearms and hazardous waste and also collects import and export data.

Customs is responsible for documentation of all imports and exports (in 2006/7 this was 47 million imports and 33 million exports). Since 1999, all documentation to Customs has been electronic. They also closely work with New Zealand's other border agencies, the Ministry for Primary Industries, the Aviation Security Service (AvSec) and Immigration New Zealand. It also works very closely with the New Zealand Police and the Organised and Financial Crime Agency of New Zealand in joint operations involving the importation of drugs, and with the Department of Conservation on the management of items that are subject to CITES.

Customs established the Trade Single Window in 2013 to provide a single place to lodge import and export documents with the New Zealand Government. Whilst an unarmed agency, some Customs officers are authorized to carry handcuffs. All officers can make arrests in relation to offences relating to the importation of drugs and other prohibited goods.

== Rank badges ==
New Zealand Customs Service										
New Zealand Customs Service	Comptroller	Deputy; Comptroller	Assistant Comptroller	Manager	Operations Manager	Chief Customs Officer	Supervising Customs Officer OR Customs Technical Specialist	Senior Customs Officer	Customs Officer	Assistant Customs Officer

== Chief executive ==
Chief Executive and Comptroller of New Zealand Customs Service
- Incumbent; Christine Stevenson since 1 January 2019
- Reports to: Minister of Customs
- Appointer: Public Service Commissioner
- Constituting instrument: Customs and Excise Act 2018
- Inaugural holder: George Cooper
- Formation: 1840

The highest-ranked officer and chief executive is formally titled the Chief Executive and Comptroller of the New Zealand Customs Service. They are appointed by the Public Service Commissioner, after approval by the Governor-General of New Zealand and recommendation from the Minister for the Public Service The first holder of the office was George Cooper, appointed in 1840 after travelling from New South Wales with William Hobson. The current officeholder is Christine Stevenson, appointed on 1 January 2019.

== Office locations ==
Customs officers are based at the main cities in New Zealand, as well as several smaller ports. Its headquarters is in Wellington, New Zealand's capital city. Customs also has liaison officers based at the following overseas locations: Bangkok, Beijing, Brussels, Canberra, Hong Kong, Jakarta, London, Los Angeles and Washington D.C.
