= New Zealand Security Intelligence Service =

National intelligence agency of New Zealand

- Te Pā Whakamarumaru

Agency overview
- Formed: 1956
- Headquarters: Pipitea House, 1–15 Pipitea Street, Wellington, New Zealand; 41.276823°S 174.779439°E
- Employees: 300
- Annual budget: Total budget for 2024/25; Vote Security Intelligence ▲$122,834,000 NZD
- Minister responsible: Hon Paul Goldsmith, Minister Responsible for the NZSIS
- Agency executive: Andrew Hampton, Director-General of Security
- Website: nzsis.govt.nz

The New Zealand Security Intelligence Service (NZSIS; Māori: Te Pā Whakamarumaru) is New Zealand's primary national intelligence agency. It is responsible for providing information and advising on matters including national security (including counterterrorism and counterintelligence) and foreign intelligence. It is headquartered in Wellington and overseen by a Director-General, the Minister of New Zealand Security Intelligence Service, and the parliamentary intelligence and security committee; independent oversight is provided by the Inspector-General of Intelligence and Security.

SIS was established on 28 November 1956 with the primary function of combating perceived increases in Soviet intelligence operations in Australia and New Zealand. Since then, its legislated powers have expanded to increase its monitoring capabilities and include entry into private property. Its role has also expanded to include countering domestic and international terrorism, chemical, biological, and cyber threats.

The organisation has been criticised for its role in numerous high-profile incidents such as the 1974 arrest of Bill Sutch on charges of spying for the Soviet Union, the 1981 assassination attempt by Christopher Lewis on Queen Elizabeth II, and the 1996 invasion of GATT Watchdog organiser Aziz Choudry's home. It has also been criticised for its failures to anticipate or prevent incidents such as the 1985 bombing of the Rainbow Warrior, the 2004 purchasing of New Zealand passports by Israeli "intelligence contract assets", and the 2019 Christchurch mosque shootings by an Australian alt-right white supremacist terrorist.

== History ==
=== Origins and predecessors ===
In the first half of the 20th century, domestic intelligence and counter-subversion were primarily in the hands of the New Zealand Police Force (1919–1941; 1945–1949) and the New Zealand Police Force Special Branch (1949–1956). During the Second World War, the short-lived New Zealand Security Intelligence Bureau (SIB) took over. The SIB was modeled after the British MI5 and was headed by Major Kenneth Folkes, a junior MI5 officer. However, the conman Syd Ross duped Major Folkes into believing that there was a Nazi plot in New Zealand. After this embarrassment, Prime Minister Peter Fraser dismissed Folkes in February 1943 and the SIB merged into the New Zealand Police. Following the end of the war in 1945, the police force resumed responsibility for domestic intelligence.

On 28 November 1956, the First National Government established the New Zealand Security Service (NZSS). Its goal was to counter increased Soviet intelligence operations in Australia and New Zealand in the wake of the Petrov Affair of 1954, which had damaged Soviet-Australian relations. The NZSS was again modeled on the British domestic intelligence agency MI5 and its first Director of Security, Brigadier William Gilbert, was a former New Zealand Army officer. Its existence remained a state secret until 1960.

=== Formalisation and expansion of mandate ===
The NZ Intelligence Community (NZIC) developed further in the late 1950s due to growing concerns about political terrorism, improvements in weaponry, news media coverage, and frequent air travel. As terrorist threats grew, along with potential connections to wider groups, the adoption of counter-insurgency techniques increased in New Zealand. In response to this, the New Zealand Parliament enacted the 1961 Crimes Act to allow improved targeting of possible terrorist suspects and scenarios. In 1969 the NZSS was formally renamed the New Zealand Security Intelligence Service. That same year Parliament passed the New Zealand Security Intelligence Service Act to cover the agency's functions and responsibilities.

Various amendments were later made to the Security Intelligence Act, including the controversial 1977 amendment under Prime Minister Robert Muldoon, which expanded the SIS's powers of monitoring considerably. The 1977 Amendment Act defined terrorism as: "planning, threatening, using or attempting to use violence to coerce, deter, or intimidate". The Immigration Amendment Act of 1978 further expanded the definition of terrorism.

In 1987, Gerald Hensley, Chair of the NZIC, stated that the State Services Commission became attracted to the concept of "comprehensive security", taking into account not only human-made threats such as terrorism but also natural hazards. This was also a response to the severing of intelligence-sharing arrangements New Zealand had with the United States in 1985 over nuclear policy. Following the attempted hijacking of an Air New Zealand flight and the bombing of the Rainbow Warrior in 1985, Parliament enacted the International Terrorism (Emergency Powers) Act 1987. The Act gave censorship powers to the government around matters of national security and terrorism. This was a significant departure from New Zealand's previous conformance to international norms and laws.

At the end of the 20th Century and beginning of the 21st, the NZIC adapted to emerging chemical, biological, and eventually cyber threats. These three areas became a key point of integration between the intelligence community agencies. Cases of terrorism overseas promoted the NZ Intelligence Community to regularly exchange information and meet the growing demands of addressing non-state actors.

== Purpose ==
The SIS is a civilian intelligence and security organisation. Its stated roles are:

- To investigate threats to security and to work with other agencies within Government, so that the intelligence it collects is appropriately used and threats which have been identified are disrupted
- To collect foreign intelligence
- To provide a range of protective security advice and services to Government.

As a civilian organisation, the SIS's remit does not include enforcement (although it has limited powers to intercept communications and search residences). Its role is intended to be advisory, providing the government with information on threats to national security or national interests. It also advises other government agencies about their own internal security measures, and is responsible for performing checks on government employees who require security clearance. The SIS is responsible for most of the government's counter-intelligence work.

In 2007, it was reported that the SIS wished to expand its role into fighting organized crime.

== Organisation ==
The SIS is based in Wellington, with branches in Auckland and Christchurch. It has close to 300 full-time staff.

The Director-General of the SIS reports to the minister of New Zealand Security Intelligence Service. Independent oversight of its activities is provided by the Inspector-General of Intelligence and Security.

== Directors ==
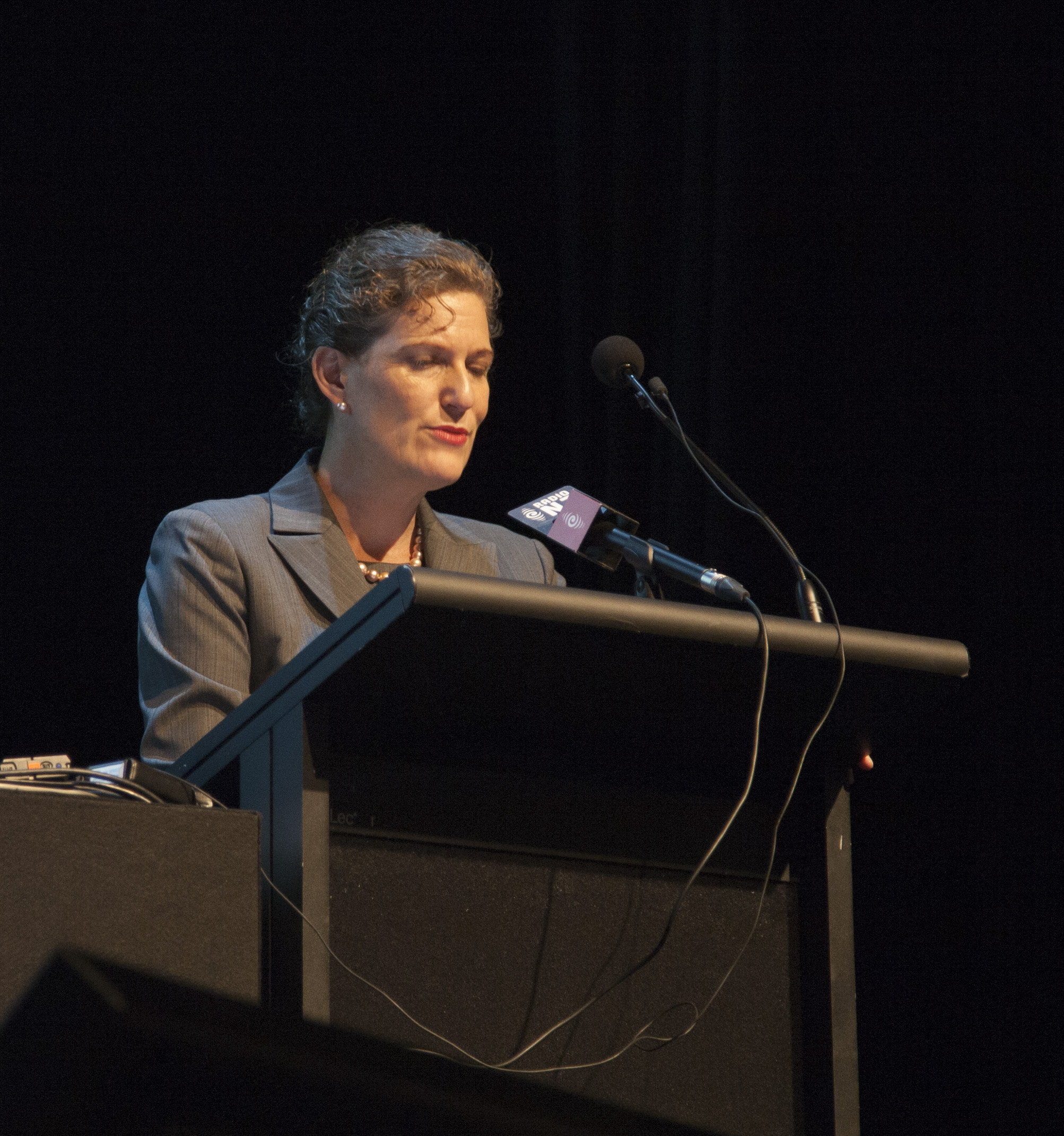
Rebecca Kitteridge in 2015

The SIS is administered by a Director-General. As of 2024, it has had eight directors general:

- Brigadier Sir William Gilbert KBE DSO (1956–1976)
- Judge Paul Molineaux CMG (1976–1983)
- Brigadier Lindsay Smith CMG CBE (1983–1991)
- Lieutenant General Don McIver CMG OBE (1991–1999)
- Richard Woods (1999–2006)
- Warren Tucker (2006–2014)
- Rebecca Kitteridge CVO (2014–2023)
- Andrew Hampton (2023–Present)

== Public profile ==
The SIS has been involved in a number of public incidents and controversies.

=== Bill Sutch affair ===
In 1974, the SIS was the source of information that led to the arrest of Bill Sutch, an economist and former civil servant, on charges of spying for the Soviet Union. Sutch was acquitted and the SIS was criticised for having accused him, although it has also been alleged that the SIS was correct in its accusation. The SIS released most of its files on Sutch in 2008.

=== 1981 Springbok tour ===
In 1981, the SIS was criticised for drawing up a list of 15 "subversives" who participated in protests against the 1981 Springbok Tour, a visit by South Africa's apartheid rugby team. Characterising individual protesters as "subversives" was deemed by many to be a violation of the right to protest government decisions.

=== 1981 briefcase leak ===
Also in 1981, an SIS operative inadvertently left a briefcase, containing a copy of Penthouse, three cold meat pies, and notes of a dinner party hosted by a German diplomat, on a journalist's fence in Wellington, where it was found by the son of another journalist, Fran O'Sullivan.

=== 1981 attempted assassination of Queen Elizabeth II ===
In March 2018, the SIS released a memo confirming that an assassination attempt was made on Queen Elizabeth II during her 1981 visit in Dunedin despite alleged efforts by the New Zealand Police to cover up the incident. The perpetrator was 17 year-old Dunedin teenager Christopher Lewis. Lewis electrocuted himself in prison in 1997 while awaiting trial for an unrelated murder.

=== 1985 Rainbow Warrior bombing ===
In 1985, the SIS failed to prevent the French operation in which DGSE operatives bombed the Greenpeace vessel Rainbow Warrior, killing a photographer.

=== 1980s Cold War embassies espionage operations ===
In early June 2020, Radio New Zealand reported that the NZSIS had raided the Czechoslovak embassy in Wellington in 1986 as part of a joint operation with the British Secret Intelligence Service (MI6) to steal Warsaw Pact codebooks in order to break into the encrypted communications of Soviet-aligned countries during the Cold War. This operation would have breached the Vienna Convention on Diplomatic Relations. This revelation came to light as a result of an RNZ podcast series called The Service, produced by Wellington writer and documentary maker John Daniell, whose mother and step-father had both worked for the NZSIS. Daniell said that his step-father was involved in the raid and had claimed it was a success. Daniell's account was corroborated by Gerald Hensley, who served as the head of the Prime Minister's Department under the-then Prime Minister David Lange, and former NZSIS officer Kit Bennetts. In response, both former Prime Minister Helen Clark and Andrew Little, who is the Minister in charge of the NZSIS and Government Communications Security Bureau (GCSB), refused to confirm that they had authorised raids on embassies based in New Zealand. RNZ also reported that the SIS had spied upon Labour MP Richard Northey under the pretext of his support for racial equality and nuclear disarmament. At the time of the spying, Northey was chair of the Justice and Law Reform Select Committee, which was responsible for financial oversight of the SIS, and of legislation altering its powers.

=== Surveillance of activists ===
In 1996, two SIS agents broke into the home of Aziz Choudry. Choudry was an organiser with GATT Watchdog, which was holding a public forum and rally against an APEC (Asia-Pacific Economic Cooperation) Trade Ministers meeting hosted in Christchurch. The Court of Appeal ruled that the SIS had exceeded their legislated powers of interception. Parliament later amended the SIS Act to give the SIS powers of entry into private property.

In 2004, it was alleged that the SIS was spying on Māori individuals and organisations, including those associated with the new Māori Party, for political purposes under the codename "Operation Leaf". A government inquiry led by the Inspector-General of Intelligence and Security later rejected these claims in April 2005. The prime minister, Helen Clark called the allegations "baseless". The Sunday Star-Times, the original source of the story, printed a full apology and retraction.

In December 2008, it was discovered that a Christchurch resident, Rob Gilchrist, had been spying on peace organisations and individuals including Greenpeace, Iraq war protesters, animal rights and climate change campaigners. He confessed to the allegations after his partner, Rochelle Rees, found emails sent between him and Special Investigation Group (SIG) officers, having found the emails while fixing Gilchrist's computer. Rochelle Rees was a Labour party activist as well as an animal rights campaigner. Gilchrist was said to have passed on information via an anonymous email address to SIG officers including Detective Peter Gilroy and Detective Senior Sergeant John Sjoberg. SIG is connected with SIS. Gilchrist had been paid up to $600 a week by police for spying on New Zealand citizens, reportedly for at least 10 years. Gilchrist also said he was offered money by Thomson Clark Investigations to spy on the Save Happy Valley Coalition, an environmental group. The incident implied members of New Zealand political parties were spied on by SIS and SIG.

=== Ahmed Zaoui affair ===
In 2002, the SIS issued a security risk certificate for Ahmed Zaoui, an Algerian asylum-seeker, and recommended his deportation. Zaoui was detained under a warrant of commitment. Inspector General Laurie Greig resigned in March 2004 after controversy over comments perceived as biased against Zaoui. The risk certificate was subsequently lifted, allowing Zaoui to remain.

=== Access to records ===
Until 2003 the SIS was reluctant to release information on potential people of interest either under the Privacy Act or the Official Information Act due to security concerns. In 2003 it adopted a new archives policy, enabling wider release of such information. Information must still be declassified, but would be released "regardless of whether the information reflects unfavourably on [the SIS] or shows it in a good light." In 2017 the Privacy Act was amended to make the SIS subject to most of its principles.

=== 2004 passport scandal ===
In July 2004, the SIS was criticised for not knowing that Israeli "intelligence contract assets" had been in New Zealand fraudulently purchasing New Zealand passports. This came to light when the New Zealand Police discovered the fraud. The case became world news and an embarrassment for both the SIS and Mossad. Two of the Israelis involved (Uriel Kelman and Eli Cara who had been based in Australia) were deported to Israel, while two non-Israelis believed to be involved (American Ze'ev Barkan and New Zealander David Reznic) left New Zealand before they were caught.

=== Surveillance of students ===
In November 2009, the SIS was criticised for asking university staff to report their colleagues or students if they were behaving suspiciously. The SIS said it was part of an effort to prevent the spread of weapons of mass destruction.

=== 2011 investigation of alleged Mossad operation ===
In July 2011, the SIS was involved in an investigation of Israeli backpackers who were in New Zealand at the time of the 2011 Christchurch earthquake, in which one of the Israelis was killed. The Israelis were alleged to have been Mossad agents attempting to infiltrate the New Zealand government's computer databases and steal sensitive information. The investigation concluded that there was no evidence of a Mossad operation.

=== 2019 Christchurch mosque shootings ===
After the 15 March 2019 white supremacist terrorist attack on two mosques in Christchurch, the failure of the SIS and other NZ state agencies to pay adequate attention to the far right, and to detect the terrorist was strongly criticised. Green Party MP Marama Davidson and Tuhoe activist and artist Tame Iti, among others, suggested that the SIS and other state security and intelligence agencies had the wrong people under surveillance, including Muslim communities, Māori, and environmental activists. The spokesperson for the Islamic Women's Council of New Zealand, Anjum Rahman, voiced frustration at the failure of the SIS to take Muslim community concerns about racist violence and the rise of the alt-right in New Zealand seriously.

Prime Minister Jacinda Ardern announced that there would be an inquiry into the circumstances that led to the mosque attacks and what the relevant agencies (SIS, Government Communications Security Bureau (GCSB), police, Customs and Immigration) knew about the individual and the accused's activities. The official Royal Commission into the attacks was made public on 8 December 2020, and found that intelligence agencies including the NZSIS and GCSB had placed excessive focus on Islamist terrorism, at the expense of detecting far-right and White supremacist threats.

On 22 March 2021, the NZSIS released an internal review known as the "Arotake review" exploring its decision-making process prior to the Christchurch mosque shootings. The review had been conducted by a counter-terrorism expert from the Five Eyes. In late March 2021, NZSIS Director-General Rebecca Kitteridge indicated that the NZSIS would be paying more attention to far right and white supremacist groups.

=== 2020 Zhenhua Data leak ===
On 16 September 2020, the NZSIS confirmed that it was evaluating the "potential risks and security concerns" of the Chinese intelligence firm Zhenhua Data's "Overseas Key Individuals Database." The database had profiled 730 New Zealanders including Prime Minister Jacinda Ardern's mother Laurell, father Ross, sister Louse, former Prime Minister John Key's son Max, sportswoman Barbara Kendall, Māori leaders Dame Naida Glavish, former Minister of Finance Ruth Richardson, and Chief Censor David Shanks. Zhenhua's database had been leaked to the American academic and China expert Professor Chris Balding, who passed the information to Australian cyber security firm Internet 2.0. The data leak was covered by several international media including the Australian Financial Review, the Washington Post, the Indian Express, the Globe and Mail, and Il Foglio.

=== 2021 disclosure of counterintelligence operations ===
In late March 2021, the NZSIS's Director-General Rebecca Kitteridge confirmed that its agents had discovered a New Zealander who was gathering information for an unidentified foreign intelligence agency about individuals whom an unidentified foreign state regards as dissidents. University of Canterbury political scientist Anne-Marie Brady claimed that the spy had been working for China. In addition, the spy agency confirmed that, during the period between 2019 and 2020, it had disrupted the efforts of a person working for a foreign state to influence senior policy-makers, investigated the activities of individuals linked to several foreign states, and investigated foreign efforts to influence local and central government figures and New Zealand's academic sector.

In late October 2021, Radio New Zealand reported that the NZSIS had designated a Chinese couple as a national security threat, prompting Immigration New Zealand to block the couple's residency applications. The NZSIS asserted that the husband and wife had assisted Chinese intelligence services and deliberately concealed the amount of contact they had maintained with them. The couple had migrated to New Zealand in 2016 under the entrepreneur work visa scheme and established a business. The husband's lawyer countered that the man had maintained legitimate contact with Chinese intelligence services while working at a private company in China because he had helped employees to obtain visas to enter China for business purposes.

=== Spying on Nicky Hager ===
In November 2022 the SIS paid journalist Nicky Hager $66,000 after unlawfully accessing his phone records. The spying was in response to Hager's book Other People's Wars, and attempted unsuccessfully to identify his sources. The Inspector-General of Intelligence and Security found that the SIS had no lawful power to investigate, and had not showed the kind of caution expected in a free and democratic society.

=== Spying on Yuan Zhao ===
In March 2023, Stuff reported that the NZSIS had questioned a Chinese New Zealander named Yuan Zhao in October 2022 on the suspicion that Zhao had used his position as a senior government analyst for the Public Service Commission (PSC) to spy for the Chinese Government and because of his "close personal relationships" with Chinese diplomats based in New Zealand. Zhao was subsequently suspended from his job at the Commission in late 2022. In March 2023, Zhao denied supplying the Chinese Government with information and claimed the NZSIS had no evidence to substantiate the information. In response, the NZSIS and PSC declined to comment on Zhao's case, citing security protocols. Zhao subsequently complained to the intelligence agency's watchdog, the Inspector-General of Intelligence and Security Brendan Horsley, who confirmed his office was investigating Zhao's complaint and would inform the public about the outcome. In response to media coverage, the Chinese Embassy issued a statement describing the espionage allegations against Zhao as "ill-founded" and motivated by an "ulterior motive to smear and attack China, which we firmly oppose."

=== Threat assessments ===
On 11 August 2023, the NZSIS published its first unclassified threat assessment which identified violent extremism, foreign interference and espionage as three major threats to New Zealand. For the first time, the NZSIS identified China, Iran, and Russia as the foreign governments most responsible for foreign interference in New Zealand. According to the report, Chinese intelligence services were actively targeting ethnic Chinese communities in New Zealand while Russia was spreading disinformation among some New Zealanders through its international disinformation campaigns and seeking to acquire new technologies in order to circumvent international sanctions. The NZSIS also reported that Iranian state actors were monitoring and reporting on Iranian diaspora communities and dissident groups in New Zealand.

In early September 2024, the NZSIS published its second threat assessment. The report concluded that a small number of foreign states conducted interference and espionage operations targeting New Zealand and New Zealanders; that public and private sector insiders were vulnerable to espionage and unauthorised disclosure of information; that the risk of terror threats in New Zealand were low but that lone wolf attacks were the most likely scenarios; and that some individuals subscribed to violent extremist ideologies. The report noted that China uses professional social network websites such as LinkedIn for intelligence gathering. The threat assessment also found that violent extremists expoused various views including anti-Māori sentiment, anti-Semitism, hostility towards rainbow communities, Islamophobia and anti-immigrant sentiments. Following the report's release, the Public Service Association express concerns that job cuts at the Department of Internal Affairs could hurt New Zealand's response to online harm, foreign interference and digital espionage.

On 21 August 2025, the NZSIS released its third threat assessment. The report said that New Zealand's security situation had deteriorated since 2024, and identified the most significant threats as foreign states and "young, vulnerable people supporting violent extremist ideologies." The NZSIS attributed the worsening security environment to the Indo-Pacific becoming a focal point for competition between major powers and China. NZSIS Director-General Andrew Hampton also expressed concern about the online radicalisation of young people and said they were being radicalised individually rather that being part of a "network terrorist organisation." Other contributing factors to radicalisation included socio-economic instability, poor mental health, developmental trauma and "low emotional maturity." The NZSIS report argued that lone wolf attacks were the most plausible violent extremist attack scenarios in New Zealand. The NZSIS also said that several states including China carried out "foreign interference" in New Zealand and described Chinese united front activities as "regularly deceptive, coercive and corruptive." The NZSIS said that Chinese "foreign interference activities" included using co-optees or proxies to carry out online and physical surveillance activities such as monitoring social media, photographing individuals, collecting information and taking control of community organisations. The NZSIS report also warned local councils that sister city relationships could be exploited for "foreign interference" activities. In response, local Chinese community leaders including Richard Leung and New Zealand Chinese Association president Paul Chin welcomed the NZSIS report but warned that it should not be used to stigmatise Chinese New Zealanders. The Chinese Embassy denounced the report, claiming it was "rife with unfounded speculation, distortion of facts, and baseless accusations against China". University of Canterbury political scientist Dr Anne-Marie Brady welcomed the report for highlighting the national and external security threats facing New Zealand.

=== Chinese recruitment of former NZDF personnel ===
In late March 2024, NZSIS Director-General Andrew Hampton confirmed that seven former New Zealand Defence Force personnel had been recruited by the Test Flying Academy of South Africa to train the People's Liberation Army over the past 18 months. The former NZDF personnel had been supporting military and aviation training. These seven individuals had since left their roles at the Test Flying Academy.

=== 2026 alleged Russian espionage incident ===
On 27 July 2026, Russia's domestic intelligence agency, the Federal Security Bureau (FSB) arrested a 55-year old Russian man in Khabarovsk, alleging that the man used foreign email services and messaging apps to provide information relating to Russian national security to the NZSIS and its Five Eyes partners. The FSB and Russian Ambassador to New Zealand Stanislav Krans confirmed that Russian authorities were investigating the man for violating Article 275 (treason) of the Russian Criminal Code. The NZSIS declined to comment on what "may or may not be an operational matter". Senior New Zealand officials including Prime Minister Christopher Luxon, Foreign Minister Winston Peters and Minister responsible for the NZSIS Chris Penk declined to comment and referred press inquiries to the NZSIS.

== See also ==
- New Zealand intelligence agencies
- Foreign espionage in New Zealand
- Mass surveillance in New Zealand
- 2025 New Zealand espionage case
