= Anjum Rahman =

New Zealand Muslim community leader and human rights activist

Anjum Rahman MNZM
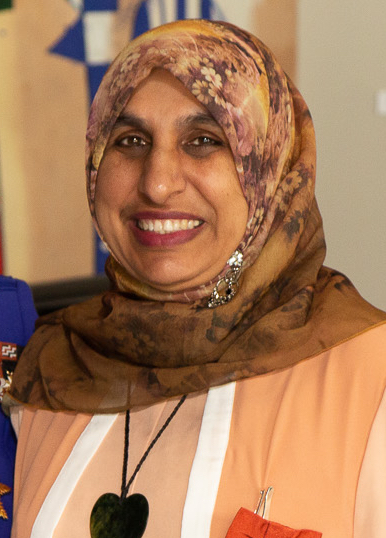
- Rahman in 2019
- Born: 16 July 1966 (age 59); Mahuwara, Uttar Pradesh, India

Anjum Nausheen Rahman MNZM (born 16 July 1966) is a New Zealand Muslim community leader and human rights activist who advocates for the rights of Muslim women.

== Early life and family ==
Rahman was born on 16 July 1966 in the village of Mahuwara in the Indian state of Uttar Pradesh. Her family moved to New Zealand from Canada in 1972 when she was five years old, after her father completed a PhD and was offered a post-doctoral position at the Ministry of Agriculture and Fisheries in Hamilton. She became a naturalised New Zealand citizen in 1976.

== Career ==
Rahman was a founding member of the Islamic Women's Council of New Zealand (IWCNZ) when it was established in 1990 and served as its first secretary. She is also a founding member of the Hamilton Ethnic Women's Centre (known commonly as Shama) and has served as a trustee on its board since 2002.

Rahman was a spokesperson for the Muslim community following the Christchurch mosque shootings. In media interviews following the attack, she voiced frustration at the failure of the New Zealand Security Intelligence Service to take concerns about violence towards the Muslim community, Islamophobia and the rise of the alt-right in New Zealand seriously.

In response to the attacks, Rahman established the Inclusive Aotearoa Collective to combat discrimination. She made submissions and presentations to a parliamentary select committee on behalf of the Islamic Women's Council in support of gun law changes, saying that the tightening of those laws would prevent violence towards vulnerable communities.

Since 2017 Rahman and the Inclusive Aotearoa Collective have advocated for a national strategy for inclusion and anti-discrimination.

=== Politics ===
Rahman stood as a candidate for the Hamilton City Council in 2013, and as a list candidate for the New Zealand Labour Party at the 2005, 2008 and 2014 general elections.

== Honours and awards ==
In the 2019 Queen's Birthday Honours, Rahman was appointed a Member of the New Zealand Order of Merit, for services to ethnic communities and women.

In 2019, she was shortlisted for the New Zealander of the Year Award.
