= 2025 New Zealand espionage case =

Espionage case

The 2025 New Zealand espionage case is the first time in history a New Zealand soldier was convicted of espionage. On 18 August 2025, a military court convicted New Zealand Defence Force (NZDF) soldier Jack Captein for attempted espionage possession of objectionable material. On 6 October 2026, the Court of Appeal of New Zealand lifted his name suppression, during public interest in "open justice."

== Background ==
The New Zealand Defence Force soldier, Jack Captein, was arrested in December 2020 after security services watched him closely during his time in service. Authorities claimed he attempted to supply secret military information including maps, telephone directories, annotated aerial photos, a security assessment letter, ID cards, access codes, and login credentials to someone he believed was a foreign government agent, but who turned out to be an undercover officer. Court papers that noted the soldier's extreme beliefs, ties to far right groups Action Zealandia and the Dominion Movement, with the fact that he held banned material like the video of the 2019 Christchurch mosque attacks, drew attention to the case.

== Espionage attempt ==
According to reports Captein tried to pass between 5 and 12 December 2019 classified military information that included documents, maps, telephone directories, and security details of New Zealand Defence Force bases. He believed he was providing information to a foreign country that remains unknown, while he was actually dealing with an undercover New Zealand officer.

== Charges ==
At first, Captein faced 17 charges, including spying, looking at secret information, and having extremist material. In March 2025, these were reduced to three main charges of trying to commit espionage, using a computer system dishonestly and possessing banned material.

== Verdict ==
Captein eventually pleaded guilty to all of the charges that resulted in New Zealand's first conviction for attempted espionage, on 18 August 2025. Prior to this case, according to legal experts, the most notable case in New Zealand was the one of economist Bill Sutch, who was charged with spying between 1974 and 1975. He was eventually acquitted. Captein was sentenced to a two year custodial sentence at the New Zealand Defence Force's Services Corrective Establishment at Burnham Military Camp.

== Appeal ==
In late October 2025, the NZ Defence Force's Director of Military Prosecutions filed an appeal at the Courts Martial Appeal Court in Wellington against the court martial's sentence, which they described as "manifestly inadequate." Lieutenant Colonel Robert Goguel, on behalf of the New Zealand Crown, sought to have Captein transferred from the Services Corrective Establishment to a civilian prison on the grounds that he had betrayed his oath of allegiance, was not remorseful and was not suffering from any form of addiction. In response, Captein's lawyer Stephen Winter argued that the court martial panel had taken into account the five-year delay in bringing the matter the trial, which the defendant had spent on "open arrest" at Linton Military Camp. The Appeal Court's panel of three judges have reserved their opinion.

In May 2026, the Court of Appeal allowed the New Zealand Crown's appeal against Captein's sentencing to proceed, finding that the two year sentence of military detention did not reflect the seriousness of his offending and failed to act as a deterrent. While the Appeal Court proposed a sentence of 15 months, this was subject to a Crown recall due to an error in the sentencing commencement date caused by a technicality in Court Martial Appeals law. On 6 October 2026, the Court of Appeal dismissed Captein's second appeal against the Crown's refusal to grant name suppression. He had argued that name suppression would have placed him and his family at risk from the foreign power he thought he was spying for. In dismissing his appeal, the Court of Appeal's ruling found that the consequences of publication did not amount to extreme hardship and cited the public interest in "open justice."

== See also ==
- Action Zealandia
- Christchurch mosque shootings
- Espionage Act of 1917
- Foreign espionage in New Zealand
