= Aliya Danzeisen =

New Zealand Muslim women's community leader

Aliya Danzeisen MNZM
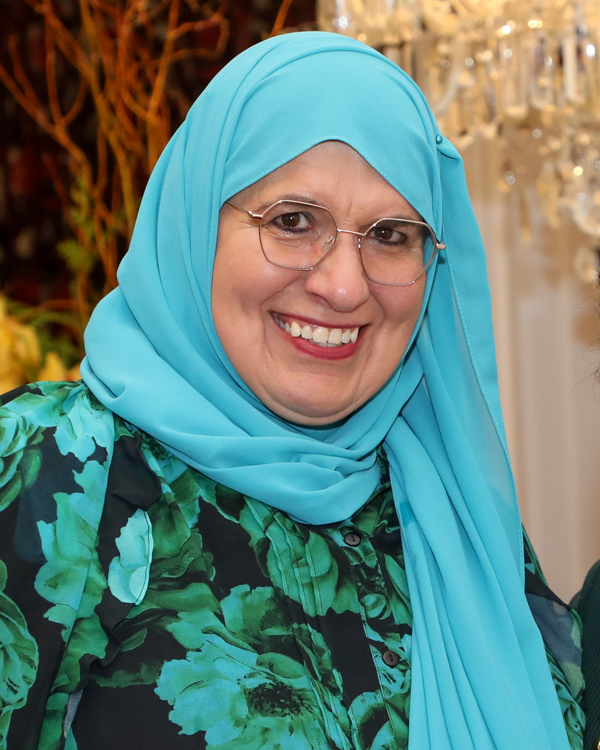
- Awards: Honorary Member of the New Zealand Order of Merit

Allyn Sue Danzeisen MNZM, known as Aliya Danzeisen, is an American–New Zealand lawyer, teacher and the national coordinator of the Islamic Women's Council of New Zealand (IWCNZ). Danzeisen was appointed an Honorary Member of the New Zealand Order of Merit in 2024 for services to the Muslim community and women.

== Academic career ==
Danzeisen grew up a Christian in a small rural community in the mid-west of the USA. She completed a Master of Laws at the University of Waikato and a doctorate of laws in America. She worked in corporate bankruptcies and as a legal advisor in Florida before deciding to immigrate to New Zealand in 2006, after the reelection of George W. Bush in 2004. She is a Head of Spanish at a secondary school in Hamilton.

Danzeisen converted to Islam in 2011. From 2015 she was the assistant national coordinator for the Islamic Women's Council, and from 2020 is the national coordinator. She wrote the Council's response to the Royal Commission of Inquiry into the Christchurch mosque attacks. Danzeisen founded the Women’s Organisation of the Waikato Muslim Association in 2008, and ran various activities including a leadership programme.

Danzeisen has written about how the Christchurch mosque attacks could have been prevented, and about how the Royal Commission of Inquiry did not serve justice. She is a member of Kāpuia, the Ministerial Advisory group on the Government’s Response to the Royal Commission of Inquiry. Danzeisen was New Zealand's representative at the United Nations Global Congress of Victims of Terrorism in 2022, and the Global Summit of Women 2023.

== Honours and awards ==
Danzeisen was appointed an Honorary Member of the New Zealand Order of Merit in the 2024 King's Birthday Honours, for services to the Muslim community and women.

In 2022, Danzeisen was a finalist for the E Tū Whānau Ann Dysart Kahukura Award, which is awarded in recognition of inspirational community leadership. She was also a finalist in the New Zealand Women of Influence Awards in 2016 and 2020.
