= Bill Sutch =

New Zealand economist and historian and suspected Soviet Spy

William Ball Sutch
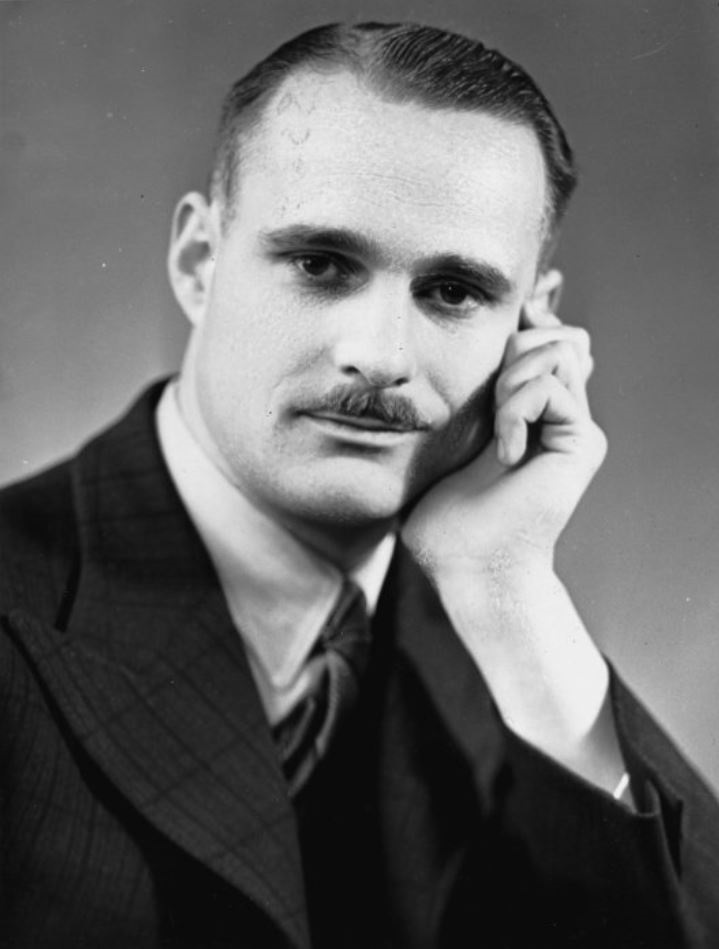
- Sutch circa 1947

6th Secretary of Industries and Commerce
- In office 4 September 1958 – 1 April 1965
- Appointed by: Walter Nash
- Preceded by: Leonard A. Atkinson (acting)
- Succeeded by: Jim Moriarty

Personal details
- Born: 27 June 1907 Southport, England
- Died: 28 September 1975 (aged 68) Wellington, New Zealand
- Spouses: Morva Milburn Williams (married 1934–1944); Shirley Hilda Stanley Smith (married 1944–1975)
- Children: Helen Sutch
- Occupation: Economist, historian, writer, public servant

William Ball Sutch (27 June 1907 – 28 September 1975) was a New Zealand economist, historian, writer, public servant, and public intellectual. He was suspected of being a Soviet spy and in 1974, he was charged with trying to pass New Zealand government information to the Soviet Union. He was acquitted, an outcome that has been the subject of much debate since then. Subsequently possession of assets in a Swiss bank account and in the Bahamas well beyond his visible means, additional evidence not presented in trial and disclosures from former KGB staff about his recruitment, passing information and pay have reinforced suspicions he was a spy, although he has defenders who do not consider this definitive proof.

== Early life ==
Sutch was born in Southport, England in 1907, but his family moved to New Zealand when he was eight months old. His father, Ebenezer (Ted) Sutch, was a journeyman carpenter, and his mother, Ellen Sutch (née Ball), a dressmaker. He grew up in the Methodist faith, which was to have a strong influence on him throughout his life.

He went to Brooklyn primary school, Wellington College, then the Wellington College of Education and Victoria University College (later Victoria University of Wellington) where he gained a MA and B.Com. His field of interest at University, particularly, was in the English Poor Law, and it is this work that led to a fellowship being offered to Columbia University, the offer effectively a prize for his work up till then. Before taking this up he had taught at Nelson College (he did much of his degrees part-time, while teaching) and Wanganui Technical College. At Columbia he was awarded a PhD in economics in 1932 on "Price fixing in New Zealand. After some travel he then returned to New Zealand which was experiencing the Great Depression. The Depression, and his family's position also, deeply affected his personal philosophy.

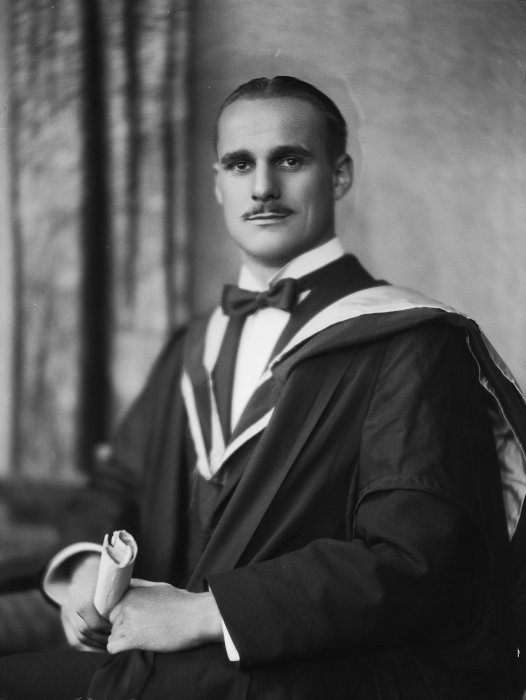
Sutch in 1931

In April 1933, Sutch was one of four people including Morva Williams, his future wife, who were reported missing in the Tararua Range during an attempt to be the first to follow a particular route during the winter season. The trip was scheduled to take two days, but they were delayed when two of the members were injured in a fall and all were forced to travel very slowly through some of the worst weather recorded, before finally making their way out more than two weeks later. Once they were noticed missing, the resultant search became the largest search and rescue operation in New Zealand up until that time, involving around 200 people.

== Career ==
Politically, Sutch was generally on the left, although his wide network of friends included people of all political persuasions, and perhaps the person he most admired was the centre-right politician Gordon Coates. He was involved in a number of left-leaning organisations and associations, and helped edit and publish literature connected with them. In 1939, he assisted the publication of "Psycho-pathology in Politics", written by Labour Party dissident John A. Lee which was an attack on the party's leader, Michael Joseph Savage. Sutch wrote numerous books. Among the first were: Poverty and Progress in New Zealand (1941, 1969), which echoed the work Progress and Poverty, by the Californian Henry George (1879), known as the "single [land] taxer"; and The Quest for Security in New Zealand (1942, 1966)., which to Sutch was a related topic.

=== Early career ===
In 1933, following some teaching in Palmerston North Boys' High School, Sutch took up a position in the office of Gordon Coates, who was Minister of Finance. When the government changed, he continued on in the office of Coates's successor, Walter Nash of the First Labour Government. During this time he was elected as the first President of the newly formed New Zealand Association of Scientific Workers (now known as the NZ Association of Scientists). He had considerable input into economic policy at the time. Eventually, Sutch's political activities were deemed incompatible with his official role, and he was transferred out of the economic sphere. He left the civil service to join the army, becoming an instructor. He returned to the Ministry of Supply arranging equipment and finance.

=== Work overseas ===
At the end of the war, he took up a position with the new United Nations Relief and Rehabilitation Administration (UNRRA), working in Sydney and then in London, covering war-devastated Europe. As a result of this work, he was selected to head the New Zealand delegation to the United Nations, where he held positions with the Economic and Social Commission and UNICEF. He played a crucial role in a UN decision to continue with UNICEF, despite a United States desire to close it down. Ben Alpers has said that some of the credit for UNICEF's Nobel Peace Prize should go to Sutch and New Zealand. Soviet documents claim he was recruited as a spy in 1950.

=== Return to New Zealand ===
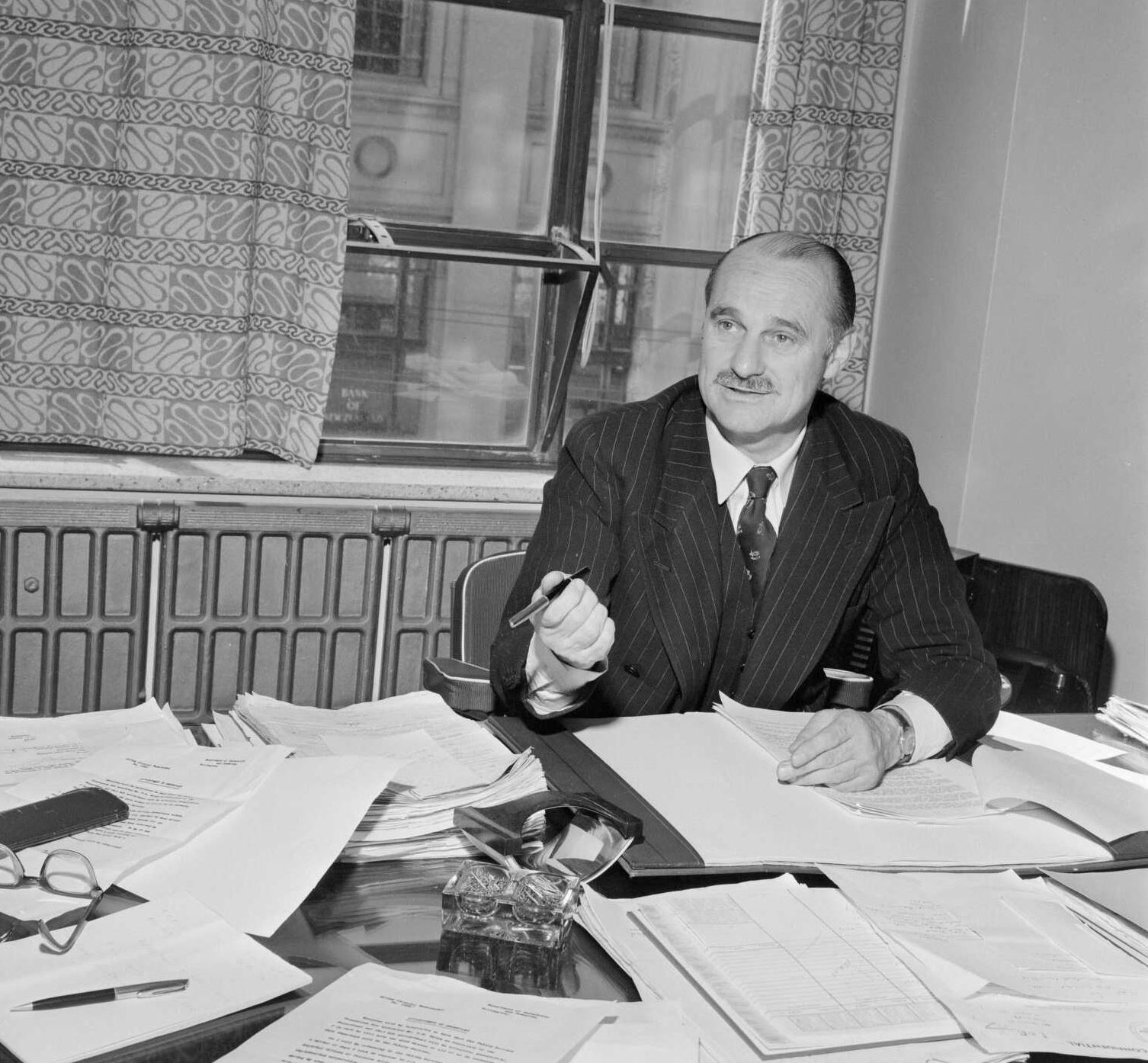
Sutch in 1958

Upon returning to New Zealand in 1951, Sutch worked for the Department of Industries and Commerce, eventually in 1958 rising to be its Secretary. The First National Government had blocked Sutch's promotion to the head of the department because of an American threat that they would regard New Zealand's security as suspect (the United States communicated secret information to its ANZUS and SEATO allies which included New Zealand). Leading National Party MPs openly regarded Sutch to be a communist. However the Second Labour Government appointed Sutch to be permanent head of the department. Prime Minister Walter Nash, who knew Sutch well, ignored the objections of the Security Service who thought an appointment was not worth compromising allegiance to the United States. Nash's biographer described Sutch's elevation as a "courageous decision".

There he promoted the development of the New Zealand economy using the policy instruments of the day, including price controls, subsidies and import controls. He concluded that pastoral exports by themselves would not generate enough foreign exchange to maintain full employment, and would continue to make the economy highly vulnerable to fluctuations in international conditions. So he sought import substitution, the further processing of agricultural production for export, and the exporting of non-pastoral agricultural exports, manufacturing and services (such as tourism). As such he foresaw, championed and laid the foundations of the great export diversifications of the 1970s.

Sutch's promotion of industrialisation was anathema to much of the farming community, though many in the business community supported him. In March 1965, he was forced to retire after 40 years of public service employment. His dismissal letter said, "you do not enjoy the confidence of the business community and of the Government to the measure desired of the permanent head of your department." At the age of 57 he became a consultant. Among his many further publications were the books, Colony or Nation?, The Responsible Society in New Zealand, Takeover New Zealand, and Women with a Cause. His festschrift, Spirit of an Age, was published in 1975. Sutch became active in the arts and architectural communities, including the Wellington Architectural Centre. He was an early and active promoter of New Zealand design, asserting that quality design was central to economic and social development. He helped to set up the Wellington Architectural Centre, provided the intellectual framework that led to the formation of the New Zealand Industrial Design Council and chaired the Queen Elizabeth II Arts Council (now Creative New Zealand).

=== Legacy ===
Sutch's writing provides one of the most comprehensive accounts of, and visions for, New Zealand. While his views were often original and independent, many that were rejected at the time are now accepted. He was a nation-builder who wanted to see an economically strong and socially fair New Zealand, free from colonial ties, whether economic or political. He was a committed nationalist, and on many matters ahead of his times.

Economist Brian Easton has argued that: "The events surrounding the trial overshadowed the significance of what went before, and have muted subsequent recognition of his intellectual contributions." The trial also overshadowed his role in the establishment of UNICEF. Sutch's daughter, Helen Sutch, said after the declassification of New Zealand Security Intelligence Service (SIS) documents in 2008: "Our family hopes that justice can now be done to that historic legacy, which has been overshadowed for so long by events in the last year of his life".

== Controversy ==
=== Charges under the Official Secrets Act ===
In September 1974, Sutch was arrested and charged under the Official Secrets Act 1951 following a series of clandestine meetings with KGB agent Dimitri Rasgovorov, an official of the Soviet Union's embassy in Wellington. Sutch was the only New Zealander ever to stand trial under the espionage provisions of the Official Secrets Act, based on the British Act of 1911 and repealed in 1983.

The SIS aimed to catch Sutch passing on information during a meeting at night in a public park, but did not detain Sutch until after Rasgovorov had left. They assumed Sutch would co-operate once caught red handed. When he did not, they could not provide specific details of what information Sutch had passed to the Soviet diplomat (hence the curious charge that he faced, under the Official Secrets Act, of passing unspecified information to the Soviet Union). Sutch claimed his meetings with Soviet officials were after the Russian ostensibly approached him in his capacity as a stalwart of the NZ Friends of Israel, for information about who were the Zionists in New Zealand, and to discuss China.

At trial the SIS claimed that the retired Sutch had obtained official government information to give to the Soviets but was unable to provide details of what information. Following a high-profile trial, a jury acquitted Sutch of the charges in February 1975.

Sutch began to suffer ill health at about the same time as he was arrested and died from liver cancer six months after the trial on 28 September 1975 at Wellington, shortly after holding his just-born first grandson, Piers.

=== Subsequent contemporary debate ===
Debate over his guilt or innocence continued long after his death. A book published in 2006 by C. H. (Kit) Bennetts, the SIS officer who had first observed Sutch, reasserted the claim that he was guilty. In an editorial, the New Zealand Herald applauded the publication of the book, and said "Bennetts' unauthorised account has done the SIS a service".

On 9 May 2008, most of the SIS file on the Sutch and the trial were declassified. The files contained no new material information. On the other hand, a Top Secret 1976 report by chief ombudsman Sir Guy Powles found that SIS actions had been unlawful when they burgled and bugged his office.

In August 2014, the University of Cambridge released details from the KGB files from the Wellington Embassy that they held in archives that had been provided by Soviet defector Vasili Mitrokhin in 1992. According to Phil Kitchen of The Dominion Post, "The documents don't name Sutch but the details clearly identify him and state he was recruited [by the KGB] in 1950." If the person was indeed Sutch, he was recruited while representing New Zealand at the United Nations, and continued contact with the KGB for 24 years, including 15 years when he was employed in high government office. Sutch's daughter did not accept the evidence, stating: "It is well known that KGB agents in general were desperate to talk up any contacts they had because they were under pressure from their superiors".

== Personal life ==
On 12 January 1934 at Wellington, Bill Sutch married Morva Milburn Williams, a schoolteacher. There were no children of the marriage. His marriage to Morva was dissolved on 2 February 1944, and he married Shirley Hilda Stanley Smith (1916–2008), a lecturer and later a lawyer, in Auckland on 2 June that year. They had one daughter, Helen, who was economic adviser to Prime Minister David Lange and rose to a prominent position with the World Bank. In 1953, Bill and Shirley commissioned a house (the Sutch-Smith House) in the Wellington suburb of Brooklyn designed by the prominent Austrian architect Ernst Plischke who lived and worked in New Zealand from 1939 to 1963.

Two biographies have been published about Smith and her marriage to Sutch; "Shirley Smith: An Examined Life" by Sarah Gaitanos 2019 was shortlisted for the Ockham award. In 2020 her son-in-law, Keith Ovenden, published "Bill and Shirley – a memoir" which does not mention Gaitanos' biography (the family had withdrawn cooperation during the writing of it).

== See also ==
- Foreign espionage in New Zealand
- 2025 New Zealand espionage case

Government offices
Preceded by Leonard A. Atkinson	Secretary of Industries and Commerce; 1958–1965	Succeeded by Jim Moriarty
