= Islamic Women's Council of New Zealand =

IWCNZ logo

The Islamic Women's Council of New Zealand (IWCNZ) is a national umbrella organisation for Muslim women in New Zealand that was formed in 1990. The group is organised into regional chapters. Its activities have included educational classes, counselling, lecture tours, sports events, annual conferences, youth camps, and charitable activities. IWCNZ has also represented Muslim community interest at the New Zealand Parliament, various government ministries and agencies, the media, civil society and various national and international forums.

== Functions and structure ==
The Islamic Women's Council of New Zealand's stated vision is to help "Muslim women reach their full potential through participation and collaboration in community life in Aotearoa New Zealand with the guidance of the Quran and the Sunnah." Its stated mission is to "always endeavor to co-ordinate and develop various activities that provide help, guidance, personal growth and development for all sisters in Islam with inspiration from the Holy Quran."

The IWCNZ consists of a national body and several regional branches. The national body has organised national conferences, lecture tours, youth camps and workshops. The regional branches have organised various programmes and activities including educational classes, counselling and support services, sports events, food banks and prison visits. By 2019, IWCNZ had established regional branches in several cities including Auckland, Hamilton, Rotorua, Hastings, Palmerston North, Wellington, Christchurch and Dunedin.

Nominated regional representatives also serve on the IWCNZ's full council, which is part of the Federation of Islamic Associations of New Zealand (FIANZ). The full council also elects a five-member Administration Council, which governs the IWCNZ at a national level. The IWCNZ has also represented Muslim community interests in the New Zealand Parliament, government ministries and agencies, the media and various national and international forums related to faith, human rights, youth development and health.

== History and advocacy work ==
The IWCNZ was established during a national hui (meeting) in 1990, formally coming into existence in 1991. While women were represented in the leadership of other Muslim organisations such as the New Zealand Muslim Association, the IWCNZ was founded to cater to the needs of Muslim women in New Zealand. Aliya Danzeisen served as its first president while Anjum Rahman served as its first secretary.

Between 2014 and 2018, the IWCNZ lobbied the New Zealand Government and several government departments and statutory bodies including the Department of Internal Affairs, New Zealand Security Intelligence Service, the Ministry of Social Development, the Office of Ethnic Communities and Human Rights Commission about the Muslim community's concerns with Islamophobia, "Jihadi brides", media misrepresentation and counter-terrorism legislation. The IWCNZs' leaders Danzeisen and Rahman sough to ensure that Muslim feedback was included in the public policy process and to combat anti-Muslim prejudice in New Zealand society and the media particularly the alt right. The IWCNZ also developed a working relationship with Race Relations Commissioner Susan Devoy.

Following the Christchurch mosque shootings on 15 March 2019, the IWCNZ represented the Muslim community in the media and sought to highlight Muslims' and other ethnic communities' experiences with discrimination and abuse. The IWCNZ also issued a submission to the Royal Commission of Inquiry into the mosque shootings calling on security services to extend their intelligence gathering to White supremacists and the alt right and advocated efforts to help and improve the well-being of the Muslim and other communities in order to combat extremism. In February 2021, the IWCNZ's spokesperson Anjum Rahman urged the Government to implement the Royal Commission's recommendations into government policy and legislation.

Following the outbreak of the Gaza war in early October 2023, IWCNZ urged the New Zealand Government to speak out against human rights abuses and violations in the Gaza Strip.

In March 2024, IWCNZ national coordinator Aliya Danzeisen criticised the National-led coalition government for failing to implement hate speech legislation and create a new intelligence agency, two of the recommendations of the Royal Commission of Inquiry into the Christchurch mosque shootings. Danzeisen however credited the previous Sixth Labour Government for implementing new firearms legislation in response to the shootings.

In August 2024, IWCNZ launched a social media campaign called "Just CHILL NZ" to promote understanding of Muslim women and to combat negative stereotypes about the Islamic faith.
