= Department of Industries and Commerce =

Defunct New Zealand government department

Agency overview
- Formed: 1894
- Dissolved: 1972
- Superseding agency: Department of Trade and Industry
- Minister responsible: Minister of Industries and Commerce

The Department of Industries and Commerce was a government department in New Zealand that assisted with the export of goods to overseas markets, examined trade practices and administered industrial manufacturing.

== History ==
=== Establishment ===
The government set up an Office of Industries and Commerce in 1894 for the purpose of 'finding new markets for New Zealand produce and extend existing areas' as well as to 'give limited assistance to any branch of local commerce and industry requiring help'. At the time the produce for market was mostly agricultural instead of manufactured. For the department's first few decades of operation its main concern was agriculture.

=== Functions and responsibilities ===
Until 1919 it became a department and had various responsibility areas for agriculture, tourism, health resorts and publicity before its focus became more firmly in the industrial field. For a period it housed a Board of Trade which reported on supply and demand and made inquiries on questionable prices and undesirable trade practices. After the Second World War, the government and the department set up an information service for manufacturers. The department took over the government statistics function in 1931 doing so until an independent Department of Statistics was created in 1957.

=== Disestablishment ===
In October 1972 the department was superseded by the Department of Trade and Industry after the passing of the Trade and Industry Amendment Act, 1972.

== Department heads ==
Below is a list of Secretaries of Industries and Commerce:

- Thomas Donne, 1901–1919
- John Collins, 1919–1935
- Louis John Schmitt, 1935–1946
- George Clinkard, 1946–1950
- Val Marshall, 1950-1957
- Leonard A. Atkinson, 1957–1958 (acting)
- Bill Sutch, 1958–1965
- Jim Moriarty, 1965–1972
