= 2004 Israel–New Zealand passport scandal =

Identity fraud by suspected Mossad agents

The 2004 Israel–New Zealand passport scandal was an incident of passport fraud in July 2004 that led New Zealand to take diplomatic sanctions against Israel. High-level contacts between the two countries were suspended after two Israeli citizens suspected of being Mossad agents, Uriel Kelman and Eli Cara, were caught trying to fraudulently acquire a New Zealand passport using the identity of a man with cerebral palsy. Prime Minister Helen Clark declared that New Zealand government viewed the acts carried out by Kelman and Cara as "not only utterly unacceptable but also a breach of New Zealand sovereignty and international law."

== History ==
Howard Way, a Lynfield general practitioner, testified that a man asked him to witness his passport application because he was going to Australia to get married. Way said the man was "calm and gave me no reason not to believe him. I filled out the form." A fake post office box and voicemail phone service were set up in the name of a man, whose birth certificate was used in the passport application. New Zealand Department of Internal Affairs official Ian Tingey detected the irregularity and called the applicant, who had a Canadian or American accent. "When I quizzed him on his accent his explanation to me was he had not travelled or held a New Zealand passport before but had spent a lot of time in New Zealand with Canadian friends and family." Tingey contacted the father of the man whose identity was being used and realised the application was a fraud. The police bugged Kelman's and Cara's phones, set up a sting operation, and caught Kelman and Cara in March 2004.

The day after Kelman and Cara's arrest, Jewish New Zealander Anthony "Tony" Resnick abruptly left New Zealand for Hong Kong, leaving his position as a health lecturer at the Auckland University of Technology.

Kelman and Cara both plead guilty to attempting to illegally obtain a New Zealand passport at the High Court in Auckland in July 2004.

The case was presided over by Judge Chris Field. Cara was represented by Grant Illingworth and Kelman was represented by Nigel Faigan. Illingworth and Faigan unsuccessfully tried to get the case dismissed early by saying that pre-trial publicity was "highly prejudicial."

Kelman and Cara denied membership in Mossad but pleaded guilty to trying to enter the country illegally and working with organised criminal gangs. They were sentenced to six months in jail and ordered to pay US$32,500 to a cerebral palsy charity.

After serving either two or three months they were deported. Cara, who visited New Zealand 24 times between October 2000 and March 2004, claims he was working as a travel agent.

== Repercussions ==
Prime Minister Clark cancelled a planned visit to New Zealand in August by Israeli President Moshe Katzav, delayed approval for a new Israeli ambassador to New Zealand, and called the case "far more than simple criminal behaviour by two individuals" which "seriously strained our relationship." Israeli Foreign Minister Silvan Shalom expressed sorrow, and said that Israel would work to repair the relationship. Dr. Alon Liel, former Director-General of the Israeli Foreign Ministry, said that Israel must protest the diplomatic sanctions, "for if not, it's a silent admission that the two men worked for the Mossad."

The sanctions included suspending official visits to Israel and foreign ministry contacts, requiring visas for Israeli officials to enter New Zealand. Clark said, "The ball is in Israel's court as to where it wants to move from here. Three months ago we asked for an apology and an explanation. That has not been forthcoming."

Clark said that an official inquiry that began after the arrests revealed that an Israeli passport factory had been issuing New Zealand passports. "We turned up a very small number that emanated from what we believe to be Israeli intelligence. Those passports have been cancelled and it would be futile to attempt to use them."

=== Antisemitism ===
Jewish graves in Wellington were subsequently vandalised with Swastikas and Nazi slogans carved into and around 16 Jewish graves. The head of the New Zealand Jewish community, David Zwartz, said, "there is a direct connection between the very strong expressions against Israel and people here feeling they can take it out on Jews. It seems to me Israel-bashing one day, Jew-bashing the next day." Clark's somewhat dismissed that there was a link between the government's response and the vandalism.

== Reconciliation ==
On 26 June 2005, Foreign Minister Shalom sent a letter of apology to the New Zealand government saying, "In this context, we wish to express our regret for the activities which resulted in the arrest and conviction of two Israel citizens in New Zealand on criminal charges and apologize for the involvement of Israeli citizens in such activities. Israel commits itself to taking steps to prevent a recurrence of similar incidents in the future." Diplomatic relations were fully re-established on 30 August 2005 when Naftali Tamir presented his credentials, which were accepted, to Governor-General Dame Silvia Cartwright before a guard of honour. The Foreign Minister's deputy director for Asia and the Pacific, Amos Nadav, said, "We are happy the crisis is behind us and look ahead to the future."

When Shalom and Jan Henderson, the New Zealand ambassador to Turkey, met for reconciliation talks on 26 October 2005, an Israeli government statement noted that the meeting was the first between high ranking New Zealand and Israel officials "since the incident with the Mossad". Israel's Foreign Ministry spokesman Mark Regev denied that it was an official admission of Mossad activity in New Zealand and said the "incident with the Mossad" should have been in inverted commas to reflect that the espionage is alleged only by the New Zealand government. "We have never said more than we have said in the case. This issue has been solved in a satisfactory way with the New Zealand government."

Australian Jewish News credited NZ MP Taito Phillip Field, a Jewish-Samoan political novice, of acting as a bridge between the two governments when he visited Nissan Krupsky, the former Israeli ambassador to New Zealand, in Israel in December. AJN reported that Field met with Israel's Foreign Ministry officials secretly because of the NZ ban on meetings between the government's officials. New Zealand Foreign Minister Phil Goff denied Field played any significant role in overcoming the diplomatic impasse on 1 July. "It wasn't a high-level visit. What he was doing was in a private capacity to see people he knew in Israel and I didn't raise any objection to him going." According to AJN, "While Field's visit eventually turned out to have critical diplomatic significance, it was described as private so as not to be seen as violating the sanctions imposed by Clark. Nonetheless, throughout his visit Field served as middleman between the two Governments, maintaining phone contacts with Wellington in order to secure Clark's approval for the start of the Ankara talks." Foreign Minister Goff denied that the talks between Israel's FM official Michael Ronen and Ambassador Henderson were a direct result of Field's visit.

Nadav said New Zealand once "had excellent warm and friendly relations before and we wish to restore them to that same intensity. Yet we don't want to rush things by inundating New Zealand with ideas and programmes."

== See also ==
- New Zealand passport#Incidents
- Assassination of Mahmoud Al-Mabhouh. Mossad assassination using forged British, Irish, French, Australian and German passports
