= Organised and Financial Crime Agency of New Zealand =

National Organised Crime Group

Agency overview
- Formed: April 2017
- Preceding agencies: 1990–2008 preceded by the Serious Fraud Office (SFO); 2008-2017 Organised and Financial Crime Agency of New Zealand (OFCANZ)

Jurisdictional structure
- National agency: New Zealand
- Operations jurisdiction: New Zealand
- Primary governing body: New Zealand Government
- Secondary governing body: New Zealand Police

Operational structure
- Agency executives: Malcolm Burgess, Director; Richard Chambers, Commissioner of Police

Website
- https://www.police.govt.nz/careers/police-groups/national-organised-crime-group

The National Organised Crime Group, the original name was Organised and Financial Crime Agency of New Zealand (OFCANZ), which was renamed and merged into the New Zealand Police in April 2017. The group's stated objective is to "disrupt and combat organised crime".

The Fifth Labour Government in 2007 announced the intention to create the agency, saying it would replace the Serious Fraud Office. OFCANZ was formed on 1 July 2008 (though in December 2008, the new National Prime Minister John Key said that the Serious Fraud Office would not be abolished).

The agency led its first raid on 28 October 2009, serving search warrants on members of the Tribesmen Motorcycle Club in Northland.

== See also ==
- New Zealand Police
