= Aziz Choudry =

Activist (1966–2021)

Aziz Choudry (23 June 1966 – 26 May 2021), originally from New Zealand, was a scholar and Canadian activist and the former coordinator of GATT Watchdog, a Canadian non-governmental organization that monitored the activities of the World Trade Organization.

He was a prolific scholar-activist internationally recognized for his scholarship and solidarity with migrant, Indigenous, Palestinian, and anti-colonial struggles. Choudry was an associate professor in the Department of Integrated Studies in Education at McGill University and an organizer of popular education initiatives through the Immigrant Workers Centre in Montreal. He was a Founding Board member of Global Justice Ecology Project and served on the Board from 2003 to 2021. He was an editor for Interface: A Journal for and About Social Movements between 2011 and 2016.

He died in Johannesburg on 26 May 2021.

== Biography ==
Choudry was born in the United Kingdom to Mohammad Yaqoob Chaudhry, a Pakistani emigrant, who migrated to London in 1963. Yaqoob belonged to the persecuted Ahmadiyya Muslim community. Aziz's mother, Mary Cummins converted to Islam and changed her name to Mahmooda Choudry after marrying Aziz's father.

Aziz went to Whitgift High School in Croydon, England. He left his parents house at the age of 17 and moved to New Zealand.

== Surveillance by New Zealand Security Intelligence Service ==
In 1996, two SIS agents broke into the home of Aziz Choudry. Choudry was an organiser with GATT Watchdog, which was holding a public forum and rally against an APEC (Asia-Pacific Economic Cooperation) Trade Ministers meeting hosted in Christchurch. It was one of the high-profile cases of misconduct by SIS that went to Court. The Court of Appeal ruled that the SIS had exceeded their legislated powers of interception. Parliament later amended the SIS Act to give the SIS powers of entry into private property.

== Books ==
Choudry's books include:

- Fight Back: Workplace Justice for Immigrants (with Jill Hanley, Steve Jordan, Eric Shragge, and Martha Stiegman, Fernwood Publishing, 2009)
- Learning from the Ground Up: Global Perspectives on Social Movements and Knowledge Production (edited with Dip Kapoor, Palgrave Macmillan, 2010)
- Organize!: Building from the Local for Global Justice (edited with Jill Hanley and Eric Shragge, Between the Lines and PM Press, 2012)
- NGOization: Complicity, Contradictions and Prospects (edited with Dip Kapoor, Zed Books, 2013)
- Learning Activism: The Intellectual Life of Contemporary Social Movements (University of Toronto Press, 2015)
- Just Work? Migrant Workers' Struggles Today (edited with Mondli Hlatshwayo, Pluto Press, 2016)
- Unfree Labour? Struggles of Migrant and Immigrant Workers in Canada (edited with Adrian A. Smith, PM Press, 2016)
- Reflections on Knowledge, Learning and Social Movements: History’s Schools (edited with Salim Vally, Routledge, 2018)
- Activists and the Surveillance State: Learning from Repression (edited, Pluto Press, 2019)
- The University and Social Justice: Struggles across the Globe (edited with Salim Vally, Pluto Press, 2020)
