= Intelligence and Security Committee (New Zealand) =

The Intelligence and Security Committee (ISC) is a statutory select committee of the New Zealand Parliament, currently governed under the Intelligence and Security Act (2017). It is the parliamentary oversight committee that manages New Zealand's intelligence agencies and examines issues relating to their efficacy and efficiency, budgetary matters, and policies.

The ISC consists of the Prime Minister, the Leader of the Opposition, two or three (currently three) further MPs nominated by the Prime Minister, and two further MP nominated by the Leader of the Opposition. The committee meets much more rarely than ordinary Select Committees, however — according to some claims in 2006, for less than an hour each year.

== Membership, 54th Parliament ==
The following table lists the membership of the committee during the 54th Parliament:

New Zealand House Intelligence and Security Committee
Majority: Government (4/3)
Party	Member	Electorate
National	Christopher Luxon (Chairperson)	Botany
National	Judith Collins	Papakura
NZ First	Winston Peters	List (1)
ACT	Brooke van Velden	Tāmaki
Labour	Chris Hipkins	Remutaka
Labour	Priyanca Radhakrishnan	List (15)
Green	Teanau Tuiono	List (5)

== Membership, 53rd Parliament ==
The following table lists the membership of the committee during the 53rd Parliament:

New Zealand House Intelligence and Security Committee
Majority: Government (4/3)
Party	Member	Electorate
Labour	Chris Hipkins (Chairperson)	Remutaka
Labour	Andrew Little	List (7)
Labour	Nanaia Mahuta	Hauraki-Waikato
Green	James Shaw	List (2)
National	Christopher Luxon	Botany
National	Gerry Brownlee	List (2)
National	Nicola Willis	List (13)
