= Far-right politics in New Zealand =

Overview of far-right movements in New Zealand

Far-right politics in New Zealand has been present in New Zealand in the form of the organised advocacy of fascist, far-right, neo-Nazi, white supremacist, and antisemitic views by various groups, although fascism has never gained a strong foothold.

== Early antisemitism ==
In 1892, there were objections raised in parliament and by representatives of workers against a planned arrival of 500 Russian Jewish immigrants. The reason for this is most likely not because they were Jews. This was an isolated incident of what appeared to be antisemitism in New Zealand. In contrast, "the Jews in New Zealand had enjoyed a freedom unequalled anywhere else in the world. Before the immigration protests, no anti-semitism had ever appeared upon the surface. On the contrary, it could be stated that New Zealanders were pro-semitic." Further indication that the feeling was not particularly strong is evidenced by the fact that Julius Vogel, a practising Jew, became Premier in 1873. Vogel did, however, suffer jibes about his faith, and political cartoonists frequently employed various Jewish stereotypes against him. The fact that he served as treasurer was particularly played upon, with stereotypes of Jewish bankers and moneylenders being brought out. However, none of this antisemitism was conducted in an organised fashion, being simply the views of individuals rather than any sort of political movement.

New Zealander Arthur Desmond wrote Might Is Right which was published in 1896.

== 20th century ==
In the early 20th century, another more disciplined strain of anti-Semitism crystallised around the social credit theory. This theory, set out by the British engineer C. H. Douglas, was highly critical of bankers and financiers, believing that debt was being used to undermine people's rights. Douglas toured New Zealand in 1934 and expounded his view that Jews were involved in a global conspiracy to control finance. An independent Social Credit Party was founded in 1953, but had ceased to be a vehicle for anti-semitism by the 1970s. In the late 1970s the party became concerned about infiltration by the anti-semitic New Zealand League of Rights and ejected members with racist views.

Many anti-Semites later supported the League of Rights, an organisation originating in Australia that also had links to the social credit movement. In the 1970s the League organised speaking tours in support of apartheid regimes in South Africa and Rhodesia, and advocated a tax revolt to break a "Zionist plot".

Unlike some countries, New Zealand did not have any notable fascist organisations in the first half of the 20th century, although the New Zealand Legion was accused of having fascist leanings. There were no real equivalents to the British Union of Fascists or the Silver Legion of America, although certain individuals, notably Lionel Terry and Arthur Nelson Field, promoted white supremacist ideals.

In the post-war period, however, a number of fascist organisations became active. In 1968, the fascist activist Colin King-Ansell was jailed for an attack on a synagogue. The following year, he established the National Socialist Party of New Zealand, and contested a number of elections under its banner. Later, he led a group called the National Socialist White People's Party, modelled after the party established by George Lincoln Rockwell in the United States. In 1977, King-Ansell was convicted of racial incitement and jailed for three months for distributing several thousand antisemitic leaflets. The sentence was reduced to a $400 fine following an appeal in 1979.

Another fascist group established in this period was the New Zealand National Front (NZNF). The National Front was established by Brian Thompson of Ashburton in 1968, although its initial operations were erratic. Eventually, in 1989, a new organisation called the Conservative Front (founded by Anton Foljambe) absorbed the National Front and adopted its name. The now-defunct New Zealand Democratic Nationalist Party also dates from this time period.

In 1981, a group called the New Force was founded. One of its founders and a member of its directorates was Kerry Bolton, who was also involved in the NZNF. In 1983, the New Force was renamed the Nationalist Workers Party. In 1983 the party called for the expulsion of Pacific peoples. In 1984 an attempt to distribute white supremacist pamphlets in Auckland led to threats of violence. The pamphlets were seized by police and the party's leaders threatened with arrest.

In 1981, a visit by South Africa's rugby team generated huge controversy due to South Africa's apartheid policies at the time. Colin King-Ansell and a number of other fascist figures took part in counter-demonstrations against anti-tour protesters.

In the 1990s, there was something of a resurgence in New Zealand fascism. A number of gangs with fascist views, notably Unit 88, gained considerable public attention. Colin King-Ansell was once again involved, although he distanced himself from Unit 88 when the media focused on it. Later, in March 1997, King-Ansell founded the New Zealand Fascist Union, which described itself as being more closely modelled on Mussolini's Italy and Perón's Argentina than on Nazi Germany. The Fascist Union at one time claimed to have 500 members, the necessary number for official party registration, but the Union was never registered.

== 21st century ==
In October 2004, the National Front held a small protest in Wellington to support retaining the current New Zealand flag. They were met by an 800-strong counter-demonstration organised by the MultiCultural Aotearoa coalition and driven away. According to The New Zealand Herald, National Front leader Kyle Chapman complained the following day of "insufficient police protection".

In 2009 Chapman established the Right Wing Resistance (RWR), a neo-Nazi skinhead organization. The organisation engaged in vigilante street patrols and distributed racist flyers in cities throughout New Zealand. During the 2011 New Zealand general election the group disrupted candidate meetings while wearing military-style uniforms.

Brenton Harrison Tarrant, the Australian-born perpetrator of the Christchurch mosque shootings at Al Noor Mosque and Linwood Islamic Centre in Christchurch, New Zealand, was an admitted fascist who admired Oswald Mosley, the leader of the British fascist organization British Union of Fascists (BUF), who is also quoted in the shooter's manifesto The Great Replacement (named after the French far-right theory of the same name).

According to the sociologist Paul Spoonley, some notable far right groups in New Zealand as of 2020 have included the neo-Nazi body-builder group Wargus Christi, the White nationalist Dominion Movement and Action Zealandia groups.

According to a Stuff report, an alleged co-founder of the Dominion Movement was a New Zealand Defence Force soldier under the pseudonym Johann Wolfe, who was facing a court martial in 2020 for sharing information with an undisclosed group. In August 2025, the soldier known as Wolfe pled guilty to attempted espionage during a court martial, and was sentenced to two years of detention at the military prison in Burnham Military Camp. Wolfe acknowledged supplying sensitive material including maps and photographs of military bases, access codes, telephone directories and personal military identification to an undercover New Zealand agent, whom he believed was a foreign spy in return for asylum. During his sentencing, the defendant acknowledged being a founding member of the Dominion Movement and its successor, Action Zealandia. He also possessed Tarrant's manifesto and banned footage of the Christchurch mosque shootings.

Action Zealandia is the successor to the Dominion Movement, which has opposed alleged Chinese political influence in New Zealand, the Global Compact for Migration, and denied the indigeneity of Māori to New Zealand. According to Newsroom journalist Marc Daalder, Action Zealandia was linked to at least three potential crimes in March 2020 including a member named Sam Brittenden making an online threat against the Al Noor Mosque in Christchurch, posting a leaked New Zealand Police Financial Intelligence unit document, and alleged plans to start a terror cell and purchase weapons from like-minded groups such as the Atomwaffen Division.

In August 2021 journalist and politician Elliot Weir of student newspaper Critic Te Ārohi reported an under-cover investigation of Action Zealandia, including their plans to infiltrate the New Zealand National and New Zealand Social Credit parties and plans to appeal to a broader group of people.

Political experts have said that one reason New Zealand has not seen the growth of a far-right populist party is because the moderate New Zealand First takes the political space that a far right party would naturally have (i.e. anti-immigration policies).

== Notable organisations and people ==
=== Organisations ===
- National Front (1968–2019)
- National Socialist Party (1969–1980)
- Kiwis Against Further Immigration (1990s)
- New Zealand League of Rights
- Nationalist Workers Party
- Unit 88
- Right Wing Resistance
- Black Order
- Dominion Movement (2018–2019)
- Action Zealandia (2019– )
- Wargus Christi

=== People ===
- Colin King-Ansell (born 1947)
- Kerry Bolton (born 1956)
- Kelvyn Alp (born 27 March 1971)
- Kyle Chapman (born 27 April 1971)
- Thomas Sewell (Born in New Zealand, in 1993)

== See also ==
- Far-right politics in Australia
- Anti-Māori sentiment
