= COVID-19 alert levels in New Zealand =

Four-tier alert level restrictions system

A four-tier alert level restrictions system was in place in during the COVID-19 pandemic in New Zealand between March 2020 and December 2021, with levels 3 and 4 being forms of lockdown. In level 1, there were no restrictions; in level 2, there were limits on gatherings; in level 3, only purposeful travel was allowed and there were strict limits on gatherings; and in level 4, only essential travel was allowed and gatherings were banned.

The alert level system was replaced with the COVID-19 Protection Framework, known as the "traffic light" system, which uses vaccination rates to determine the level of restrictions needed. The traffic light system began at 11:59 pm on 2 December 2021.

The country may return to the alert level system if a future major outbreak occurred that necessitated it, such as a new vaccine-resistant variant of SARS-CoV-2 (the virus that causes COVID-19).

== Alert levels ==
Alert levels are cumulative – each level includes the restrictions of the level below it.

Note that during each lockdown, minor tweaks are made to the exact parameters of each alert level, meaning that alert levels with the same numerical value are not directly comparable across timeframes.

The levels are as follows:

=== Level 1 – Prepare ===
COVID-19 is uncontrolled overseas. The disease is contained in New Zealand and there are sporadic imported cases, but isolated household transmission could be occurring.

- Border entry measures to minimise risk of importing COVID-19 cases.
- Intensive testing for COVID-19.
- Rapid contact tracing of any positive case.
- People arriving in New Zealand without symptoms of COVID-19 go into a managed isolation facility for at least 14 days.
- People arriving in New Zealand with symptoms of COVID-19 or who test positive after arrival go into a quarantine facility and are unable to leave their room for at least 14 days.
- Mandatory self-isolation may be applied.
- Schools and workplaces are open, and must operate safely.
- No restrictions on personal movement or gatherings.
- Stay home if you are sick, report flu-like symptoms.
- Wash and dry hands, cough into elbow, do not touch your face.
- Businesses and public transport must display QR codes to allow for contact tracing.
- Face coverings are required on public transport and aircraft, but not school buses or Cook Strait ferries. Children under 12 are exempt along with passengers in taxis or rideshare services and people with disabilities or mental health conditions.

=== Level 2 – Reduce ===
The disease is contained, but the risk of community transmission remains. Household transmission could be occurring, and there are single or isolated cluster outbreaks.

- People can connect with friends and family, go shopping, or travel domestically, but should follow public health guidance.
- Physical distancing of two metres from people you do not know when out in public is recommended, with one metre physical distancing in controlled environments like workplaces unless other measures are in place.
- No more than 100 people at indoor or outdoor gatherings (subject to any lower limit, e.g. fire regulations).
- Sport and recreation activities are allowed, subject to conditions on gatherings, contact tracing, and – where practical – physical distancing.
- Public venues can open but must comply with public health measures.
- Health and disability care services operate as normally as possible.
- Businesses can open to the public, but must follow public health guidance including in relation to physical distancing and contact tracing. Alternative ways of working encouraged where possible (e.g. remote working, shift-based working, physical distancing, staggering meal breaks, flexible leave).
- Schools, early childhood education and tertiary education providers can open with appropriate public health measures in place.
- People at higher risk of severe illness from COVID-19 (e.g. those with underlying medical conditions, especially if not well controlled, and seniors) are encouraged to take additional precautions when leaving home. They may work, if they agree with their employer that they can do so safely.

=== Level 3 – Restrict ===
There is a high risk the disease is not contained. Community transmission might be happening. New clusters may emerge but can be controlled through testing and contact tracing.

- People instructed to stay home in their support bubble other than for essential personal movement – including to go to work, school if they have to or for local recreation.
- Physical distancing of two metres outside home (including on public transport), or one metre In controlled environments like schools and workplaces.
- People must stay within their immediate household bubble, but can expand this to reconnect with close family / whānau, or bring in caregivers, or support isolated people. This extended bubble should remain exclusive.
- Schools (years 1 to 10) and Early Childhood Education centres can safely open, but have limited capacity. Children should learn at home if possible.
- People must work from home unless that is not possible.
- Businesses can open premises, but cannot physically interact with customers.
- Low risk local recreation activities are allowed.
- Public venues are closed (e.g. libraries, museums, cinemas, food courts, gyms, pools, playgrounds, markets).
- Gatherings of up to 10 people are allowed but only for wedding services, funerals and tangihanga. Physical distancing and public health measures must be maintained.
- Healthcare services use virtual, non-contact consultations where possible.
- Inter-regional travel is highly limited (e.g. for essential workers, with limited exemptions for others).
- People at high risk of severe illness (older people and those with existing medical conditions) are encouraged to stay at home where possible, and take additional precautions when leaving home. They may choose to continue to work.

=== Level 4 – Lockdown ===
It is likely the disease is not contained. Sustained and intensive community transmission is occurring, and there are widespread outbreaks and new clusters.

- People must stay at home (in their bubble) other than for essential personal movement.
- Safe recreational activity is allowed in local area.
- Travel is severely limited.
- All gatherings cancelled and all public venues closed.
- Businesses closed except for essential services (e.g. supermarkets, pharmacies, clinics, petrol stations) and lifeline utilities.
- Educational facilities closed.
- Rationing of supplies and requisitioning of facilities possible.
- Reprioritisation of healthcare services.
- Prior to 29 August 2021, whitebaiting and fishing with the exception of Māori customary fishing rights was not allowed under Level 4. These restrictions were since eased.

== History ==
=== 2020 ===
On 21 March 2020, Prime Minister Jacinda Ardern announced the introduction of a country-wide alert level system, similar to the existing fire warning systems. There are four levels, with 1 being the least risk of infection and 4 the highest. At the time of the announcement, New Zealand was at level 2. Each level brings added restrictions on activities or movements. Each region can have an individual alert level based on the severity of their own infections, and these levels can be changed at any time.

At the time of Ardern's announcement, New Zealand was at alert level 2. Ardern announced on 23 March that, effective immediately, New Zealand would be at alert level 3, moving to level 4 at 11:59 pm on 25 March. On 20 April, Ardern announced that New Zealand would move to alert level 3 at 11:59 pm on 27 April, with businesses and schools being allowed to have employees enter the premises during the last week of alert level 4 to prepare the facility for the transition to alert level 3.

The country remained at alert level 3 for at least two weeks, with the decision of whether to move down to level 2 made on 11 May. On 11 May, it was announced that New Zealand would enter alert level 2 from 11:59 pm on 13 May, lifting lockdown restrictions while maintaining physical distancing in public and for private gatherings with more than ten people. On 8 June, Ardern announced that the country would enter alert level 1 at 11:59 pm that night, lifting the remaining restrictions.

After new cases of community transmission were detected on 11 August, New Zealand was moved to alert level 2 and Auckland to level 3 at noon on 12 August; Auckland moved down to level "2.5", a modified version of level 2 with further limitations on public gatherings and mandated mask wearing on public transport, at 11:59 pm on 30 August. New Zealand moved to level 1 on 21 September at 11:59 pm while Auckland moved to level 2 on 23 September at 11:59 pm. Auckland moved down to level 1 on 7 October at 11:59 pm.

=== 2021 ===
On 14 February 2021, after the new community cases were detected in Auckland, Auckland moved to alert level 3 at 11:59 pm, while the rest of New Zealand moved to alert level 2. Auckland moved down a level to alert level 2, while the rest of New Zealand moved to alert level one, at 11:59 pm on 17 February. Auckland moved down to level 1 on 22 February at 11:59 pm. Auckland moved up to level 3, while the rest of New Zealand moved to level 2 on 28 February at 6:00 am. Auckland moved down to level 2, while the rest of New Zealand moved to level 1 at 6:00 am on 7 March. On 12 March, Auckland moved back to level 1 at midday.

On 23 June 2021, the Wellington region including the Wairarapa and the Kāpiti Coast moved to Alert Level 2 at 6pm after a Sydney man travelled to the region while infected the SARS-CoV-2 Delta variant. The Wellington lockdown was scheduled to last until 11:59 pm on 27 June. On 27 June, Cabinet extended Wellington's Alert Level 2 lockdown for 48 hours until 11:59 pm on 29 June. On 29 June, Wellington moved down to level 1 at 11:59 pm.

On 17 August 2021, after a report of a new community case presumed to be infected with the Delta variant of the virus, Ardern announced that New Zealand would move to alert level 4 at 11:59 pm. New Zealand is expected to be at level 4 for a minimum of three days, while Auckland and the Coromandel Peninsula for 7 days. On 23 August 2021, Ardern announced that most of New Zealand will remain at alert level 4 until 11:59 pm on 27 August, while Auckland will remain at alert level 4 until 11:59 pm on 31 August. On 27 August, Ardern announced that New Zealand will remain on Alert Level 4 until 11:59 pm on 31 August. While Auckland and the Northland Region will remain on Alert Level 4 for at least two more weeks, the rest of the country will move into Alert Level 3 from 1 September 2021.

On 30 August, the Government hinted that Northland's alert level could be lowered to Alert Level 3 at 11:59 pm on 2 September 2021 if wastewater testing confirmed no traces of COVID-19. On 2 September, Ardern confirmed that Northland would move to Alert Level 3 at 11:59 pm on 2 September since wastewater testing within the region had not detected COVID-19. Checkpoints will be set up between Northland and the Auckland Region, which remained under Level 4.

On 6 September, Ardern confirmed that all of New Zealand except Auckland will move to Alert Level 2 at 11:59pm on 7 September. However, new Level 2 restrictions will be introduced including mandatory mask wearing at most public venues, recommended mask wearing for school students above the age of 12 years, a 50-person limit at indoor venues, and a 100-person limit at outdoor venues.

On 13 September, Ardern confirmed that Auckland would remain on Alert Level 4 until 11:59 pm at 21 September; with five week period marking the longest that the region has been under Level 4. In addition, the rest of New Zealand would remain on Alert Level 2 until at least 21 September.

On 20 September, Ardern confirmed that Auckland would move down to Alert Level 3 at 11:59 pm on 21 September while the rest of the country will remain on Alert Level 2. Event limit restrictions were also relaxed for areas under Level 2, with 100 people being allowed in indoor hospitality venues. In addition, a "bespoke" lockdown requirement was established in Whakatīwai, Waikato due to recent community cases there. Whakatīwai was given a Section 70-stay-at-home order for the next five days while the Health Ministry conducted contact tracing.

On 22 September, Director-General Ashley Bloomfield confirmed that Waikato's Whakatīwai region would be moving into Alert Level 3 with the rest of Auckland due to the high level of testing and negative community cases in the region.

On 3 October, an Alert Level three lockdown was reinstated in several parts of Waikato including Raglan, Huntly, Ngāruawāhia and Hamilton from midnight 4 October after two community cases were detected. In response to the Waikato lockdown, Ardern stated that lockdowns would continue unless vaccination rates increased nationally.

On 4 October, Ardern announced a three-stage strategy to move Auckland out of lockdown. The stages were:

- The first stage allowed people to connect with relatives outdoors, up to a maximum of 10 people and two households at a time; the resumption of early childhood education for everyone, and people to move around Auckland for recreation such as beach visits and hunting.
- The second stage allowed retailers to reopen with face masks and physical distancing requirements; allowed public facilities such as libraries and museums to reopen; and raise the maximum number of people able to meet outdoors to 25, removing the two-household limit.
- The (unused) third stage allowed hospitality businesses to reopen with special restrictions including compulsory seating, separation, and a 50-person limit; the reopening of close contact businesses like hairdressers with mask use and physical distancing; and raised the limit on gatherings to 50 people.

On 5 October, Auckland moved into stage one of the Government's three-stage strategy at 11:59 pm on 5 October.

On 7 October, COVID-19 Response Minister Hipkins extended the Waikato Level 3 boundary extension to include more parts of the region including the Waitomo (including Te Kūiti), Waipa, and the Ōtorohanga districts." The boundary also covers the coast south to Mokau, then east along the northern Pureora Forest Park, and north to include Te Awamutu, Karapiro and Cambridge to meet the existing boundary. The following day, Alert Level 3 restrictions reinstated in the Northland Region after an Auckland woman who tested positive for COVID-19 used false information to obtain travel documents and spent several days in the region.

On 11 October, Auckland's Level 3 lockdown was extended for another week, with students being asked not to return to class next Monday. The Government has indicated that Alert level restrictions in Waikato and Northland will be lowered from Alert Level 3 to Alert Level 2 on 14 October at 11:59 pm.

On 18 October, Ardern confirmed that Auckland would remain on Alert Level 3 for at least two more weeks. Waikato would remain on Alert Level 3 due to further cases and positive wastewater testing results. Northland will remain on Alert Level 3 due to continuing community transmissions.

On 1 November, Ardern announced that the Waikato region will move down to step 2 of Alert Level 3 at 11:59 pm on 2 November. This allows retailers to operate with face masks and physical distance; increases the number of people at outdoor gatherings to 25; and removes the two-household restriction. Auckland will move down to step 2 of Alert Level 3 at 11:59pm on 9 November.

On 2 November, COVID-19 Response Minister Hipkins placed the northern part of the Northland Region under an Alert Level 3 lockdown after authorities were unable to find any epidemiological links for two community cases.

On 8 November, Ardern announced that Auckland will move down to step 2 of Alert Level 3 from 10 November. Retail stores, museums and zoos will be allowed to reopen. Outdoor gatherings, funerals, weddings, and civil unions will be allowed with an increased 25 person limit. The Far North District, which was put into level 3 in the middle of last week, will also move down to alert level 2 on 12 November. Ardern also indicated that Cabinet expects to move Auckland into the COVID Protection Framework from 29 November 2021.

On 22 November, Ardern confirmed that New Zealand would enter the COVID-19 Protection Framework "traffic light system" from 3 December, ending the previous "alert level system." Auckland and areas with low vaccination would start on the "Red setting" (compulsory record-keeping, scanning, face masks, and limits on public gatherings) while the rest of the country would start on the "Orange setting" (Public facilities, education providers, workplaces and specified community events allowed to reopen subject to capacity limits while regional boundary restrictions are eased). In addition, hairdressers and barbers in Auckland were allowed to reopen from 25 November.

== Timeline ==
Date (Note: Changes in alert levels typically occur at 11:59 pm the night before.)	Alert Level					
Date	New Zealand	Wellington Region	Northland Region (Note: From 2 November, Northern Northland only.)	Upper Hauraki	North West Waikato (Note: From 4 October 2021 comprising Raglan, Te Kauwhata, Huntly, Ngāruawāhia, Hamilton City and some surrounding areas. This area was extended on 9 October to include Waitomo District, including Te Kuiti, Waipa District and Ōtorohanga District.)	Auckland Region
21 March 2020	2					
23 March 2020	▲3					
26 March 2020	▲4					
28 April 2020	▼3					
14 May 2020	▼2					
9 June 2020	▼1					
12 August 2020	▲2					▲3
31 August 2020	2					▼2.5
22 September 2020	▼1					2.5
24 September 2020	1					▼2
8 October 2020	1					▼1
15 February 2021	▲2					▲3
18 February 2021	▼1					▼2
23 February 2021	1					▼1
28 February 2021	▲2					▲3
7 March 2021	▼1					▼2
12 March 2021	1					▼1
24 June 2021	1	▲2	1			
30 June 2021	1	▼1	1			
18 August 2021	▲4					
1 September 2021	▼3		4	▼3		4
3 September 2021	3		▼3	3		4
8 September 2021	▼2					4
22 September 2021	2			▲3	2	▼3
26 September 2021	2			▼2	2	3
4 October 2021	2				▲3	3
9 October 2021	2		▲3	2	3	3
20 October 2021	2		▼2	2	3	3
2 November 2021	2		▲3	2	3	3
11 November 2021	2		▼2	2	3	3
16 November 2021	2		2	2	▼2	3

== Essential services ==
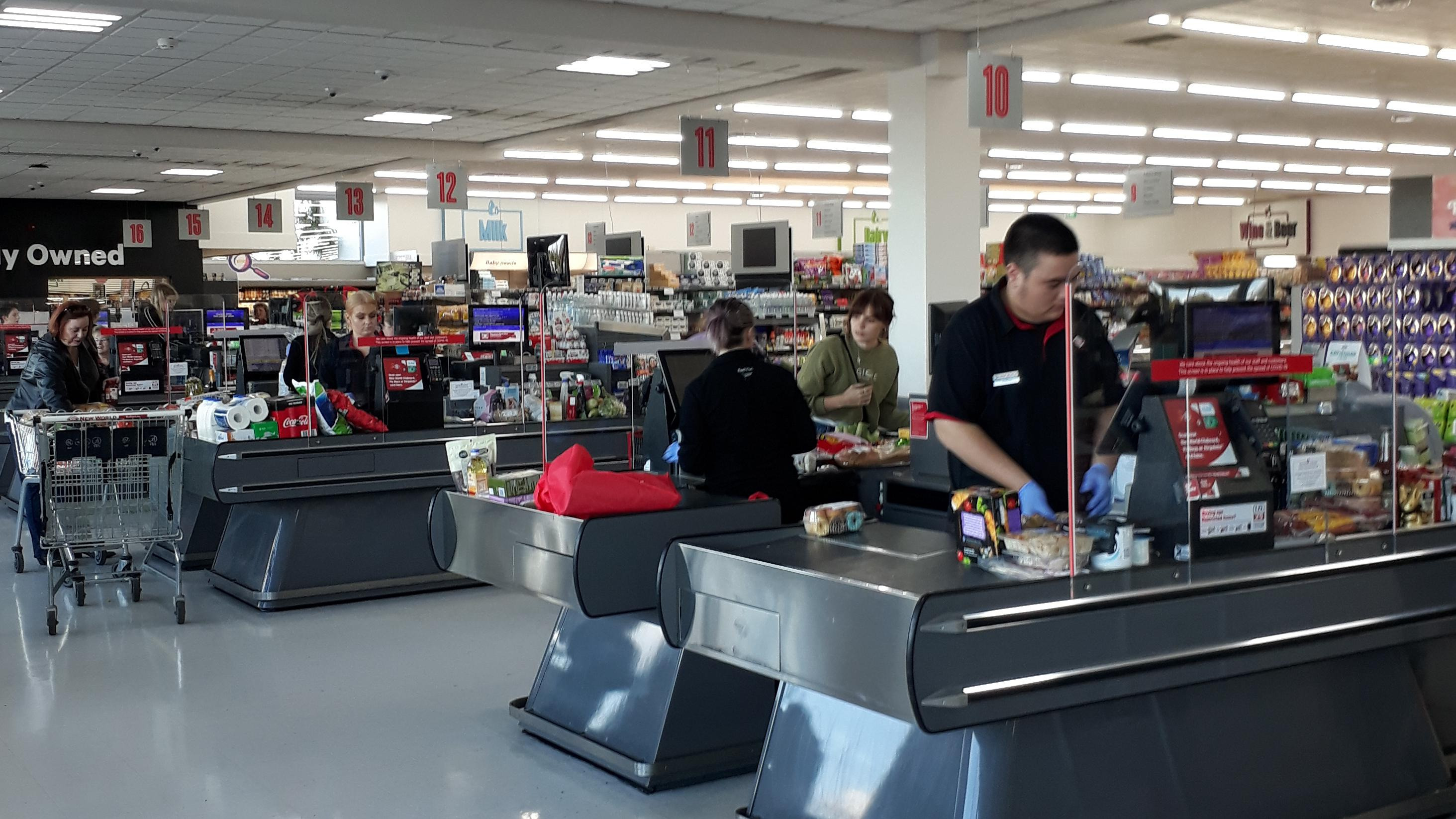
Supermarket staff behind protective screens and wearing gloves on 31 March 2020

The "essential services" referenced in alert level 4 include:

- Accommodation
  - Any entity that provides accommodation services for essential workers, isolation/quarantine, and emergency housing
  - Retirement villages
- Border
  - New Zealand Customs Service, Immigration New Zealand, and the Ministry for Primary Industries
- Building and construction
  - Any entity involved in building and construction related to essential services and critical infrastructure, including those in the supply and support chain
  - Any entity involved in any work required to address immediate health or life safety risks, or to prevent serious environmental harm, and relevant essential supply chain elements
  - Any entity with statutory responsibilities or that is involved in building and resource consenting necessary for the above purposes
- Courts, tribunals and the justice system
  - Courts of New Zealand, tribunals
  - Critical Crown entities such as the Electoral Commission
- Education
  - Any entity or individual determined by the Secretary for Education as required to provide distance or online learning (e.g. printers, devices, IT)
- Fast-moving community goods
  - Any entity involved in the supply, delivery, distribution and sale of food, beverage and other key consumer goods essential for maintaining the wellbeing of people
- Financial services
  - Any entity that operates consumer and business financial services, financial services infrastructure (including banking services), a stock exchange, broking services, payment and settlement systems, funds management (including KiwiSaver), insurance services, financial advice, and support services such as administrators, supervisors and custodians
- Health
  - District health boards (and all of their facilities), Pharmac, New Zealand Blood Service, Health Promotion Agency, Health Quality and Safety Commission
  - Any person employed or contracted as a doctor, nurse, midwife, pharmacist, paramedic, medical laboratory scientists, kaiāwhina workers, social workers, aged-care and community workers, and caregivers more generally
  - Hospitals, primary care clinics, pharmacies, medical laboratories, care facilities (e.g. rest homes)
  - Emergency dental and optometry care services
  - Any entity providing ambulance services
  - Any entity involved with the deceased/tūpāpaku (e.g. funeral homes, crematoria, cemeteries)
  - Any entity producing health sector equipment, medicines and personal protective equipment
- Local and national government
  - Any entity involved in COVID-19 response, enforcement, planning or logistics or that has civil-defence/emergency management functions (including any entity that supplies services for these purposes)
  - Key public services
- Foreign government
  - Maintaining critical operations at foreign missions based in New Zealand.
- Primary industries, including food and beverage production and processing
  - Any entity involved in the packaging, production and processing of food and beverage products, whether for domestic consumption or export
  - Any entity involved in relevant support services, such as food safety and verification, inspection or associated laboratory services, food safety and biosecurity functions
  - Any entity providing veterinary services
  - Any entity whose closure would jeopardise the maintenance of animal health or welfare standards (including the short-term survival of a species)
- Public safety and national security
  - Department of Corrections, Fire and Emergency New Zealand, Ministry of Defence, Ministry of Justice, New Zealand Defence Force, New Zealand Police, New Zealand Security Intelligence Service (NZSIS), Government Communications Security Bureau (GCSB)
  - Any person employed or contracted in a public safety or national security role
- Science
  - ESR, GNS Science, GeoNet, NIWA, MetService
  - Any entity (including research organisations) involved in COVID-19 response
  - Any entity (including research organisations) involved in hazard monitoring and resilience
  - Any entity (including research organisations) involved in diagnostics for essential services like biosecurity, public health
  - Laboratories and Physical Containment Level 3 (PC3) facilities that could provide essential services and products that could be used to respond to COVID-19
  - Other significant research facilities including animal facilities, clinical trials and infrastructure that require constant attention (e.g. samples, collections and storage facilities) that are important to New Zealand
- Social services
  - Those entities, including non-government organisations, that provide welfare and social services to meet immediate needs, to be specified jointly by the Ministry of Social Development (MSD) and Oranga Tamariki
- Transport and logistics
  - Ministry of Transport, New Zealand Customs Service, NZ Transport Agency, Civil Aviation Authority (including the Aviation Security Service), Maritime New Zealand (including the Rescue Coordination Centre), Air New Zealand, MetService, KiwiRail (including Interislander), and any entity that is contracted by these entities
  - Any entity that provides, or is contracted to an entity that provides, logistics services, including New Zealand Post and courier services
  - Any entity providing, or is contracted by an entity that provides, transport services to the Ministry of Health, a District Health Board, a Medical Officer of Health, or a Controller (as defined in section 4 of the Civil Defence and Emergency Management Act 2002)
  - Any entity that provides services related to the maintenance and ongoing operation of critical infrastructure (e.g. roads, rail, ports, airports)
  - Any entity that operates or is contracted by a lifeline utility, an aerodrome, a passenger and/or freight aviation service, a passenger and/or freight shipping service, a road freight service, a rail freight service, a vehicle recovery service; or a public transport service (under contract with a Regional Council)
  - Any small passenger-service vehicle driver (who holds the relevant licence) such as ride-share or taxi drivers
  - Any entity providing services to keep vehicles operational for essential work purposes (e.g. vehicle testing, mechanics, tyre services)
- Utilities and communications, including supply chains
  - Any entity involved in the production, supply, sale distribution or disposal of electricity, gas, water, waste water (e.g. sanitation), waste (e.g. rubbish collection and recycling), liquid and solid fuel, telecommunication services, and any entity that is contracted by these entities
  - The delivery of solid fuels (including firewood, pellets and coal) for immediate needs (e.g. home heating) or fulfilling existing orders, is an essential service.
  - News (including news production) and broadcast media
  - Internet service providers
  - Any entity that provides maintenance and repair services for utilities and communications, including supply chains
  - Any entity supplying services to an essential workplace that are required for the safe operation of that workplace (e.g. cleaning, security services)
  - Commercial cleaners that clean common areas of apartment buildings may continue to operate where there is high traffic (e.g. lifts, stairwells)
- Additional decisions and exemptions
  - All supermarkets and dairies are considered an essential service. A supermarket's primary focus is selling food products, and is a retail store operating on a self-service basis, selling groceries, fresh produce, meat, bakery and dairy products, and sometimes an assortment of non-food goods. Dairies must operate a "one-in-one-out" rule, and cannot sell cooked food.
  - Essential consumer products other than food (e.g. blankets, heaters, kitchenware and appliances, whiteware, computer equipment and mobile phones) may be sold subject to conditions. If a business cannot meet these conditions, it must not offer goods for sale.
  - Food delivery other than cooked prepared meals such as takeaways is allowed (e.g. supermarket home delivery, food parcels from charitable organisations, subscription food boxes, or any other whole-food delivery service). Meals-on-Wheels may continue to deliver prepared food. Ordering, payment and delivery must be contactless and the business must operate safely within the general health guidelines such as physical separation and hygiene.
  - Locksmiths can undertake essential work on emergency call-outs and essential activity to maintain the security of premises/personal properties.
  - Turf maintenance is not considered an essential service and should not be undertaken at this time.
  - Pet care services are not considered to be essential, except where necessary to maintain existing boarding of animals in pet care, or for long-term care when no other alternatives are available.
  - Vehicle washing services must only be undertaken when supporting essential services to ensure they are complying with the necessary health and safety requirements (e.g. washing off contaminated or biohazard materials).
  - Road safety equipment for road construction should only be used only where maintenance is essential.
  - Farmers markets are not considered to be an essential service, as alternatives are available
  - Liquor stores must close to the public unless they are within monopoly Licensing Trust areas (i.e. West Auckland, Gore and Invercargill), in which case they can operate with a one-in-one-out rule.
  - Pest management may be undertaken only where required for human health and safety, and it is essential. However, operators must ensure people have somewhere safe to go while the process is underway, in particular where a property is being vacated
  - Campgrounds and backpacker accommodation providers may continue to operate under very strict protocols and management of access. (e.g. contact to be maintained only with people staying in the same abode/room; common social and recreation areas to be closed; split shift access to common areas)
  - Butchers, bakeries and similar small-scale food retailers are considered non-essential, as similar products are readily available in supermarkets.
  - Natural health services are considered non-essential.
  - Security is considered an essential service, even if security services are being provided in relation to a premise for a non-essential service.
  - Self-storage facilities can operate only to facilitate access for essentials. New sales or expiries of units are considered non-essential. Access to existing lockers is permitted for essential items or services only, e.g. fridges
  - Critical support services to ensure businesses and workers can continue working from home are considered to be essential. This includes functions such as IT and Payroll.
  - Every restaurant, café and bar must close all aspects of their operation.
  - Self-service laundries can stay open, with 2-metre physical distancing to be enforced.
  - Bunnings, PlaceMakers, Mitre 10 and other retailers essential to the supply chain for building and construction can stay open to trade customers for essential purposes only.
  - The Tiwai Point Aluminium Smelter is exempt from closure, due to the long and complicated process of closing and restarting the potlines.
  - New Zealand Steel is to shut down in a way that allows for production to recommence easily.
  - Pulp and paper plants (e.g. Tasman, Kinleith) are to shut down their non-essential elements in a way that allows for production to recommence easily, and while maintaining essential production.
  - Methanex can remain in production, but at a scale consistent with the stability of gas supply.
