= Electoral history of Mike Moore =

List of elections featuring Mike Moore as a candidate

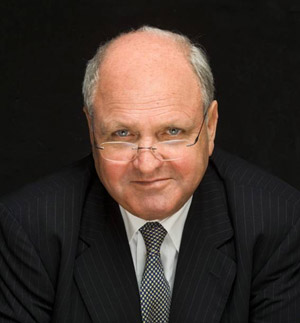
Mike Moore in 2004.

This is a summary of the electoral history of Mike Moore, Prime Minister of New Zealand (1990), Leader of the Labour Party (1990–93). He was a Member of Parliament for four electorates during his career: Eden, Papanui, Christchurch North, and Waimakariri.

== Parliamentary elections ==
=== 1972 election ===
General election, 1972: Eden
| Party | Candidate | Votes | % | ±% |
|---|---|---|---|---|
| Labour | Mike Moore | 9,046 | 48.19 | |
| National | Mary Kidd | 8,258 | 43.99 | |
| Values | Bert Keiller | 656 | 3.49 | |
| Social Credit | Neil Morrison | 646 | 3.44 | |
| New Democratic | C W Bott | 60 | 0.31 | |
| Independent | F W Bell | 48 | 0.25 | |
| National Socialist | Colin King-Ansell | 35 | 0.18 | |
| Liberal Reform | G T Tudor | 21 | 0.11 | |
| Majority | | 788 | 4.19 | |
| Turnout | | 18,770 | 88.55 | +1.21 |
| Registered electors | | 21,196 | | |

=== 1975 election ===
General election, 1975: Eden
| Party | Candidate | Votes | % | ±% |
|---|---|---|---|---|
| National | Aussie Malcolm | 9,725 | 49.48 | |
| Labour | Mike Moore | 8,394 | 42.71 | −5.48 |
| Values | Paul Lunberg | 991 | 5.04 | |
| Social Credit | Leslie Clark | 497 | 2.52 | |
| National Socialist | Colin King-Ansell | 19 | 0.09 | −0.09 |
| Independent Labour | Marilyn Voss | 16 | 0.08 | |
| Democratic Labour | Norma Hughes | 11 | 0.05 | |
| Majority | | 1,331 | 6.77 | |
| Turnout | | 19,653 | 73.90 | −14.65 |
| Registered electors | | 26,591 | | |

=== 1978 election ===
1978 general election: Papanui
| Party | Candidate | Votes | % | ±% |
|---|---|---|---|---|
| Labour | Mike Moore | 10,737 | 52.92 | |
| National | Bert Walker | 7,448 | 36.71 | −15.81 |
| Social Credit | Gary Clover | 1,359 | 6.69 | |
| Values | Tony Kunowski | 735 | 3.62 | −4.02 |
| Tory | John Collins | 8 | 0.03 | |
| Majority | | 3,289 | 16.21 | |
| Turnout | | 20,287 | 75.74 | −7.84 |
| Registered electors | | 26,784 | | |

=== 1981 election ===
General election, 1981: Papanui
| Party | Candidate | Votes | % | ±% |
|---|---|---|---|---|
| Labour | Mike Moore | 11,524 | 55.36 | +2.44 |
| National | Brian Keely | 7,115 | 34.18 | |
| Social Credit | Thomas Langridge | 2,174 | 10.44 | |
| Majority | | 4,409 | 21.18 | +4.97 |
| Turnout | | 20,813 | 91.30 | +15.56 |
| Registered electors | | 22,795 | | |

=== 1984 election ===
General election, 1984: Christchurch North
| Party | Candidate | Votes | % | ±% |
|---|---|---|---|---|
| Labour | Mike Moore | 12,350 | 56.55 | |
| National | David Dumergue | 6,662 | 30.50 | |
| NZ Party | Stephen Nicholson | 2,047 | 9.37 | |
| Social Credit | Thomas Langridge | 679 | 3.10 | |
| Values | Roger McArthur | 101 | 0.46 | |
| Majority | | 5,728 | 26.22 | |
| Turnout | | 21,839 | 93.27 | |
| Registered electors | | 23,413 | | |

=== 1987 election ===
General election, 1987: Christchurch North
| Party | Candidate | Votes | % | ±% |
|---|---|---|---|---|
| Labour | Mike Moore | 12,420 | 59.75 | +3.20 |
| National | Brendan McNeill | 7,722 | 37.15 | |
| Democrats | Mark Sadler | 499 | 2.40 | |
| Wizard Party | John Appleby | 145 | 0.69 | |
| Majority | | 4,698 | 22.60 | −3.62 |
| Turnout | | 20,786 | 88.37 | −4.90 |
| Registered electors | | 23,520 | | |

=== 1990 election ===
General election, 1990: Christchurch North
| Party | Candidate | Votes | % | ±% |
|---|---|---|---|---|
| Labour | Mike Moore | 11,050 | 50.79 | −8.96 |
| National | Peter Yarrell | 8,902 | 40.92 | |
| NewLabour | John Strange | 1,205 | 5.53 | |
| Christian Heritage | Bill Smith | 297 | 1.36 | |
| McGillicuddy Serious | Cecil G. Murgatroyd | 149 | 0.68 | |
| Democrats | Mark Sadler | 148 | 0.68 | −1.72 |
| Majority | | 2,148 | 9.87 | −12.73 |
| Turnout | | 21,753 | 87.83 | −0.54 |
| Registered electors | | 24,767 | | |

=== 1993 election ===
General election, 1993: Christchurch North
| Party | Candidate | Votes | % | ±% |
|---|---|---|---|---|
| Labour | Mike Moore | 11,605 | 53.76 | +2.97 |
| National | Lee Morgan | 5,581 | 25.85 | |
| Alliance | Jan Davey | 3,072 | 14.23 | |
| NZ First | Chris Fulford | 726 | 3.36 | |
| Christian Heritage | Alex Mann | 444 | 2.05 | |
| McGillicuddy Serious | Cecil G. Murgatroyd | 108 | 0.50 | −0.18 |
| Natural Law | Charles Drace | 47 | 0.21 | |
| Majority | | 6,024 | 27.91 | +18.04 |
| Turnout | | 21,583 | 86.17 | −1.66 |
| Registered electors | | 25,045 | | |

=== 1996 election ===
General election, 1996: Waimakariri
| Party | Candidate | Votes | % | ±% |
|---|---|---|---|---|
| Labour | Mike Moore | 19,875 | 56.57 | |
| National | Jim Gerard | 9,269 | 26.38 | |
| Alliance | John Wright | 2,370 | 6.74 | |
| NZ First | Claire Bulman | 1,888 | 5.37 | |
| Christian Coalition | Lindsay Bain | 1,014 | 2.88 | |
| ACT | Ross Andrews | 401 | 1.14 | |
| Natural Law | Mike Barthelmeh | 86 | 0.24 | |
| Independent | Peter Hawkhead | 58 | 0.16 | |
| Informal votes | | 170 | 0.48 | |
| Majority | | 10,606 | 30.18 | |
| Turnout | | 35,131 | 88.67 | |
| Registered electors | | 39,619 | | |

== Leadership elections ==
=== 1983 Deputy-leadership election ===
First ballot

| Candidate | Votes | % |
|---|---|---|
| Mike Moore | 19 | 44.18 |
| Geoffrey Palmer | 15 | 34.88 |
| Ann Hercus | 9 | 20.93 |
| Majority | 4 | 9.30 |
| Turnout | 43 | —N/a |

Second ballot

| Candidate | Votes | % |
|---|---|---|
| Geoffrey Palmer | 22 | 51.17 |
| Mike Moore | 21 | 48.83 |
| Majority | 1 | 2.32 |
| Turnout | 43 | —N/a |

=== 1989 Leadership election ===
| Candidate | Votes | % |
|---|---|---|
| Geoffrey Palmer | 41 | 75.92 |
| Mike Moore | 13 | 24.08 |
| Majority | 28 | 51.85 |
| Turnout | 54 | —N/a |

=== 1990 Leadership election ===
| Candidate | Votes | % |
|---|---|---|
| Mike Moore | 41 | 73.21 |
| Richard Northey | 15 | 26.79 |
| Majority | 26 | 46.42 |
| Turnout | 56 | —N/a |

=== 1993 Leadership election ===
| Candidate | Votes | % |
|---|---|---|
| Helen Clark | 26 | 57.77 |
| Mike Moore | 19 | 42.23 |
| Majority | 7 | 15.55 |
| Turnout | 45 | —N/a |

== Party elections ==
=== 1976 Party Conference ===
1976 Junior Presidential election
| Candidate | Votes | % |
| Mike Moore | 793 | 77.29% |
| Margaret Shields | 161 | 15.69% |
| Michael Hirschfeld | 40 | 3.89% |
| Ted Thompson | 32 | 3.11% |

=== 1977 Party Conference ===
1977 Junior Presidential election
| Candidate | Votes | % |
| Mike Moore | 689 | 70.66% |
| Margaret Shields | 286 | 29.34% |
