= Action Zealandia =

New Zealand white nationalist group

- Leader: James "Hector" Fairburn (2019–2021)
- Dates active: 2019–2023
- Active regions: New Zealand
- Ideology: White nationalism White supremacy Anti-Māori sentiment Antisemitism; New Zealand nationalism Masculinism; Environmentalism; Anti-capitalism; Anti-immigration; Anti-LGBT; Islamophobia; Identitarianism
- Political position: Far-right
- Status: Active
- Size: 30 members (2021)
- Website: https://action-zealandia.com/

Action Zealandia is a white nationalist group in New Zealand that emerged following the Christchurch mosque shootings in 2019 as the successor to an earlier group called the Dominion Movement. According to Newshub, Action Zealandia has restricted its membership to "physically fit, tidy European male[s] of sound mind and good character." In addition to its online activities, the group has plastered stickers, posted banners, and networked with other far-right and neo-Nazi groups in New Zealand and abroad. Action Zealandia has also attracted media attention after members made an online threat against Christchurch's Al Noor Mosque, attempted to start a terror cell, purchase weapons, and participated in the 2022 Wellington protest.

== Ideology and goals ==
According to the group's website, Action Zealandia's stated goal is to build a community for European New Zealanders. They claim that European identity is under threat from so-called "demographic replacement" caused by economically-motivated migration by non-European peoples. Action Zealandia also emphasises masculinity, physical fitness, and condemns drug use and so-called "sexual deviancy." In addition, Action Zealandia promotes nationalism, environmental sustainability and opposes free market capitalism and mass migration as detrimental to national identity and environmental sustainability.

According to the University of Waikato law academic Al Gillespie and Newsroom journalist Marc Daalder, Action Zealandia's ideology blends far-right nationalism with left-wing environmentalism, they are often involved in picking up rubbish and bushwalks. Action Zealandia is a fraternity also excludes women from becoming members but allows them as supporters; the disabled, drug addicts and obese individuals are also excluded from membership. Action Zealandia also opposes libertarianism on the grounds that free market capitalism contributes to the "demographic replacement" of European New Zealanders.

University of Auckland political scientist Chris Wilson and Stuff journalist James Halpin have classified Action Zealandia as a paramilitary group that sees itself as sowing the seeds for a mass nationalist movement seeking to normalise White nationalist talking points around European heritage, White identity, immigration and multiculturalism. While the group has not engaged in terrorist violence, members of Action Zealandia have promoted what the authors consider "hateful rhetoric" targeting minorities, women and leftists; which Wilson and Halpin argue could encourage acts of violence by individual actors.

== Leadership and membership ==
According to the University of Otago student magazine Critic Te Ārohi journalist Elliott Weir, Action Zealandia had about 30 active members as of August 2021 with at least eight supporters including three women. Although the majority of members are aged between 18 and 35 years, teenagers as young as 13 years of age have attempted to join the group.

As of August 2021, their leader is New Zealand Army reservist and former Army communications specialist James Fairburn, who is known by the codename "Hector." In June 2020, Daalder reported that Fairburn had attempted to use his reservist status to secure an "E" endorsement for his firearms license that would allow him to purchase semi-automatic firearms. Fairburn has participated in far-right Discord channels, promoted the White genocide conspiracy theory, advocated for White South African farmers, and opposed the United Nations' Global Compact for Migration. Fairburn said in January 2023 that he had not been involved with Action Zealandia since September 2021.

== History and activities ==
=== Dominion Movement ===
According to the journalist Marc Daalder, Action Zealandia emerged in July 2019 as the successor to the Dominion Movement, a far-right group that ceased its activities following the Christchurch mosque shootings in March 2019. The Dominion Movement was a self-described "grass-roots Identitarian activist organisation committed to the revitalisation of our country and our people: White New Zealanders". The group condemned the Christchurch mosque shootings and claimed that it advocated non-violence. Due to the backlash against far-right groups as a result of the shootings, the Dominion Movement ceased operations and shut down its website. In addition, the Dominion Movement opposed consumerism, immigration, and the existence of transgender people.

According to a Stuff report, an alleged co-founder of the Dominion Movement was a New Zealand Defence Force soldier named Johann Wolfe, who was facing court martial in January 2020 for conducting four counts of espionage and two counts of attempted espionage with an undisclosed group. He was also the first New Zealander to have been charged with espionage. According to The New Zealand Herald, Wolfe was a founding leader of Action Zealandia and had expressed support for Brenton Tarrant, the Christchurch mosque shooter. While Action Zealandia has denied any connection to the Dominion Movement, Daalder uncovered a set of leaked documents which confirmed that members of Dominion Movement had intentionally established Action Zealandia. These documents instructed members to conceal their connections to the former Dominion Movement and encouraged former Dominion members to lie to other Action Zealandia members about their prior affiliation. As a security precaution, these guidelines also advised former Dominion members to destroy or conceal their branded flags and other memorabilia associated with the Dominion Movement.

=== Communications output ===
Action Zealandia maintains a website, which was registered through the Instra Corporation on 23 May 2019. The group also runs a podcast called Voice of Zealandia, which has an associated Facebook page. After Action Zealandia was banned from Twitter and YouTube in June 2021, the group has turned to other social media platforms such as Discord, Gab, Odyssee, Telegram and Element. In October 2021, Stuff reported that Meta Platforms had banned Action Zealandia from Facebook, citing a leaked Facebook list of "Dangerous Individuals and Organisations" obtained by the American media organisation The Intercept.

In addition to their online activities, Action Zealandia has also plastered stickers in public spaces promoting their nationalist ideology. in June 2022, Action Zealandia members unsuccessfully attempted to plaster "White Lives Matter" and "Kyle Rittenhouse Was Right" posters in Dunedin but fled after being confronted by members of the public. In August 2022, the group's leaders ordered its chapters to do banner drops and poster runs in order to promote "White Lives Matter Day" on 9 August. The group wanted to use White Lives Matter Day to raise awareness of alleged White genocide in the South African farm attacks.

=== Potential and proven crimes ===
According to Daalder, Action Zealandia was also linked to at least three potential crimes in March 2020 including a member named Sam Brittenden making an online threat against the Al Noor Mosque in Christchurch, posting a leaked New Zealand Police Financial Intelligence unit document, and alleged plans to start a terror cell and purchase weapons from like-minded groups such as the Atomwaffen Division.

In 2020, Action Zealandia vandalised Nick Smith's electorate office with graffiti and posters.

On 18 August 2025, a New Zealand Defence Force soldier, who had admitted being a member of the Dominion Movement and Action Zealandia, pleaded guilty at a court martial to attempted espionage on behalf of a foreign power; the first successful conviction for such a crime in New Zealand. The defendant admitted providing classified information including the telephone directories of several army camps and access codes to Linton Military Camp and the nearby RNZAF Base Ohakea to an undercover New Zealand agent, posing as a foreign spy. In his affidavit, the soldier described the Dominion Movement and Action Zealandia as a "positive experience" for him and claimed they were not terrorist groups. On 20 August, the soldier was sentenced to two years' imprisonment for attempted espionage.

=== Entryism and networking ===
In August 2021, the Critic Te Ārohi journalist Elliot Weir reported an undercover investigation of Action Zealandia, including their plans to infiltrate the National and New Zealand Social Credit parties and planning to appeal to a broader group of people. Action Zealandia has also cultivated relationships with both domestic and overseas white supremacist and neo-Nazi groups and figures including former New Zealand National Front general secretary Kerry Bolton, Thomas Sewell's National Socialist Network, International Conservative Community, Nordic Resistance Movement, New British Union, Blair Cottrell, and Robert Rundo's Rise Above Movement. The International Conservative Community is a transnational network of fascist groups founded by Rundo. Action Zealandia is the New Zealand chapter of the group.

=== COVID-19 pandemic ===
During the COVID-19 pandemic in New Zealand, Action Zealandia spread misinformation and conspiracy theories about COVID-19 vaccines, claiming that they were part of a Jewish conspiracy to sterilise and depopulate the world. Members pressured other members not to get vaccinated and discussed ways of circumventing workplace vaccine mandates including falsifying vaccine documents. Action Zealandia also supported 2022 Wellington protest. In mid February 2022, an Action Zealandia member, posted a video and photos of the protest from Bowen House. These activities sparked an investigation by law enforcement authorities and prompted Speaker of the House Trevor Mallard to restrict access to Bowen House.

=== Jordan Milburn ===
In 2022, Jordan Milburn ran for 2022 Upper Hutt City Council election, saying he grew up there and "would like to raise his young family here." Milburn ran on positions such as "ensuring our city grows sustainable without ruining the beautiful scenery that surrounds our city", and argued he could "bring new energy, a new voice, new charisma, something to it, to revitalise the city to ensure it stays a great place to live."

Anti-racism group Paparoa accused Milburn of having links to Action Zealandia and espousing “pro-white” views, he subseqently resigned from his job as a software engineer at Civil Aviation Authority of New Zealand. He also worked for Department of Corrections.

Milburn was accused of running a white supremacist podcast Voice of Zealandia under the alias 'Zane', where he said "I think that we have to accept that we have to play that game, that if you’re pro-white then you’re part of our in-group and if you’re not pro-white, you’re not. We have to say: If you’re one of us, we will act with extreme cohesion and we will try and build strong group solidarity together – using each other’s businesses through economic communities, controlling social services and moving to take control within local councils and local regions." On other episodes, Milburn interviewed English white nationalist Mark Collett and the leader of the far-right Australia First Party, Jim Saleam.

The alias 'Zane' sent a 28-page Word document to Action Zealandia members with anti-semitic slurs and comments, including calling Massey University Professor Paul Spoonley a “Jewish puppet ... he produces academic work on behalf of Jews when he is paid” The document was obtained by Elliot Weir, editor at Otago University’s student magazine Critic Te Ārohi, who was undercover in Action Zealandia.

Upper Hutt mayor Wayne Guppy said he was disappointed a candidate alleged to have extremist views was standing in Upper Hutt, "Their views have no place in Upper Hutt and no place in New Zealand society." Green Party Member of Parliament Julie Anne Genter, who was formerly Minister of Civil Aviation, said the revelations called for urgently review of the Civil Aviation Authority of New Zealand's hiring processes, "We are particularly concerned in light of the observations by the Royal commission inquiry into the Christchurch mosque attack about the risk posed by far-right extremism." Department of Corrections confirmed Milburn worked at an office-based role for roughly a year but that he didn't work on the frontline, and said "We have robust recruitment and selection processes, which include a range of checks prior to employment. Links to extremist organisations or certain criminal convictions would deem a person unsuitable for this work."

He received the second lowest number of votes in the 2022 Upper Hutt City Council election, with 1,585 votes. In 2025, Civil Aviation Authority of New Zealand admited failure in hiring Jordan Milburn and James Fairburn.
