= Unit 88 =

New Zealand neo-Nazi organisation

Unit 88 was a neo-Nazi organisation founded in Wellington by Collin Wilson and later based in Auckland, New Zealand. They were most active from 1997-1998 and are now defunct.

Named after the use of 88 as a reading of 'HH' or Heil Hitler as commonly employed by neo-Nazi groups, they also employed the name of racist skinhead movement Blood & Honour as their motto. They also sought to expand in Wellington, distributing propaganda in the city. Seen as one of the more violent groups in New Zealand, Unit 88 have argued that they only used violence in self-defence.

The movement was investigated by the Race Relations Office for distributing pro-Nazi literature in 1997. The investigation was supported by Minister of Justice Doug Graham, who intimated this in response to a question by New Zealand National Party MP Pansy Wong . At the time it had been claimed that Unit 88 was in the process of seeking to expand its membership throughout the country. Largely a racist skinhead movement, which claims to have around 100 members, links have been alleged between Unit 88 and Colin King-Ansell.

Unit 88 hosted a large National Meeting for White Nationalist from around New Zealand in their Auckland base. This was leaked to the media and caused some trouble with local gangs and police. Unit 88 disbanded and selected members joined with the New Zealand Hammerskins who were also expanding at that time. Mr Bar set up a group called 88 Hammers as part of the process to fully join the Hammerskin Nation. The Dominion and the Press news papers reported the link as police raids and street conflict was drawing police attention in both Wellington and Christchurch.

Some attempts have been made to re-establish Unit 88, but it has stayed defunct. Other skinheads who were part of the early formations of Unit 88 formed other groups like Frontline Skinheads in South Auckland and some joined with the other emerging Auckland group the Psycho Skins (also now defunct).

== See also ==
- Fascism in New Zealand
