= Kerry Bolton =

New Zealand far-right political activist

- Born: Kerry Raymond Bolton; 1956 (age 69–70)
- Citizenship: New Zealand
- Occupation: Activist
- Organization: Black Order
- Known for: White supremacy

Kerry Raymond Bolton (born 1956) is a New Zealand white supremacist writer, occultist, and political activist. In 1980, Bolton co-founded the Church of Odin as the New Zealand branch of the Australian neopagan organisation, First Anglecyn Church of Odin. In the 1990s, he established several far-right occult organizations, including the Order of the Left Hand Path and the Black Order. He is involved in several nationalist and fascist political groups in New Zealand.

== Early life ==
Kerry Raymond Bolton was born in 1956.

== Career ==
=== 1980s–1990s ===
Bolton was a co-founder of the Nationalist Workers' Party, a far-right and white supremacist organization in New Zealand. In 1980, Bolton and David Crawford founded the Church of Odin, the New Zealand branch of the First Anglecyn Church of Odin, a pro-Nazi neopagan organisation for whites "of non-Jewish descent". Though officially a branch of the First Anglecyn Church founded by Alexander Rud Mills in Melbourne in 1936, the Church of Odin also considered Else Christensen's Mills-inspired Odinist Fellowship as a parent organisation. By 1983 Bolton had left the Church. The church creed, two newsletters, and other materials are archived at the Alexander Turnbull Library.

In the late 1980s, Bolton, frustrated by the seeming futility of his politics electorally, began to look for other paths. He became interested in Satanism, particularly the Satanic Nazism espoused by the British Order of Nine Angles. He founded the neo-Nazi Satanist Order of the Left Hand Path (OLHP) in 1992, following a quarrel with members of the Temple of Set. He operated the group under the pseudonym Faustus Scorpius. Two years later it was renamed the Ordo Sinistra Vivendi ("Order of the Left Way"). They published a newsletter, The Watcher, which was replaced by another magazine called The Heretic in 1992.

In 1994, Bolton established another Satanic neo-Nazi group, the fascist Black Order. It claimed to have a network of national lodges in six European countries plus Australia and the U.S. It was intended to be an activist front promoting an "occult-fascist axis" by mobilising political groups and youth culture elements such as industrial music. Bolton created and edited the Black Order newsletter, The Flaming Sword, and its successor, The Nexus, a satanic-Nazi journal with special attention given to figures such as Savitri Devi, Julius Evola, and Ezra Pound, and which especially catered to the black metal movement. It later changed its name to Western Destiny. He has also written articles which have been published in The Black Flame, a magazine run by the Church of Satan.

In 1996, Bolton formed The Thelemic Society which blended rightist politics with the teachings of the English occultist Aleister Crowley and the philosophy of the German thinker Friedrich Nietzsche.

Bolton was briefly secretary for the New Zealand Fascist Union in 1997, in which he promoted the 'patriotic socialism' of 1930s Labour hero John A. Lee.

=== 2000s ===
In 2004, Bolton was the secretary of the New Zealand National Front and spokesman for the New Right group.

In 2008, a masters thesis written about Bolton published by the Waikato University was temporarily withdrawn from the library pending investigation after Bolton complained to the vice-chancellor and threatened to sue the university. The thesis, titled "Dreamers of the Dark: Kerry Bolton and the Order of the Left Hand Path; a Case-study of a Satanic/Neo Nazi Synthesis", authored by Roel van Leeuwen, dealt with the link between neo-Nazi and satanic beliefs in New Zealand. It had been passed by the university, had been reviewed by senior academics from two other universities, and had received full class honours. Dov Bing, who supervised the thesis, called it a first-class piece of work. Bolton claimed the thesis was "poorly researched" and was "a poorly contrived smear-document against a private individual, namely myself". After criticism from the Tertiary Education Union, Vice Chancellor Crawford issued a one-page letter stating that the thesis was sound because it had been externally examined by "two well qualified academics". Van Leeuwen was allowed to remove some aspects of the thesis after Bolton's criticisms. Bolton complained that the inquiry did not look into any of the inaccuracies he claimed were in the thesis.

In December 2009, Bolton filed a complaint with the Broadcasting Standards Authority concerning the Ideas programme on Radio New Zealand National, which featured Marxist poet and sociologist Scott Hamilton. Hamilton had stated that Bolton was an avid "holocaust denier", had a "close relationship" with the Holocaust denial group Adelaide Institute, insinuated himself into the anti-war movement where he made anti-Semitic and "holocaust denial" statements, and exercised a bad political influence over "unwary youth". Bolton claimed that all of Hamilton's allegations were incorrect. The Broadcasting Standards Authority initially upheld Bolton's complaint on all grounds, and criticised Radio New Zealand for not having verified the accuracy of Hamilton's statements before broadcasting the programme, but reversed this decision in December 2010 and declined to uphold any of Bolton's complaints.

In December 2009, Bolton complained to the Press Council against a lengthy feature article run by The Press, Christchurch, "A Right Muddle" by John McCrone. Bolton stated that the article wrongly stated that Bolton was a "neo-Nazi Satanist", that he was associated with "white power" and "pseudo-fascist views", that he was the founder of New Right New Zealand, among other matters. The Press Council in a ruling dated for release as 26 March 2010, upheld parts of the complaint, determining that the article is "inaccurate and biased".

=== 2020s ===
In 2021, the University of Otago student magazine Critic Te Ārohi reported that Bolton is in regular contact with the white supremacist organisation Action Zealandia.

== Other activities ==
In 2014, Bolton was involved in a campaign seeking (unsuccessfully) to save a young dog from euthanasia for allegedly nipping another dog on the hind leg in the course of play. The dog was euthanised two days early after threats on Facebook of violence against council staff members.

In 2019, he appeared in court for breaching the name suppression of a sexual assault victim in 2018 on a radio show. Bolton was discharged without conviction by Porirua District Court judge Ian Mill on the condition that he pay reparation of $1500 to the victim within a month. Police prosecutor Sergeant Paul Macky said it was inconceivable that he did not know about the suppression.

== Views ==
Bolton's ideology has been described by scholar Steven Leonard Jacobs as white nationalist and fascist. Scholar of religion Massimo Introvigne characterized him in 2016 as a "well-known right-wing extremist".

He has criticized Christianity, considering it a "slave religion". Bolton has praised the fascist writer Francis Parker Yockey, the author of the Spenglerian tome Imperium. In 2018 he authored a book about Yockey, titled Francis Parker Yockey: A Fascist Odyssey, published by Arktos Media.

== Published works ==
- Thinkers of the Right: Fascism, Nationalism & Elitism Amongst the Literati (Luton Publications, 2002)
- Revolution from Above (Arktos Media, 2011)
- Artists of the Right (Counter-Currents, 2012)
- The Parihaka Cult (Black House Publishing, 2012)
- Stalin: The Enduring Legacy (Black House Publishing, 2012)
- Geopolitics of the Indo-Pacific (Black House Publishing, 2013)
- The Psychotic Left: From Jacobin France to the Occupy Movement (Black House Publishing, 2013)
- The Banking Swindle (Black House Publishing, 2013)
- Babel Inc. (Black House Publishing, 2013)
- Perón and Perónism (Black House Publishing, 2014)
- Zionism, Islam and the West (Black House Publishing, 2015)
- Religion, Mysticism and the Myth of the "Occult Reich" (Inconvenient History, 2015)
- Opposing the Money Lenders: The Struggle to Abolish Interest Slavery (Black House Publishing, 2016)
- The Occult and Subversive Movements: Tradition & Counter-Tradition in the Struggle for World Power (Black House Publishing, 2017)
- The Decline and Fall of Civilisations (Black House Publishing, 2017)
- More Artists of the Right (Counter-Currents, 2017)
- Francis Parker Yockey: A Fascist Odyssey (Arktos Media Ltd, 2018)
- Russia and the Fight Against Globalisation (Black House Publishing, 2018)
- The Perversion of Normality: From the Marquis de Sade to Cyborgs (Arktos Media Ltd, 2021)
- The Tyranny of Human Rights: From Jacobinism to the United Nations (Antelope Hill Publishing, 2022)
- Generation '68: The Elite Revolution and Its Legacy (Antelope Hill Publishing, 2024)
- Rise of the Dollar Empire: America's Profitable Crusade Against the European Colonies (Antelope Hill Publishing, 2026)

== See also ==
- Far-right politics in New Zealand
- Augustus Sol Invictus – American far-right activist (born 1983)
