= Anti-Māori sentiment =

Anti-Māori sentiment, broadly defined, is the dislike, distrust, discrimination, and racism directed against Māori people as an ethnicity and Māori culture. Various scholars have characterised anti-Māori sentiment as stemming from the colonisation of New Zealand by Britain.

Assimilationist policies pursued by successive early New Zealand governments were all marked by anti-Māori sentiment, often justified through false claims Māori were "dying out". Anti-Māori sentiment developed as views of Māori among Pākehā evolved, from the earliest notions of "noble savages" to 20th-century stereotypes of Māori as being fat, lazy, dirty, happy-go-lucky and unintelligent, or as criminals. Although racial segregation was never legally sanctioned in New Zealand, some towns practised it anyway until the 1960s. Anti-Māori bias in the media is well-documented and extensive. In 2020, media giant Stuff, which owns the Dominion Post and The Press, formally apologised for anti-Māori coverage in its newspapers dating back 160 years.

== History ==
Anti-Māori sentiment originated with the arrival of Europeans. As New Zealand transitioned from a collection of self-governing Māori polities to a British colonial possession and then self-governing country, anti-Māori attitudes were soon present in both administration and among Pākehā (European New Zealanders). Although Māori are well regarded in popular culture as having been treated better than other indigenous people, anti-Māori sentiment has been a constant fixture of New Zealand society since colonisation.

=== Denigration of Māori law and customs ===
Some 19th century legislation acknowledged traditional Māori practice and custom. One of the Māori laws that the Crown undermined was the principle of collective ownership of land. The first efforts to circumvent Māori law regarding ownership was the pre-emption clause in Article Two of the Treaty of Waitangi. This gave the Crown the right of first refusal, to prevent the sale of Māori land to anyone other than the Crown. This was justified by British officials as necessary to protect Maori interests in land dealings with settlers and other colonial powers, such as France. Pre-emption allowed the acquisition of tribal land by the Crown, the undermining Māori culture and law and helped achieve substantive British sovereignty. This was especially so in the "golden age of Māori enterprise", the period in which Māori outnumbered the first Pākehā, controlled the economy, and were generally in a position of strength.

Māori were also discriminated against in suffrage. Although the Māori version of the Treaty of Waitangi gave the Crown the right to govern British subjects, Māori who wanted to partake in the earliest New Zealand democracy were largely shunned due to the land-ownership franchise, which restricted the right to vote to men aged 21 and over who owned property worth least 25 pounds. Since most Māori land was communally owned, very few Māori had the right to vote. This changed in 1867, when the Māori seats were established, but there were only four, when Māori would have been entitled by population quota to between 14 and 16. Māori were prevented from switching between the Māori and General electoral rolls until 1975, meaning they were under-represented for more than a century.

The Native Lands Act 1865, the successor to an 1852 act, established the Native Land Court, whose primary purpose was to aggressively expand land purchases for British and Irish settlers in the North Island through individualising Māori land title in English law. This method of outlawing collective ownership by refusing to acknowledge multiple property owners was justified by Minister of Justice (and first Prime Minister) Henry Sewell as essential for "the detribalisation of the Māori – to destroy, if it were possible, the principle of communism upon which their social system is based and which stands as a barrier in the way of all attempts to amalgamate the Māori race into our social and political system." This manifested through land confiscations (raupatu) during the concurrent New Zealand Wars. The Waitangi Tribunal's 1996 Taranaki report emphasised that the Taranaki raupatu "carried the germ for cultural genocide". In 1867, colonial politician Isaac Featherston said "the Maoris are dying out fast, nothing can save them; our plain duty as compassionate colonists is to smooth the dying pillow of the Maori; then history will have nothing to reproach us with."

The Native Schools Act 1867 soon followed, to strongly discourage the speaking of the Māori language in New Zealand schools. Although children were to be encouraged to speak English, there was no official policy banning children from speaking Māori. However some native school committees made rules banning this, and Māori children were sometimes physically punished for speaking their native tongue at school. This practice, which persisted for decades after the act was introduced in 1867, contributed to the Māori language's steep decline, and further alienation of Māori from Māori culture.

=== Evolving views of Māori ===
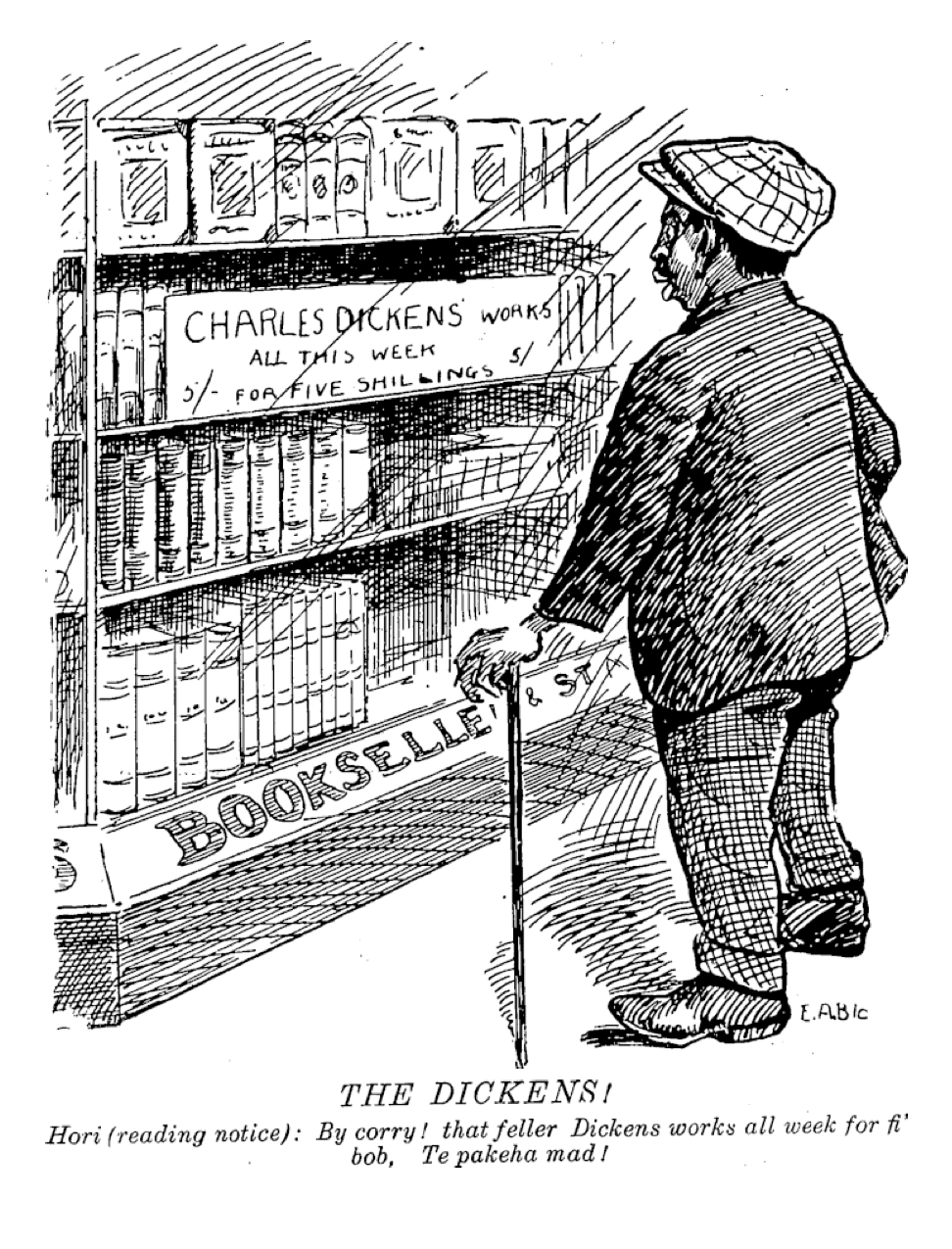
'Hori reading notice' (Observer, 4 July 1914). Note the character's use of pidgin English

Māori were subject to a patronising line of analysis by Pākehā ethnographers, who viewed them as "noble savages", who were "dying out". This was a flawed and sometimes welcomed interpretation of Māori population decline, caused by the introduction of European diseases to which they had no immunity, as well as the Musket Wars and New Zealand Wars. In 1898, New Zealand politician William Pember Reeves wrote that "the average colonist regards a Mongolian with revulsion, a Negro with contempt, and looks on an Australian black as very near to a wild beast; but he likes the Maoris, and is sorry that they are dying out." As a result of the more mild view of Māori inferiority, racial intermarriage was accepted and widespread.

Although belief in white supremacy was widespread, it was based less on an assumption of genetic superiority than one of British cultural superiority. It was believed that if Māori culture was suppressed and Māori people were forcibly assimilated, they would be equal to British settlers.

Māori were increasingly made into comical figures in the Pākehā imagination. Historian Peter Gibbons has described how "Māori themselves and their cultures were textualized by Pakeha, so that the colonists could 'know' the people they were displacing. It is not too much to say that the colonists produced (or invented) 'the Maori', making them picturesque, quaint, largely ahistorical, and, through printed materials, manageable." Racial slurs such as hori are an example, with the term originally referring to a stock character of an uneducated, lazy Māori man.

=== Open discrimination in society ===
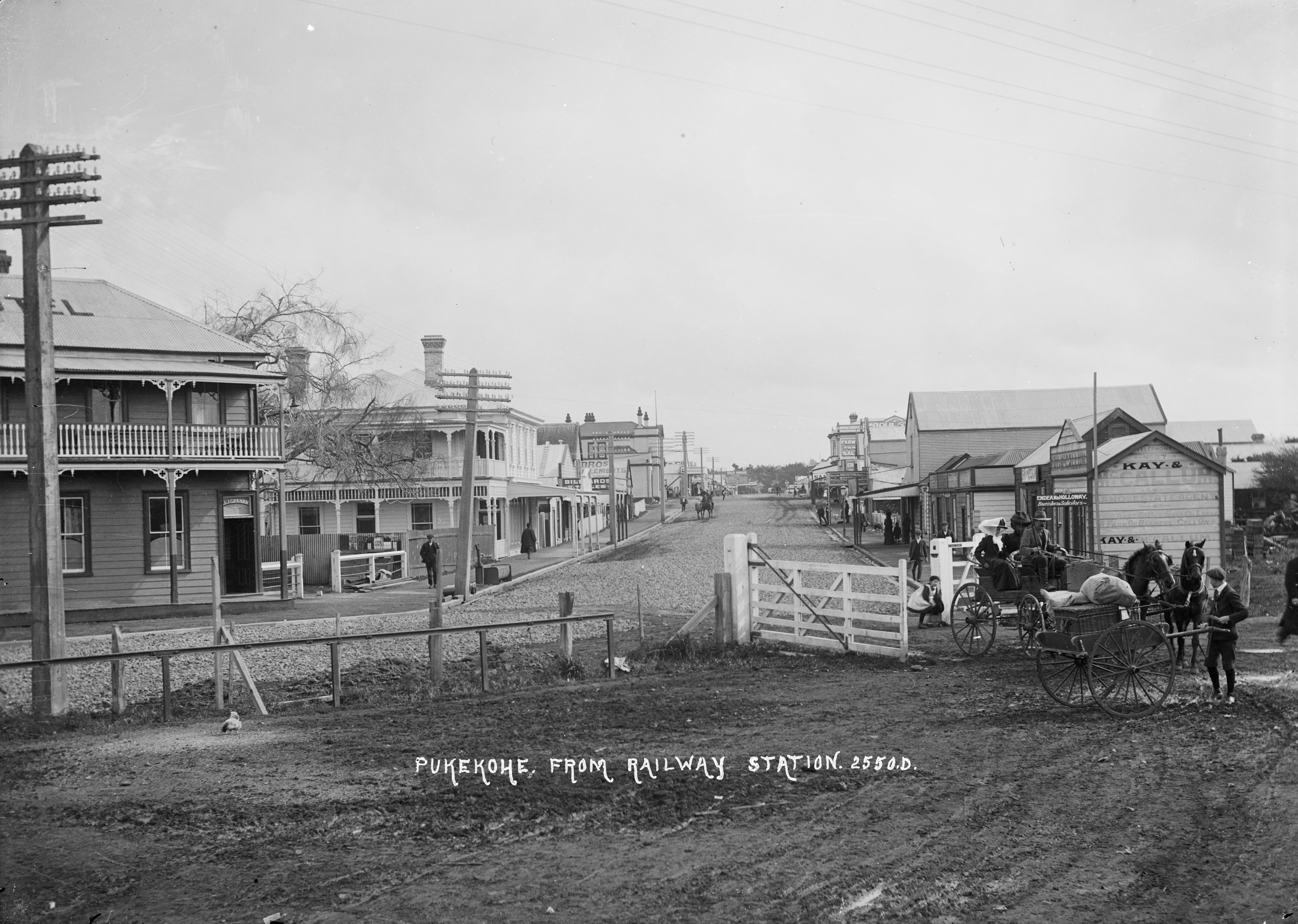
Pukekohe (modern day South Auckland), c. 1910. In the mid-century Pukekohe was one of the most notoriously segregated towns in the country.

Unlike in the United States or South Africa, New Zealand never enforced formal racial segregation. However, racial segregation did exist in some places in a formal or local level against Māori, to favour Pākehā and Asians. From 1925 to the early 1960s in Pukekohe, a small town now within South Auckland, Māori had designated sections of cinemas to sit in, refused service from taxi drivers, barbers, and most pub landlords, prevented from accessing swimming pools except on Fridays, forced to stand for Pākehā bus passengers, and were forced to live in slums where preventable diseases were rife. More than 200 Māori infants and children are recorded to have died from measles, diphtheria, whooping cough and tuberculosis, linked to slum living conditions, including 29 in 1938 alone. Pukekohe was also home to the country's sole racially segregated school, which operated from c. 1952 till its closure in 1964. Other cities enforced some minor segregation, such as segregated public toilets in Tauranga in the 1940s and libraries in Kaitaia.

The Battle of Manners Street in 1943 was one memorable event of Pākehā protest against anti-Māori segregation, in which New Zealand Army soldiers fought American Army soldiers who were allegedly attempting to prevent Māori servicemen from entering the Allied Services Club on Manners Street, Te Aro, Wellington.

== 21st century ==
In the 21st century, anti-Māori sentiment has become more prominent and widely alleged as Māori culture has become more revitalised in public life, and Māori issues of greater concern among non-Māori. As of the 2023 census, one in five New Zealanders are of Māori descent. The 2004 Foreshore and Seabed controversy led to a resurgence of the Māori protest movement, which in turn was used by the political right to challenge tino rangatiratanga, or Māori sovereignty, as illegitimate or racist in itself. Such movements include Hobson's Pledge, an anti-Treatyist lobby group founded by former National Party leader Don Brash to oppose Māori treaty settlements and affirmative action, as well as Tross Publishing, Whale Oil, and elements of the ACT New Zealand political party.

Brash's populist leadership of the National Party included his 2004 Orewa speech, in which he claimed Māori had accumlated "privilege" through Government reparative efforts.

=== Co-governance ===
One of the more prominent ways anti-Māori sentiment is expressed is through fears about co-governance between Māori iwi and the Crown in accordance with the Treaty of Waitangi. This follows the wider trend against the Waitangi Tribunal that accelerated during Don Brash's leadership of the National Party in 2005, and increased Māori political agency and biculturalism, including tropes of "Māori privilege". Other examples include a wider backlash towards Māori language revitalisation. A rise in anti-Māori sentiment, particularly against Māori women, was reported in the lead up to the 2023 New Zealand general election. The crossover between anti-Māori sentiment and opposition to co-governance has become harder to distinguish in recent years, as prominent Māori right-wing figures, such as Winston Peters and David Seymour, are some of the most prominent opponents. In March 2024, Peters controversially compared co-governance to Nazi Germany and Nazi racial theories. His remarks were described as offensive by Ben Kepes, a spokesperson for the Holocaust Centre of NZ, and Labour Party leader Chris Hipkins.

There are also marginal extremist groups, such as the defunct New Zealand National Front and active Action Zealandia, who are white nationalist in character and deny Māori are indigenous.

== See also ==
- Treaty Principles Bill
- Hobson's Pledge
- Far-right politics in New Zealand
