= 2022 Upper Hutt City Council election =

Local election in New Zealand

- 8 October 2022
- Mayoral election
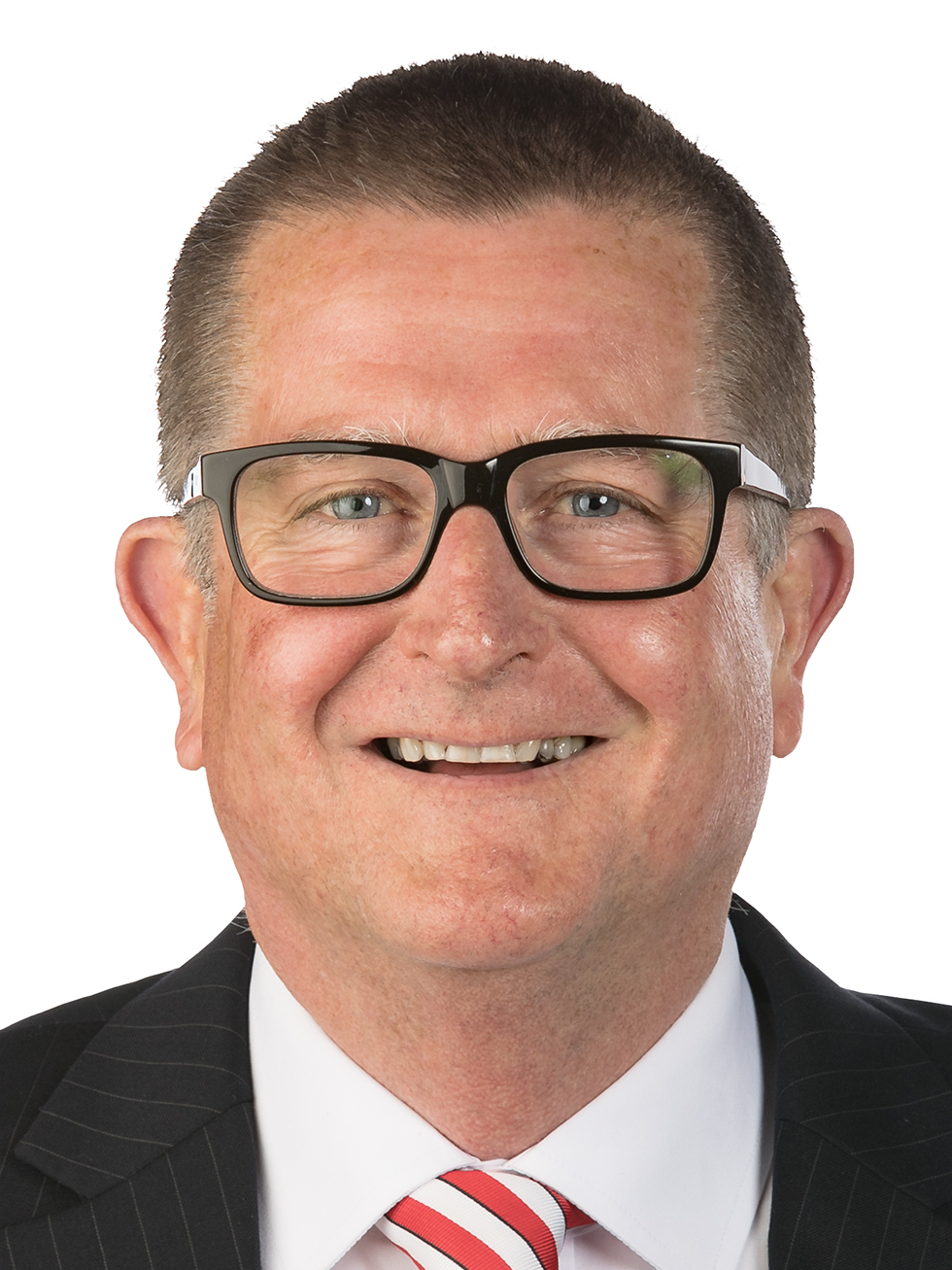

Candidate	Wayne Guppy	Angela McLeod
Affiliation	Independent	Independent
Popular vote	5,815	4,267
Percentage	44.94%	32.98%
Mayor before election
Wayne Guppy
Independent
Elected mayor
Wayne Guppy
Independent
- Council election
- 10 seats on the Upper Hutt City Council; 6 seats needed for a majority
Party	Seats	+/–
Independents	10	0
This lists parties that won seats. See the complete results below.

The 2022 Upper Hutt City Council election was a local election held from 16 September until 8 October in Upper Hutt, New Zealand as part of that year's nation-wide local elections. Voters elected the mayor of Upper Hutt and 10 city councillors for the 2022–2025 term of the Upper Hutt City Council. Postal voting and the first-past-the-post voting system were used.

== Campaign ==
=== Jordan Milburn ===
After anti-racism group Paparoa accused candidate Jordan Milburn of having links to neo-nazi group Action Zealandia and espousing “pro-white” views, he resigned from his job as a software engineer at Civil Aviation Authority of New Zealand.

Upper Hutt mayor Wayne Guppy said he was disappointed a candidate alleged to have extremist views was standing in Upper Hutt. "Their views have no place in Upper Hutt and no place in New Zealand society."

== Results ==
=== Mayor ===
There was one vacancy for the mayoralty of Upper Hutt. The incumbent since 2001 has been Wayne Guppy.

2022 Upper Hutt mayoral election
Party	Candidate	Votes	%	±%
Independent	Wayne Guppy	5,815	44.94	
Independent	Angela McLeod	4,267	32.98	
Independent	Hellen Swales	1,362	10.52	
Independent	Blair Griffiths	1,346	10.40	
Independent	Keith Bennett	1,324	10.23	
Informal votes		148	1.14	
Majority		1,548	11.96	
Turnout		12,938	43.15	

=== Council ===
There were ten vacancies for the Upper Hutt City Council, elected at-large.

At-large ward
Party	Candidate	Votes	%	±%
Independent	Dave Wheeler	7,390		
Independent	Hellen Swales	7,203		
Independent	Heather Newell	6,600		
Independent	Dylan Bentley	6,459		
Independent	Matthew Carey	6,439		
Independent	Bill Hammond	6,371		
Independent	Emma Holderness	6,345		
Independent	Tracey Ultra	6,303		
Independent	Blair Griffiths	6,092		
Independent	Chris Carson	5,759		
Independent	Konrad Hickson	5,351		
Independent	Cyndi Miller	4,923		
Independent	Paul Lambert	4,896		
Independent	Teresa Homan	4,260		
Independent	Jaap Knegtmans	4,202		
Independent	Keith Bennett	4,100		
Independent	Ramil Adhikari	4,026		
Independent	Dean Spicer	3,570		
Independent	Michael J. Anderson	3,179		
Independent	Michael Hurle	2,669		
Independent	Jordan Milburn	1,585		
Independent	Nigel Mander	1,230		
Informal votes		264		

== Other local elections ==
Upper Hutt voters also voted in concurrent local elections for the:

- Hutt Mana Charitable Trust; and
- Rimutaka Licensing Trust.
