= Black Order (Satanist group) =

Satanist group

The Black Order of Pan Europa
- Predecessor: Order of the Left Hand Path
- Successor: White Order of Thule (schism)
- Formation: 1994
- Founder: Kerry Bolton
- Founded at: New Zealand
- Type: New Religious Movement, Satanism, neo-Nazism,
- Location: Australia, England, Ireland, New Zealand, Scandinavia
- Affiliations: Order of Nine Angles, Ordo Sinistra Vivendi

The Black Order or The Black Order of Pan Europa are a neo-Nazi and Satanist group formerly based in New Zealand. Political scientists Jeffrey Kaplan and Leonard Weinberg characterized the Black Order as a "National Socialist-oriented Satanist mail order ministry".

== Origins ==
The Black Order was founded in New Zealand by Kerry Bolton as a successor to the Order of the Left Hand Path. Bolton had connections to other Neo-Nazi Satanist groups, being the international distributor for the English-based Order of Nine Angles.

According to Nicholas Goodrick-Clarke, "in 1994 Bolton set up the Black Order, which claimed a global network of national lodges in Britain, France, Italy, Finland, Sweden, Germany, the United States of America and Australia, dedicated to fostering National Socialism, fascism, satanism, paganism and other aspects of the European Darkside". Its quarterly membership bulletin The Flaming Sword and its successor zine The Nexus contained interviews with, among others, James Mason, George Eric Hawthorne, Michael Moynihan, David Myatt and Miguel Serrano, and its articles included studies of Thulianism, Himmler's Wewelsburg, tributes to old SS leaders, "a reprint of the ONA Mass of Heresy [and] contributions from David Myatt on the galactic empire, aeonic strategy and the cosmological magic of National Socialism".

In 1996, a U.S. branch of the Black Order was established. In summer that year, they began the publication of a magazine, Abyss. The U.S. group subsequently fell out with New Zealand's branch over the latter's acceptance of homosexual members. The U.S. group considered a name change to the White Order as a result of this schism.

The name "Black Order" was then adopted by ideologically similar groups around the world which had no formal connection to Bolton's group. Kaplan and Weinberg described the Black Order as "a remarkably influential purveyor of National Socialist-oriented occultism throughout the world".
