= Aviation Security Service =

New Zealand government agency

- Kaiwhakamaru Rererangi (Māori)

Agency overview
- Formed: 1977
- Jurisdiction: New Zealand government
- Headquarters: 366 Lambton Quay, Wellington
- Employees: 1309 FTE (2023)
- Parent agency: Civil Aviation Authority
- Website: https://www.aviation.govt.nz/

The Aviation Security Service (Avsec; Māori: Kaiwhakamaru Rererangi) is the operational arm of the New Zealand Civil Aviation Authority (CAA) that is responsible for the delivery of aviation security at security-designated airports. Most of the Service's functions, powers and responsibilities are described in the Civil Aviation Act 1990.

== Organisation ==
The Aviation Security Service was established as a result of the addition of Annex 17 to the Convention on International Civil Aviation which required that passengers and baggage be screened for weapons. It also required that aviation security be maintained through patrols of operational security areas and having trained officers available to respond to breaches of aviation security. As a result, New Zealand established Avsec in 1977 to fulfil these requirements and meet its obligations under the convention.

In terms of governance, the service is part of the CAA and reports to its chief executive. However, it is operationally independent from the regulatory function arm of the authority and is required to have a separate budget.

The service is headquartered at 366 Lambton Quay in Wellington, the same address as the CAA. It also has offices at each of the security-designated airports as well as a training centre in Auckland.

As of 2023, Avsec has 1,309 Full-time equivalent staff, most of whom are based at airports.

=== Functions ===
Avsec's primary activities involve security screening as well as maintaining the security of restricted areas through patrols and an Airport Identity Card system. However, the service does also fulfil other functions.

==== Security screening ====
Avsec undertakes pre-boarding security screening of passengers (and their carry-on baggage) travelling on all international flights as well as domestic flights that operate using aircraft with seats for 90 or more passengers. For international flights, the screening also includes passenger's checked baggage. Currently there are only seven security-designated airports with flights that fall into this category:

Airport	IATA	ICAO	Annual Passengers	Annual Aircraft movements
Auckland Airport	AKL	NZAA	15,861,264	54,007
Hamilton Airport	HLZ	NZHN		
Wellington Airport	WLG	NZWN	5,413,325	41,032
Christchurch Airport	CHC	NZCH	5,690,708	42,653
Dunedin Airport	DUD	NZDN	920,349	
Queenstown Airport	ZQN	NZQN	2,370,320	17,830
Invercargill Airport	IVC	NZNV		9,282

In the 2018/19-year (pre-covid), Avsec screened an estimated 6.9 million International passengers and 7.7 million Domestic passengers.

Security screening is primarily conducted using walk-through metal detectors which all passengers must pass through prior to boarding security-designated flights. Some passengers are also screened using Advanced Imagining Technology (AIT, otherwise known as body scanners). These scanners were first introduced at Auckland for international flights in June 2019 and at Dunedin for domestic flights in August 2019. Since then, they have been progressively rolled-out across all the airports to ensure compliance with international standards and detect aviation security threats that evade traditional screening methods.

==== Other functions ====
In 2018, Avsec began trialing Behavioral Detection Officers at Auckland Airport to observe passengers and detect unusual behaviour that could indicate a threat to aviation security. The trial lead to the establishment of a permanent team at Auckland Airport as well as at Christchurch Airport. Such a practice has been controversial in other countries, due to accusations of racial profiling. However, Avsec insists that this is mitigated through training on unconscious bias as well as the interactions between officers and passengers being reviewed daily by team leaders. The service also claims that the practice has been highly successful in detecting crime including activities such as credit card fraud which do not pose a direct threat to aviation security and is, therefore, referred onwards to the New Zealand Police or Customs Service.
