= Might Is Right =

1896 book advocating social Darwinism

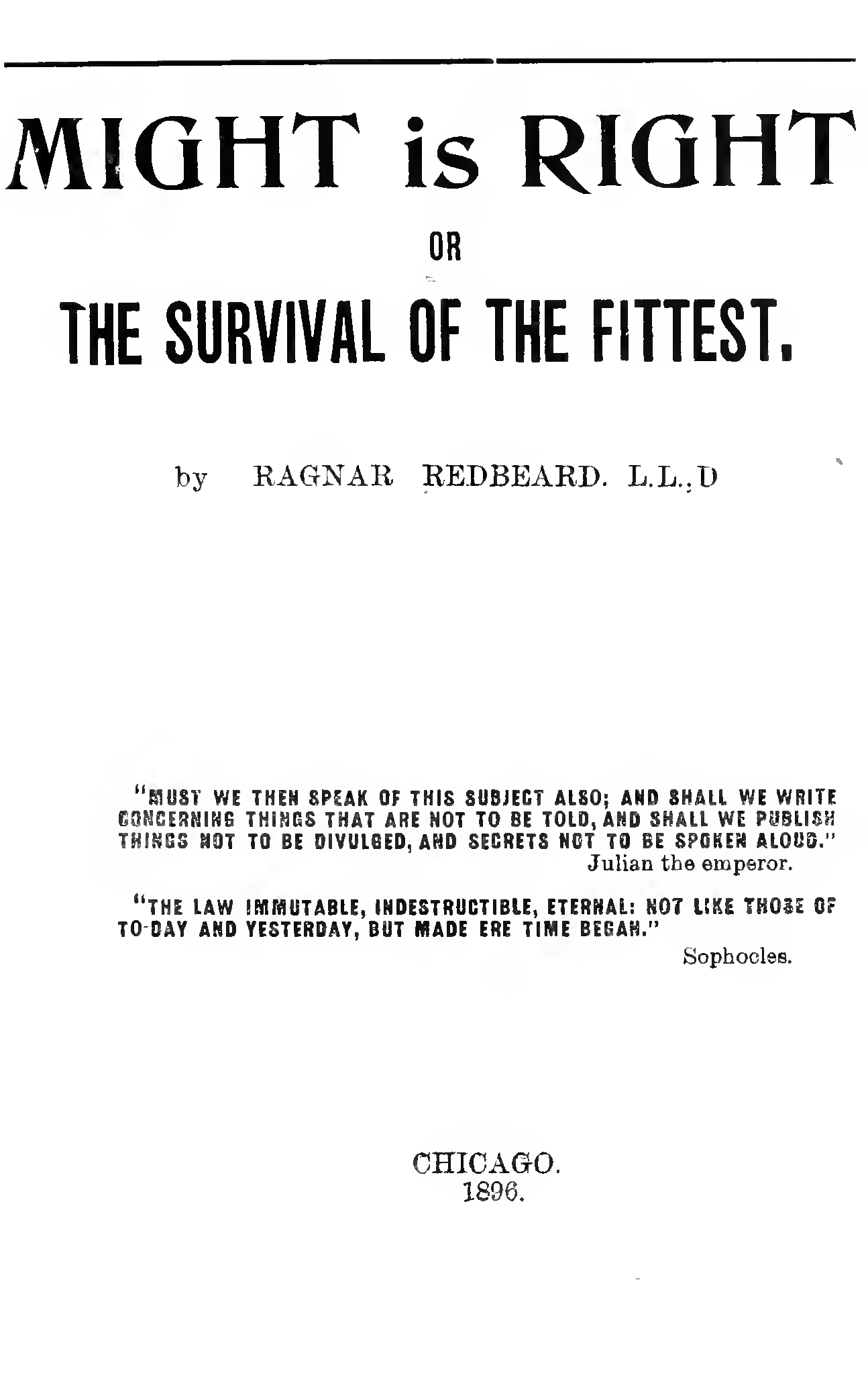
- Title page of the original version
- Author: Ragnar Redbeard (pseudonym)
- Language: English
- Subject: Social Darwinism
- Publication date: 1896
- Publication place: United States
- Media type: Print (hardback and paperback)
- Pages: 182 (paperback)
- ISBN: 9781943687251

Might Is Right or The Survival of the Fittest is a book by pseudonymous author Ragnar Redbeard, generally believed to be a pen name of Arthur Desmond. It was first published in 1896.

== Content ==
The author sums up his work as follows:

This book is a reasoned negation of the Ten Commandments—the Golden Rule–the Sermon on the Mount—Republican Principles—Christian Principles—and "Principles" in general. It proclaims upon scientific evolutionary grounds, the unlimited absolutism of Might, and asserts that cut-and-dried moral codes are crude and immoral inventions, promotive of vice and vassalage.

In Might Is Right, Redbeard rejects conventional ideas such as advocacy of human and natural rights and argues that only strength or physical might can establish moral right (à la Callicles or Thrasymachus). The book also attacks Christianity and democracy. Friedrich Nietzsche's theories of master–slave morality and herd mentality served as inspirations for Redbeard's book which was written contemporaneously.

James J. Martin, the individualist anarchist historian, called it "surely one of the most incendiary works ever to be published anywhere." This refers to the book's assertions that weakness should be regarded with hatred and the strong and forceful presence of social Darwinism. Other parts of the book deal with the topics of race and male–female relations. The book claims that the woman and the family as a whole are the property of the man, and it proclaims that the Anglo-Saxon race is innately superior to all other races. The book also contains anti-Christian and anti-Semitic statements.

== Authorship ==
Anarchist S. E. Parker writes in his introduction to the text: "The most likely candidate is a man named Arthur Desmond who was red-bearded, red-haired and whose poetry was very similar to that written by Redbeard." The Bulletin, a journal associated with the Australian labour movement, reported in July 1900 that Desmond (a former contributor to the publication) was Ragnar Redbeard.

Several observers have proposed Jack London may have written or contributed to Might is Right, a claim made by both Anton LaVey and white supremacist publisher Katja Lane (wife of convicted racketeer David Lane). Lane's assessment was based on her judgment on London's writing style and punctuation. This idea was rejected by writer Rodger Jacobs, a biographer of London, since London was only 20 years old at the time, was busy with college, and had not yet developed a mature writing style, nor had he read anything by Nietzsche.

== Response ==
Leo Tolstoy, whom Might Is Right described as "the ablest modern expounder of primitive Christliness", responded in his 1897 essay What Is Art?:

The substance of this book, as it is expressed in the editor's preface, is that to measure "right" by the false philosophy of the Hebrew prophets and "weepful" Messiahs is madness. Right is not the offspring of doctrine, but of power. All laws, commandments, or doctrines as to not doing to another what you do not wish done to you, have no inherent authority whatever, but receive it only from the club, the gallows, and the sword. A man truly free is under no obligation to obey any injunction, human or divine. Obedience is the sign of the degenerate. Disobedience is the stamp of the hero. Men should not be bound by moral rules invented by their foes. The whole world is a slippery battlefield. Ideal justice demands that the vanquished should be exploited, emasculated, and scorned. The free and brave may seize the world. And, therefore, there should be eternal war for life, for land, for love, for women, for power, and for gold. (Something similar was said a few years ago by the celebrated and refined academician, Vogüé.) The earth and its treasures is "booty for the bold."

The author has evidently by himself, independently of Nietzsche, come to the same conclusions which are professed by the new artists.

Expressed in the form of a doctrine, these positions startle us. In reality, they are implied in the ideal of art serving beauty. The art of our upper classes has educated people in this ideal of the over-man — which is in reality the old ideal of Nero, Stenka Razin, Genghis Khan, Robert Macaire or Napoleon and all their accomplices, assistants, and adulators — and it supports this ideal with all its might.

It is this supplanting of the ideal of what is right by the ideal of what is beautiful, i.e. of what is pleasant, that is the fourth consequence, and a terrible one, of the perversion of art in our society. It is fearful to think of what would befall humanity were such art to spread among the masses of the people. And it already begins to spread.

Parker wrote: "Might Is Right is a work flawed by major contradictions." In particular, he criticized the inconsistency of the book's central dogma of individualism with its open sexism and racism (both requiring a membership in a collective). However, he concluded that "it is sustained by a crude vigor that at its most coherent can help to clear away not a few of the religious, moral and political superstitions bequeathed to us by our ancestors."

== Influence ==
Portions of Might Is Right comprise the vast majority of The Book of Satan in Anton LaVey's 1969 The Satanic Bible, the founding document of the Church of Satan. Though it is no longer included in current printings of The Satanic Bible, early printings included an extensive dedication to various people whom LaVey recognized as influences, including Ragnar Redbeard.

During the early 20th century, Might Is Right had an appreciable impact on the rhetoric of the Industrial Workers of the World (IWW). The slogan "Might is Right" appeared in the union's official organ, the Industrial Worker, from 1909 through the 1930s, often asserting that "MIGHT has always ruled the world" and that organized workers would eventually "have the MIGHT and be RIGHT." The book's verses and philosophy were featured in news reports, editorials, and cartoons, while its merits were debated in Wobbly-affiliated journals like Direct Action and Industrial Pioneer. Some contemporary observers noted that the militant wing of the union effectively used the volume as a "bible" for class struggle.

Santino William Legan, the perpetrator of the 2019 Gilroy Garlic Festival shooting in Gilroy, California, mentioned Might is Right in an Instagram post. NBC journalists have claimed it is a 'staple' of white supremacist groups online.

== Editions ==
Year	Publisher	Notes
1896	Auditorium Press	
1896	A. Uing Publisher	
1903	A. Mueller Publishers	
1910	W.J. Robbins Co. Ltd	
1921	Ross’ Book Service	
1927	Dil Pickle Press	
1962	Unknown publisher	18-page abridged edition.
1969	Same unknown publisher	Expanded 32-page edition.
1972	Revisionist Press	Reprint of 1927 Dil Pickle edition. ISBN 978-1478225171
1984	Loompanics Unlimited	ISBN 0-915179-12-1
1996	M. H. P & Co. Ltd.	Centennial edition, with intro by Anton LaVey.
1999	14 Word Press	St. Maries, Idaho.
2003	Bugbee Books	
2005	Revolva	Russian edition with commentary. ISBN 5-94089-036-5, released online
2005	29 Books	Reprint of 1927 Dil Pickle edition. ISBN 0-9748567-2-X
2005	Dil Pickle Press	Edited and annotated by Darrell W. Conder. ISBN 0-9728233-0-1
2008	Zem Books	ISBN 978-1-329-41381-8
2009	Edition Esoterick	German hardcover edition. ISBN 978-3-936830-31-6
2012	Kustantamo Vuohi Julkaisut	Finnish edition. ISBN 978-952-92-9531-9
2014	Camion Noir	French edition. ISBN 978-235779-620-1
2014	Aristeus Books, ed. Dragan Nikolic	Second ed., eng. edn. ISBN 978-1682040232
2018	Zem Books	Hardcover ed. ISBN 978-1-387-51811-1
2018	Noir Anthologie	Spanish edition. ASIN B07DH2QWS8
2019	Underworld Amusements	The Authoritative Edition, with intro by Peter H. Gilmore. ISBN 978-1943687251
2020	Pentabol N. E.	Spanish Extended Edition. ISBN 978-0244274757
2021	Underworld Amusements	1927 Facsimile Edition. ISBN 978-1-943687-26-8

== See also ==
- Bronze Age Pervert
- Critias
