= National Socialist Party of New Zealand =

- Leader: Colin King-Ansell
- Founded: 1969
- Dissolved: 1980
- Ideology: Neo-Nazism; White supremacy Anti-Arabism
- Political position: Far-right

The National Socialist Party of New Zealand, sometimes called the New Zealand Nazi Party, was a far-right political party in New Zealand. It promulgated the same basic views as Adolf Hitler's Nazi Party in Germany, and had a particular focus on Arabs, Jews and the banking sector.

From 1969 the party was led by Colin King-Ansell. The party came to national attention in 1970 when King-Ansell claimed in a television interview that it included police among its members. The party would be dominated by King-Ansell for the duration of its existence. King-Ansell was the party's sole candidate, and contested several elections.

The party contested the 1972 New Zealand general election on a platform of social credit and establishing trading relations with the Republic of Rhodesia. King-Ansell stood in the Eden electorate, winning 35 votes. He stood again in Eden in 1975, and in 1978 he contested the seat of Onehunga, winning 18 votes.

The party dissolved in 1980.

== Electoral results ==
Election	candidates	seats won	votes	percentage
1972	1	0	35	0.00
1975	1	0	19	0.00
1978	1	0	22	0.00

== See also ==
- National Socialist Party of Australia (1960s-1970s)
