= Arthur Desmond =

New Zealand writer (1859–1929)

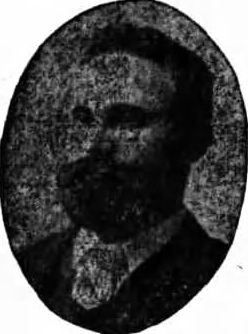
- Desmond before 1901
- Born: Arthur Desmond c. 1859; England or New Zealand
- Died: 23 January 1929 (aged 69–70); Chicago, Illinois, U.S.
- Resting place: Waldheim Cemetery, Gary, Indiana, U.S
- Other names: Ragnar Redbeard (speculated), Arthur Uing, Richard Thurland, Desmond Dilg
- Occupations: Author; reporter; journalist; bookseller
- Known for: Pseudonymous publications
- Spouse: Fredericke "von" Woldt
- Children: 1

Arthur Desmond (Note: Also known as Arthur Uing, Richard Thurland, Desmond Dilg, and Gavin Gowrie.) (c. 1859 – 23 January 1929) was a political activist, poet and author. He lived in New Zealand, Australia, the United States, and England.

Born in either England or New Zealand, Desmond entered the public record in 1884 as a parliamentary candidate in New Zealand, where he became known for his radical views and advocacy for the Māori leader Te Kooti. He moved to Sydney in 1894, where he got involved with the Australian labour movement, as an associate of Billy Hughes, Jack Lang and Henry Lawson. He later moved to the United States.

Desmond is believed to be the author of the 1896 political treatise, Might Is Right, written under the pen name Ragnar Redbeard and printed in Chicago. The book espouses the beliefs of Social Darwinism, that power, strength, and dominance are the mark of a superior human being and that inherent human rights are nonexistent.

== Early years ==
As with most aspects of Arthur Desmond's life, his birth statistics are problematic. Arthur Desmond spent his adult life concealing his origins as well as his identity.

George G. Reeve, Desmond's first biographer, wrote that "To many another person seeking his acquaintance Desmond held aloof, and to a great extent surrounded himself – 'behind the veil' as it were – by a 'mystery halo' and a sacrosanctness hard to penetrate." Desmond’s second biographer, Darrell W. Conder, concurs and indeed, after presenting what is known of Desmond’s life in New Zealand, Australia and America, questions not only Desmond's origins, but even his birth name. George G. Reeve continues: "Arthur Desmond, for that was the real name of 'Ragnar Redbeard', was a native of Hawkes Bay [sic], New Zealand, where he was born about the year 1842 of Irish ancestry." The International Communist in 1921 carried a short article on Desmond in which it was claimed that he was "a native of Napier, Hawkes Bay [sic], Maoriland." New Zealand National Dictionary biographer Rachel Barrowman adds: "Arthur Desmond was unknown to the electors of Hawke's Bay when he stood for Parliament in 1884. 'We only know that Mr. Desmond is a cattle-drover, and that he is of radical tendencies', the editor of the Hawke's Bay Herald wrote. He was said to be 25 years old [placing his birth in 1859], born in New Zealand of Irish descent. He had been in Hawke's Bay since the late 1870s, and had worked as a musterer in south Taranaki. Of his background and personal life nothing more is known."

However, the most detailed information about Arthur Desmond's origins come from records after his immigration to the United States in 1895–96. On the occasion of his first appearance in a US census record in 1900, Desmond declared that he was born in England in the year 1859 of parents who were also born in England. This declaration was backed by Desmond's Illinois death certificate on which his son stated that Desmond and his father were both natives of Northumberland, England. This information is corroborated by Desmond's 1904 Chicago marriage record. In that instance Desmond declared that he was born in place called Claud, Northumberland, England in 1859 to Samuel Desmond and Sarah Ewing. Nevertheless, to compound matters, in the 1910 US census record Arthur Desmond claimed his birthplace as California, but changed that to England in his last census appearance in 1920.

Whatever his real origins, the first concrete evidence of Arthur Desmond’s life comes when he stood for parliament in Hawke’s Bay, New Zealand in 1884. His two addresses to the Electors of Hawke’s Bay survive. In one of the addresses, Desmond said: "You, yourselves, are principally to blame for allowing this in the past. You have allowed great squatters of the worst type to rule you to their own advantage; they have themselves grabbed the good land, and they attempt to pose as your friends by offering you the crumbs that fall from their table. You have the power in your own hands now, and if you do not wish to be for ever serfs of territorial gods almighty; if you have got any of the energy of your progenitors, you will not stand this kind of injustice any longer. You will say to them with me — Wealth that we make for you, money we earn; give us our share of them, give us a turn. If you have the pluck to say this, then return me as your representative, and I will lead you."

Of the three candidates in the electorate, Desmond came last, garnering a dismal 190 votes. However, he did not leave active politics and sought out the patronage of Sir George Grey. As Sir George was a staunch defender of the Māori, Desmond also took up their cause, a move that was controversial in the New Zealand of his day.

In 1887 Desmond stood for Parliament for a second time, this time running on a platform that consisted of a concentrated attack on landlords, bankers and monopolists. Desmond advocated land reform; the nationalisation of large estates and banks; and Henry George's single taxation — a proposal that taxation should be confined to land rent, since, in Desmond's view, land was the real source of wealth. When he publicly denounced bank directors as "scoundrels," estate owners as "blood-sucking leeches," and the local press as "hirelings of monopoly," Desmond was essentially standing on a socialist platform. Additionally, Desmond championed the Crown's right of pre-emption of Māori land, which meant the resumption of the Treaty of Waitangi agreement whereby only the Crown could buy land from the Māori. This move made Desmond a lot of enemies among European New Zealanders, but made a respectable showing of 562 votes to the 968 of the sitting member, Capt. William Russell.

Following his election loss, Desmond left the area to find work in the timber mills of Poverty Bay and on the farms of the Waikato. Of those hard times he would write: "Many a time when lying on my back in a bush whare or a tent after a day of grinding toil, have I resolved that if ever I had a chance to sweep away such a brutal system, it would not be neglected."

== Defense of Te Kooti ==
In February 1889, 60-year-old Te Kooti, the leader of the Hau Haus, decided to visit Gisborne, the land of his birth. This impending visit caused an uproar among the European population because they were convinced that the chief was there to prevent the sale of Māori land. For Arthur Desmond, Te Kooti's action was disastrous since he found himself in the untenable position of supporting the chief against New Zealand's European population over an issue that had been a major plank in his parliamentary platform— the Crown's right of preemption.

In Poverty Bay, at a packed schoolhouse in Makaraka, Desmond faced a meeting of some five hundred angry settlers on Te Kooti's behalf. Amidst talk of armed resistance and bloodshed, Desmond explained to his brethren that he knew many of the chief's supporters and that the Māori meant them no harm. His arguments were unsuccessful, and in the resulting chaos some of the settlers grabbed Desmond and bodily threw him from the schoolhouse.

Several days later another meeting of some eight hundred settlers took place, and a resolution was passed to stop Te Kooti's visit — by force if necessary. Once again Arthur Desmond was there to speak in favour of the chief. When he let it slip that he had been in contact with the Māori leaders and went on to forcefully threaten that the settlers had no legal or moral right to interfere with Te Kooti's visit, fights erupted. This time police officers had to escort Desmond from the meeting for his own protection. In the New Zealand Herald Desmond was called the "pakeha [white] emissary from the Hau Haus" and was reported lucky to have left the meeting alive.

In the end the crisis was averted when Te Kooti and seventy of his followers were arrested by the government and thrown in jail. Desmond went on to pen a poem dedicated to Chief Te Kooti, which he titled the "Song of Te Kooti."

== Might Is Right ==
According to the preface of the 1896 edition of Might Is Right, which was published with the sub-title of The Survival of the Fittest, it was in the aftermath of his 1887 parliamentary bid that Arthur Desmond first conceived of and began writing Might Is Right. In 1890 Desmond submitted an essay to the magazine Zealandia which was published in the June issue with the title of "Christ as a Social Reformer." The essay amounted to a veiled call for Christian men to take up arms in a socialist revolution. The Zealandia article was so well received that Desmond decided to publish it as a booklet and, as added prestige, used one of Sir George Grey's personal letters as a preface.

Whatever the intended outcome of the article, one that was not foreseen was the charge by Desmond's enemies that he had plagiarised "Christ as a Social Reformer" from an American magazine. The charge was serious enough that a highly embarrassed Arthur Desmond finally worked up the pluck to write to Sir George Grey. However, when one reads his protestations of innocence to Sir George, they seem to be an admission that the charges were correct.

Charges of plagiarism were not confined to "Christ as a Social Reformer." When Desmond's poem "The King that is to Come" was reprinted as "The Leader of the Future", he was accused of plagiarising the piece from American poet James Whitcomb Riley's "The Poet of the Future." A comparison of the two poems bears out the charge of plagiarism.

Amidst this controversy, Desmond was very active on behalf of workers' rights. During the 1890 Maritime Strike, Desmond wrote: "How can we expect just legislation and equal laws when those who control private plundering concerns are our legislators?" Desmond was relentless with his condemnation of employers and those who, he said, had a "strangle hold" on Auckland’s commerce. At the head of his list was the Bank of New Zealand, which he charged was rife with corruption (and had to be bailed out by the Government in 1894).

While openly writing against the government and big business, in 1890 Arthur Desmond produced twenty-five typewritten copies of what he would later designate as the first edition of Might Is Right. Using the pseudonym "Redbeard" ("Ragnar" would be added to the name five years later), this first edition filled only 16 small pages and was titled Might Is Right Logic of To-Day. This edition also carried the notation "for private circulation" and "printed in Sydney" on the title page.

== Emigration to Australia ==
On 10 October 1892, Arthur Desmond left New Zealand on the S.S. Houroto for Sydney, New South Wales, Australia. Upon arriving in Sydney he became associated with William Morris Hughes, later Prime Minister of Australia. Desmond collaborated with Hughes on a political broadsheet which evolved into a radical periodical titled The New Order, and he became part of the circle surrounding McNamara's Bookshop at 221 Castlereagh Street (demolished in 1922), associating with Louisa Lawson and her son Henry, Jack Lang, Tommy Walker, and future Prime Minister Alfred Deakin. On 11 June 1893, appeared the first issue of Hard Cash, a seditious and provocative periodical instigated by Desmond and Lang. Hard Cash was printed in a secret location, and promoted an "Active Service Brigade" devoted to disrupting the political rallies of Desmond's opponents — a practice which eventually necessitated Desmond's fleeing the country with warrants out for his arrest. The "bush poet" Henry Lawson composed a poem in defence of Desmond which appeared in the New Zealand periodical Fair Play in December 1893; it reads in part:

=== Arthur Desmond ===
They are stoning Arthur Desmond, and, of course it's understood
By the people of New Zealand that he isn't any good.
He's a plagiarist, they tell us, and a scamp – but after all,
He is fighting pretty plucky with his back against the wall.

They are damning Arthur Desmond for the battle that he fought –
For his awful crime in saying what so many people thought.
He was driven from the country – but I like to see fair play –
and to slander absent brothers – why it ain't New Zealand's way.

Once I met Arthur Desmond "and I took him by the hand",
But I scarcely think the action spoilt my chance for the Promised Land;
And I think of Arthur gazing, with his earnest, thoughtful eyes,
Out beyond the brighter ages that we cannot realise.

== Philosophy ==
In Might Is Right, writing as Ragnar Redbeard, Desmond outlines his philosophy of society, authority, power, violence and religion. Believing Judaism and Christianity to be religions of the weak, his book contains many anti-Christian and anti-Semitic statements. The opening lines of Might Is Right: "Death to the weakling, wealth to the strong", illustrate his belief that weakness correlates with death and strength correlates with life. Desmond explains that supporting weakness is unnatural and dangerous for species survival; competition, strength, and dominance being prime natural values.

Desmond was a proponent of Social Darwinism and believed organised religion was particularly harmful to personal growth and ambition. His views on inalienable human rights proposes that they are entirely non-existent. Desmond describes rights as "spoils" of the conquering man and only something to be enjoyed when they are earned or won, rather than given.

== Publication, legal troubles, and association with socialism ==
Culminating with the release of Might Is Right, Arthur Desmond's literary career consistently advocated open revolution against the government. Desmond's friends, future Australian Prime Minister Billy Hughes and John Andrews, would call him "the Poet of Revolution" and "poet, actuary and revolutionary." This observation is backed by another of Desmond's Sydney friends, future New South Wales Premier Jack Lang, who remembered Desmond as "a real revolutionary."

Arthur Desmond's ability to promote his ideas can be seen by the influence he exerted on his associates. One of these was the Australian poet Henry Lawson. After his friendship with Desmond, Lawson's poetry took a radical turn. (Of Arthur Desmond, Prime Minister Billy Hughes recalled "His command of scarifying language was appalling.... Poetry oozed out of him at every pore.") Desmond exerted some influence on Lawson, and one critic has charged Henry Lawson with fascism, racism and even Nazism by drawing a comparison of his poetic sentiments to Adolf Hitler's Mein Kampf. However, Manning Clarke and Colin Roderick have refuted such claims, pointing to Lawson's own unambiguous statement in print in the Albany Observer (Western Australia) from 1890: "Class, creed and nationality are words which should find no place in the vocabulary of the Australians, because these words are synonymous with everything that is hostile to peace and happiness in the world."

Throughout his time in Sydney, Arthur Desmond worked to start a revolution with himself at its head. He was involved in the Active Service Brigade, producing their journal, Justice for the Active Service Brigade, which was ultimately superseded by Desmond’s own journal, Hard Cash, subtitled "A magazine for finance, politics and religion."

Verity Burgmann notes that the ASB has been described as "highly centralised and secretive" and that the organisation "described itself as a 'strictly disciplined organization.' The Declaration signed by each member promised to assist in electing the ASB’s Supreme Directing Council, ‘and when duly elected and installed to obey their lawful commands — without question.’" The Brigade’s objectives were thus stated: "For the Nation — Social Co-operation. For the Citizen — Emancipation from Poverty Conditions, Competitive Commercialism, Industrial Wage Slavery, Tyrannical Authority, and Mental Bondage."

Bob James writes: "Vance Marshall has claimed that ‘for six years… [Desmond’s] finger was traceable in every decisive movement associated with the [Australian] working class."

Hard Cash and other writings of Desmond's succeeded in infuriating the authorities and Desmond's own superiors. Colonial Secretary George R. Dibbs is reported to have held up a copy of Hard Cash during a cabinet meeting and said: "This thing has cost us £3,000,000. What is the detective force of this city doing?" A high level of pressure being brought to bear, Sydney’s police attempted to shut down Hard Cash and to put Arthur Desmond in prison.

Not being able to locate Desmond, authorities arrested newsagents William McNamara and Samuel A. Rosa in a show trial known as the Sydney Anarchy Trial of February 1894. Both McNamara and Rosa refused to name Desmond as the journal’s publisher. Justice Foster sentenced McNamara to six months in Parramatta Gaol and gave Rosa three months.

With McNamara and Rosa in jail, Hard Cash closed down. Arthur Desmond continued to publish incitement against the government. The police then targeted the Active Service Brigade and its journal, Justice. The detective's attempts still failed, although by June he had arrested five men in Desmond’s stead and Sydney held another anarchy trial.

The Sydney Anarchy Trial of June 1894 saw Henry Tregarthan Douglas, John Dwyer, printer William Mason, Thomas Dodd, and printer’s assistant George MacNevin standing before Justice Sir George Long-Innes in the Central Criminal Court, Sydney. The charge was criminal libel, which arose from a single paragraph published in Justice on 21 April 1894. The trial lasted little more than a day. On 13 June, after only a thirty-minute deliberation, the jury returned guilty verdicts for all defendants. Judge Long-Innes, saying that it was "not desirable to stir up class hatreds in the community," handed down terms of hard labour. Douglas, Dodd, and Mason each received a nine-month sentence; Dwyer received six months and MacNevin one month. Long-Innes also ordered the prisoners sent to different prisons in an attempt to break up their association.

After the notorious anarchy trials, the Australian Labor Party offered Desmond a seat in the New South Wales Parliament representing Durham in 1894. However, Desmond refused the position, "vehemently denounced those responsible for the canvass and absolutely refused to go for Parliamentary honors." Instead, Desmond produced another journal, aimed at denouncing and attacking Justice Minister Thomas Slattery. This time, Desmond's journal, The Standard Bearer, named him openly as the editor. In The Standard Bearer, Desmond repeated "the same formula of bank bashing and anti-Semitism."

== Emigration to the United States ==
With Justice Minister Thomas Slattery breathing fire, in the summer of 1894 Desmond folded The Standard Bearer and its successor, Hard Kash, after only three issues, and decided to take a permanent vacation. Desmond’s friend, John Andrews, writes: "[Desmond] quitted Australia in disgust, and, according to one report, went to South Africa to enlist under Cecil Rhodes, who was then intent on founding a new Republic."

Whether or not Desmond actually went to South Africa to fight with Rhodes is unknown. However, his attitude towards Rhodes was something akin to hero-worship and is a conspicuous feature of Might Is Right. What is certain is that Desmond left Australia one step ahead of the law — a warrant for his arrest for sedition and treasonable utterances already having been issued. Eventually Desmond turned up in England where he turned out numerous revolutionary poetic pieces, most notably his "The Flames of Freedom," which he signed "Catiline." Like the historic Catiline, Desmond advocated purifying the world by fire, which explains why he dared not put his name to the piece. From England Desmond travelled to New York, as his friend Julian Stuart recalled: "Soon after I got a letter from New York saying he was taking another name just for luck".

Desmond had several Australian friends with contacts in Chicago, which likely explains why he chose Chicago as his new home. His occupation is listed as "reporter" in the 1896 Chicago city directory. The preface to the 1896 Chicago edition of Might Is Right (re-titled The Survival of the Fittest, or the Philosophy of Power) indicates that Desmond spent much of 1895 looking for a publisher. When The Survival of the Fittest was finally published in 1896, Desmond used the pseudonym "Arthur Uing" (a variation of his mother's maiden name, Ewing).

One of the first individuals to receive a copy of The Survival of the Fittest was Desmond's Sydney friend, John Dwyer. His personal copy of The Survival of the Fittest is now preserved in the Dwyer Papers at the Mitchell Collection of State Library of New South Wales, and in that original one finds that Dwyer had written on the title page under "Ragnar Redbeard" the name "Arthur Desmond."

In 1897, a business called the Adolph Mueller Company was established at 108 South Clark Street, Chicago, whose sole interest seems to have been promoting and selling Ragnar Redbeard's books and writings. It was about this time that Desmond began promoting his supposed doctorate of law (LL.D.) from the University of Chicago. Aided by staff members, Desmond biographer Darrell Conder extensively researched the records of the University of Chicago and found no such doctorate had ever been awarded. In fact, the U of C's first LL.D. was awarded to President William McKinley in 1897, a year after Desmond claimed he had acquired his doctorate.

In 1898, Arthur Desmond travelled to London, where he published a British edition of The Survival of the Fittest. While in London he joined John Basil Barnhill, who used the pseudonym John Erwin McCall, to produce yet another journal, The Eagle and the Serpent, promoting Friedrich Nietzsche's philosophy. While there Desmond also released a booklet titled Women and War printed by Holbrook & Daniels, London, 1898. The booklet was, in fact, simply a reprint of chapter six of The Survival of the Fittest. Desmond also printed a series of pamphlets he titled Redbeard's Review, which were meant to draw attention to his book.

About this time Arthur Desmond would later claim that he took time off to involve himself in South Africa's Second Boer War, that he was in fact "a member of Gen. 'Bob's’ light horse at Cape Town and Pretoria." Arthur Desmond also claimed to have been in the largest and bloodiest single battle of the Boer War – the Battle of Paardeberg in February 1900. When Desmond was arrested and put on trial in Chicago in 1904, he made newspaper headlines by claiming that the rifle he used to hold off a troop of Chicago police officers was one he had captured in the Battle of Baardeberg.

By 1902, Desmond was living in Chicago under the alias "Richard Thurland" and publishing another edition of The Survival of the Fittest, which he re-titled Might Is Right, or the Survival of the Fittest and released in 1903 through Adolph Mueller Publishers. During this time Desmond set up an advertising partnership with prominent Chicagoan Will H. Dilg called Thurland & Thurland, of which Arthur Desmond is listed as manager in the 1903 Chicago City Directory. Dilg and Desmond were involved in more than a commercial venture. They also co-wrote a book titled Rival Caesars (subtitled A Romance of Ambition, Love and War. Being the tale of a Vice-President, a Major-General and three brilliant and beautiful women), using the pseudonym "Desmond Dilg." The book was released in 1903 by Desmond's own Thurland & Thurland Publishers, Chicago; it was the only book ever printed by the company.

Desmond biographer Darrell W. Conder uses persuasive argument, including quotes from Rival Caesars' blatant 'might is right' philosophy, to show that Desmond's latest book was in some sense a sequel to Might Is Right. Rival Caesars was not a commercial success, making surviving copies of the book very rare. Shortly after its release the partnership between Desmond and Dilg ceased.

By 1904, Thurland & Thurland and Desmond Commercial Advertising Bureau were located in the single office of the general manager of the Ser-Vis Ice Cream and Candy Company at 155 Michigan Street. The reason for the shared address was that Arthur Desmond was the general manager of the Ser-Vis Ice Cream and Candy Company and was using his company office for an advertising sideline. These facts emerged 18 March 1904 when Desmond was arrested in his office.

The trouble began when a telephone inspector wanted to enter the factory for some routine maintenance, which Desmond refused. The man returned with police, and Desmond responded by holding them off with his rifle (which, he claimed, he had captured in the Boer War). In the end, Desmond was overpowered and thrown in the Cook County Jail to await trial. However, Desmond's oratory skills convinced a judge and jury that he was the victim and he was set free.

== Personal life, last years, and death ==
On 1 September 1904, the 45-year-old Arthur Desmond married 22-year-old Fredericke Woldt in the parish house of St. James Episcopal Church (now St. James Cathedral, Chicago). Desmond was an atheist, but may have conceded to a church wedding because Fredericke's family was staunchly religious.

Desmond and Woldt had a son, Arthur Konar Walther Desmond, often found listed in records as Arthur Desmond Jr. or Arthur Thurland Jr. In 1910, Desmond was living alone with his young son at 2647 Reese Avenue in Evanston, Illinois; he reported to the census taker that he was a widower, although his wife Fredericke was in fact alive and living with her family in Gary, Indiana. On 4 May 1913, Fredericke Desmond died of pulmonary tuberculosis in a Logansport, Indiana sanatarium, aged 31 years. She was buried in the Waldheim Cemetery in Gary, Indiana, beside her parents.

In Evanston, Desmond opened a book-selling business he called Thurland & Thurland Booksellers, and produced another journal titled The Lion's Paw. This latest journal was anti-government, anti-religion and heavily promoted the philosophy of "might is right." At this time Desmond contracted with W. J. Robbins & Co., of London, to reprint a new edition of Might Is Right. Desmond also sold other books under the Thurland & Thurland imprint by pasting his own labels over the original publishers' on the title page.

At some point after 1911, Arthur Desmond dissolved Thurland & Thurland and left Evanston for his old neighbourhood on Chicago's Near North Side, where he rented an apartment at 1615 Granville Avenue near the Newberry Library. Just a few blocks from his apartment, at 364 Wendell Street, Desmond opened a used bookstore named the "House O' Gowrie, Importers – Publishers – Printers – Booksellers." The House O' Gowrie was run solely by "Richard Thurland", a.k.a., Arthur Desmond.

In the 1920s, Arthur Desmond met Jack Jones, the owner of the Near North Side's Dil Pickle Club. In 1927 Jones' Dil Pickle Press reworked the original Might Is Right printing plates to produce the last Redbeard-era edition of Might Is Right. These were sold from Desmond's House O' Gowrie and from Jones' Dil Pickle Club.

On the morning of 23 January 1929, Arthur Desmond suffered a stroke in his apartment at 1353 North Clark Street. He was taken to Cook County Hospital, where he was pronounced dead. Desmond's Illinois death certificate lists his name as "Arthur Desmond, alias Richard Thurland." An autopsy performed by Dr. E. L. Benjamin found that Desmond had died of a "spontaneous cerebral hemorrhage."
