= Civil Aviation Authority of New Zealand =

Aviation safety and security standards authority

Civil Aviation Authority
- Te Mana Rererangi Tūmatanui o Aotearoa (Māori)

Agency overview
- Formed: 1992
- Jurisdiction: New Zealand government
- Headquarters: Wellington
- Employees: 1770 FTE (2023)
- Annual budget: $212.7 million (2023)
- Minister responsible: Chris Bishop, Minister of Transport
- Agency executives: Janice Fredric, Chair; Keith Manch, Director of Civil Aviation
- Parent agency: Ministry of Transport
- Child agency: Aviation Security Service
- Website: www.aviation.govt.nz

The Civil Aviation Authority of New Zealand (CAA) (Māori: Te Mana Rererangi Tūmatanui o Aotearoa) is the government agency tasked with establishing civil aviation safety and security standards in New Zealand. The CAA also monitors adherence to those standards and is responsible for enforcement proceedings. The authority "investigates and reviews accident and incident investigations in its capacity as the responsible safety and security authority, subject to the limitations set out in section 14(3) of the Transport Accident Investigation Commission Act 1990" (TAIC). CAA is also responsible for managing civilian pilot, aerodrome and aircraft licensing in New Zealand. The CAA has its headquarters in the Asteron Centre in Featherston Street, Wellington.

== Ministers of Civil Aviation ==
Before a Civil Aviation portfolio was created in 1946, ministerial authority had rested with the Minister of Defence. The position of Minister for Civil Aviation was abolished just before the 1990 election where after aviation remained under the Minister of Transport. However the government formed the Civil Aviation Authority in 1992 to regulate aviation separately from the Ministry of Transport. It was reinstated as a full ministerial portfolio in 1999.

The following ministers have held ministerial responsibility for Civil Aviation.

Key

Labour National Greens

No.	Name	Portrait	Term of Office		Prime Minister
1	Fred Jones		1 June 1946	13 December 1949	Fraser
2	Stan Goosman		13 December 1949	8 December 1950	Holland
3	Tom Macdonald		8 December 1950	26 November 1954	Holland
4	Tom Shand		26 November 1954	12 December 1957	Holland
4	Tom Shand		26 November 1954	12 December 1957	Holyoake
5	John Mathison		12 December 1957	12 December 1960	Nash
6	John McAlpine		12 December 1960	12 December 1966	Holyoake
7	Peter Gordon		12 December 1966	8 December 1972	Holyoake
7	Peter Gordon		12 December 1966	8 December 1972	Marshall
8	Martyn Finlay		8 December 1972	12 December 1975	Kirk
8	Martyn Finlay		8 December 1972	12 December 1975	Rowling
9	Colin McLachlan		12 December 1975	11 December 1981	Muldoon
10	George Gair		11 December 1981	26 July 1984	Muldoon
11	Richard Prebble		26 July 1984	24 August 1987	Lange
12	Bill Jeffries		24 August 1987	2 November 1990	Lange
12	Bill Jeffries		24 August 1987	2 November 1990	Palmer
12	Bill Jeffries		24 August 1987	2 November 1990	Moore
13	Rob Storey		2 November 1990	29 November 1993	Bolger
14	Maurice Williamson		29 November 1993	16 December 1996	Bolger
15	Jenny Shipley		16 December 1996	8 December 1997	Bolger
(14)	Maurice Williamson		8 December 1997	10 December 1999	Shipley
16	Mark Gosche		10 December 1999	27 July 2002	Clark
17	Paul Swain		27 July 2002	26 February 2004	Clark
18	Pete Hodgson		26 February 2004	19 October 2005	Clark
19	David Parker		19 October 2005	21 March 2006	Clark
20	Annette King		21 March 2006	19 November 2008	Clark
21	Steven Joyce		19 November 2008	12 December 2011	Key
22	Gerry Brownlee		12 December 2011	6 October 2014	Key
23	Simon Bridges		6 October 2014	26 October 2017	Key
23	Simon Bridges		6 October 2014	26 October 2017	English
24	Phil Twyford		26 October 2017	24 May 2018	Ardern
25	Julie Anne Genter		24 May 2018	6 November 2020	Ardern
26	Michael Wood		6 November 2020	21 June 2023	Ardern
26	Michael Wood		6 November 2020	21 June 2023	Hipkins
27	Simeon Brown		27 November 2023	Present	Luxon

== History ==
=== Action Zealandia ===
In 2022, Jordan Milburn ran for 2022 Upper Hutt City Council election. After anti-racism group Paparoa accused Milburn of having links to neo-nazi group Action Zealandia and espousing “pro-white” views, he resigned from his job as a software engineer at Civil Aviation Authority of New Zealand.

In 2023, it was found that another Action Zealandia member, James Fairburn, who hosted a podcast with Milburn, was employed between August and December 2022. An article about Fairburn's ties to Action Zealandia in 2020 was publicly available on Newsroom and Stuff.co.nz before his hiring. Civil Aviation Authority did not answer questions, citing individual employment matters. Green Member of Parliament Julie Anne Genter, who was formerly Minister of Civil Aviation, said the revelation called for urgently review its hiring processes. "We are particularly concerned in light of the observations by the Royal commission inquiry into the Christchurch mosque attack about the risk posed by far-right extremism."

In 2025, Civil Aviation Authority of New Zealand admits failure in hiring white supremacists Jordan Milburn and James Fairburn.

== See also ==
- Airways New Zealand
- Gliding New Zealand
- History of aviation in New Zealand
