= New Zealand National Front =

- Leader: Colin King-Ansell
- Founded: 1968
- Dissolved: 2019
- Membership (2019): ▼30
- Ideology: Ultranationalism; White nationalism Anti-Māori sentiment Homophobia; Islamophobia; Anti-immigration
- Political position: Far-right
- Colors: Red, white and blue (New Zealand national colours)

Party flag

The New Zealand National Front was a small white nationalist organisation in New Zealand.

== History ==
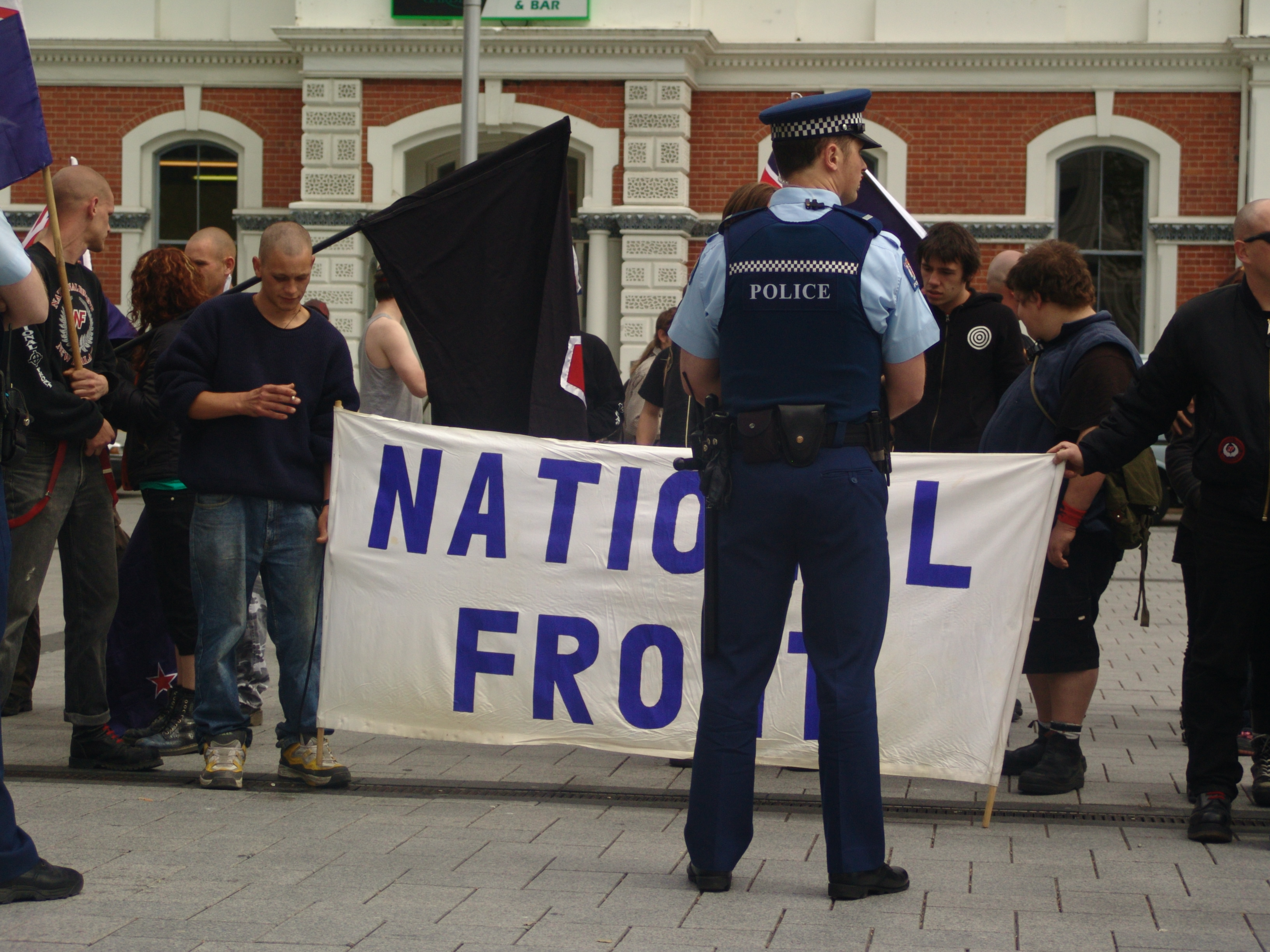
NZ National Front members at a protest in 2007, with a policeman watching nearby

=== First formation in 1967 ===
Mirroring developments in the UK, a group called the National Front evolved from the New Zealand branch of the League of Empire Loyalists in 1967. It was led by Brian Thompson; another notable member was Roger Clare who would later become an activist with the League of St George. It published a magazine called Counter-attack. This group dissolved by the beginning of the 1970s. Thompson remained an overseas supporter of the UK National Front.

=== Recreation of the late 1970s ===
"All white countries and only white countries are being flooded with hundreds of millions of non-white people... diversity is just a codeword for white genocide"

— National Front, promotion

The National Front of New Zealand, commonly known as the "New Zealand National Front" (NZNF), was an initiative of John Tyndall of the British National Front formed in 1977. Sister organisations were also formed in Australia and South Africa at the same time.

The party's first chairman was David Crawford, aided by Brian Thompson. Kerry Bolton joined in 1978. It distributed "large numbers of Holocaust denial pamphlets and books". Thompson represented the party at the march in Lewisham in 1977. The party encouraged its activists to infiltrate mainstream parties such as the National Party. From June 1978 the party jointly published a magazine called Frontline with the National Front of Australia. After the end of the Australian group in 1984, the magazine continued until March 1987 in support of a more general non-party "nationalist cause".

The organisation became close to ending during the early 1980s; many of its members left to form the 'New Force' which Bolton formed in 1981.

=== Later activity ===
In 1989 Anton Foljambe sought to revive the Frontline title for his "Conservative Front" grouping. This led to the reformation of the NZNF with Foljambe as leader. It published a magazine, edited by Foljambe, called Viewpoint. Foljambe resigned as leader in 1997 and established the rival National Democrats Party in 1999. Kyle Chapman, who said he had been interested in right-wing politics since the age of 12, then led the party until he resigned as leader in 2005. Bolton rejoined the party in 2004. From 2008, Colin Ansell led the group. Ansell stated that the group was to be a "broad spectrum nationalist movement" with a "strong view on immigration".

On 23 October 2004, the National Front held a protest in Wellington to support retaining the current New Zealand flag, which was attended by an estimated 45 people. An 800-strong counter-demonstration was organised by the MultiCultural Aotearoa coalition and anarchists to expose the sympathies of the National Front. According to The New Zealand Herald, Chapman complained the following day of "insufficient police protection". This "Flag Day Rally" has now become an annual event, with NF members and protesters squaring off outside parliament.

In October 2017, a handful of National Front members protested outside Parliament. They were met by "a sea" of counter-protesters. Fights came close to breaking out and police attended the event.

After the Christchurch mosque shootings of 2019, the National Front like other far-right groups "publicly shut up shop" and largely went underground. An RNZ documentary of April 2019 described them as "the old guard of the far-right" in comparison to new movements with more sophisticated networks and use of technology.

== As a political party ==
The National Front has described itself as a political party, in 2010. Leader Kyle Chapman contested the 2004 Christchurch mayoral election, receiving 1,665 votes (1.9%) and coming fifth out of ten candidates. In a blog post, then-former-leader Kyle Chapman declared the National Front would be joining with the National Democrats and another international organisation, the 'New Right' to contest the 2008 election under the name "Nationalist Alliance". This did not occur; no candidates contested the 2008 election under that name.

== Policies ==
According to Te Ara: The Encyclopedia of New Zealand, the discernible policies of the National Front are "homophobia, racism and patriotic nationalism."

== Leaders ==
Name	Start year	End year	Time in office
Kay Hopper	1968	1977	9 years
David Crawford	1977	1989	12 years
Anton Foljambe	1989	1997	8 years
Kyle Chapman	1997	2005	8 years
Colin Ansell	2008	2019?	

== See also ==
- Far-right politics in New Zealand
- List of white nationalist organizations
- Politics of New Zealand
