= Colin King-Ansell =

New Zealand far-right politician

Durward Colin King-Ansell (born 1947) is a prominent figure in far-right politics in New Zealand. He has been the leader of the National Socialist Party of New Zealand (New Zealand Nazi Party), the National Socialist White People's Party, the New Zealand Fascist Union and the New Zealand National Front.

== Biography ==
In December 1967 King-Ansell received an 18-month prison sentence for damage to a synagogue, and was released in January 1969. He subsequently described himself as anti-Jew rather than National Socialist at that time, but shortly after founded the National Socialist Party of New Zealand, sometimes called the New Zealand Nazi Party, in June 1969. In 2006 he declared that he had renounced Nazism in 1981, but was involved with the neo-Nazi Unit 88 after that.

King-Ansell first achieved national New Zealand notice in 1970 following an interview in the Salient magazine and a subsequent appearance on a television current affairs programme. He said that he did not believe that the Nazis had gas chambers. He stood for the National Socialists in the general elections of 1972 and 1975 he contested the Eden electorate and in 1978 he contested the seat of Onehunga. In 1978 he was fined $400 following an appeal against a three-month prison sentence for breaching the Race Relations Act from his involvement in printing and distributing a flyer that was deemed to be antisemitic.

The National Socialist Party of New Zealand disbanded in 1980. By 1978, King-Ansell was leading an organisation called the National Socialist White People's Party, affiliated with George Lincoln Rockwell's American party of the same name. In March 1997 he founded the New Zealand Fascist Union. He is the former chairman of the New Zealand National Front.

In 2006, King-Ansell became president of a local business association, Progress Hawera, but was expelled when his far-right past was exposed. His business was reportedly burgled and set on fire in 2019.
