= Lifeline utility =

In New Zealand, an essential service during major emergencies

In New Zealand, a lifeline utility is a service defined under one of the Schedules of the Civil Defence Emergency Management Act 2002.

The duties of lifeline utilities are defined in Section 60 of the Act. In short, a lifeline utility is legally required to function 'to the fullest possible extent' (even at a diminished level) during and after an emergency, participate in emergency management planning, and provide free-of-charge technical assistance to the Director of Civil Defence Emergency Management.

Lifeline utilities under Schedule 1 include Radio NZ, TVNZ, airport companies and authorities, port companies and authorities, gas utilities, water utilities, power utilities, telecommunications networks, roading authorities, petroleum companies, rail network operators, and rail service operators.

== CDEM Guidelines for Lifelines utilities ==
In June 2014, the Director of the Ministry of Civil Defence & Emergency Management issued a guideline for Lifeline utilities, pursuant to s9(3) of the Civil Defence Emergency Management (CDEM) Act 2002. This guideline describes how lifeline utilities may meet their obligations under the CDEM Act 2002 and the National CDEM Strategy.

== Regional lifelines groups ==
There are Lifelines Groups operating in most regions of New Zealand. These generally have an informal relationship with regional CDEM Groups, but some are defined within the structures of CDEM Group plans. During events when either a regional emergency management centre or the National Crisis Management Centre is mobilised, a Lifelines utility co-ordinator supports the Controller during the response phase and the Recovery Manager during the recovery phase.

The Wellington Lifelines Group published a report in 2019 examining the potential effects on Wellington of a magnitude 7.5 earthquake on the Wellington Fault. The report estimated that the country's Gross Domestic Product could take a $16.7b hit. The group called on its 16 member organisations to help deliver 25 key infrastructure projects across the region over the next two decades, at a cost of $5.3b, to help minimise the impact on economic activity in the five years following a major earthquake.

== Lifeline utilities under COVID-19 lockdown ==
A list of Essential Services was published by the New Zealand Government in March 2020 as part of its response to the COVID-19 pandemic in New Zealand.

The definition of essential services includes the Lifeline Utilities listed in Schedule 1 of the Civil Defence and Emergency Management CDEM Act 2002. It also includes any entity that provides maintenance and repair services to those utilities, including supply chains. These essential businesses are allowed to continue to operate during New Zealand's COVID-19 Alert Level 4.

However, the Chief Executive of a company that maintains vegetation close to overhead power lines reported in April that members of the public were abusing their staff for working through the lockdown, despite the fact that this work is deemed an essential service.

== See also ==
- National Emergency Management Agency
- Emergency management
- State of emergency
