= Tomorrow's Schools =

1980s education reforms in New Zealand

"Tomorrow's Schools" is a term based on the white paper Tomorrow's Schools: The Reform of Education Administration in New Zealand, used in reference to changes in New Zealand education in the 1980s. The changes suggested in the white paper, which resulted in a radical restructuring of the country's education system, drew largely on a report by the Picot task force, appointed by the fourth Labour Government of New Zealand. Although the changes became law following the passing of the Education Act 1989, there has been ongoing debate about the role of the state in creating a self-managing model of schools and sustaining it to be equitable in what some said was a quasi-market environment, in the interests of all stakeholders in the education sector. While a formal Government-commissioned review of Tomorrow's Schools in 2018 resulted in policy commitments to address some of the concerns, as of 2026, the model is still in place for state-funded schools in New Zealand.

== Background ==
Against the backdrop of issues raised in the 1970s, New Zealand education underwent major reforms in the 1980s. There was said to be challenges to the consensus of the time that the state was beneficent and efficient by both a "radical left-wing critique that highlighted the continuing inequalities of education" and the emergence of a 'New Right' perspective that questioned "the character and effects of state involvement ". The disputing of whether state mechanisms were "disinterested upholders of the public good" was said to have allowed a "common policy discourse centering on the need for radical structural reforms in education...by an ideologically disparate coalition of interests".

The 1984–1990 Labour government led by David Lange introduced a range of free market, neoliberal economic reforms and some of the briefings and documents at the time indicated this approach was likely to be reflected in the education reforms. In 1987 New Zealand Treasury produced a brief to the Labour government, the second part of which dealt exclusively with education. The paper acknowledged that much of the state system was functioning, but raised concerns that some government interventions into education had resulted in inequitable institutional and financing structures that disadvantaged large numbers of students. For primary school education, government intervention was seen as necessary in the interests of equity of outcomes, equality of opportunity and "values clarification", with attention being drawn to the importance of a strong partnership between families and schools. The document also noted significantly that..."in the technical sense used by economists, education [was] not in fact a 'public good... [is]...never free...[and]...educational services are like other goods traded in the market place".

In April 1987 the Labour government released The Curriculum Review after two years of community consultation and debate. It proposed guidelines for a national curriculum to be "accessible to every student; non-racist and non-sexist; able to ensure significant success for all students; whole; balanced; of the highest quality for every student; planned; co-operatively designed; responsive, inclusive, enabling, enjoyable". While the document was viewed favourably within the education sector, the Treasury said that it did not deal with the relationship between education and the economy or have an approach to manage the issues of consumer choice. Two significant events followed the release of the Review: the establishment of the Government-appointed Taskforce to Review Education Administration (June 1987), and the general election in August 1987, which returned Labour to government, with Prime Minister David Lange taking over the portfolio of Minister for Education. John Codd from Massey University noted: "This ushered in the moment of educational administration reform and the consigning of curriculum reform to the 'backburner'".

== Development and implementation ==
=== Administering for Excellence ===
The chair of the Taskforce established by the Lange-led Government was businessman Brian Picot. Other members were: Associate Professor Peter Ramsay, an educational researcher and critic of "bureaucratic conservatism"; Margaret Rosemergy, a Wellington Teachers' College lecturer and chair of the Onslow College Board of Governors; Whetumarama Wereta from the Department of Māori Affairs, a "social researcher of Ngāi Te Rangi – Ngāti Ranginui descent who had served on the Royal Commission on the Electoral System"; and Colin Wise, a Dunedin businessman with "educational experience as a University of Otago Council member and a past member of a secondary school board of governors".

The Taskforce's final report, Administering for excellence, was released in April 1988. The report identified five main issues of concern in New Zealand's education system: "over-centralisation of decision-making; complexity; lack of information and choice; lack of effective management practices; and feeling of powerlessness among parents, communities and practitioners". The Taskforce recommended the replacement of the Department of Education by a Ministry of Education and the abolition of regional regional education boards. It further suggested that "all schools to become autonomous, self-managing learning institutions, controlled by locally elected boards of trustees, responsible for learning outcomes, budgeting, and the employment of teachers". The report acknowledged the role of biculturalism in education and claimed "that the new structure it recommended would help achieve Māori aspirations".

The Picot report of 1988 was seen by one commentator as a "high-level initiative" that acknowledged and responded to increasingly complex social political issues that had led to criticisms of the education system from a variety of interests. The author concluded that the work of the Picot-led Taskforce to Review Education Administration [was] "an important attempt to restore public confidence in the ability of the state education system to create social equality" in spite of some divergence from the "liberal-progressive assumptions" reflected in the Currie Report of 1962. Another commentator noted that The Curriculum Review was not acknowledged in any way in the Picot report.

=== Tomorrow's Schools ===
In August 1988 the newly re-elected Fourth Labour Government, with Lange as Minister of Education, published Tomorrow's Schools, which accepted most of the recommendations of the Picot report.

The government replaced the Department of Education with new bodies. The Ministry of Education (MoE) was to provide policy advice to the Minister of Education without becoming a direct provider of educational services. Other functions of the MoE included reviewing the curriculum, establishing national guidelines for education, approving charters and managing capital works in schools. The Education Review Office (ERO) was to be an independent review agency that ensured charter goals were achieved, and the boards of trustees were to be responsible for establishing charters as a "contract between the community, the school and the state" with the goal of establishing more autonomy for schools. Other bodies that later came to be recognised included the New Zealand Qualifications Authority (NZQA) and the Tertiary Education Commission. The changes reflected concerns expressed in the Picot report about too much middle management in education, and the new system was said to "enable greater community involvement" because boards of trustees, drawn from the community, would directly administer schools.

Legislation giving effect to the changes came with the passing of the Education Act 1989. Under this Act, regional boards, which had been set up by provincial governments and split into 12 education boards in 1877 (reduced to 10 by 1966), were abolished. Schools became autonomous entities, managed by boards of trustees and as of 2024, this model continues.

== Reception and commentary ==
=== 1990 Implementation Review (The Lough Report) ===
In early 1990, the Government appointed a committee chaired by former Secretary to the Treasury Noel Lough to review the administrative rollout of Tomorrow's Schools. The committee's report, Today's Schools: A review of the education reform implementation process (commonly known as the Lough Report), evaluated how school boards of trustees had handled devolved administrative and financial powers. The review found that the rapid pace of reform had created administrative delays and that many newly elected boards lacked the financial and management experience required for self-governance. To address these issues, the report recommended structured financial devolution, increased training and support for trustees, and clearer distinctions between local board governance and central agency oversight.

=== Government commissioned review, 1996 ===
The New Zealand Government commissioned Reforming Education: The New Zealand Experience, 1984–1996, an independent history of the reforms, in 1996. The authors, Graham and Susan Butterworth, acknowledged that while the changes were radical, they did reflect a debate about the role of the state in providing education. Harvey McQueen, who had been a personal educational advisor to David Lange during the period of these reforms, claimed in a 1999 reflection that the Butterworths had been incorrect in concluding the Picot model had left the New Zealand education system in a "steady state", contending there remained a basic tension at the heart of the reforms as society endeavored "to balance two prospects of freedom: entrepreneurial capitalism, the capacity to maximise profit, and democracy based on concepts of equity and social responsibility". Other reviewers noted that the Butterworths understood their history was largely that of insiders, calling into question their value in assisting external groups who needed to "translate [the policy] into practice in classrooms and other educational settings".

=== Comment from academics ===
A group of New Zealand educationalists wrote a paper in 1999 describing the process that resulted in Tomorrow's Schools as "an interaction between two agendas: one for more equity and the other for more choice...[and]...The Picot Report was released on 10 May 1988 with only 6–7 weeks allowed for public submissions", seen as insufficient time to process over 20,000 submissions that had been received. This paper also contended that there were no clear aims of the reforms and it was difficult to find data – other than that submitted by Treasury in their 1987 brief to the government, which justified the position that the aim of equality had not been met and the system therefore needed reforming. The authors concluded this led to an inference the proposed new system, likely to be market-driven, would improve educational equality, but the debate was clouded by a reluctance of those in favour the reforms to analyse them and those opposed, to criticising perceived underlying ideologies of the government.

In 2000, a senior lecturer in law at Canterbury University claimed that from 1984 the radical restructuring of the New Zealand economy as a result of "following a so-called neoliberal philosophy of economic rationalism...[resulted in a]...market-based model [being] imposed on most public sector activities, including the provision of education, together with a new ethos of managerialism". There was to be little state intervention and education had been positioned as "another commodity in the marketplace".

One school of thought held that the changes were driven by free market ideologies that had been imported into New Zealand following similar reforms in the United Kingdom and Australia and which aligned with the neoliberal reform programmes of the 1984–1990 Labour government. The paper claimed that, driven by the New Zealand Treasury, it was a battle between "New Right agencies" and the principles of "Welfare Labourism" that had originated with the first Labour Government of 1935–1949, "as part of its political commitment to the creation of a just and more equitable society...[with]...education at the centre of its plans for social, political, and economic transformation". This author continued that Treasury was by the 1980s "the ideological agency for the propagation of the principles and concepts of the New Right into areas of social and educational policy...[and their brief to the incoming government in 1987]...demonstrated an unprecedented attempt by Treasury officials to influence the direction and nature of future education policy in New Zealand". Supporting this position, another commentator maintained that New Zealand had an historical commitment to establishing an educational system based on fairness, equality of opportunity and choice, yet the reforms highlighted a paradox between the "apparent commitment to the social goals of both equity and choice in the pursuit of greater efficiencies" that created a dilemma for the government when designing and implementing such radical changes.

=== Impact of Treasury and the State Services Commission ===
Although representatives from the New Zealand Treasury and the State Services Commission (SSC), two agencies that review and assist coordinating government policies, were only invited to participate in the Picot Taskforce from the second meeting and then without voting rights, the impact and influence of both organisations on the reforms of the New Zealand education system has been a source of debate. A paper by two academics maintained that while Treasury had an ongoing interest in education, the SSC had a "far more powerful and direct influence on the education system", a perspective that the authors said was "neglected in the face of the neo-liberal argument". The argument was that while the Treasury saw "responsiveness, choice and competition" as the key elements of educational reform, the brief of the SSC was for more accountability and effectiveness of the state education system, with little overlap between the two positions. In moving in the direction of reforming education by changing the machinery of government, the SSC took a strong position that the problem was one of "producer capture" in the sector and its brief was to advise on how this could be overseen by performance management of staff and other good employer provisions. This became relevant to education with the passing of the State Sector Act 1988, which effectively positioned schools as "government departments headed by CEOs who were to be engaged on 5-year contracts and to take full responsibility for appointments to and the performance, of their department", and the SSC as the de facto collective employer of teachers. This was a situation that was problematic for the authors of this paper because they saw that "the central importance of the SSC's intervention in education...[meant that]...the education reforms...[were]...much more marked by the reform of public administration than they [were] to do with direct changes to education".

Another paper took the view that this changed the position of teachers within the system from being professionals to "just employees of individual schools" but without access to any "policy-making decisions...[in a role]...limited to operational matters". Geoffrey Leane, from the University of Canterbury School of Law, noted that under such a system the "professional context for teachers – including matters of discipline, classification, training and working hours – now lay in the hands of the new managers, the Board of Trustees". According to Leane this could lead to a low-trust model, "arguably at the expense of more subtle qualities (such as commitment, loyalty, sense of public duty, collegiality) that imbued the professional model". The writer concluded that "accountability [was] now a formal, externally imposed thing reflecting low trust in the professional teacher".

=== Local factors ===
There have been other challenges to the theory that the educational reforms of the late 1980s were only a reflection of imported neo-liberal ideology, with one commentary noting that this [ignored] "the cumulative impact of indigenous factors". Some of these factors resulted from challenges to a centralised bureaucracy, with claims from feminist groups that it was a "male-dominated, hierarchical structure". Māori activists said the system was failing Māori students and this led to the National Advisory Committee on Māori Education (NACME) advocating for the creation of a "bicultural society whereby much educational decision-making would be devolved from a largely Pākehā bureaucracy to Māori"...[which because of the rise of Te Kohanga reo]...further highlighted the case for educational reform along the lines of devolution and consumer choice". A paper was published in 2001 that examined how Tomorrow's Schools reforms had affected the development of Kura Kaupapa Māori. The author noted that key principles of the Picot Report were effectively aimed at devolving more decision-making to schools in the interest of meeting community needs, but while this appeared to offer an opportunity for Māori, the philosophy of Picot did not offer "pluralism...[and]...was essentially a mainstream initiative geared to the needs and aspirations of Pakeha and arguably the middle class". The paper contended that while Kura Kaupapa Māori were acknowledged directly in the Tomorrow's Schools document, they were defined as 'special character schools' rather than an initiative reflecting a partnership under the obligations of the Treaty of Waitangi. Pita Sharples framed this as: "Kura Kaupapa Māori does not equate with any of the school types outlined in Tomorrows Schools and accordingly it is not catered for- in the proposed transition of schools in the current reform of education administration." Tuhiwai Smith saw it as "disappointing" that 'whanau' was one of few Māori words in the Tomorrow's School document because Kura Kaupapa Māori were "designed by Māori for Māori...and many of its key elements are situated in a different framework" from other special or mainstream schools. Significantly, in 2014, the Education Review Office (ERO) released a framework for reviewing Kura Kaupapa Māori with a methodology that:

- acknowledge[d] the diversity of Kura Kaupapa Māori;
- recognise[d] culturally specific features;
- value[d] observable behaviour and whānau practice; and
- aim[ed] to empower kura by strengthening their methods of internal evaluation.

The "marketising" of education in New Zealand as a result of the reforms was discussed by several commentators. One said that not only were parents' needs unmet, but they actually felt their children could be at risk in a "climate of intensived competition". A common strand in the discussion has been to challenge the idea that the market is the fairest way of distributing resources and competition ensures the provision of services that are sensitive to the needs of stakeholders as "consumers" in a process claimed to reflect "the neoliberal advocacy of economic efficiency over social need". Further comment noted that because neoliberalism supported individualism, and a belief that "all citizens were motivated mainly by self interest", any interference by the state would threaten individual freedom. The writer continued that after Tomorrow's Schools, education in New Zealand was a commodity that could be brought or sold and which operated in an environment of "market signals" to indicate levels of satisfaction by parents but which could only be truly contestable if all schools had "no zones, no special state protection, and the same level of state funding". Writers in the Journal of Economic Literature however, after reviewing an assessment of the reforms in New Zealand, agreed "that predicted benefits were overstated, that there were both losers and winners, and that educational nirvana did not result...[but]...the main impact was to make schools' problems more transparent, creating discomforting pressures and attempts to undermine this transparency".

Understanding how schools could be marketed in a country like New Zealand, with a history of state control of education, has been explored through the concept of quasi-market. This can be seen as a rationale for managing what one commentator called an "insoluble contradiction" for any state that used neo-liberal policies but wanted compulsory education. The quasi-market model legitimised continued state funding of education while allowing choice and competition. Following the educational reforms in New Zealand in the late 1980s, schools are funded on the basis of student numbers, so within a quasi-market environment, a focus priority of schools became to build and maintain high roll numbers. This led to a variation of funding amongst schools. Those better able to promote themselves were in areas of the country that reflected the culture of middle-class European and wealthy immigrant families, while schools where the population was of a lower socio-economic status had less funding and often a transient student body. It has been claimed therefore, that the main driver of parent choice under a free market, was related to "the class and ethnic nature of the area in which the schools are located".

Two reports in 2009 assessed the impact of Tomorrow's Schools on New Zealand education twenty years after their implementation. Cathy Wylie, Chief Researcher at the New Zealand Council for Educational Research (NZCER), positioned the education system as still coming to terms with the complexities of self-managing schools and looking to develop relationships to build capacity and efficiency through support that focussed more on teaching and learning than administration. Wylie described the beginning of a "coherent" developmental approach to professional development with ongoing evaluation or self-review that could shift schools "from thinking about accountability in terms of compliance...[and more]...in strategic terms of ongoing development - real self-management". Another publication collated essays that considered several issues that needed to be resolved before the goals of Tomorrow's Schools could be realised.

=== Review of Tomorrow's Schools (2018) ===
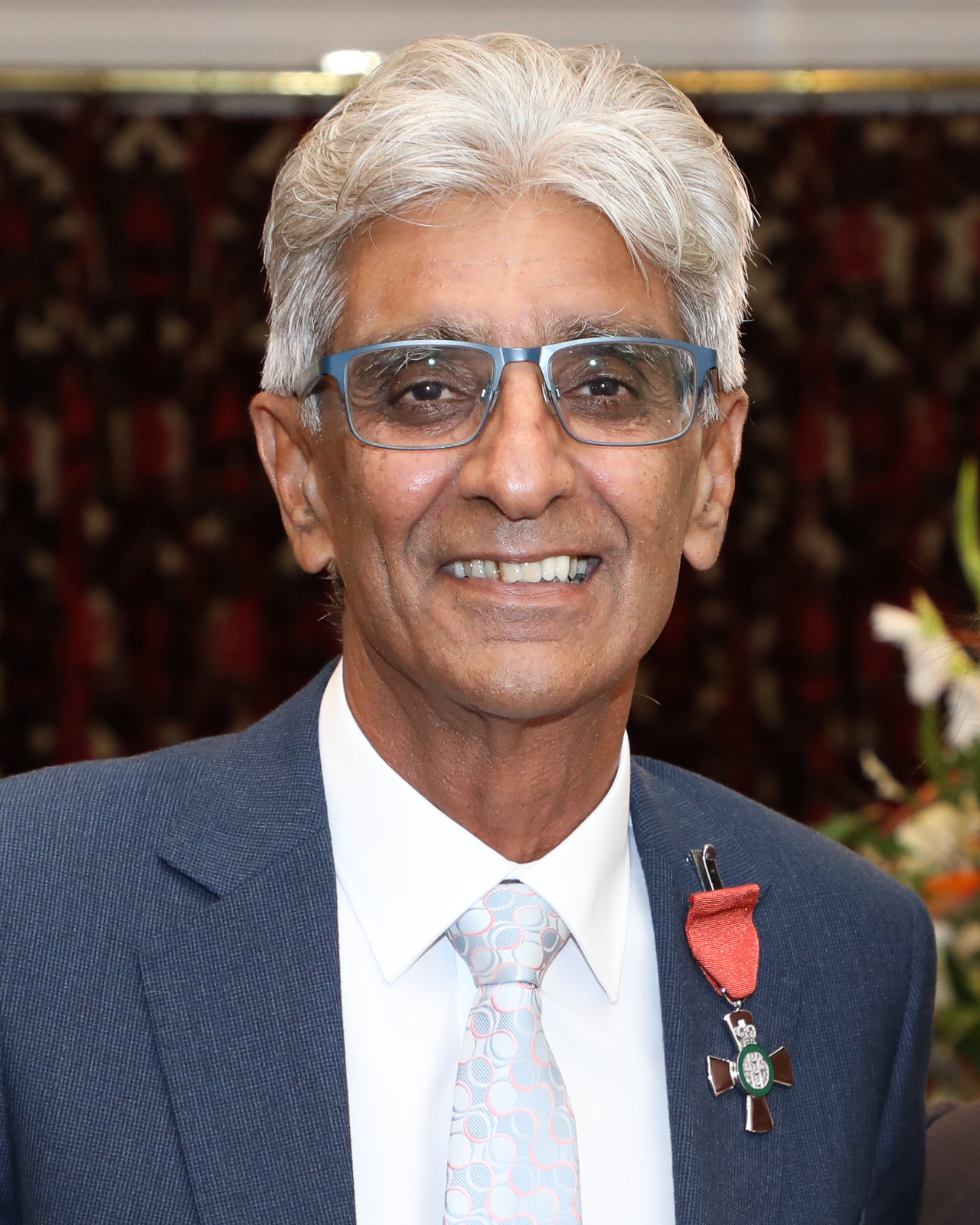
Bali Haque, chair of the Tomorrow's Schools Independent Taskforce

While there were conservative curriculum reforms completed in the 1990s, followed by more comprehensive and contemporary reforms updating what was taught in schools for the 21st century, there were later calls to review the model put in place under Tomorrow's Schools. On 21 February 2018, the media reported that it was likely Chris Hipkins, as part of an "enduring 30 year approach to education", would announce a review of many aspects of the education system, including Tomorrows Schools. When the review was confirmed within the Government's Education Work Programme (EWP), one commentator said that success depended on the initiative reflecting a "genuine partnership model with the Government and the ongoing political tinkering needs to be kept to a minimum". The terms of reference for the review stated, "The primary purpose of the review of Tomorrow's Schools will be to consider if the governance, management and administration of the schooling system is fit for purpose to ensure that every learner achieves educational success", and the independent taskforce was appointed on 3 April 2018 with Bali Haque as chair. Between 24 May and 18 October 2018, the Taskforce engaged with education stakeholders in more than two hundred meetings. A report was released for consultation in December 2018.

There were a range of responses to the document. One media item said there was cautious optimism from schools to the recommendations, while, in another piece, the principal of Albany Senior High School, Auckland said the Report was "as courageous as it is polarising...[and]...seeks to address the very real needs of many of our schools and communities, without causing too much to change for those already winning at the game of life…and at school". The New Zealand Administration and Leadership Society (NZEALS) acknowledged the significance of leadership being highlighted in the Report", and New Zealand Educational Institute (NZEI) noted its own recommendations were for wide public discussion to get consensus, Government transparency, consideration of pilot projects and for the proposed establishment group to remain independent of the Ministry of Education. The response by New Zealand Post Primary Teachers' Association (PPTA) agreed with the timing and relevance of the Report, thanked the Taskforce for its engagement with the community and noted that "secondary teachers will be watching closely to see whether any funding accompanying the proposed changes is used to enhance teaching and learning or whether, as in the case of the 1989 reforms, it is captured by managers, consultants and officials".

The New Zealand Secondary Principals' Council (NZSPC) appreciated the approach taken by the Taskforce and highlighted their support, in particular for the "proposed shift in the balance from totally self-managing schools to a system that gave greater focus on a supportive network of schools", with some questions about the formation and operation of the middle layer of the system described as 'hubs'. There had previously been public debate about the suggestion in the Report for education hubs. Nikki Kaye, National's spokesperson for education at the time, said the concept needed careful consideration to ensure it did not transfer responsibilities from parents to bureaucrats, and a group of schools later launched a campaign urging parent not to support the concept, although much of their case was shown to have been based on misinformation. Interviewed by Kathryn Ryan, two New Zealand principals discussed their differing views on the proposed hubs in terms of whether or not they would improve the running of schools. The Tomorrow's Schools taskforce chair Bali Haque, said the members of hubs would be appointed by the Minister of Education with half being experienced educators and the rest iwi representatives and people with business experience and skills in managing organisational change. Late in 2019, the government rejected the idea of hubs as being "too disruptive", with Chris Hipkins clarifying he thought [a] "lot of schools had interpreted the notion of hubs as taking away their autonomy...[but]...finalised proposals showed the taskforce had found a better way of addressing issues around governance burdens and a lack of support" without schools getting the impression they had been disempowered.

Martin Thrupp and Katrina McChesney from the University of Waikato wrote a four-part series on the report suggesting it could be read to identify issues and concerns that have "broad agreement nation-wide...[to]...establish a shared platform or rationale for change before tackling the more demanding discussions of the needs of different and unequal communities".

An editorial in the New Zealand Journal of Teachers' Work noted the Taskforce had aimed to promote "educational issues rather than the competitive commercial interests promoted by the Treasury in 1988", and while acknowledging there would be public resistance to some of the suggested roles for boards of trustees, concluded that key to the recommendations was the claim of the Taskforce that under the current self-governing school model there had been a significant increase in "unhealthy competition between schools".

In their submission to the review of Tomorrow's Schools, The New Zealand Society of Authors (PEN NZ Inc) suggested that the Ministry of Education reassess the budget allocated to schools to purchase books, and in particular those by New Zealand authors. The case was made that reading local stories was pedagogically sound because "local content draws in less-able readers, and students of all abilities engage more if they see themselves reflected on the page". The submission also stressed the importance of supporting all schools to have a qualified librarian and to address the scientific case that students do not retain as much information from online learning as they do from books.

John Ryan, Controller and Auditor-General of New Zealand, within the mandate of his position not to hold a view on the proposed changes to the education system, wrote to Bali Haque on 5 April 2019 with several questions related to school governance, ensuring accountability, better support for boards, improved reporting on school performance, considering effects on other parts of the education system and ensuring changes are implemented effectively.

The Taskforce's final report was submitted to the Government in July 2019 and released to the public in September 2019. One research paper noted:

The report highlighted the time and effort spent on matters many boards did not have the capacity and capability to address, such as managing school property and appointing the principal. The Taskforce also reported they had found no evidence to suggest the self-governing model had been successful in raising student achievement or improving equity...[and]...made a number of recommendations that, if implemented, would change the relationships between schools and the Ministry of Education.

Ngā Kura o Aotearoa New Zealand Schools (2018), a review of compulsory schools in New Zealand, published in September 2019, noted in the Foreword that "the Government's response to the independent taskforce's report on the review of Tomorrow's Schools" was one of the "staged and sustainable improvements" still to be initiated.

On 12 November 2019, the Government released Supporting all schools to succeed: Reform of the Tomorrow's Schools system, its response to the Taskforce's recommendations. Chris Hipkins explained in the media that the Government would set up a new Education Support Agency, create an "independent disputes panel for parents and students", simplify management of schools' property and establish a new leadership centre. In another press release, he said the Government was aiming for "better targeted and earlier support provided at many different levels, stronger leadership support structures, more collaboration between schools and a reset of the relationship between schools and the Ministry". Kelvin Davis said the responses acknowledged the calls from Māori for "more agency and authority over the education of Māori learners...to see their identity, language and culture in the daily practice of our education system...[within]... learning environments that are physically and emotionally safe".

Two commentators with experience as Advisory Officers for the Post Primary Teachers' Association (PPTA) claimed the Government's response did not address the issue within Tomorrow's Schools that, while the Government set requirements for schools, it did not control how these were to be met. The writers held that this 'policy gap' left individual schools under the influence of local factors and, without incentives to respond to Government policies, enabled some leadership teams to "ignore guidance from the central agencies, such as the Ministry of Education (and occasionally even the law)". The piece concluded that the suggested new support agency and leadership education by the Teaching Council would not stop some schools making mistakes. Two academics from Victoria University said the government's response indicated not all of the changes proposed by the taskforce would be implemented and questioned whether the review had "gone far enough to address the systemic inequalities between New Zealand Schools".

The Education and Training Act (2020) was passed on 1 August 2020, repealing all existing education and training legislation.

On 10 August 2020 as New Zealand managed the COVID-19 pandemic, Chris Hipkins, in his capacity as Minister of Education, provided the Government with COVID-19: Update on the Reforms of Tomorrow's Schools System. The paper noted that the Education and Training Act would implement many of the recommendations of the Taskforce's recommendations and acknowledged that responding to the challenges of COVID-19 had required a collaborative approach from all stakeholders in the education sector that reflected "the intent of the Tomorrow's Schools reforms". It recorded that the workplan included progressing legislation, improving property management, working on dispute resolution, developing a mandatory code of conduct for Boards of Trustees [and] "strengthened links with the profession, including leaders of Māori medium education, to deepen their influence in improving overall system performance".

At the 2020 New Zealand general election the Labour Party won a landslide victory. During the election campaign Labour had presented an education policy that confirmed the proposed establishment of the Education Service Agency to provide support for schools and encourage collaboration rather than competition in the drive for equitable outcomes. In November 2020, the new government confirmed National Education Learning Priorities (NELP) and the Tertiary Education Strategy (TES) which laid out a set of priorities for the education sector that would meet the legal requirements of the Education and Training Act (2020). Supporting all schools to succeed: Reform of the Tomorrow's Schools system had established five objectives to meet the Taskforce's recommendations on the review of Tomorrow's schools: Learners at the centre; Barrier free access; Quality teaching and leadership; future of learning and work; and World class inclusive public education. NELP and TES retained these objectives with actions relevant to the priorities.

In March 2021, the Cabinet of the New Zealand Government approved the Education Work Programme (EWP) 2021, with "Reform of the Tomorrow's Schools system" headlined under Objective 3: Quality teaching and leadership.

The 2022 Budget of the Government proposed $22.3 million over four years to develop the leadership advisor positions as part of the commitment to provide more front line support to schools as part of the response to recommendations of the Tomorrow's Schools Taskforce.

An article in the Victoria University-based journal, Policy Quarterly, in August 2023, suggested that when the government approached the Review from a position of resetting the current system, this was at odds with the recommendation by the Taskforce that there be more of a structural transformation. The author acknowledged that the government had made many changes, but concluded some commentators questioned whether these changes [would be] "able to move the system away from a prevailing neoliberal attitude and towards meaningfully addressing the ongoing challenges faced by the sector".
