= Ministry of Education (New Zealand) =

Government ministry of New Zealand

Coordinates: 41.275615°S 174.778782°E

- Te Tāhuhu o Te Mātauranga (Māori)

Agency overview
- Formed: 1989
- Preceding agency: Department of Education
- Jurisdiction: New Zealand
- Headquarters: 1 The Terrace, Wellington 6011
- Annual budget: Total budgets for 2026/27; Vote Education ▲$52,753,230,000; Vote Tertiary Education ▲$3,837,404,000
- Minister responsible: Hon Erica Stanford, Minister of Education
- Agency executive: Ellen MacGregor-Reid, Acting Chief Executive and Secretary for Education
- Child agencies: New Zealand Qualifications Authority; Tertiary Education Commission; Education New Zealand
- Website: www.education.govt.nz

The Ministry of Education (Māori: Te Tāhuhu o te Mātauranga) is the public service department of New Zealand charged with overseeing the New Zealand education system.

The Ministry was formed in 1989 when the former, all-encompassing Department of Education was broken up into six separate agencies.

== History ==
=== Picot report ===
The Ministry was established as a result of the Picot task force set up by the Labour government in July 1987 to review the New Zealand education system. The members were Brian Picot, a businessman, Peter Ramsay, an associate professor of education at the University of Waikato, Margaret Rosemergy, a senior lecturer at the Wellington College of Education, Whetumarama Wereta, a social researcher at the Department of Maori Affairs and Colin Wise, another businessman. The task force was assisted by staff from the Treasury and the State Services Commission (SSC), who may have applied pressure on the task force to move towards eventually privatising education, as had happened with other government services. The mandate was to review management structures and cost-effectiveness, but did not include curriculum, teaching or effectiveness. In nine months the commission received input from over 700 people or organisations.

The Picot task force released its report Administering for Excellence: Effective Administration in Education in May 1988. The report was critical of the Department of Education, which it labelled as inefficient and unresponsive. The task force conceived of the school charter as a contract between school boards, the local community and central authority and the government accepted many of the recommendations subsequently published in their response – Tomorrow's Schools. This recommended a system where each school would be largely independent, governed by a board consisting mainly of parents, although subject to review and inspection by specialised government agencies. Another recommendation was that boards of trustees were made responsible to the Minister of Education, who gained the power to dismiss boards.

The Picot report became the basis for a drawn out process of educational reform in New Zealand starting in 1989. When National was elected in October 1990, it carried out a further series of educational reviews culminating in the publication Education Policy: Investing in People, Our Greatest Asset. This resulted in further modifications to the structure of education reform, and according to one academic, created "a system which is a far cry from the Picot intentions... There has been an ongoing series of changes and reassessments that has caused chaos, confusion and massive insecurity throughout the education sector".

=== Early 21st century ===
In recent years the Ministry of Education has made extensive changes to curriculum standards for young New Zealanders to improve education quality. The Ministry stated these changes were made to enhance a more holistic and student-centred learning style and approach towards a better future for children.

In 2023, the Government announced a temporary hold on these educational developments as there is a focus from the government to invest more attention to literacy and maths in the New Zealand curriculum.

In April 2024, the Ministry announced that 565 jobs would be cut to meet the National-led coalition government's directive for government departments and agencies to reach budget savings of up to 7.5%.

== Key Legislation ==
=== The Education Act 1989 ===
The changes suggested in the white paper Tomorrow's Schools: The Reform of Education Administration in New Zealand were translated into law and brought into effect by the Education Act 1989. The Act decentralised the administration of education in New Zealand by abolishing the Department of Education and regional Education Boards. Instead, Te Tāhuhu o te Mātauranga: The Ministry of Education was established to serve as the New Zealand Government's lead adviser on education, from early learning, primary and secondary schooling through to tertiary education, led by the Minister/Secretary for Education. Functions that were previously performed by the Department of Education were taken on by newly established regulatory agencies overseen by the reduced-in-scale Ministry of Education, including the Education Review Office, the New Zealand Qualifications Authority, and the Teaching Council: Ngā Tikanga Matatika.

Under this legislation, every State and State-integrated school or kura in Aotearoa New Zealand is governed by a Board of Trustees, which serves as the employer of all staff, including the principal, and sets the overall strategic direction for the school or kura. These boards consist of the school’s principal, a teacher representative, and parents elected by their local community. A student representative is also common on school Boards, elected by their student peers. The principal serves as the Board's 'chief executive', responsible for operating the school in accordance with the Board's direction and policies.

As recommended by the Picot Report, endorsed by the Tomorrow's Schools white paper, and legislated by the Education Act 1989, these reforms were designed to give school Boards real but accountable autonomy within a system that retained certain minimum controls, and balance local responsibility with central prescription and authority. This reform arose from growing critique of the role of the State in education, pressured by a growing "radical left-wing critique that highlighted the continuing inequalities of education" and an "emerging 'New Right' perspective which doubted the character and effects of state involvement". Despite the deep seated divisions between these two positions, there was a strong shared policy discourse regarding the need for radical reforms to the structure of education in Aotearoa New Zealand.

The changes brought into effect by the 1989 Act were designed with the intention of improving administration and educational outcomes through empowering greater self-management within schools, effectively creating a 'free market of education' dependent on results and accountability. Within this environment of competition, schools that failed to prove their worth to parents and caregivers in delivering better results for their students would be expected to lose students and therefore face a reduction in funding, and more successful schools would benefit from the reverse effect.

=== The Education and Training Act 2020 ===
The Education and Training Act 2020 repealed and replaced all major pre-existing education and training legislation, notably the Education Acts 1964 and 1989. Much of its content gives effect to the Government's plans to transform the education system as outlined in Supporting all Schools to Succeed: Reform of the Tomorrow's Schools System, in response to the Kōrero Mātauranga | Education Conversation and the Tomorrow's Schools Taskforce report. The legislation was introduced with the intention of simplifying and streamlining the previous legislative framework for the provision of education in Aotearoa New Zealand, and therefore making it easier to navigate for educators and education organisations. The Act retains large parts of the existing education legislation, but updates language where possible without changing the effect of the laws themselves, moves some prescriptive detail directly into regulations, and moves other detailed provisions into schedules at the end of the Act.

Some key updates to the education legislation framework as introduced by the Education and Training Act 2020 include a greater focus on Te Tiriti o Waitangi, COVID-19 response powers, the introduction of a complaint and dispute resolution process, and clarifications regarding governance and reporting structures.

==== Key updates regarding Te Tiriti o Waitangi and COVID-19. ====
A greater focus on Te Tiriti o Waitangi and the rights and obligations of the education sector in honoring the treaty is threaded throughout the Act. The Ministry of Education can now provide advice to school boards on how to engage within their communities in develop plans, policies and local curriculum reflect local tikanga Māori, mātauranga Māori and te ao Māori. The legislation enables the Ministry of Education to take practical steps in support of te reo Māori capability in the education workforce through initiatives such as Te Ahu o te Reo Māori. The Act also empowers collaboration between Ministers of Education and te Arawhiti: The Office for Māori Crown Relations to specify what education agencies must do to give effect to public service objectives that relate to Te Tiriti o Waitangi, through the issuing of joint statements.

The Education and Training Act 2020 also grants the Ministry of Education a number of powers in response to the COVID-19 pandemic, with these temporary capabilities put into legislation to ensure quicker Ministry response to future national or local emergency periods are declared, or an epidemic notice is enacted. These include permitting the Ministry's Secretary for Education to direct education entities to comply with a requirement: to open or close for attendance or instruction, to operate, control or manage the entity, to provide instruction in any specified ways, such as through distance learning, and to set any restrictions on attendance with regard to health and safety requirements. The Act also enables the Secretary to direct a board to reopen a school that has been closed due to an emergency, when the Secretary considers that the closure is no longer justified.

==== Key updates to the complaint resolution process and governance structures. ====
The Education and Training Act addresses the lack of a free and accessible complaint and dispute resolution process in the previous Ministry of Education structure. Previously, if a domestic primary or secondary school student and their whānau were unhappy with a board decision, they could seek a review by the Ombudsman or a judicial review in the High Court. Such pathways had limited accessibility, with judicial review often intimidating and expensive. The Act enables the establishment of new local complaint and dispute resolution panels to hear serious disputes where these cannot be resolved at the school level. The panels will have mediation, recommendation and decision-making functions, and will hear disputes relating to: rights to education (including enrolment and attendance), stand-downs, suspensions, exclusions and expulsions, learning support, racism and other types of discrimination, physical and emotional safety, and physical restraint on a student by a teacher or other authorised employee.

The Education and Training Act 2020 includes key clarifications regarding governance and reporting structures, for activities such as enrolment schemes, codes of conduct, and information requesting.

The Act transfers responsibility for the development of enrolment schemes from school boards to the Ministry of Education. This change allows the Ministry to manage each enrolment scheme based on the unique needs of regional communities through consultation with each school's board and any other invested parties.

This Act also enables the Minister of Education to enact a mandatory code of conduct for all New Zealand school board members. Prior to the Act, school boards were the only Crown entity governing body for which the individual and collective duties of members were not set out in either Education legislation or the Crown Entities Act 2004.

Regarding the powers of the Education Review Office (ERO), the Act clarifies that the chief review officer is able to request any information they deem reasonably necessary or desirable from a relevant organisation or person, such as an early childhood provider or school, for the purposes of carrying out their functions.

The legislation also includes a number of the provisions with "sunset clauses", meaning that they will expire after a set period of time and new regulations will need to be developed to replace them.

== Responsibilities ==
The Ministry's role is to "shape an education system that delivers equitable and excellent outcomes". It is not an education provider. That role is met by licensed early childhood services, individual elected Boards of state schools, the proprietors of State-integrated schools, registered private schools and tertiary education providers. The Ministry has numerous functions – advising government, providing information to the sector, providing learning resources, administering sector regulation and funding, and providing specialist services. The Ministry works with other education agencies including the Education Review Office, the New Zealand Qualifications Authority, the Tertiary Education Commission, Education New Zealand, and the Teaching Council of Aotearoa New Zealand.

Within the Ministry of Education, it has a sector called Te Mahau created in 2021. The creation of Te Mahau is to provide more services and support for schools and early learning services. It was created after review by Tomorrow Schools that indicated that schools and early services in New Zealand need more accessible and local support. Staff from Te Mahau provide a broad range of services, including leadership, learning support, and teaching resources, while collaborating with teachers from early learning services and schools. Te Mahau is made up of three frontline groups; Te Tai Raro (North), Te Tai Whenua (Central), Te Tai Runga (South).

Although the Ministry's primary purpose is to in ensuring equitable and excellent outcomes, it is also the mechanism through which the Government of the day implements its education policy. When government changes aspects of its policy on education, the Ministry is responsible for implementing those changes. Sometimes the Ministry ends up in the difficult position of trying to implement politically induced changes in education policy to which teachers, parents, and school boards may be opposed. Changes introduced by the National Government in 2008–2012 are an example.

In order for the Ministry and the wider education sector to perform its role effectively, it is dependent on taxpayer funding provided by Government. When government increases funding or requires financial cutbacks, this also impacts on the ability of the Ministry to fulfil its role. In 2013, the Government provided about $12.2 billion to fund education in New Zealand. By 2021, the Education budget was some $16.3 billion.

In April 2024, the ministry proposed making 565 redundancies.

== Scandals, Controversies, and Public Accountability ==
The Ministry of Education has faced several public controversies in recent years, ranging from system failures to legal challenges and transparency issues. These events have drawn significant media coverage, criticism from unions and legal scrutiny.

=== 2024 Job Cuts and Legal Action ===
In April 2024, the Ministry proposed a major staff restructuring that involved cutting approximately 565 full-time positions. This was part of the government's broader initiative to reduce public sector spending by NZ$1.5 billion. The cuts impacted curriculum, learning support, and regional delivery roles.

The Public Service Association (PSA), New Zealand's largest public sector union, filed legal action against the Ministry in the Employment Relations Authority (ERA). The PSA argued that the Ministry breached the collective agreement, failed to properly consult staff and applied inconsistent decision-making in its restructuring process. Employees described the experience as chaotic, with multiple reports of distress, reversed decisions and poor communication. Some staff told media outlets they were "constantly in tears" throughout the process. In July 2024, the ERA ruled in favour of the PSA. The Authority found that the Ministry had failed to meaningfully consult, did not provide sufficient reasoning for its decisions and breached its legal obligations. The ruling ordered the Ministry to halt parts of the restructure and return to proper consultation with the PSA. This was widely regarded as a landmark decision, forcing the Ministry to reassess its approach to workforce changes.

=== Official Information Act Non-Compliance ===
In the same period, the Ministry admitted that it had failed to meet its own transparency standards when responding to an Official Information Act (OIA) request related to the job cuts. It acknowledged that its refusal to release documents which detailed the criteria used for redundancies did not comply with internal or legislative expectations. The incident raised wider concerns about transparency within the Ministry and contributed to public unease about how decisions were being made. Complaints were submitted to the Office of the Ombudsman, and legal commentary highlighted the potential erosion of public trust when government agencies deny access to important operational information.

=== Curriculum Team Appointments and Merit Concerns ===
Concerns also surfaced around the Ministry's internal hiring practices, particularly for curriculum development roles. In July 2024, a Ministry staff member told RNZ that new curriculum teams were being appointed without transparent merit-based recruitment. The employee alleged that appointments appeared politically influenced and lacked clarity on selection processes.

Although the Ministry denied any political interference, it acknowledged that the restructuring process may have caused confusion around how some roles were filled. These claims further fuelled debate around curriculum reform, which was already controversial due to shifts in literacy and numeracy priorities under the new government.

=== Public and Sector Response ===
These controversies triggered a broader discussion about governance and public accountability in the education sector. Education stakeholders including principals' associations and sector unions criticised the pace of change, the lack of staff engagement, and the potential damage to long-term education outcomes.

Public commentary, including editorials and legal analysis, called for greater oversight of change management processes and more robust protections for staff during restructuring. The Ministry's credibility and effectiveness were brought into question, particularly its ability to lead reform while maintaining trust and professional standards.

While the Ministry maintains its commitment to equity and excellence in education, critics argue that its recent actions have undermined those goals. Rebuilding confidence with staff and the wider public is now seen as a key challenge for the organisation, especially in a time of political pressure, fiscal restraint, and workforce fatigue.

=== School Lunches Programme ===
In 2019, a pilot programme of the New Zealand School Lunch program, also known as Ka Ora Ka Ako – Healthy School Lunches began. It was established in response to child poverty concerns and growing recognition of food insecurity among tamariki (children). The program aims to provide education outcomes by ensuring children have access to healthy meals, and reducing hunger-related barriers to learning.

Background and Legislation

The program was introduced by the then Labour-led coalition government (2017-2023), with Prime Minister Jacinda Ardern championing policies to address child poverty as Minister for Child Poverty. The initiative aligns with the Child Poverty Reduction Act 2018, which set legally binding targets to reduce child poverty rates.

Pilot and Expansion

The original two-year pilot functioned on an allocated 21.6million dollars which served lunches in 31 schools. Following its success, it was expanded in 2020, with an additional 220-million-dollar investment which extended its coverage to 200,000 students across 1,000 schools by 2023.

The programme is overseen by the Minister of Education and is made in partnership with the Ministry of Health, as well as local food providers. Schools can opt between on-site meal preparation or pre-packaged lunches which are then delivered by an external catering company.

The program has received both praise and criticism. Supporters argue that it reduces food insecurity for disadvantaged children, improves concentration, attendance in schools, and supports local food suppliers. Schools have reported better student engagement, and reduced stigma around food poverty. However, there have been raised concerns around food waste, logistical challenges, and quality control.

Controversies

1. Food Waste Concerns

Some schools reported large amounts of uneaten food being discarded, raising questions about portion sizes and student preferences. In response, the Ministry of Education introduced waste reduction strategies, including student feedback systems and flexible menu options.

2. Quality and Nutritional Standards

There have been complaints about bland or unappealing meals, with some parents and students criticising pre-packaged lunches for being processed or lacking freshness.

3. Funding and Sustainability

The program's cost has been a point of debate. In 2023, the National Party (then in opposition) questioned whether the program was financially sustainable, suggesting funds could be better targeted. However, the Labour government defended it as a necessary investment in child well-being.

4. Supplier Issues

Some caterers faced delivery problems, leading to late or missed meals. In 2021, the Post reported that a Taranaki school received mouldy sandwiches.

Changes Under the National-Led Coalition Government

The program became a political issue during the 2023 general election, with National and ACT proposing modifications, including means-testing or reducing coverage.

Following the 2023 New Zealand general election, the newly formed National-led coalition government, in partnership with ACT and NZ First, initiated a review of the Ka Ora, Ka Ako school lunch program, citing concerns over cost efficiency and value for money. In early 2024, the government announced several key changes aimed at reducing expenditure while maintaining support for students most in need.

1. Targeted Eligibility and Reduced Coverage

One of the most significant changes was the introduction of more stringent eligibility criteria, shifting from a universal approach in low-decile schools to a more targeted model. The government argued that some schools receiving funding had lower levels of food insecurity than others, leading to unnecessary spending. Under the new rules, schools must demonstrate a clear need based on student hardship data, potentially excluding some previously covered institutions.

2. Cost Reduction Measures

The coalition government identified food waste and high catering costs as major inefficiencies. To address this, they implemented: Smaller portion options to reduce waste, Simplified menus focusing on cost-effective, nutritious staples, Competitive tendering for providers, encouraging lower-cost bids. These changes aimed to cut program costs by up to 15%, saving an estimated NZ$30 million annually without completely removing access.

3. Changes to Providers and Quality Control

Some regional providers were consolidated or replaced following complaints about meal quality and reliability. The government introduced stricter performance clauses in contracts, requiring caterers to meet higher nutritional and delivery standards. Schools were also given more flexibility to opt for in-house cooking where feasible, reducing reliance on external suppliers.

4. Political and Public Reaction

While supporters of the changes argued they would make the program more sustainable, critics, including Labour and advocacy groups, warned that reduced coverage could leave some vulnerable students without reliable meals. Some principals reported initial confusion during the transition, but the government pledged to monitor impacts and adjust if needed.

== Ministers ==
Education ministers
Year	Officeholder	Portfolio(s) and responsibilities	Other portfolios and responsibilities outside of education
2023-present	Hon Erica Stanford	Minister of Education	Minister of Immigration Lead Coordination Minister for the Government’s Response to the Royal Commission’s Report into Historical Abuse in State Care and in the Care of Faith-Based Institutions
2023-present	Hon Penny Simmonds	Minister for Tertiary Education and Skills	Associate Minister for Social Development and Employment
2023-present	Hon David Seymour	Associate Minister of Education (Partnership Schools)	Minister for Regulation Associate Minister of Finance Associate Minister of Justice (Treaty Principles Bill) Associate Minister of Health (Pharmac)

Year	Officeholder	Portfolio(s) and responsibilities	Other portfolios and responsibilities outside of education
2020-2023	Hon Chris Hipkins	Minister of Education	Minister for COVID-19 Response Minister for the Public Service Leader of the House
2023-2023	Hon Jan Tinetti	Minister of Education	
2020-2023	Hon Aupito William Sio	Associate Minister of Education (Pacific Peoples)	Minister for Courts Minister for Pacific Peoples Associate Minister for Foreign Affairs Associate Minister of Health (Pacific Peoples) Associate Minister of Justice
2020-2023	Hon Jan Tinetti	Associate Minister of Education	Minister for Internal Affairs Minister for Women
2020-2023	Hon Kelvin Davis	Associate Minister of Education (Maori Education)	Minister for Maori Crown Relations: Te Arawhiti Minister for Children Minister for Corrections

Year	Officeholder	Portfolio(s) and responsibilities	Other portfolios and responsibilities outside of education
2017-2020	Hon Chris Hipkins	Minister of Education	Minister of State Services Minister Responsible for Ministerial Services Leader of the House
2017-2020	Hon Tracey Martin	Associate Minister of Education	Minister for Children Minister of Internal Affairs Minister for Seniors
2017-2020	Hon Jenny Salesa	Associate Minister of Education	Minister for Building and Construction Minister for Ethnic Communities Associate Minister of Health Associate Minister of Housing and Urban Development
2017-2020	Hon Kelvin Davis	Associate Minister of Education (Maori Education)	Minister for Crown/Māori Relations Minister of Corrections Minister of Tourism

Year	Officeholder	Portfolio(s) and responsibilities	Other portfolios and responsibilities outside of education
2014-2017	Hon Hekia Parata	Minister of Education	
2014-2017	Hon Steven Joyce	Minister for Tertiary Education, Skills and Employment	Minister for Economic Development Minister for Regulatory Reform Minister for Science and Innovation Minister Responsible for Novopay Associate Minister of Finance
2014-2017	Hon Nikki Kaye	Associate Minister of Education	Minister for ACC Minister of Civil Defence Minister for Youth
2017-2017	Hon Nikki Kaye	Minister of Education	Minister for ACC
2014-2017	Louise Upston	Associate Minister for Tertiary Education, Skills and Employment	Minister for Land Information Minister for Women Associate Minister of Local Government
2014-2017	David Seymour	Parliamentary Under-Secretary to the Minister of Education	Parliamentary Under-Secretary to the Minister for Regulatory Reform

Year	Officeholder	Portfolio(s) and responsibilities	Other portfolios and responsibilities outside of education
2011-2014	Hon Hekia Parata	Minister of Education	Minister for Pacific Island Affairs
2011-2014	Hon Steven Joyce	Minister for Tertiary Education, Skills and Employment	Minister for Economic Development Minister for Science and Innovation Associate Minister of Finance
2011-2014	Hon Craig Foss	Associate Minister of Education	Minister of Commerce Minister of Broadcasting Associate Minister for ACC
2011-2014	Hon Tariana Turia	Associate Minister for Tertiary Education, Skills and Employment	Minister for Whanau Ora Minister for Disability Issues Associate Minister of Health Associate Minister of Housing Associate Minister for Social Development
2011-2014	Hon John Banks	Associate Minister of Education	Minister for Regulatory Reform Minister for Small Business Associate Minister of Commerce
2011-2014	Hon Dr Pita Sharples	Associate Minister of Education	Minister of Maori Affairs Associate Minister of Corrections

Year	Officeholder	Portfolio(s) and responsibilities	Other portfolios and responsibilities outside of education
2008-2011	Anne Trolley	Minister of Education Minister for Tertiary Education Minister Responsible for the Education Review Office	
2008-2011	Dr Wayne Mapp	Associate Minister for Tertiary Education	Minister of Defence Minister of Research, Science and Technology Associate Minister for Economic Development
2008-2011	Heather Roy	Associate Minister of Education	Minister for Consumer Affairs Associate Minister of Defence
2008-2011	Dr Pita Sharples	Associate Minister of Education	Minister for Maori Affairs Associate Minister for Corrections

Year	Officeholder	Portfolio(s) and responsibilities	Other portfolios and responsibilities outside of education
2005-2007	Hon Steven Maharey	Minister of Education Minister Responsible for the Education Review Office	Minister of Broadcasting Minister of Research, Science and Technology Minister for Crown Research Institutions
2007-2008	Hon Chris Carter	Minister of Education	Minister of Conservation Minister of Housing
2005-2008	Hon Dr Michael Cullen	Minister for Tertiary Education	Deputy Prime Minister Minister of Finance Leader of the House
2005-2008	Hon Jim Anderton	Associate Minister for Tertiary Education	Minister of Agriculture Minister for Biosecurity Minister of Fisheries Minister of Forestry Minister Responsible for the Public Trust Associate Minister of Health
2005-2008	Hon Parekura Horomia	Associate Minister of Education	Minister for Māori Affairs Associate Minister for Social Development and Employment Associate Minister of State Services Associate Minister of Fisheries

Year	Officeholder	Portfolio(s) and responsibilities	Other portfolios and responsibilities outside of education
2002-2005	Hon Trevor Mallard	Minister of Education (Tertiary, International and ECE)	Minister for State Services Minister of Energy Minister for Sport and Recreation Coordinating Minister, Race Relations Associate Minister of Finance
2002-2005	Hon Parekura Horomia	Associate Minister of Education	Minister of Māori Affairs Associate Minister for Social Development and Employment Associate Minister of State Services Associate Minister of Fisheries Associate Minister of Youth Affairs
2002-2005	Hon David Benson-Pope	Associate Minister of Education, with responsibility for compulsory sector and special education	Minister of Fisheries Associate Minister for the Environment Associate Minister of Justice
2002-2005	Mahara Okeroa	Parliamentary Under-Secretary to the Minister of Education	Parliamentary Under-Secretary to the Minister of Māori Affairs Parliamentary Under-Secretary to the Minister of Conservation

Year	Officeholder	Portfolio(s) and responsibilities	Other portfolios and responsibilities outside of education
1999-2002	Trevor Mallard	Minister of Education	Minister of State Services Minister for Sport, Fitness and Leisure Associate Minister of Finance
1999-2002	Steve Maharey	Associate Minister of Education (Tertiary Education)	Minister of Social Services and Employment Associate Minister of Community and Voluntary Sector
1999-2002	Lianne Dalziel	Associate Minister of Education	Minister of Immigration Minister for Senior Citizens

Year	Officeholder	Portfolio(s) and responsibilities	Other portfolios and responsibilities outside of education
1996-1999	Hon Wyatt Creech	Minister of Education	Leader of the House
1999-1999	Hon Dr Nick Smith	Minister of Education	Minister of Conservation
1996-1999	Hon Dr Nick Smith	Associate Minister of Education	Minister of Conservation Associate Minister of Social Welfare
1996-1999	Hon Brian Donnelly	Associate Minister of Education	

== See also ==
- Education in New Zealand
- History of education in New Zealand

== Bibliography ==
- Fiske, Edward B.; Ladd, Helen F. (2000). When schools compete: a cautionary tale. Brookings Institution Press. p. 48ff. ISBN 0-8157-2835-2.
- Levin, Benjamin (2001). Reforming education: from origins to outcomes. Routledge. p. 44. ISBN 0-7507-0981-2.
