= Picot task force =

Task force for educational reform in New Zealand

The Picot task force was set up by the New Zealand government in July 1987 to review the school system. The mandate was to review management structures and cost-effectiveness, but did not include curriculum, teaching or effectiveness.

The Government largely accepted the recommendations, with legislation giving effect to a new era in education coming into force on 1 October 1989.

== Membership ==
The members of the task force were: Brian Picot, a businessman, Peter Ramsay, an associate professor of education at the University of Waikato, Margaret Rosemergy, a senior lecturer at the Wellington College of Education, Whetumarama Wereta, a social researcher at the Department of Maori Affairs and Colin Wise, another businessman. Picot had a high profile in the retail industry, having served as a director of several major New Zealand companies. He was also involved in public service, being president of the Auckland Chamber of Commerce in 1975 and Pro-Vice Chancellor of Auckland University in the 1990s, and in 2001 was "inducted into the Fairfax Business Hall of Fame in 2001 and made a distinguished fellow of the Institute of Directors in 2007".

== Review process ==
The task force was assisted by staff from the Treasury and the State Services Commission (SSC), who may have applied pressure on the task force to move towards eventually privatizing education, as had happened with other government services. Other organisations initially invited to meet with the Taskforce were the New Zealand Māori Council, the Kohanga Reo Trust and the Māori Women's Welfare League, while the teachers' union was excluded because of concerns from some organisations about possible "provider-capture".

The mandate was to review management structures and cost-effectiveness, but did not include curriculum, teaching or effectiveness. In nine months the commission received input from over 700 people or organizations. By the time of the Taskforce's first meeting on 31 July 1987, the members had viewed relevant briefs, key policy documents, recommendations and student achievement data, specifically 1986 data that showed poor exit qualifications of Māori students. It is recorded that at this initial meeting, there was agreement the proposed report was to be more than a discussion document and expected to be acted upon quickly by the government, and it would be necessary to radically change an education system identified as "too complex and too unresponsive".

== Administering for Excellence ==
The Picot task force released its report Administering for Excellence: Effective Administration in Education in May 1988. The report was critical of the Department of Education, which it labelled as inefficient and unresponsive. It recommended a system where each school would be largely independent, governed by a board consisting mainly of parents, although subject to review and inspection by specialized government agencies.

The government accepted many of the recommendations in their response Tomorrow's Schools - which became the basis for educational reform in New Zealand starting in 1989.

However, not all recommendations survived. The concept of a coordinating Education Policy Council was dropped. The Picot task force conceived of the school charter as a contract between school boards, the local community and central authority. After a review by the SSC, the boards of trustees were made responsible to the Minister of Education, who gained the power to dismiss boards.

The recommendation of the task force to provide funding to the boards for payment of salaries, rather than have teachers paid by the government, was rejected at first. Later reintroduced on a voluntary trial basis, the concept of paying salaries out of block grants was rejected by most boards.

== See also ==
- Education in New Zealand
- History of education in New Zealand
- Tomorrow's Schools
