= Environmental education in New Zealand =

Ecological sustainability is part of the values in the Ministry of Education curriculum.

== History ==
The 2009 Government Budget removed funding for Education for Sustainability, effective from December.

By 2018, 1,161 schools used Enviroschools, founded by the Te Mauri Tau organisation in the late 1990s, with funding from the Ministry for the Environment and regional councils. Enviroschools take part in activities such as tree planting, recycling and sustainable transport.

== See also ==
- Education in New Zealand
- Environment of New Zealand
- Conservation in New Zealand
