= Whetu =

Whetu is a given name and a short form of longer names (hypocorism). It may refer to:

== Given name ==
- Whetu Henry, New Zealand rugby league footballer in the 1970s
- Whetu Taewa (born 1970), New Zealand former rugby league footballer

== Hypocorism ==
- Whetu Douglas (born 1991), New Zealand rugby union player
- Whetu Tirikatene-Sullivan (1932–2011), New Zealand politician
- Whetumarama Wereta, Māori political scientist and statistician from New Zealand
