= Local Government Commission (New Zealand) =

Independent statutory body in New Zealand

The Local Government Commission is an independent statutory body established under the Local Government Act 2002 in New Zealand.

The Commission has three members who are appointed by the Minister of Local Government. Its main task is to make decisions on the structure of local government and on electoral arrangements for local authorities.

== Members ==
Members since 1990:

Name	Start	End	Role
Sir Brian Elwood	1 April 1985	1 November 1992	Chair
Whetu Wereta	1 April 1990	31 March 1993	
Doug Pearson	1 April 1990	31 May 1996	
Ian Lawrence	1 April 1993		Chair
Barbara Durbin	1 April 1995	31 March 2001	
Robin Wilkins	1 April 1996	31 March 1998	
Sir Ross Jansen	8 September 1998	31 March 2001	Chair
Bruce Anderson	1 April 1998	31 March 2001	
Grant Kirby	June 2001	8 July 2005	Chair
Linda Constable	June 2001	30 May 2005	
Kerry Marshall	June 2001	30 May 2005	
Sue Piper	8 July 2005		Chair
Gwen Bull	1 June 2005	May 2009	
Wynne Raymond	8 July 2005		
Colin Dale	2007		Temporary commissioner
Grant Kirby (second period)	May 2009	1 July 2014	
Basil Morrison	July 2011	31 July 2015	Chair
Anne Carter	July 2011	31 July 2015	
Janie Annear	1 July 2014		
Wira Gardiner	1 August 2015	21 September 2018	Chair
Leigh Auton	1 August 2015		
Brendan Duffy	March 2017	December 2025	Chair
Pita Paraone	7 November 2018	26 August 2019	Chair
Bonita Bigham	June 2021	present	
Sue Bidrose	15 July 2022	present	Chair
Andrew Turner	December 2025	present	

== See also ==
- Territorial authorities of New Zealand
- Local Government New Zealand
