= Jack Lewin =

New Zealand public servant, unionist and lawyer (1915–1990)

John Philip Lewin (3 June 1915 – 4 May 1990) was a New Zealand public servant, unionist and lawyer.

== Biography ==
=== Early life and career ===
Lewin was born in Masterton, New Zealand, on 3 June 1915. His family experienced hardships after his father was prematurely retired from his job at the Railway Department after organising employees against salary reductions.

He was educated at Palmerston North Boys' High School before leaving school to briefly work in commerce and journalism before beginning a career in the civil service. In 1934 he gained employment at the Census and Statistics Office at Wellington before later working in the State Fire Insurance Office at Palmerston North, the head office of the Department of Labour, and in 1943 as an inaugural employee at the new Rehabilitation Board. In 1944 he became a research and publicity officer at the National Service Department. He worked for Walter Nash, the Minister of Finance, first as research officer then later as a personal private secretary. He was a member of an informal think tank which advised Nash and travelled with him to several major post-war international conferences concerned with reconstruction, (such as the Bretton Woods Conference and the initial 1948 General Agreement on Tariffs and Trade). He studied part-time at Victoria University, and graduated with a Bachelor of Arts in 1941 and Master of Arts in economics in 1943. He then studied law part-time as well attaining a Bachelor of Law in 1956.

He joined the Public Service Association (PSA) a trade union for civil servants. In the early 1940s Lewin was part of a group of younger PSA members, who became known as the Korero, who began challenging the PSA leadership's deferential approach to the government and the public service commissioner. In 1942 he was elected to the PSA executive before being elevated to the vice presidency three years later. Lewin was then elected president of the PSA in 1946. Bill Sutch (another outspoken leftist public servant) said Lewin was an able, brash, determined and aggressive left winger who was "difficult to intimidate or subdue".

=== The 'satchel snatch' scandal ===
Lewin was closely involved in an arduous union dispute in the late 1940s which led to the infamous 'satchel snatch' scandal. At the time public service employees had fallen, behind private sector counterparts in salaries and wages. He led the PSA in fighting a vigorous campaign to catch up, listing demands for increases would have cost some £2 million according to government estimates in 1948. Fintan Patrick Walsh, who was a member of the Stabilization Commission, also warned that if the public servants maximum demand were accepted an Arbitration Court award would follow giving increases to all salary and wage earners, at a cost of some £45 million. He also cautioned the government that if the PSA won it would increase Lewin's prestige and embolden him to make further demands in the future. Ministers agreed with Walsh, finding Lewin's aggressive tactics and blunt manner of speaking offensive. At one meeting he told ministers that if their demands were refused they would 'make war on the government, and that the object of war was the destruction of the enemy'. To which Nash and Bob Semple both found it insulting.

The public servants became increasingly agitated and threatened to hold a stop-work meeting. Dick Campbell, Chairman of the Public Service Commission, warned employees that anyone attending a stop-work meeting was liable to be dismissed. Cecil Holmes, a communist working in the National Film Studios, then called a stop-work meeting and wrote an impudent letter to Lewin on how to address it, beginning with the advice to "Butter the buggers up a bit..." which Lewin apparently contemplated attending (he even wrote draft resolutions for the occasion). However, better judgement prevailed and the meeting was cancelled after which Lewin returned Holmes's letter.

Shortly afterwards another civil servant (but not a policeman) took a satchel from inside Holmes' car. It contained the letter, Lewin's notes and Holmes's Communist Party membership card which were handed to the police. The police showed them to Nash, the acting Prime Minister and acting Minister of Police. Walsh also saw them and had the idea of using the situation to demonstrate, untruly, that the public service agitation was communist inspired. Nash was pressed to make a public statement on the matter by Walsh and probably some of the other ministers. Nash was reluctant as he knew Lewin quite well. Moreover, he knew Lewin's mother was dying so delayed action for two weeks until after her funeral. Then, after seeking legal advice, he issued a public statement about Communist efforts to use industrial disputes for their own disruptive purposes and at the same time published Holmes' letter and Lewin's notes as evidence.

Walsh wrote to the Prime Minister Peter Fraser that Lewin and his 'clique' had been exposed and that both Holmes and Lewin should be suspended. Holmes was duly sacked and the Public Service Commission recommended that Lewin likewise be dismissed but this was overruled by Fraser and he was reprimanded instead. Holmes went to court over his sacking and won. The Supreme Court held his dismissal was unjust as he should have had a hearing before he was fired. Campbell then wanted to reinstate him to settle the matter but the government went to the Court of Appeal which held, by a majority, that Holmes was not a probationer and hence could not be dismissed summarily.

Nash's public statement and publicizing the correspondence was seen a smear of Lewin. Holmes certainly had acted aggressively, but the planned meeting had been stopped by Lewin and others, so he had merely sought to hold one. The National Party raised the matter in parliament. Sidney Holland moved a motion of no confidence in the government and talked of conditions akin to a police state. He also claimed a breach of the United Nations Charter on Human Rights and that an invasion of personal privacy had occurred with the publication of private papers that had been stolen. The government swore that when the police brought the papers to Nash they did not disclose their source, so that he did not know they were stolen, to which National MPs were induced to laughter.

=== Later career ===
Lewin later became assistant secretary of Industries and Commerce. In 1960 the government announced a scheme to sell cheap power, made from a huge hydro-electric project at Lakes Manapouri and Te Anau, to Comalco New Zealand's aluminium smelter at Bluff to which he warned the government that it was giving away too much by agreeing to sell the power at such low prices.

Lewin was appointed Government Statistician in 1969, and spearheaded the advent of computerisation to the Department of Statistics. In 1973 he left the Department of Statistics to head the Department of Trade and Industry until his retirement the following year.

A lifelong supporter of the Labour Party, Lewin was selected to represent the opposition on the electoral Representation Commission in 1982–83.

=== Death ===
He died on 4 May 1990 at Wellington.

== Personal life ==
On 22 May 1954 Lewin married June Doreece Joblin at Wellington with whom he had a son and a daughter.

Trade union offices
| Preceded by Jack Hunn | President of the Public Service Association; 1946–1951 | Succeeded by John Henry Tuohy |
Government offices
| Preceded by John V.T. Baker | Government Statistician; 1969–1973 | Succeeded by Ernie Harris |
