= History of education in New Zealand =

The development of state schooling in New Zealand has been shaped by social, economic and political interactions between Māori as tangata whenua, missionaries, settlers, voluntary organisations and the state of New Zealand which assumed a full legislative role in education in 1852. While the initiatives and systems were driven by colonial ambitions to protect and civilise the indigenous people through assimilation, and install a model of education based on European concepts of the purposes and delivery of learning, Māori actively engaged with the process to retain their traditional knowledge and language by participating in missions schools, contesting many aspects of Native schools and establishing Kura Kaupapa Māori. Arguably to create and reform an education system that aimed to reduce inequalities and enable social mobility, a series of acts of parliament has attempted to resolve differences between competing interests as the country faced social, cultural and economic challenges. In response to criticism of the education system and the role of the state in managing and delivering equitable learning, there were radical reforms in the late 1980s. These changes resulted in the establishment of self-managing schools and a decentralisation of the system, with the Department of Education being replaced by the Ministry of Education whose role has been to implement government reforms. While these systems are under review, they remain in place as of 2024.

== Origins of primary schools ==
=== Traditional Māori education system ===
Before the arrival of Europeans in New Zealand, Māori had a system of knowledge sharing and application that was learned from elders. This ensured that there were enough people with the skills to fish, hunt, maintain communities and develop crafts such as weaving and basketry. Specific skills such as those for wood carving were taught by experts and tribal law was passed on in whare wananga or houses of learning. In Māori society at the time, understanding, respecting and appropriately applying the restrictions around tapu was seen as an essential aspect of education. Waiata, whakataukī (proverbs), pūrākau (stories) and whakapapa (genealogy) transmitted "history, values and models of behaviour." This educational system has been described as "sophisticated and functional...[with a]...strong knowledge base, and a dynamic ability to respond to changing needs and new challenges".

=== Mission schools ===
The case has been made that when Māori first made contact with a Western European education system, the relationship was characterised by tension as different world views, and at times, contradictory ways of teaching and learning needed to be negotiated. The first school along European lines for Māori in New Zealand was established in 1816 by the missionary Thomas Kendall of the Anglican Church Missionary Society, at Rangihoua, in the Bay of Islands. The school had 33 students when it opened and the roll peaked at 70 within a year. The curriculum was described as "mainly rote learning of the alphabet and syllables, missionary-constructed Māori grammar, and catechisms". Due to issues with attendance and food supplies, the original school closed in 1818 but resumed a year later at Kerikeri. While the missionaries saw literacy as the way to teach the scriptures, Māori were said to have become "increasingly interested in learning to read and write...[and]... understanding the new European world with its tall sailing ships, firearms and iron tools".

== Early state legislation ==
=== Constitution Act 1852 ===
This divided New Zealand into provinces and provincial councils were given responsibility for education, with some financing denominational schools rather than establishing public schools. The six provinces, Auckland, New Plymouth, Wellington, Nelson, Canterbury and Otago determined funding for curriculum and enrolment matters. It has been said that provincial councils managed education differently because each had challenges in "developing a regional infrastructure to support settlement".

=== Education Ordinance 1847 ===
In 1847, the governor of New Zealand, George Grey, took steps to support the existing network of mission schools through the Educational Ordinance 1847. This outlined the principles for education in New Zealand, including provision for government inspection and a requirement that "English language would become an integral part of the New Zealand education system for all, including Māori whose first language was Māori". It has been said that the intention of this was to assimilate Māori based on the prevailing belief at the time of the superiority of British civilisation with education seen as a means of "pacifying Māori...[and in]...providing a potential labouring class to help build the young colony". Another researcher described The Education Ordinance Act [as] a "way of disguising a policy, with aims of social control, assimilation and a means to further establish British rule in New Zealand...[and]...the first of several policies which would serve to see the Māori language being pushed out of schools in favour of English".

=== Native Schools Act 1858 ===
This Act enabled income for the mission schools while stipulating that Māori students must attend as boarders. Numbers of Maori attending these schools were not high by 1850, and because the government struggled to find the funds, most of the mission schools were closed in the 1860s. In the 1850s about 25% of Pākehā could not read or write, and another 14% could only read. Some schools were set up by religious groups, and others by provincial governments. Nelson and Otago had more efficient and better funded education systems than northern provinces such as Auckland. However the Auckland Board of Education was set up 1857 under the Education Act of that year, and had 45 schools by 1863. The first Normal School, which incorporated teacher training, was Moray Place School in Dunedin, which opened in January 1976. The Christchurch Normal School opened in April of the same year.

=== Native Schools Act 1867 ===
Under this Act, a system of secular village primary schools, controlled by the Department of Native Affairs was established. Māori communities could request a school for their children and contribute land and pay toward building costs and teachers' salaries. In spite of this cost, many Māori communities saw the value of learning English and there were 57 Native schools in the country by 1879. In establishing secular, state-controlled schools, The Act took responsibility for Māori schooling away from the missionaries. To some, the lawmakers were seen as having good intentions to "civilise" Māori and teach them "Pākehā ways and knowledge", and the process could be seen as supporting Māori in "developing and rebuilding their language, beliefs and values and creating the initiatives to do that". Paul Moon said the Act was an "assimilationist measure" by the government in response to pressure from missionaries to replace te reo Māori in schools with English. Another researcher noted that "readings of the Māori Schools Bill in 1867 had received much debate in parliament but received acceptance as it appeared that some politicians had genuine concern for Māori interests, but the bill was accepted for purely economic reasons and as a further means of social control". Historian Alan Ward said that while the Act continued the "ideas of racial and cultural superiority", there was an element of altruism in it being an attempt by the government to "develop a system of integrated, rather than segregated schooling based on race".

=== Native Schools Code 1880 ===
In 1879, Native schools came under control of the newly created Department of Education, rather than the Native Department, and effectively operated within a system separate from public schools. The Department of Education was briefed with focussing on curriculum issues and teaching quality, with the goal of assimilating Māori into a state education system that to some extent reflected an 1879 report to the Minister of Education which explicitly stated that te Reo Māori "ought to be very little, if at all", used in any schools. This along with concerns about the quality of teaching, led to the establishment of the Native Schools Code in 1880 by James Pope, the organising inspector of schools. Pope's vision for the future of Māori education in the country was for the establishment of state schools, requiring Maori communities to contribute land and money toward their maintenance. A curriculum was established that consisted of reading, writing, arithmetic, geography, but with a strong focus on the importance of English and publications that were disseminated [and] "designed to set expectations in the Native Schools and their surrounding Māori communities as to what the cultural, literary and social ideals were to which Māori should aspire". Teachers were expected to be "role models for the entire Māori community, therefore linking with the assimilation policy".

=== Education Act 1877 ===
In 1876 the provinces were abolished, resulting in a move toward a "centralist education system", and the passing of the Education Act 1877 which established New Zealand's first secular, compulsory and free national system of primary education. Under the Act it became compulsory for Pākehā children from ages 7 to 13 to attend primary school and while the Act did not apply to Māori children, they had the option of attending these schools. The Act also sought to establish standards of quality of education as schools varied greatly in their resources and approaches. Before this time children attended schools governed by provincial governments or church or private schools. As with all legislation, the Act's effectiveness depended on its practicability and the resources to enforce it. Many children continued to face difficulties with attending school, especially those from rural areas where their manual labour was important to families. There was a standardised curriculum that "consisted of reading, writing, arithmetic, history and geography, plus sewing and needlework for girls and military drill for boys". The School Attendance Act 1894 confirmed that "every child between the age of seven years and the age of thirteen years is hereby required to attend some public school at least six times a week, morning attendances and afternoon attendances being separately counted". This included Māori children.

The 1877 Act made some difference to Māori and women, enabling a small proportion to proceed to higher education. For example, over 500 Māori girls went to Hukarere Native School for Girls in the Hawke's Bay region between 1877 and 1900. Āpirana Ngata went to Te Aute College at the age of 10 in 1884, won a scholarship and was the first Māori to graduate in a New Zealand university, later becoming a leading politician.

The Act effectively distinguished primary from secondary education: learning in the early years was a universal right, and access to secondary schools was strictly limited.

== Early secondary schools ==
Secondary schooling was not covered by the 1877 Act, but at that time there were schools at this level established by the New Zealand Company, Provincial Councils, private funders and a small number of Māori denomination boarding schools which had originally been mission schools under the Education Ordinance of 1847. Some elementary schools that had added higher classes were also recognised as District High Schools under the 1877 Education Act.

Nelson College which opened on 7 April 1856, is regarded as the first state secondary school in New Zealand.

Around 1900, this level of education was generally for the wealthy elite who intended to go to university or enter professional careers, and it was not free. In 1901, less than 3 percent of those aged between 12 and 18 attended public secondary schools. An additional 5 percent attended district high schools (as they were known) or a Standard 7 class. Educational opportunities improved from around 1902 when secondary schools were given grants to admit more pupils.

Changes by the Secretary of Education, George Hogben, raised the leaving age to 14, and the Secondary Schools Act 1903 required secondary schools to offer free education to all those who "obtained a certificate of competency in the subjects of Standard V". The Education Act 1914 created a "national system for grading and appointing teachers...[and confirmed] secondary schools [were required] to offer free education to those who passed a proficiency examination, with grants paid to schools for these pupils". The Certificate of Proficiency became the major determinant of job and career opportunities. By 1921 nearly 13 percent of 12- to 18-year-olds attended a secondary institution (usually for at least two years) and five years later in 1926, and still in 1939, 25 percent did so.

Most schools continued to attempt to offer a curriculum with strong traditional and authoritarian elements. Schools attempted to balance a 'civilising' cultural and moral education with 'utilitarian', vocational training needs.

== Introduction of technical high schools ==
An attempt to address workforce training needs was made early in the 20th century by introducing technical high schools. They offered practical, vocationally-orientated training. However, they were not a success. Traditional secondary schools were seen by parents as providing a pathway into high-status professions, and a better life. Technical schools were regarded as being for the less-able. The Manual and Technical Institutions Acts of 1900 and 1902 did, however, result in the establishment of technical high schools and "the provision of funding to all schools that introduced subjects such as cooking, woodwork and agriculture".

There was a trend for greater emphasis on vocational training during the 1920s and 1930s, which was part of a modern Western trend in the first half of the century away from spiritual, moral and cultural education to a focus on the education of the workforce.

Prior to the 1940s, students were receiving varying curricula within different types of secondary schools. In 1926 a quarter of secondary students went to technical schools, 2 percent to Māori schools (which emphasised manual skills), 12 percent went to district or agricultural high schools, 10 percent to private schools (including Catholic schools), and just over 50 percent went to state secondary schools.

== The Thomas Report, 1944 ==
The Atmore Report, 1930 was an important landmark document, and many of the measures recommended in this were finally supported by the Labour Prime Minister Peter Fraser who pushed through major reforms in the late 1930s and 1940s.

From 1944, as part of the post-Depression era Labour Government's 'Cradle to Grave' social reforms, secondary education was free and made compulsory up to the age of 15.

The Thomas Report of 1944 was the document which established a common, core and free secondary curriculum for all. This remained in place for fifty years. It introduced School Certificate – examinations sat at the end of Fifth Form, and abolished Matriculation, replacing it with University Entrance – a set of examinations sat at end of Sixth Form. The syllabus material was drawn from both practical and academic strands, with the added aim of catering for students of widely differing abilities, interests, and backgrounds. Despite the core curriculum including literacy, numeracy, science, social studies, physical education and arts and crafts, it was argued that the practices of gender differentiation and streaming ran counter to the rhetoric of equality. Teachers believed that students learned better when streamed into different ability classes as measured by a limited assessment of intelligence IQ. Streams were divided into academic, commercial, and domestic or trades, and students received different versions of the core curriculum.

A number of factors in the post-World War Two era challenged the goals of egalitarian educational opportunities and many students' experiences were still divided by class, race, gender, religion and geography. For example, in 1953, 40 percent of Maori continued to attend Maori primary schools and in 1969 a study of Auckland Grammar School demonstrated that only 1 percent came from working and lower-middle-class backgrounds.

== The Currie Report, 1962 ==
In 1960, a Commission on Education in New Zealand was set up by the government to report on a wide range of matters within the country's education system. The Commission, chaired by George Currie, vice-Chancellor of the University of New Zealand at the time, was asked to "examine primary, secondary and technical education in relation to the present needs of the country", and after hearing five hundred submissions, eight areas of concern were identified. These included training and conditions of service for teachers, possible re-structuring of school administration, acknowledging that education of Māori needed to reflect "equality of opportunity", monitoring of the quality of school work through assessment practices, reviewing the legal basis for religious education in schools and government aid to private schools.

In 1962 the Commission's produced its findings in the Currie Report. With over eight hundred pages and more than three hundred recommendations, the Report was noted by one writer as "a full-length study of the education system...the most comprehensive exercise in educational planning so far undertaken in New Zealand", and acknowledged as a key policy statement with recommendations for legislation, including the Education Act (1964) which later lowered the compulsory school starting age from 7 years to 6 years. Summarising progress in the implementation of the Commissions recommendations in 1972, John Ewing, a former lecturer in education at Victoria University of Wellington and Chief Inspector of Primary Schools, noted that at the time, 134 of the 328 recommendations had been fully implemented, 155 were being considered or implemented in part and 39 had failed to gain support. The writer suggested that changes were on a "broad front...[largely because]...the Commission recognised, supported, and encouraged the main trends and tendencies in the growth of the system [explaining why] a great many of the changes...were expansions of existing services". A study in 1978 claimed that the areas covered by the Commission were "too extensive...too numerous...and beyond all financial resources to be of much practical value", but noted that almost a quarter of the recommendation in the Report "related to the recruitment, training and working conditions of teachers".

A recommendation for smaller class sizes was put on hold until the changes were made to teacher training and there was little support for suggested modifications to the administrative structure of the education system. The transfer of Māori schools to the education boards was speedily implemented, but some recommendations, such as the "extended use of standardised tests as an alternative to 'checkpoint' tests...were modified in action in ways the Commission could not have foreseen". Ewing concluded:

On the whole, the Currie Commission endeavoured to build on to the living and growing system. It wisely avoided laying out a blueprint for the next half century, with all the difficulties, shortcomings, and imponderables that such a task [involved]. It planned very largely from what existed, and this [gave] strength to its findings. Most of its recommendations...led to action and change, and some of them...absorbed into the new machinery of educational planning.

Later commentators agreed the Report was generally uncritical and reinforced a national consensus at the time about the structure and role of the education system. Accordingly the Commission's findings were noted as unanimous and showed no disagreement with themes that underpinned New Zealand educational goals and beliefs which held that the key goal of schooling was to provide equality of opportunity, the system was moving toward this, changes were beneficial and the state should continue to "provide and control education in the system". This situated the Report within the context of a shared belief in the 1950s and 1960s in New Zealand that education was one of the state welfare reforms [that] "in the interests of social equality was widely regarded as a central and distinctive aspect of New Zealand's national identity...[reflecting]...a democratic and egalitarian aspiration". Postwar New Zealand was seen as stable with little criticism of the state, which "led many educational commentators and historians to celebrate the gradual progress and potential benefits of public education in New Zealand".

=== Education Conference 1974 ===
During the 1970s there were increasing calls to review the nature and direction of the centralised education system. The two-year Educational Conference completed in 1974, convened by the then Minister of Education Phil Amos, was a consultation process [involving]..."50,000 parents, teachers, administrators and interested laypeople...debating many aspects of the education system". It encouraged more participation by parents and the wider community in educational decision-making and concluded that there were issues of alienation and frustration within the bureaucracy which they felt was "vast, ponderous and unresponsive, particularly to the special needs of women and girls, Maori and other minorities all of whom were gaining a new assertiveness in this period". The Conference also questioned whether there was equality of opportunity and suggested targeting funding to support the groups in society who were being disadvantaged. Emanating from the Conference was The Working Party on Organisation and Administration (1974) chaired by Arnold Nordmeyer. In their report, some of the key recommendations, which were effectively calls for devolution of the centralised system, suggested more involvement by parents in primary school committees and secondary boards of governors.

=== Further reports ===
Other reports raised concerns about education in New Zealand. Towards Partnership, known as the McComb Report (1976), said that flaws in the system included the lack of parental involvement and too much power concentrated in the Department of Education; and the Scott Report, An Inquiry into the Quality of Teaching (1986), noted that for teacher training to be effective, there needed to be research-based components that clearly identified the required theoretical and practical teaching skills.

== Māori education, 1960 to 1990 ==
During the 1960s there was a growing awareness that the education system in New Zealand was not meeting the needs of Māori children. The report by Jack Hunn in 1961, known as the Hunn Report, presented data that showed under-achievement of Māori in education. The Report recommended a change from assimilation to integration, but little changed because at the time there was a deficit explanation for this that said the problems were largely the result of Māori having "culturally deprived backgrounds". It was recommended that state intervention to address achievement issues should focus on enriching English programmes to overcome this deficit. The Hunn Report also suggested that due to urbanisation of Māori, the separate schools established under the Native Schools Act 1867 were no longer necessary and should be absorbed into the state school system. This concept was supported by the Currie Report in 1962. The proportion of Māori children attending Māori schools had been declining since the 1950s, and by 1968, 85 percent of Māori children attended state primary schools controlled by education boards and only 11.1% were at Māori schools controlled directly by the Education Department. In 1968 the Prime Minister announced that all state Māori schools would be put under the management of education boards, and the last 108 Māori schools were transferred to the control of boards, to be "absorbed or closed", by the beginning of 1969. Politician Matiu Rata said he was surprised how smoothly the transition had happened without major criticism, but Hirini Mead who had taught in Native Schools said that the "wholesale transfer" to education board control "came as a shock and betrayal". Linda Tuhiwai Smith however, held that while the native schools did to some extent fulfill the goal "to Europeanise, and thereby civilise Māori", this was contested by Māori who engaged "in education as an intervention into the conditions that colonisation had provided for them...[in a way that was]...remarkable for its perseverance and optimism".

While the Currie Report did reinforce the idea current at the time that the New Zealand education system was making good progress in achieving its goal of equality of opportunity for all students, it also identified Māori as a group not being well served by the system, although no recommendations were made to address this. One reviewer noted the Commission of Enquiry that brought about the Currie Report was not asked specifically to examine Māori education, [but] "everywhere it looked...it saw that overhead, above the ordinary difficulties facing every child and every school, Māori children and Māori Schools had special difficulties...[with]...a very great effort needed now by all concerned for the education of...Māori children".

During the latter half of the 1960s, there was growing support for greater recognition of Māori language, led by groups such as Ngā Tamatoa and a petition organised by Patu Hohepa in 1967 which stated that Māori language "forms part of our national heritage".

By the 1970s the state had moved toward recognition of diversity through establishing multicultural programmes and the introduction of taha Māori into some schools in an effort to "quieten Māori resistance based on their culture...[but]...did nothing to challenge the unequal power relations between Māori and non-Māori". The Educational Development Conference 1974 concluded that there were inequities in society that were being reflected in the education system, [which suggested] "the goal of equality of opportunity was not being realised". The Māori Organisation on Human Rights supported calls by New Zealand Māori Council that the NZ's education system [needed] "to put a positive evaluation on Maori identity", by making its own submissions to the 1974 Development Conference. Protest by Māori was increasing and the establishment of the Waitangi Tribunal in 1973 highlighted the fact that there was little knowledge of the Treaty in the school curriculum. As Māori questioned how the state could preserve their culture, the importance of the language became paramount and in 1982 the first Te Kohanga Reo immersion language pre-school opened in Wainuiomata. The Waitangi Tribunal recognised that the language needed to be recognised and protected under the Treaty in 1985, and in that year the first Māori language school, Kura Kaupapa Māori, was established at Hoani Waititi Marae in Auckland. These schools were recognised under the Education Amendment Act 1989.

While the goals of Te Kohanga Reo and Kura Kaupapa Māori were initially about the survival of the language, they did become part of a wider movement encapsulated in the 2003 Ministry of Education's Māori strategic plan that positioned such initiatives as a means of self-determination for Māori to have full access to their culture, language, resources and tikanga. Graham Hingangaroa Smith saw this as a "shift in mindset of large numbers of Māori people...[to being proactive and motivated]...in a reawakening of the Māori imagination that had been stifled and diminished by colonisation processes".

== Establishment of self-managing schools ==
The 1984 – 1990 Labour government led by David Lange, introduced a range of free market, neoliberal economic reforms and in 1987 New Zealand Treasury produced a brief to the re-elected Labour government, the second part of which dealt exclusively with education. The paper raised concerns about some government interventions into education but concluded that for primary school education, such intervention was necessary. The document also claimed that educational services were like other goods traded in the market place. While the government had reviewed the curriculum in April 1987 with generally favourable response from the education sector, Treasury's position was that it didn't deal with the relationship between education and the economy or have an approach to manage the issues of consumer choice. The Government appointed a taskforce led by a businessman Brian Picot to review education in June 1987, and their final report was released in May 1988. One recommendation of the report was suggested that schools needed to be "autonomous, self-managing learning institutions".

In August 1988 the Fourth Labour Government of New Zealand, published Tomorrow's Schools which accepted most of the recommendations of the Picot Report, setting the changes into law with the Education Act 1989. Schools became autonomous entities, managed by Boards of Trustees and as of 2024, this model continues.

== National standards ==
On 10 April 2007 the National Party released a policy for National Standards requiring all primary and intermediate schools in New Zealand to focus on clear standards in literacy and numeracy, effective assessment programmes and "plain language" reporting to parents. A stated rationale for National Standards was for shared expectations about achievement and identifying students who risked not gaining basic skills. The Education (National Standards) Amendment Bill, introduced to the New Zealand Parliament on 13 December 2008, gave the Minister of Education, Anne Tolley the power to begin a consultation round with the education sector to set and design national standards in literacy and numeracy against which schools would be required to report parents after using "assessment programmes that compare the progress of their students with those standards". Schools would be able to choose from a range of assessment tools, [and] "parents [would] have the right to see all assessment information and receive regular plain English reports about their child's progress towards national standards". In August 2009, Tolley, announced a timeline for the implementation of the Standards, and in a letter to Boards of Trustees, principals and teachers at New Zealand schools, said that from 2012 school annual reports would include data showing progress and achievement in relation to the standards.

Concerns were expressed early about the haste in introducing the Standards and that they had not been trialled. Jennifer Clarke, President of the Otago Primary Principals Association asked for a "robust trial of the National Standards to prove accuracy, credibility and positive impact on student achievement...[and that]...there is no school ranking lists". Possible league tables which could result in schools being ranked was also seen as problematic by John Hattie. The Principals' Association of Otaki-Kapiti sent a remit to Tolley in August 2010 recommending that schools in this area did not participate in National Standards until there was a working partnership between Tolley and the schools. Tolley said this group of schools represented a "vocal minority who were unhappy with National Standards", however New Zealand Principals' Federation President Ernie Buutveld said "there [was] a growing solidarity around the country to get a resolution the sector can live with." Other principals' associations from around New Zealand had concerns such as the possible assumption within the process that "all children can achieve at the same level at the same time each year", that the Standards could narrow the curriculum to a focus on just literacy and numeracy, and they [were] "not designed to reflect a Māori world view and will therefore once again, be an 'assessment tool' that marginalis[ed] Māori learners within our education system".

Academic critique of the rationale for the Standards included questioning why the Minister was focusing on literacy and numeracy when data suggested there were issues related to assessment in other areas of the curriculum. It was also suggested that there was an absence of proof the standards would work, they were complex and it would be difficult to moderate data that had been gathered from different sources. An open letter to Tolley from academics saw some merit in the concept of clearly identifying levels of student achievement but noted "flaws" in the system, including the possible labelling of students as "failures" and undermining of the curriculum.

Between 25 May and 3 July 2009, the Ministry of Education received submissions on the proposed National Standards from parents, teachers, principals and Boards of Trustees. These submissions were analysed by the New Zealand Council for Educational Research (NZCER) and the findings submitted in a report to the Ministry of Education in August 2009. The report showed that parents were generally supportive of the concept of learning goals for their child and the different ways they could get information about achievement, with 49% saying that the most important way schools could help them support their child's learning was to "share information about child's progress in timely way with good access to teachers". However, 38% of parent did express concerns, compared to 14% who had a positive response when asked for further comments. Analysis of the submissions from the education sector showed there were issues about "labelling" of students, how the standards would work for students with special needs, a possible narrowing of the curriculum and teaching practice, and fear that data could be published in leagues tables comparing schools. However, the views of this group did emphasise "the usefulness of parents having clear, timely, honest, accurate and valid information about their child's progress, and a picture that covered ―the whole child as an individual, looking to the future through setting goals together, as well as reporting on current performance".

Initially some schools were not compliant with the assessment and reporting process and in 2012, Hekia Parata, the then Minister of Education, said in the media that non-compliance was "unacceptable" because schools were crown entities and information was public. Parata said on 11 June 2013 that National Standards data showed some "concerning trends" including achievement being "significantly lower for Māori and Pasifika learners than for others" and boys trailing girls.

A press release from NZCER on 29 November 2013 summarised the findings of a survey into the impact of National Standards. The data showed only 7% of principals and 15% of teachers thought the standards themselves were robust, while trustees and some parents said they had a good understanding of the standards. The summary concluded that "there has been no marked difference in student achievement since the standards were introduced and no evidence that standards have spurred parents of low performing students to become more engaged in their children's learning". The data was discussed in more detail in a paper presented at the New Zealand Association for Research in Education (RARE) conference in Dunedin on 26–28 December 2013. A survey in 2016 concluded from the data that "National Standards have been incorporated into teaching and learning and used by school leaders as indicators of student need, experiences of using them continue to raise questions about their role in student learning and performance".

== Educational reforms, 2017–2023 ==
=== Removal of National Standards ===
The Labour government on 12 December 2017 announced the abolishment of the national standards in reading, writing and maths. Education Minister Chris Hipkins said parents had lost confidence in the standards and from 2018 schools would no longer be required to report their students' results in the standards to the Ministry of Education. The announcement had been anticipated since the Labour-led government took power as all three parties involved in the government campaigned on promises of getting rid of the benchmarks for primary and intermediate school children. The decision was welcomed and widely supported.

=== Review of Tomorrow's Schools ===
In 2018 following calls for a review of the Tomorrow's Schools model the government confirmed it would set up a Taskforce for this purpose. After a period of consultation, the final report of the Taskforce was released in September 2019. The Government responded in November 2019. This document established five objectives to meet the Taskforce's recommendations on the review of Tomorrow's schools: Learners at the Centre; Barrier free access; Quality teaching and leadership; future of learning and work; and World class inclusive public education. NELP and TES retained these objectives with actions relevant to the priorities.

The Education and Training Act (2020) was passed on 1 August 2020 implementing many of the Taskforce's recommendations

=== Curriculum review ===
By 2018, the focus on educational change by the government had moved toward a review of the curriculum with the establishment of the Curriculum, Progress, and Achievement programme. In 2019 a report from the Curriculum Progress, and Achievement Ministerial Advisory Group, provided advice on improving the curriculum, focusing on strengthening the design and embedding of a stronger focus of student progress in the document, and meeting information needs across the system for all students in years 1–10 in New Zealand schools.

In 2020, the Ministry of Education asked the New Zealand Council of Educational Research (NZCER), along with two universities, to provide supporting research for this project, and a range of reports were completed, including one on the suitability of the curriculum-levelling construct that underpinned the curriculum at the time.

A full refresh of the curriculum was confirmed on 11 February 2021. The associate Ministers of Education said the goal was make the curriculum "clearer, more relevant, easier to use, and more explicit about what learners need to understand, know and do...beginning with Aotearoa New Zealand’s histories in the Social Sciences learning area". A former politician Peter Dunne suggested there should have been a more "immediate and active debate about what the refresh would entail", and questioned whether the refresh would ensure "access to and learning about the latest and best knowledge" on what was being taught internationally and not just on national and local factors. Dunne concluded that the curriculum refresh process: [needed] "to be broadly based and inclusive...[and avoid being]...captured and driven by education sector vested interests".

==== History curriculum ====
The report from the Curriculum, Progress, and Achievement Ministerial Advisory Group (2019) had specifically identified "focus areas for Māori medium and English medium settings which shaped the recommendations to Cabinet, including addressing aspects of trust and equity", and in response, in September 2019, Chris Hipkins confirmed that "Aotearoa New Zealand's histories would be taught in all schools and kura from 2022...revised to 2023 to give schools and kura more time to engage with curriculum content". Pressure for this to be compulsory had come from petitions to the New Zealand parliament in 2015 and 2019, and ongoing academic and public debate. An extensive process of consultation began in 2020 when two Curriculum Writing Groups drafted content for Aotearoa New Zealand's histories in The New Zealand Curriculum and Te Takanga o Te Wā in Te Marautanga o Aotearoa, with the content being surveyed, trialled and reviewed in 2021.

There was mixed reception to the draft documents. Some concerns were expressed about possible gaps in the history to be covered, there were questions raised about the focus on content rather than the process of how students learn, and a point raised by a politician that the emphasis on studying colonisation was likely to cause divisions amongst New Zealanders. Positive responses included comments from the New Zealand Historical Association and a review by the New Zealand Council for Educational Research that indicated feedback from the public that the content was timely and "overdue".

The final versions of the documents were launched on 17 March 2022. Aotearoa New Zealand's histories, while a standalone document, was aligned with the English-medium New Zealand Curriculum. The structure and content focussed on "big ideas" in New Zealand history was challenged by Brooke van Velden who suggested the curriculum was over-focused on colonisation and promoted a narrative ignoring the multiethnic nature of New Zealand society by just focussing on "two sets of people, Māori and Pākehā". James Shaw, however, said it was important to deal honestly with the past; an academic noted the new approach as reflecting New Zealand had matured as a society; and the president of the Maori Principals' Association saw the curriculum as potentially transformational. Te Takanga o Te Wā is a new strand in the Māori-medium curriculum, Te Matauranga o Aotearoa, which recognised that students explore history by learning about themselves and connections to the world, "to understand their own identity as Māori in Aotearoa".

==== First draft of Te Mātaiaho ====
In March 2022, progress on the full refresh of the New Zealand curriculum was confirmed with a detailed timeline, and in March 2023, the draft document Te Mātaiaho, with reviewed purpose statements and overviews for the teaching of Social Sciences, English and mathematics, was released. The elements in these three curriculum areas retained the Understand, Know and Do approach of the reviewed History curriculum. A process for feedback on the English and Mathematics & Statistics learning areas was confirmed on 28 September 2023 and schools were provided with a Curriculum and Assessment Forward Planner.

Literacy & Communication and Maths Strategy, published by the government in March 2022, noted that key to the refresh was ensuring literacy and communication and numeracy demands were more explicit within the New Zealand curriculum, but two academics claimed this strategy document did not identify the strategies necessary to meet the requirements of the English curriculum, relying on them being explicit within indicators said to show progress, but likely to "[reinforce] a wait-to-fail ethos for ākonga [students]".

In a letter sent to Chris Hipkins, the then Prime Minister and former Minister of Education, a group of academics called for the education reforms to be repealed. The authors raised concerns around a radicalized curriculum with "identity categorisation" based on the racial classification of children, and the danger of 'culturally responsive pedagogies' leading to stereotypical views about how Māori and Pasifika students learn.

Educator Stuart Middleton welcomed the refresh as "a significant and long awaited development in New Zealand Education".

== Political changes, 2023 ==
As New Zealand approached a general election in 2023, the country's education system and the policies of the competing political parties came under scrutiny in the media. One commentator identified differing opinions amongst education researchers about the degree that student achievement data was a measure of the system's strength, particularly when there were differences between data from international tests and that from domestic assessments. Nina Hood from the University of Auckland held that the data from the PISA test showed a widespread decline in achievement, and in spite of domestic assessment not indicating this, by the time students reached their final year before high school, "only 56 per cent at or above the curriculum level in reading, 45 per cent in maths and down to only 20 per cent in science". In the same article another academic claimed the number of New Zealand students achieving at the highest level was above the OECD average, but the issue was addressing inequities to lift the performance of students in the lowest 20 per cent. Charles Darr, Chief Researcher with the New Zealand Council for Educational Research (NZCER) stated that a national study of student achievement he was involved in did not show a major decline, and cautioned against "jumping straight into crisis mode". The piece did, however, note that a summary from the Ministry of Education had concluded international data indicated: "New Zealand had one of the largest gaps between the highest and lowest-scoring students, who generally came from disadvantaged backgrounds, and this had not improved over time". Another journalist cited achievement data for New Zealand students from 2009 to make the case that generally there had been a downward trend in achievement, particularly for Māori and Pacific learners and those from lower socio-economic backgrounds, raising the concern that, for these students, "the status quo [would] entrench inequitable outcomes". The same article drew on information from a government paper, Preparing All Young People for Satisfying and Rewarding Working Lives: Long-Term Insights Briefing, and provided an analysis of the positions and policies of each of the main political parties contesting the election.

Early in the election campaign, Christopher Luxon released an education policy for the New Zealand National Party based on a proposed review of the curriculum and an increased focus on basic literacy and numeracy skills. Luxon said it was about addressing underachievement and having a curriculum that showed teachers and parents what students would be expected to learn each year. He acknowledged the current government's Literacy and Communication and Maths Strategy did not advocate a narrowing of the curriculum by focusing on foundational skills, but explained that the point of difference with the party's policy was in "tightening up the year bands". The president of the Principals' Association claimed the policy was a return to National Standards and would fail to focus on inequities or supporting students with high needs, and Chris Hipkins suggested that National and Labour could work together and achieve a "bipartisan consensus" on a curriculum rewrite. Jan Tinetti questioned the lack of consultancy with the sector and whether the policy had been accurately funded, but National's education spokesperson, Erica Stanford responded that the policy was a response to feedback from curriculum experts, and while "maths, reading, writing and science...[would be priortised]...over everything else", it was not a return to National Standards. The president of New Zealand Educational Institute stated the union's position was to focus on addressing resourcing rather than increasing standards or curriculum changes, [creating] "more work for the teachers at the chalk face", and an academic said National's policy was built on a "manufactured crisis...[referred to]...dated international league tables...[blamed]...failing schools and failing teachers...[and]...undoes much of an informal pact between National and Labour to depoliticise education at a time of genuine struggle".

== See also ==
- History of New Zealand
- Vincent O'Malley
