= Department of Education (New Zealand) =

Agency overview
- Formed: 1877
- Dissolved: 1989
- Superseding agency: Ministry of Education
- Jurisdiction: New Zealand
- Headquarters: Wellington

The New Zealand Department of Education was, prior to 1989, the public service department of the New Zealand government that was responsible for pre-tertiary education.

The department was established in its initial form in 1877 under the Education Act 1877.

In 1989 it was replaced by a decentralised Ministry of Education under the Tomorrow's Schools reforms that were initiated in response to the Picot task force report of May 1988. Some of its functions were moved to separate agencies such as Learning Media Limited (1992) and the New Zealand Qualifications Authority (1993).

== Notable people ==
Notable people associated with the Department of Education include:

- C. E. Beeby (Director from 1940)
- Keith Sheen (Director-General 1966–1971)
- Ned Dobbs (Director-General 1971–1975)
- Bill Renwick (Director-General 1975–1987)
- Robin Williams (Director-General)
- Ernest Marsden

== See also ==
- History of education in New Zealand
- Education in New Zealand
