= Peter Ramsay =

New Zealand academic (1939–2019)

Peter Ramsay QSM
- Born: Peter Douglas Kenneth Ramsay; 1939
- Died: 21 July 2019 (aged 79); Hamilton, New Zealand
- Spouse: Lesley
- Children: 2

Academic background
- Education: Victoria University of Wellington (MA); University of Waikato (DPhil)

Academic work
- Discipline: Education
- Institutions: University of Waikato

Peter Douglas Kenneth Ramsay QSM (1939 – 21 July 2019) was a New Zealand academic. He was a professor of education at the University of Waikato, and was a member of the Picot task force in 1987–1988. Ramsay was also noted for his contributions to daffodil breeding.

== Academic career ==
Ramsay studied at Victoria University of Wellington, where he obtained a Bachelor of Arts degree, as well as a Diploma of Education and a Diploma of Teaching from Wellington Teachers' College. His MA thesis, supervised by Ian McLaren and completed in 1969, was titled Planning, policy, and practice in Maori education, 1936–1968, and examined some of the reasons for the relative underachievement of Māori in education at that time as identified by the Hunn Report. He later completed a DPhil at the University of Waikato.

Ramsay was a faculty member of the School of Education at the University of Waikato, rising to the rank of professor. His educational research and publications were across a broad range of topics, including preschool education, Māori education, curriculum development, teaching training, nursing education, the impacts of new technology on teaching, and the socialisation of teachers.

Early in his career, while he was a primary school teacher in Wellington, Ramsay became active in the New Zealand Educational Institute (NZEI), and from 1968 to 1970 he was the first curriculum officer of the NZEI. Between 1970 and 1974, he served on the NZEI's Waikato branch committee, and was a member of the national executive between 1975 and 1981. Between 1987 and 1988, Ramsay was a member of the Picot task force, established by the New Zealand government to examine the school system with a mandate to examine management structures and cost-effectiveness.

In 1976, Ramway was made an associate fellow of the NZEI, and in 1986 he was made an honorary fellow of the NZEI. He was made an honorary fellow of the University of Waikato in 2000. In the 2007 New Year Honours, Ramsay was awarded the Queen's Service Medal for public services.

== Daffodil breeding ==
With his wife Lesley, Ramsay gained an international reputation for showing and hybrising daffodils, registering 116 daffodil hybrids between 1992 and 2018. Two of these, "Blossom Lady" and "Cameo Magic", were awarded First Class Certificates at the National Daffodil Society of New Zealand (NDSNZ) daffodil awards, in 2007 and 2013, respectively. In 2008, Ramsay was awarded the gold medal of the American Daffodil Society, and in 2013 he won the Peter Barr Cup from the Royal Horticultural Society, for contributions to the advancement and enjoyment of daffodils.

He served as president of the NDSNZ, was awarded life membership of the society in 1990, and latterly was its vice-patron. Ramsay was also an international daffodil judge, and was involved in the establishment of the horticultural pavilion in Hamilton Gardens.

== Death ==
Ramsay died in Hamilton on 21 July 2019, aged 79 years.
