= Education Act 1877 =

Act of Parliament in New Zealand

New Zealand Parliament
- Commenced: 1 January 1878

Legislative history
- Passed: 29 November 1877

Repealed by
- Education Acts Compilation Act 1904
- Status: Repealed

The Education Act 1877 established twelve regional education boards in New Zealand after the provinces were abolished and the central government took control of education. The act established that education would be free, compulsory, and secular for non-Māori children aged five to thirteen, and optional for Māori children.

== History ==
Education had previously been the responsibility of provincial governments. Through the Abolition of Provinces Act 1875, the provinces ceased to exist on 1 January 1877. The Canterbury education system developed by William Rolleston was used as an exemplar for the Education Act 1877, and under Rolleston's guidance, Charles Bowen helped form the legislation. The act passed into law on 29 November 1877 and came into operation on 1 January 1878.

The Education Act 1877 was repealed through the Education Acts Compilation Act 1904, also known under its short title "The Education Act, 1904", and passed into law on 4 November 1904.

== Effects ==
The act established that education would be free, compulsory, and secular for Pākehā children aged seven to thirteen. Māori children were also welcome to attend school, but compulsory primary school education for Māori children did not become law until 1894. 435 Māori and part-Māori children were attending public schools during 1880. In 1882, the Minister of Education stated: "A perceptible increase in the numbers of Maori and half-caste children attending the public schools, especially the latter, is recorded. The increase would be still more noticeable, but for the unwillingness on the part of many parents of both races to allow their children to be taught in schools open to both races".

Compulsory attendance did not happen in practice. There were various exemptions: if a child lived more than two miles distant from a school or the road to school was not passable for a child; if the child had a sickness or disability that prevented attendance at school, or if the child attended a private school or had reached the standard set at a public school. In 1880, only a few years after the act was passed, officials calculated that average attendance during the year was 76.6%. Especially in rural areas, children often helped with tasks at home rather than attend school. Epidemics could also dramatically affect attendance: for example, in 1882 there were serious outbreaks of scarlet fever, measles and diphtheria in different parts of the country that caused drops in attendance at school. Ongoing truancy problems led to the introduction of the School Attendance Act in 1894. This act also made school attendance (at a public or native school) compulsory for Māori children.

== Education boards ==
The act established a tiered administration system. At the top, the Department of Education established the curriculum and provided funding to twelve education boards (Auckland, Taranaki, Wanganui, Wellington, Hawke's Bay, Marlborough, Nelson, North and South Canterbury, Westland, Otago and Southland). Each of the boards in turn funded school committees responsible for individual schools.

The education boards were responsible only for primary education and not secondary or tertiary education.

Name of board	Succeeded	Founded	Expelled
Auckland Education Board		1877	
Hamilton Education Board		1877	
Hawkes Bay Education Board		1877	
Taranaki Education Board		1877	
Wanganui Education Board		1877	
Wellington Education Board		1877	
Nelson Education Board		1877	
Grey/Greymouth Education Board (aka West Coast/Westland Education Board)		1877	
Southland Education Board		1877	
Westland Education Board		1877	
Canterbury Education Board		1877	
Otago Education Board		1877	

== Auckland Education Board ==
Prior to the 1877 act an Auckland Education Board was established by the provincial government. This was reconstituted with the passing on the 1877 act. The new board covered the entirety of the Auckland Province but by 1878 the East Cape was excluded. In 1952 a South Auckland Education Board was constituted and the Auckland Education Board's area was reduced to the Northland, and Auckland regions, Great Barrier Island, and parts of the Waikato and Raglan counties.

== See also ==
- History of education in New Zealand
