= Whetumarama Wereta =

New Zealand political scientist

Whetumarama Wereta (Whetu Wereta, née Rolleston, ?–2023) was a Māori political scientist and statistician from Lower Hutt, New Zealand. She belonged to the Ngāi Te Rangi and Ngāti Ranginui iwis. Wereta has served as the Mäori representative on several government commissions or committees on the electoral system, education and justice.

== Career ==
Wereta gained a BA Hons degree, then joined the Department of Statistics in the early 1970s. In 1992, Wereta became manager, Maori Statistics. She has also worked as a policy researcher and/or a manager in the Ministry of Maori Development and its predecessors, and in the Department of Internal Affairs. Wereta was employed as a social researcher at the Department of Maori Affairs in Wellington in 1988. Wereta served on the New Zealand National Commission for UNESCO. She was one of the three members of the Local Government Commission from 1 April 1990 until 31 March 1993, along with Sir Brian Elwood and Doug Pearson. Rejoining Statistics New Zealand in 2001, she was appointed General Manager, Maori Statistics.

== Public policy advisor ==
Wereta was a member of the five-person 1985-86 New Zealand Royal Commission on the Electoral System that recommended mixed member proportional representation (MMP) for elections to the New Zealand Parliament, a major change from the previous first-past-the-post system. She was the only member of the commission with a known political affiliation (to the Labour Party), and also the only Maori and the only woman on the commission. The committee embraced the principles of fairness to women and to the Maori in their report, which was accepted. New Zealand now follows an MMP system of elections.

In 1988, Wereta was appointed to serve on the Picot task force to review the functions of the Department of Education. Her role on the task force was to emphasise a Maori perspective. As the only Maori on the task force, she was at first marginalized. It was only when she threatened to resign that it was agreed to include a section on Maori aspirations in the report. The Picot Task Force caused fundamental changes in the New Zealand educational system towards greater school autonomy and separation of regulatory responsibilities into different agencies.

In 1994, Wereta was appointed to the four-person Mäori Committee to the New Zealand Law Commission, an independent advisory body set up to review, reform and develop the law of New Zealand. The purpose of the committee is to assist the Law Commission in the "development of a bicultural framework for the law of New Zealand". She was a member of that committee when, on 15 September 1995, it submitted a report that rejected in the strongest terms the government proposal to abolish the right of appeal to the Privy Council. She was a contributor to the April 1999 report by the Law Commission on Justice: The Experiences of Mäori Women.

In 2006, Wereta was appointed the government's representative on the Representation Commission to determine the boundaries of the Maori electoral districts. Other members were John McEnteer, representing the opposition, and Judge Bernard Kendall, chairperson. Dr Pita Sharples, co-leader of the Māori Party, criticized the appointment on the grounds that the government had not consulted his party.

== Papers ==
As an authority on statistics, and Maori statistics in particular, Wereta has published and presented a number of academic papers. In 2002, she presented a paper on Statistics in the Wake of Challenges Posed by Cultural Diversity in a Globalization Context at the International Symposium on Cultural Statistics in Montreal, Quebec, Canada. In July 2005 she was a keynote speaker at a conference of the Population Association of New Zealand. At a March 2006 meeting in Ottawa, Ontario, Canada of the UN Permanent Forum of Indigenous Peoples she presented a paper on Towards a Maori Statistics Framework.

Other papers:

- Whetu Wereta (December 1994). "Māori Demographic Trends". Social Policy Journal of New Zealand (3).
- Whetu Wereta and Darin Bishop (2004). "Towards a Maori Statistics Framework". United Nations.
- Forbes, Sharleen; Galvin, Vince; Hunter, Andrew; Maxwell, Paul; Wereta, Whetu (2011). "Recent challenges to the ethics underlying official statistics in New Zealand". Statistical Journal of the IAOS. doi:10.3233/SJI-2011-0725.
