= Jack Hunn =

New Zealand civil servant

Sir Jack Kent Hunn CMG (24 August 1906 – 14 June 1997) was a New Zealand civil servant. Hunn served as Secretary of Defence, Secretary of Maori Affairs, Secretary of Justice, and Chairman of the Fire Service Commission.

== Early life ==
Hunn was born in Masterton, and attended Wairarapa High School, before joining the Public Trust Office as a cadet. He attended Victoria University of Wellington, where he gained an LLM. Hunn joined the PSA in 1940, and worked on the executive, and became New Zealand Public Service Association President in 1945. In 1946, Hunn stepped down to become an Inspector of the Public Service Commission, working within Government to resolve public sector industrial issues. He became a commissioner in 1954, and expanded his knowledge across a broad range of the public service. While a commissioner, Hunn acted as secretary of Internal Affairs, Secretary of Justice, and Secretary of Maori Affairs.

== Hunn Report ==
In 1960, Prime Minister Walter Nash engaged Hunn to do a review of the Maori Affairs Department. Hunn included in his review a wide-ranging summary of Maori assets, and the state of Maori in New Zealand at the time. Maori were going through a process of urbanisation, and Hunn's report raised the issue of integration of Maori within broader New Zealand, as opposed to segregation or assimilation. The Nash government was defeated in the 1961 election, and the Hunn report was released to the public on 17 January 1961 by Ralph Hanan, the Minister of Maori Affairs in the new National-led government. It served as the blueprint for the establishment of the Maori Education Foundation, and the New Zealand Maori Council, and became the basis for how the government dealt with Māori issues for the next twelve years.

== Secretary of Defence ==
Hunn was appointed to the new role of Secretary of Defence in 1963. This involved the establishment of a civilian department to be charged with defence policy, separate from the military Chiefs of Defence Staff. He advocated a full integration of the New Zealand Defence services, but was opposed by the individual military forces.

During 1964 Hunn was a strong opponent of New Zealand involvement in Vietnam. Initially, New Zealand Ambassador to Washington George Laking was a strong advocate for intervention, with internal opposition from Secretary of Foreign Affairs Alister McIntosh. Hunn was the clearest opponent: while Defence Chiefs were in favour of New Zealand involvement, Hunn argued that New Zealand's interests remained with supporting Malaysia, but that South Vietnam was not a sovereign state, and did not need military support. When New Zealand sent combat forces to Vietnam in 1965, Hunn retired early from Defence.

== Retirement ==
Hunn served as chairman of the Fire Service Commission from 1973 to 1977, and under the mandate of Internal Affairs Minister Allan Highet, he established a national professional fire service from a large number of small, provincial brigades. He also wrote his memoir, Not Only Affairs of State.

== Personal life ==
Hunn's two sons have been prominent in public life: his elder son, Don Hunn, was a senior diplomat and served as State Services Commissioner, and his younger son, John, was Chief Executive and Chairman of the Todd Corporation.

== Honours ==
Hunn was appointed a Companion of the Order of St Michael and St George in the 1964 Queen's Birthday Honours. In the 1976 New Year Honours, he was made a Knight Bachelor for public services, especially as chair of the Fire Services Commission. In 1977, he was awarded the Queen Elizabeth II Silver Jubilee Medal.

Trade union offices
Preceded by Bert O’Keefe	President of the Public Service Association; 1945–1946	Succeeded by Jack Lewin
