= Education in New Zealand =

Ministry of Education / Te Tāhuhu o Te Mātauranga
- Minister of Education: Erica Stanford

National education budget (2025/26)
- Budget: NZ$2.5 billion, over the four years from budget 2025

General details
- Primary languages: English, Māori
- System type: Decentralised national

Literacy (2025)
- Total: 99%
- Male: 99%
- Female: 99%

Enrollment (2024)
- Total: 850,999
- Primary: 470,517
- Secondary: 305,253
- Post secondary: 402,470

Attainment (2023)
- Secondary diploma: 84%
- Post-secondary diploma: 67%

The education system in New Zealand implements a three-tier model which includes primary and intermediate schools, followed by secondary schools (high schools) and by tertiary education at universities and polytechnics. The academic year in New Zealand varies between institutions, but generally runs from early February until mid-December for primary schools, late January to late November or early December for secondary schools and polytechnics, and from late February until mid-November for universities.

In 2018 the Programme for International Student Assessment (PISA), published by the Organisation for Economic Co-operation and Development (OECD), ranked New Zealand 12th-best at science, 12th-best at reading, and 27th-best in maths; however, New Zealand's mean scores have been steadily dropping in all three categories. The Education Index, published as part of the UN's Human Development Index, consistently ranks New Zealand's education among the highest in the world. Following a 2019 Curia Market Research survey of general knowledge, researchers planned to release a report in 2020 assessing whether New Zealand's education curriculum is fit for purpose. The study found that people in New Zealand lack basic knowledge in English, maths, science, geography, and history.

The Human Rights Measurement Initiative found that as of 2022 New Zealand achieved 95.9% of what should be possible at its level of income for the right to education.

== History ==
Before the arrival of Europeans, Māori ran schools to pass on traditional knowledge including songs, chants, tribal history, spiritual understanding, and knowledge of medicinal plants. These wānanga were usually run by elders called tohunga, respected for their tribal knowledge and teaching was confined to the rangatira (chiefly) class. Reading and writing were unknown, but wood carving was well developed.

Formal European-style schooling was first introduced in 1815 and was well established in 1832 by the London Missionary Society missionaries, who learned Māori and built the first schools in the Bay of Islands. Both children and adults were taught. The main resources were the Christian New Testament and slates, and teaching was in the Māori language. For many years the Bible was the only literature used in teaching, and this became a major factor in how Māori viewed the European world. In the 1850s a Māori trade school was established at Te Awamutu by John Gorst to teach Māori practical skills associated with European-style farming, but in 1863 was burnt down by Rewi Maniapoto in the early stages of New Zealand Wars.

Teaching by missionaries in Native schools were in Māori between 1815 and 1900. The Young Māori Party MPs, especially Māui Pōmare and Āpirana Ngata, advocated the teaching of Māori children in English, as well as teaching hygiene to lower the Māori sickness and death rates. Pōmare was knighted after WW1 for his work in improving Māori learning and integration into New Zealand society.

The absence of a national education system meant that the first sizeable secondary education providers were grammar schools and other private institutions. The first grammar school in New Zealand, Auckland Grammar School, was established in 1850 and formally recognised as an educational establishment in 1868 through the Auckland Grammar School Appropriation Act. Some schools were set up by religious groups, and others by provincial governments. Nelson and Otago were better funded and more efficient education systems than northern provinces such as Auckland; Auckland Board of Education was set up in 1857, under the Education Act of that year, and had 45 schools by 1863.

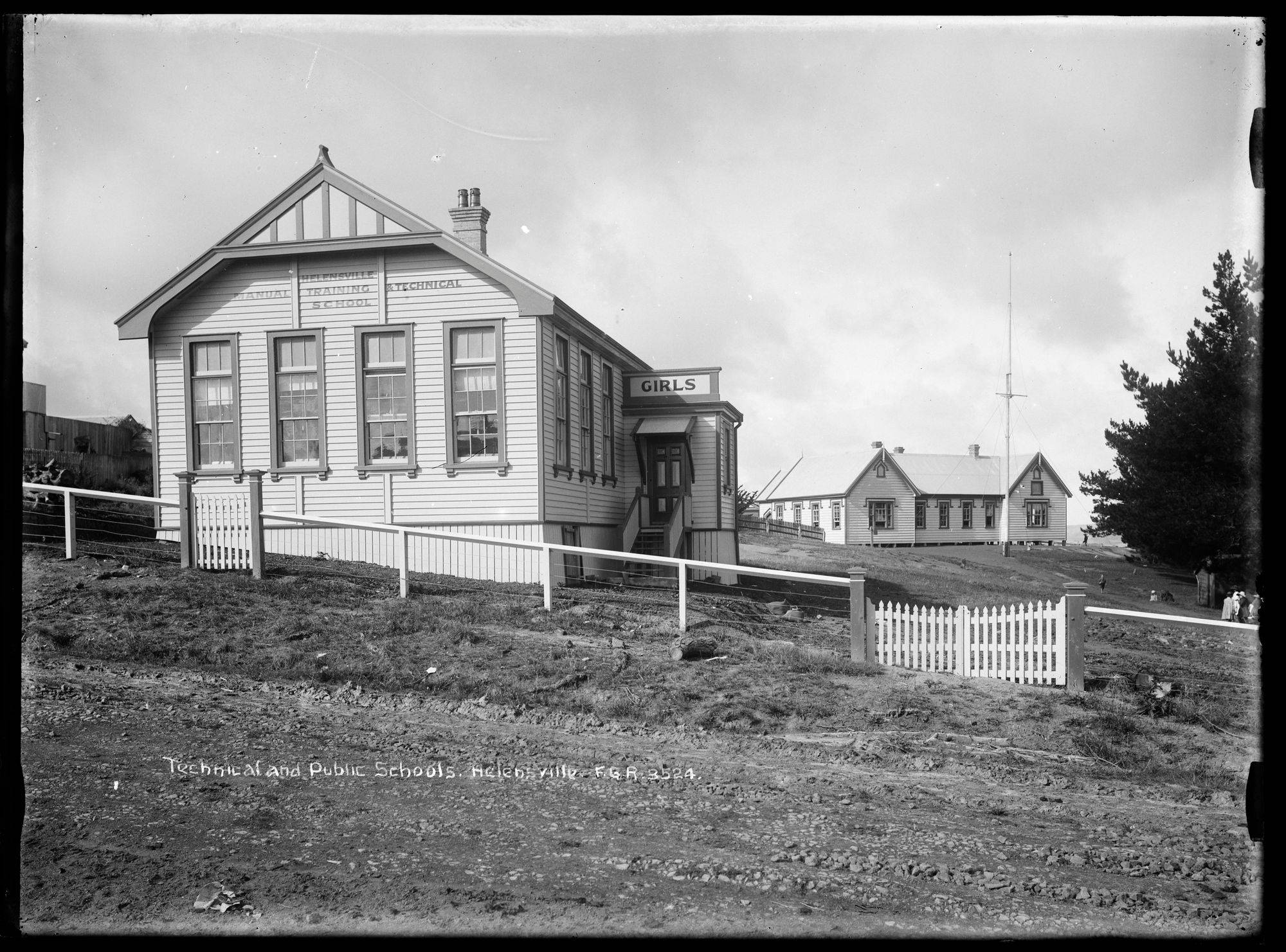
Helensville Manual Training School with a separate entrance for girls

The Canterbury Provincial Council passed its first Educational Ordinance in 1857, appointed a Board of Education in 1863, and had eighty-four school districts by 1873 when it changed funding from school fees to rating land to provide free secular primary education in its schools.

Following the abolition of the provinces in November 1876, New Zealand established a free, compulsory, and secular national state education system from 1 January 1878, largely modelled on the Canterbury system.

Victorian ideals had an influence on New Zealand education and schools even if open to both genders would often separate boys and girls.

== Early childhood education ==
Many children attend some form of early childhood education before they begin school.

Early childhood education in New Zealand can be centre based and led by teachers or parents, or home based.

Centre-based and teacher-led services include:

- Kindergarten (age three to school age), commonly known as kindy
- Puna Reo
- Licensed Early Childhood Education and Care Centres (age 0 to school age), commonly known as day care or preschool.

At least 50% of the adults who work with children at a teacher-led early childhood education service must be qualified early learning teachers, with Kindergarten having 100% qualified teachers. Some services have a particular language or cultural focus, or have a specific set of beliefs about teaching and learning, for example Rudolf Steiner, Montessori, Kindergarten.

Centre-based and whānau-led or parent-led services include:

- Kohanga Reo
- Playcentre (age zero to school age)
- Playgroups

Early childhood education services have to be licensed or certified by the Ministry of Education but are not Government-owned like state schools.

Licensed early childhood education services and certified playgroups must follow the early childhood education curriculum framework, Te Whāriki.

== Primary and secondary education ==
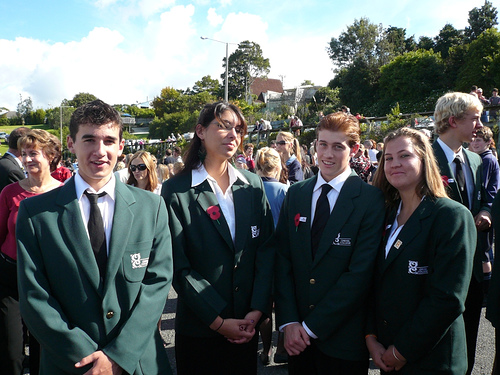
New Zealand college students at an Anzac Day parade, Auckland

All New Zealand citizens, and those entitled to reside in New Zealand indefinitely, are entitled to free primary and secondary schooling from their 5th birthday until the end of the calendar year following their 19th birthday. Education is compulsory between a student's 6th and 16th birthdays; however most students start primary school on (or shortly after) their 5th birthday, and the vast majority (around 84%) stay in school until at least their 17th birthday. In exceptional cases, 15-year-olds can apply for an early leaving exemption from the Ministry of Education (MOE). Disabled students with special educational needs can attend day specialist schools until the end of the calendar year they turn 21.

Families wishing to home-school their children can apply for an exemption. To get an exemption from enrolment at a registered school, they must satisfy the Secretary of Education that their child will be taught "as regularly and as well as in a registered school".

=== School years and grades ===
The New Zealand school year runs from late January to mid-December. Schools open for the year between Auckland Anniversary Day (the Monday closest to 29 January) and Waitangi Day (6 February) and close no later than 20 December. The year is divided into four terms, with two-week breaks in between. These breaks are in April (usually incorporating Easter), July, and September/October.

New Zealand primary and secondary schooling has 13 year levels, numbered 1 through 13. Primary education lasts eight years (Years 1–8). The last two years of primary education (Years 7 and 8) are known as intermediate. Depending on the area, Years 7 and 8 may be taken at a primary school (termed a full primary school, in contrast to a Year 1–6 contributing primary school), at a Year 7–13 secondary school, or at a separate intermediate school. Students generally transition to secondary education at age 12–13. Secondary education, also known as high school or college, lasts five years (Years 9–13).

Year Level	Age at 1 April
Year 1	5
Year 2	6
Year 3	7
Year 4	8
Year 5	9
Year 6	10
Year 7	11
Year 8	12
Year 9	13
Year 10	14
Year 11	15
Year 12	16
Year 13	17

=== Curriculum and qualifications ===
All state and state integrated schools follow the national curriculum: The New Zealand Curriculum (NZC) for English-medium schools and Te Marautanga o Aotearoa (TMoA) for Māori-medium schools. Private schools do not need to follow the national curriculum, but must have a curriculum that is at least equivalent to NZC or TMoA.

Both the NZC and TMoA outline eight learning areas: English (NZC) or Māori (TMoA), mathematics and statistics, the arts, health and physical education, learning languages, science, social sciences, and technology. All areas except learning languages are compulsory until Year 10. While not compulsory, learning languages is recommended for students between Years 7 and 10. Parents can request their child be excluded from the sexuality education portion of the health and physical education curriculum, provided they notify the school principal in writing.

From year 11 onwards, most students work toward the National Certificate of Educational Achievement (NCEA). Some schools offer Cambridge International Examinations (CIE) or the International Baccalaureate (IB) alongside NCEA. Senior students have greater choice in subjects, though Mathematics is often compulsory in Year 11 and English or Māori in Years 11 and 12 to meet the numeracy and literacy requirements for University Entrance.

New Zealand is undergoing a staged transition in its senior secondary curriculum and qualification system. NCEA remains the national senior secondary qualification in 2026, but the transition to a new system begins in 2028 with a Foundational Award for Year 11. The New Zealand Certificate of Education (NZCE) is scheduled to begin for Year 12 students in 2029, followed by the New Zealand Advanced Certificate of Education (NZACE) for Year 13 students in 2030. The qualification changes are being introduced alongside an updated senior secondary curriculum, which is being phased in from 2028.

=== Types of schools by funding ===
New Zealand has three types of schools: state schools, which are government owned and funded; state integrated schools, which are government funded but may charge compulsory fees; and private schools, with set annual fees.

==== State schools ====
State schools, or public schools, are government funded and operated, and are free to New Zealand citizens and permanent residents. Students and parents however are expected to pay for stationery, uniforms, textbooks and school trips. Schools may ask for donations to supplement their government operational funding. While it is completely voluntary to pay the donation, some schools have been reported coercing parents into paying the donation by withholding school reports and not allowing students on trips for non-payment; some schools, especially those in affluent areas, request donations in excess of $1000 per year. Each state school is governed by an elected Board of Trustees, consisting of the school principal, a number of trustees (usually 5) elected by the parents of the students, one staff trustee elected by the school staff, and in secondary schools, one student trustee elected by the students. State schools follow the national curriculum, and are required to remain secular. Around 85% of students are enrolled in state schools.

==== State-integrated schools ====
State-integrated schools are former private schools which have chosen to integrate into the state education system, becoming state schools but retaining their "special character": being run by a religious community or a specialist group. They were established in 1975 after the near-collapse of the then-private Catholic school system, which had run into financial difficulties and threatened to overwhelm the state school system were they to close. The majority of state-integrated schools are Catholic, but other Christian denominations, religions and educational philosophies are also represented. The private school owners stay on as proprietors, and sit on the school's board of trustees to ensure the special character is maintained. State-integrated schools charge "attendance dues" to parents to cover the costs of the still privately owned land and buildings, and to pay off any debts accrued by the school prior to integration. Typical attendance dues range between $240 and $740 per year for Catholic schools, and between $1,150 and $2,300 per year for non-Catholic state-integrated schools. Around 10% of students are enrolled in state-integrated schools.

==== Private schools ====
Private schools receive less funding from the government and rely heavily on tuition fees paid by students' parents to operate, typically around NZ$20,000 per year. In 2010, 4% of school-age children attended private schools.

==== Alternative schooling ====
Charter schools in New Zealand were state-funded schools which operated outside of the normal state system, and did not follow the national curriculum. They began in 2014 with five small schools. Charter schools did not have to operate with any registered or trained teachers; teachers were not required to have current practicing certificates. Beginning in 2017 and culminating in September 2018 all former charter schools had become state-integrated schools.

Parents may home-school their own children, if they can prove that their child will be "taught at least as regularly and as well as in a registered school", and receive an annual grant to help with costs, including services from The Correspondence School. The percentage of children home-schooled is well under 2% even in the Nelson region, the area where the concept is most popular.

=== Types of schools by years ===
While there is overlap in some schools, primary school traditionally runs from Year 1 to Year 8 and secondary school from Year 9 to Year 13. Depending on the area, Years 7 and 8 may be taken either at a "full" primary school (in contrast to a Year 1–6 "contributing" primary school), a separate intermediate school, or at a Year 7–13 secondary school. Schools catering for both primary school and secondary school students (Years 1 to 13) are common among private schools, and also state schools in areas where the population does not justify separate primary and secondary schools (the latter are termed "area schools").

The main six types of schools are:

- Contributing primary school: Years 1–6 (ages 5–11; previously 4 in some cases). There are no private contributing primaries.
- Full primary school: Years 1–8 (ages 5–13). Common among integrated and private schools.
- Intermediate school: Years 7–8 (ages 10–13). Only two non-state intermediate schools exist.
- Secondary school: Years 9–13 (ages 13–18).
- Year 7–13 secondary school or Secondary school with intermediate: Years 7–13 (ages 10–18). Common among integrated and private schools, and state schools in Invercargill and South Island provincial areas.
- Composite school or Area school: Years 1–13 (ages 5–18). Common among integrated and private schools.

There are some schools that fall outside the traditional year groupings. All of the following types of schools are rare, with less than ten of each type existing.

- Middle school: Years 7–10 (ages 10–15). Only six exist. They are Cambridge Middle School, Te Au o Tamatea St Andrews Middle School, Mission Heights Junior College, South Auckland Middle School, Middle School West Auckland.
- Senior school: Years 11–13 (ages 14–18). Only four exist (Albany Senior High School in Auckland, Auckland International College in Auckland, Rototuna Senior High School in Hamilton and Ormiston Senior College in Auckland).

In addition, there are three other types of schools defined by the Ministry of Education:

- Correspondence school: Preschool – Year 13 (Preschool – age 19). Serves distance education, for those in remote areas or for individual subjects not offered by a school. The only school of this type is the national correspondence school: Te Aho o Te Kura Pounamu.
- Special school: Preschool – age 21. Serves special education to those with intellectual impairments, visual or hearing impairments, or learning and social difficulties, who receive Ongoing Resourcing Scheme (ORS) funding.
- Teen parent unit: Years 9–15 (age 12–19). Serves teenage parents in continuing secondary school education. They are under the jurisdiction of a hosting secondary school, but are largely autonomous.

=== Types of school by function ===
- Normal schools — designated as major practicum sites for trainee teachers
- Model schools

=== State school enrolment schemes ===
Geographically based state school enrolment schemes were abolished in 1991 by the Fourth National Government and the Education Amendment Act 1991. Although this greatly opened up the choice of schools for students, it had undesirable consequences. Popular high-decile schools experienced large roll growths, while less popular low-decile school experienced roll declines. Schools could operate a roll limit if there was a risk of overcrowding, but enrolments under this scheme were on a "first come, first served" basis, potentially excluding local students.

The Education Amendment Act 2000, enacted by the Fifth Labour Government, partially solved this problem by putting in place a new "system for determining enrolment of students in circumstances where a school has reached its roll capacity and needs to avoid overcrowding." Schools which operate enrolment schemes have a geographically defined "home zone". Residence in this zone, or in the school's boarding house (if it has one) gives right of entry to the School. Students who live outside the school's home zone can be admitted, if there are places available, in the following order of priority: special programmes; siblings of currently enrolled students; siblings of past students; children of past students; children of board employees and staff; all other students. If there are more applications than available places then selection must be through a randomly drawn ballot. The system is complicated by some state schools having boarding facilities for students living beyond the school's zone. Typically these students live in isolated farming regions in New Zealand, or their parents may live or work partly overseas. Many secondary schools offer limited scholarships to their boarding establishment to attract talented students in imitation of private school practice.

As of September 2010, 700 of New Zealand's 2550 primary and secondary schools operate an enrolment scheme, while the remaining 1850 schools are "open enrolment", meaning any student can enrol in the school without rejection. Enrolment schemes mostly exist in major towns and cities where school density is high and school choice is active; they rarely exist for primary schools in rural areas and secondary schools outside the major towns and cities, where school density is low and school choice is limited by the distance to the nearest alternative school.

Critics have suggested that the system is fundamentally unfair as it restricts the choice for parents to choose schools and schools to choose their students although it does allow all students living in the community to have entry, as of right, regardless of their academic or social profile. In addition, there is evidence that property values surrounding some more desirable schools become inflated, thus restricting the ability of lower socio-economic groups to purchase a house in the zone. Some parents have purposely flouted zone boundaries by giving false addresses, such as that of a business they own in the zone, or by renting homes in the zone only through the enrolment process and moving out before the student commences school. Schools are now requesting rates invoices, tenancy agreements, or power and telephone bills from parents to prove their residential address, Some schools have gone as far as requiring parents to make a statutory declaration before a Justice of the Peace or similar that they live in the school zone, which makes it impossible for a parent to cheat the zone without also committing a criminal offence (making a false statutory declaration is punishable by up to three years' imprisonment).

=== Māori language in education ===
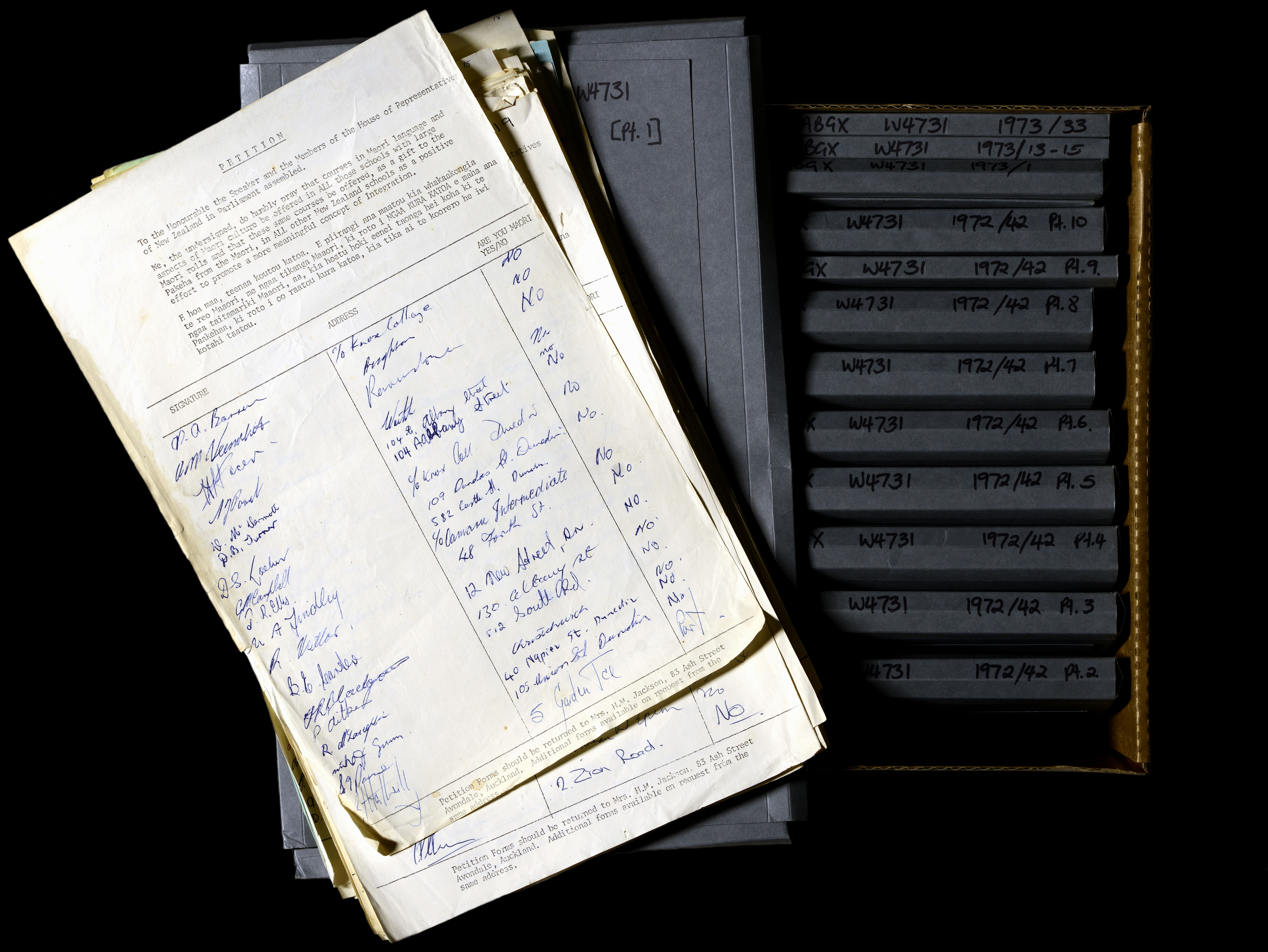
In 1972 Ngā Tamatoa collected this petition of over 30,000 signatures. It called for the government to offer Māori language in schools, as a gift from Māori to Pākehā. It was an important public act which included the delivery of the petition to Parliament on 14 September 1972.

While English is the dominant language of education throughout New Zealand, in recent years there have been ongoing efforts to raise the availability of Māori language education in New Zealand as one of New Zealand's three official languages.

Prior to the arrival of the first European settlers in what would become New Zealand, traditional educational systems in Māori society (a ritual transfer of knowledge for most Māori, and the more formal whare wānanga—“house of learning”—model primarily for those of chiefly lineage) were naturally conducted through the medium of the Māori language.

In 1816, the first mission school was opened to teach the Māori in the Bay of Islands. Here too, instruction was conducted primarily in the Māori language. Though English-medium education would have also been available for children of European settlers from nearly their first arrival, ethnic Māori continued to learn primarily through the medium of the Māori language for many years. It was not until the Native Schools Act was passed in 1867 that a systematic government preference was articulated for the English language as a medium of instruction for Māori children. And even with the passage of the act, the English-language provision was not rigorously enforced until 1900.

Starting in 1903, a government policy to discourage the use of the Māori language in playgrounds was enacted. In the early 1930s the director of Education blocked an initiative by the New Zealand Federation of Teachers to have the Māori language added to the curriculum. Though not the only factor, the ban on the Māori language in education contributed to the widespread loss of Māori-language ability. By 1960 the number of Māori who could speak the language had fallen to 25% from 95% in 1900.

Focus on falling Māori academic achievement in the 1960s coupled with the loss of the language, led to heavy lobbying by Ngā Tamatoa and the Te Reo Māori Society in the 1970s for the introduction of the language into the schools. This was accompanied by the establishment of Māori Studies programs in each of the Teacher Colleges by 1973. The 1980s then marked a pivotal decade in the revival of Māori-medium education, with the establishment of the first kōhanga reo (“language nest” – essentially a total immersion Māori-medium pre-school and kindergarten) in 1981, the first kura kaupapa (established at Hoani Waititi Marae, West Auckland) in 1985, a finding by the Waitangi Tribunal that the Māori language is guaranteed protection under Article II of the Treaty of Waitangi in 1986, and the passage of the Māori Language Act in 1987, recognising Māori as an official language.

Under New Zealand's current education laws, Māori language education is available in many locations throughout the country, both as a subject in a normal English-medium school as well as through immersion in a Māori-medium school set up under Section 155 (s155) or Section 156 (s156) of the Education Act 1990. The full immersion schools are commonly referred to as Kura Kaupapa Māori. Though enrolment numbers in Māori language programs have remained relatively stable in the last 5 years, the raw total as well as the percentage of students enrolled fell from 2004.

The definitions provided by the New Zealand Ministry of Education are as follows:

Māori Medium: Māori Medium includes students who are taught the curriculum in the Māori language for at least 51 percent of the time (Māori Language Immersion levels 1–2).

Māori Language in English Medium: Māori Language in English Medium includes students who are learning the Māori language as a language subject, or who are taught the curriculum in the Māori language for up to 50 percent of the time (Māori Language Immersion levels 3–5).

No Māori Language in Education: No Māori Language in Education includes those students who are only introduced to the Māori language via Taha Māori, i.e. simple words, greetings or songs in Māori (Māori Immersion Level 6), and students who are not involved in Māori language education at any level.

	Māori Medium			Māori Language in English Medium			No Māori Language in Education			Total
	Enrolment July 2012	% Enrolled	Change from July 2004	Enrolment July 2012	% Enrolled	Change from July 2004	Enrolment July 2012	% Enrolled	Change from July 2004	Enrolment July 2012
Māori students	16,353	9.45%	–7.26%	52,655	30.43%	–5.81%	104,003	60.11%	19.27%	173,011
Non-Māori students	439	0.07%	43.00%	88,290	15.04%	–4.24%	498,220	84.88%	–2.58%	586,949
All students	16,792	2.21%	–6.40%	140,945	18.55%	–4.83%	602,223	79.24%	0.60%	759,960

Information taken from Education Counts (accessed 22 May 2013)

=== Māori education ===
In 2021 Education Review Office released a report called Te Kura Huanui with the findings indicating Māori children who were enrolled in the Māori language schools of kōhanga and kura kaupapa excelling. In 2022 the statistics in mainstream schooling for Māori students were that 35% left with NCEA level 3, compared to 58% at a kura kaupapa.

Revitalising Māori education has not meant closing down Pākehā schools but instead means offering an alternative approach which is designed from top-to-bottom by Māori, to serve Māori. This system has shown us that by deploying a by Māori-for-Māori approach, better outcomes can be achieved for all New Zealanders. (Te Huia Bill Hamilton)

=== Pacific education ===
A 2003 study by Telesia Kelevite and Henk Hoogland at the Waikato Institute of Technology explored Pacific students' experiences of tertiary education through interviews with students and staff. It found that many Pacific students struggled to succeed in their studies due to cultural, economic, academic and institutional pressures. These pressures included family and community obligations, unfamiliar teaching styles, and limited Pacific representation in the education sector. Participants said that having someone to turn to, such as Pacific staff or family, made a big difference to students' success. In response, the institute introduced a Pasifika support coordinator, consultation with Pacific communities and a Māori and Pasifika learning centre. The authors concluded that clear communication between students and staff was central to Pacific students' success and called for further research into how well these supports work.

Researcher Anna Pasikale noted in 2001 that the approach to Pacific education in New Zealand often followed a deficit mindset. Pasikale instead identified three factors that impacted Pacific students' "educational success," which were: class sizes, quality teachers, and student-focused teaching strategies, with strategies being least likely to be focused on.

=== School times ===
The school day starts anywhere from 8:00–9:00 am and finishes around 3:00 pm. The school year starts at the end of January and finishes in mid-December, with the six-week summer holidays making up the second half of December and most of January. The year is divided into four terms, each lasting around ten weeks with two-week breaks in between. Typically, term one lasts from late January to mid-April, term two from early May to early July, term three from late July to late September, and term four from early October to mid-December, but term dates may be adjusted because of major sporting events or viral outbreaks.

=== Manual training schools ===
In response to growing criticism that New Zealand's education system was too focused on academics and not providing practical skills to children the Liberal Government of New Zealand passed the Manual and Technical Elementary Instruction Act 1895 to establish classes that taught manual and technical skills to students as part of the curriculum. This was not very effective and five years later the Manual and Technical Instruction Act 1900 was passed which established grants for the education boards to establish manual training schools as a form of secondary education. Most secondary schools did not wish to change their curriculum as the prevailing belief amongst teachers was in support of academic education. Two years later the government passed an amendment in 1902 which allowed for independent manual and technical training schools.

Manual training schools initially taught for Standards 5 and 6 and taught woodwork and metalwork to boys and cookery, laundry, and sewing to girls. Following the creation of intermediate schools after the Second World War most of their functions were adopted into the curriculum and manual training schools began closing down or being integrated into other schools.

Manual and technical training is now a part of the curriculum of New Zealand.

== Tertiary education ==
Tertiary education in New Zealand is used to describe all aspects of post-school education and training. This ranges from informal non-assessed community courses in schools through to undergraduate degrees and advanced, research-based postgraduate degrees. Tertiary education is regulated within the New Zealand Qualifications Framework, a unified system of national qualifications in schools, vocational education and training.

== Funding ==
=== Primary and secondary ===
State and state integrated schools are allocated funding from the Government on a per-student basis to fund the running of the school. Smaller schools receive additional funding due to the added fixed costs of running them compared to larger schools, and schools also receive funding based on the school's socio-economic decile rating, with low-decile schools (i.e. those in poorer areas) receiving more funds. They may also receive funds from other activities, such as hiring out school facilities outside school hours to outside groups. Schools also ask for a voluntary donation from parents, informally known as "school fees", to cover extra expenses not covered by the government funding. This may range from $40 per child up to $800 per child in high decile state schools, to over $4000 in state integrated schools. The payment of this fee varies widely according to how parents perceive the school. Typically parents will also outlay $500–$1000 per year for uniforms, trips, social events, sporting equipment and stationery at state schools.

Most state integrated schools also charge "attendance dues", a compulsory fee paid to the school's proprietors to cover the cost of maintaining and upgrading school land and buildings. Unlike voluntary donations, attendance dues are not optional and parents are contractually and legally required to pay them, and schools can take action to collect these or cancel the enrolment of a student if they are not paid.

Private schools rely mainly on tuition fees paid to the school by the parents of the students, although some funding is provided by the government. As of 2013, private schools receives from the Government (exclusive of GST) $1013 for every Year 1 to 6 student, $1109 for every Year 7 and 8 student, $1420 for every Year 9 and 10 student, and $2156 for every Year 11 to 13 student. However, the government funding is more of a partial tax rebate, as the GST payable to the government on the tuition fees collected often exceeds the government funding received in turn.

Salaries and wages for teaching staff in state and state integrated schools are paid directly from the Ministry of Education to the employee, and are not paid out of a school's funding. The salaries are fixed nationwide, and are based on the teacher's qualifications, years of service and workload, with middle and senior management awarded extra pay through "units". In 1991, following the decentralisation of school administration (the "Tomorrow's Schools" reforms), there was an attempt to move the responsibilities of paying teachers' salaries from the ministry to each school's Board of Trustees, in which each board would receive a lump sum from the government for all costs, including the payment of salaries. Known as "Bulk Funding", the proposal met strong opposition from teachers and their unions, particularly the Post Primary Teachers' Association, and wildcat strike action occurred among teachers as some schools' boards of trustees gradually elected to move to the new system. Bulk Funding was eventually scrapped in July 2000.

Special needs students are entitled to Ongoing Resource Scheme (ORS) funding, which is used for facilitating the adaption of the curriculum to fit the student, funding of teacher aides and specialists, and procuring any special equipment required. There are three levels of funding based on the student's needs: very high, high or combined moderate. For example, a student who is totally blind or deaf is classified as very high needs, while a student who is partially sighted (6/36 or worse) or severely or profoundly deaf (71 dB loss or worse) is classified as high needs. ORS funding is permanent, so it continues until the student leaves school.

=== Tertiary education ===
Funding for tertiary education in New Zealand is through a combination of government subsidies and student fees. The government funds approved courses by a tuition grant based on the number of enrolled students in each course and the amount of study time each course requires. Courses are rated on an equivalent full-time Student (EFTS) basis. Students enrolled in courses can access Student Loans and Student Allowances to assist with fees and living costs.

Funding for Tertiary Institutions has been criticised recently due to high fees and funding not keeping pace with costs or inflation. Some also point out that high fees are leading to skills shortages in New Zealand as high costs discourage participation and graduating students seek well paying jobs off shore to pay for their student loans debts.

There are a number of types of providers which include both traditional and non-traditional providers for funding. The Skill New Zealand programme is an example of a community-focused programme that has been integrated into the tertiary system that provides funding to students. The programme is focused on supporting students who are Māori and Pacific. The Pacific branch of the programme offers funding to students towards a qualification and has a focus on Pacific values, such as equipping students with practical and cultural skills in areas such as leadership.

=== Students ===
Most tertiary education students rely on some form of state funding to pay for their tuition and living expenses. Mostly, students rely on state provided student loans and allowances. Secondary school students sitting the state run examinations are awarded scholarships, depending on their results, that assist in paying some tuition fees. Universities and other funders also provide scholarships or funding grants to promising students, though mostly at a postgraduate level. Some employers will also assist their employees to study (full-time or part-time) towards a qualification that is relevant to their work. People who receive state welfare benefits and are retraining, or returning to the workforce after raising children, may be eligible for supplementary assistance, however students already in full or part-time study are not eligible for most state welfare benefits. The enrolment of domestic students decreased by 3.5% in formal tertiary. However international students enrolment increased by 15%.

==== Student allowances ====
Student Allowances, which are non-refundable grants to students of limited means, are means tested and the weekly amount granted depends on residential and citizenship qualifications, age, location, marital status, dependent children as well as personal, spousal or parental income. The allowance is intended for living expenses, so most students receiving an allowance will still need a student loan to pay for their tuition fees.

==== Student loans ====
The Student Loan Scheme is available to all New Zealand citizens and permanent residents. It covers course fees, course related expenses, and can also provide a weekly living allowance for full-time students. The loan must be repaid at a rate dependent on income and repayments are normally recovered via the income tax system by wage deductions. Low income earners and students in full-time study can have the interest on their loans written off.

On 26 July 2005, the Labour Party announced that they would abolish interest on Student Loans, if re-elected at the September election, which they were. From April 2006, the interest component on Student Loans was abolished for students who live in New Zealand. This has eased pressure on the government from current students. However, it caused resentment from past students many of whom have accumulated large interests amounts in the years 1992–2006.

== Educational standards in New Zealand ==
In 1995 New Zealand students finished 18th out of 24 countries on an international survey, Trends in International Mathematics and Science Study (TIMSS). There was considerable public concern so the Government created a taskforce to address the problem. In 2001, the Ministry introduced the Numeracy Development Project, which was supposed to lift student performance. Instead, the new teaching methods appear to have "confused teachers, children and parents by presenting multiple alternative problem-solving strategies but neglecting basic knowledge" and over the next few years New Zealand's rating dropped even further.

In December 2012, the latest TIMSS survey found New Zealand 9-year-olds ranked 34th out of 53 countries — and were bottom equal among developed nations. Almost half could not add 218 and 191 compared to 73% internationally. Ministry of Education figures show the number of 12-year-olds who were able to answer simple multiplication questions correctly dropped from "47% in 2001 — the year new maths teaching methods were introduced — to 37% in 2009". The problem flows on to high schools, where "there are still students who have difficulty with the very basics such as knowledge about whole numbers and decimals".

Sir Vaughan Jones, New Zealand's foremost mathematician, is concerned about the way maths is now taught in New Zealand arguing that children need to learn how to multiply and add and really understand those processes before moving on. Jones said children "need to know basic arithmetic before they try to start problem solving".

In December 2012 a broader ranking process put New Zealand eighth out of 40 countries — seemingly giving the country one of the top education systems in the world. This ranking came from The Learning Curve global education report, published by education firm Pearson. The report assesses performance rates of pupils in reading, writing and maths and is based on data from the Organisation for Economic Co-operation and Development. However, the validity of Pearsons' testing process for students has been questioned following the discovery of numerous errors in its tests and controversy regarding a question about a talking pineapple.

On a more general note, the Pearson report said the quality of teaching was key factor in a successful education system but also highlighted the importance of an underlying culture focused on children's learning. The report noted that Hong Kong, Japan and Singapore, which were all ahead of New Zealand, had societies "where education and learning was of the greatest importance and where parents were very much involved with their children's education".

=== Māori and Pacific Island standards ===
According to former Education Minister Hekia Parata, New Zealand needs to raise the academic achievement of its Māori and Pacific Island students to match those of Pākehā students. In 2013, she said that the PISA international standard showed Pākehā were ranked second in the world, Māori were 34th equal and Pacific students were ranked 44th. In the lead up to PISA, one third of students admitted to having missed classes prior to their tests, leading to lower grades in specific areas (science for example) compared to those who did not miss any classes.

== School bullying ==
Bullying is a widespread issue in New Zealand schools. In 2007, one in five New Zealand high school students reported being cyber-bullied. In regard to physical bullying, an international study in 2009 found New Zealand had the second highest incidence of bullying out of the 40 countries surveyed.

In 2009, the Ombudsman launched an investigation into school bullying and violence after serious incidents at Hutt Valley High School in Lower Hutt, which included students being dragged to the ground, sexually assaulted, a student "being beaten unconscious and a student being burnt with a lighter". The Ombudsman's report recommended schools' guidelines be amended to make anti-bullying programmes compulsory in schools. Post Primary Teachers' Association president Robin Duff said the report illustrated a systemic failure by the Ministry of Education to help schools deal with bullying.

The Government responded by putting $60 million into a Positive Behaviour for Learning plan but the results were less than satisfactory. In March 2013, Secondary Principals Association president Patrick Walsh asked the Ministry to "urgently draft a comprehensive bullying policy for schools, after being surprised to find it did not have one." Mr Walsh believes that since schools are supposed to be self-managing, each school has to "work it out" for themselves which "would mean that all 2500 schools all have to reinvent the wheel".

== See also ==
- Charter schools in New Zealand
- History of education in New Zealand
- Homeschooling in New Zealand
- Environmental education in New Zealand
- National Certificate of Educational Achievement
- New Zealand Qualifications Authority
- Student Job Search
