= Electoral history of Keith Holyoake =

List of elections featuring Keith Holyoake as a candidate

This is a summary of the electoral history of Keith Holyoake, Prime Minister of New Zealand (1957, 1960–72), Leader of the National Party (1957–72), and Member of Parliament for Motueka (1932–38) then Pahiatua (1943–77).

== Parliamentary elections ==
=== 1931 election ===
1931 general election: Motueka
Party	Candidate	Votes	%	±%
Independent	George Black	4,180	53.30	−0.75
Reform	Keith Holyoake	3,663	46.70	
Majority		517	6.59	−1.50
Informal votes		37	0.47	−0.21
Turnout		7,880	88.51	−1.71
Registered electors		8,903		

=== 1932 by-election ===
1932 Motueka by-election
Party	Candidate	Votes	%	±%
Reform	Keith Holyoake	3,887	49.04	+2.34
Labour	Paddy Webb	3,210	40.50	
Liberal–Labour	Roderick McKenzie	829	10.46	
Majority		677	8.54	+1.95
Turnout		7,926	89.03	+0.52
Registered electors		8,903		
Reform gain from Independent		Swing		

=== 1935 election ===
1935 general election: Motueka
Party	Candidate	Votes	%	±%
Reform	Keith Holyoake	5,115	51.40	+2.36
Labour	Rubert York	4,835	48.59	
Informal votes		86	0.86	
Majority		280	2.81	−5.73
Turnout		9,950	91.94	+2.91
Registered electors		10,822		

=== 1938 election ===
1938 general election: Motueka
Party	Candidate	Votes	%	±%
Labour	Jerry Skinner	5,142	54.16	
National	Keith Holyoake	4,272	44.99	−6.41
Informal votes		80	0.84	−0.02
Majority		870	9.16	
Turnout		9,494	94.00	+2.06
Registered electors		10,099		

=== 1943 election ===
1943 general election: Pahiatua
Party	Candidate	Votes	%	±%
National	Keith Holyoake	5,705	57.93	
Labour	George Anders Hansen	3,880	39.39	
Democratic Labour	Edward Ellis	190	1.92	
Informal votes		73	0.74	
Majority		1,825	18.53	
Turnout		9,848	95.62	
Registered electors		10,299		

=== 1946 election ===
1946 general election: Pahiatua
Party	Candidate	Votes	%	±%
National	Keith Holyoake	8,422	64.06	+6.13
Labour	Otto Ernest Niederer	4,725	35.94	
Majority		3,697	28.12	+9.59
Turnout		13,147	94.08	+1.54
Registered electors		13,973		

=== 1949 election ===
1949 general election: Pahiatua
Party	Candidate	Votes	%	±%
National	Keith Holyoake	8,663	67.57	+3.51
Labour	George Patrick O'Leary	4,156	32.43	
Majority		4,507	35.15	−7.03
Turnout		12,819	92.26	−1.82
Registered electors		13,894		

=== 1951 election ===
1951 general election: Pahiatua
Party	Candidate	Votes	%	±%
National	Keith Holyoake	8,490	60.89	−6.68
Labour	Owen Jones	3,892	27.91	
Majority		4,598	32.97	−2.18
Turnout		12,382	88.81	−3.45
Registered electors		13,942		

=== 1954 election ===
1954 general election: Pahiatua
Party	Candidate	Votes	%	±%
National	Keith Holyoake	7,293	61.81	+0.92
Labour	Ronald Bell	3,774	31.98	
Social Credit	Maurice Mulloy Whimp	731	6.19	
Majority		3,519	29.82	−3.15
Turnout		11,798	90.73	+1.92
Registered electors		13,003		

=== 1957 election ===
1957 general election: Pahiatua
Party	Candidate	Votes	%	±%
National	Keith Holyoake	8,075	62.03	+0.22
Labour	William Erle Rose	4,055	31.15	
Social Credit	Roy Gunn	887	6.81	
Majority		4,020	30.88	+1.06
Turnout		13,017	92.57	1.84
Registered electors		14,061		

=== 1960 election ===
1960 general election: Pahiatua
Party	Candidate	Votes	%	±%
National	Keith Holyoake	8,111	64.44	+2.41
Labour	Kingsley McKane	3,177	25.24	
Social Credit	Percival John Dempsey	1,298	10.31	
Majority		4,934	39.20	+8.32
Turnout		12,586	90.18	−2.39
Registered electors		13,955		

=== 1963 election ===
1963 general election: Pahiatua
Party	Candidate	Votes	%	±%
National	Keith Holyoake	9,039	65.70	+1.26
Labour	Ernie Hemmingsen	3,306	24.03	
Social Credit	Oliver Marks	1,411	10.25	
Majority		5,733	41.67	+2.47
Turnout		13,756	88.92	−1.26
Registered electors		15,469		

=== 1966 election ===
1966 general election: Pahiatua
Party	Candidate	Votes	%	±%
National	Keith Holyoake	7,914	61.75	−3.95
Labour	F M O'Brien	2,623	20.46	
Social Credit	J H Morrow	2,207	17.22	
Independent	R E Cheer	71	0.55	
Majority		5,291	41.28	−0.39
Turnout		12,815	85.89	−3.03
Registered electors		14,919		

=== 1969 election ===
1969 general election: Pahiatua
Party	Candidate	Votes	%	±%
National	Keith Holyoake	9,010	62.26	+0.51
Labour	Trevor de Cleene	4,090	28.26	
Social Credit	Douglas Conway	1,131	7.81	
Country Party	C K R Farnsworth	240	1.65	
Majority		4,920	33.99	−7.29
Turnout		14,471	86.75	+0.86
Registered electors		16,681		

=== 1972 election ===
1972 general election: Pahiatua
Party	Candidate	Votes	%	±%
National	Keith Holyoake	8,825	60.11	−2.15
Labour	L J Cairns	4,466	30.42	
Social Credit	J H Morrow	1,022	6.96	
Liberal Reform	R E Cheer	253	1.72	
New Democratic	J W Duffy	115	0.78	
Majority		4,359	29.69	−4.30
Turnout		14,681	86.00	+0.75
Registered electors		17,069		

=== 1975 election ===
1975 general election: Pahiatua
Party	Candidate	Votes	%	±%
National	Keith Holyoake	10,423	64.19	+4.08
Labour	Paul Thornicroft	3,654	22.50	
Social Credit	Graeme Hislop	1,585	9.76	
Values	Peter McHugh	574	3.53	
Majority		6,769	41.69	+12.00
Turnout		16,236	84.61	−1.39
Registered electors		19,188		
