= Leonard A. Atkinson =

New Zealand public servant (1906–1998)

Leonard Allan Atkinson CMG

Chairman of the Public Service Commission, Chairman of the State Services Commission
- In office 1958–1966
- Prime Minister: Walter Nash, Keith Holyoake
- Preceded by: George T. Bolt
- Succeeded by: Adrian G. Rodda

Leonard Allan Atkinson CMG (6 December 1906 – 14 January 1998) was a Chairman of the Public Service Commission and Chairman of the State Services Commission in New Zealand. He served for eight consecutive years.

In the 1963 New Year Honours, Atkinson was appointed a Companion of the Order of St Michael and St George.
