= Ian G. Lythgoe =

Ian Lythgoe CB

Chairman of the State Services Commission
- In office 1971–1974
- Prime Minister: Keith Holyoake, Jack Marshall, Norman Kirk
- Preceded by: Adrian G. Rodda
- Succeeded by: Robin Williams

Personal details
- Born: Ian Gordon Lythgoe; 30 December 1914
- Died: 16 February 2000 (aged 85)

Ian Gordon Lythgoe CB (30 December 1914 – 16 February 2000) was a Chairman of the State Services Commission in New Zealand. He was an accountant.

In the 1975 New Year Honours, Lythgoe was appointed a Companion of the Order of the Bath.
