= Adrian G. Rodda =

New Zealand civil servant

Adrian G. Rodda CMG

Chairman of the State Services Commission
- In office 1967–1970
- Prime Minister: Keith Holyoake
- Preceded by: Leonard A. Atkinson
- Succeeded by: Ian G. Lythgoe

Adrian George Rodda CMG (11 March 1911 – 31 October 1997) was a senior New Zealand civil servant.

He was born in Wellington, and educated at Johnsonville School, Wellington College and Victoria University College.

Rodda's career began in the Inland Revenue Department (New Zealand) in 1928, and he was also in the Housing Construction Division. He was in the first Diploma of Public Administration group in 1940. He joined the Public Service Commission in 1946 as an inspector, and became Chairman of the Commission in 1967. In the 1969 Queen's Birthday Honours, Rodda was appointed a Companion of the Order of St Michael and St George.

Rodda died in Hutt Hospital, aged 86 years.
