= 1930 Birthday Honours (New Zealand) =

Awards list for New Zealand

The 1930 King's Birthday Honours in New Zealand, celebrating the official birthday of King George V, were appointments made by the King on the recommendation of the New Zealand government to various orders and honours to reward and highlight good works by New Zealanders. They were announced on 3 June 1930.

The recipients of honours are displayed here as they were styled before their new honour.

== Knight Bachelor ==
- Alfred Seymour Bankart MBE – of Auckland; chairman of the Auckland War Memorial Committee. For public and charitable services.
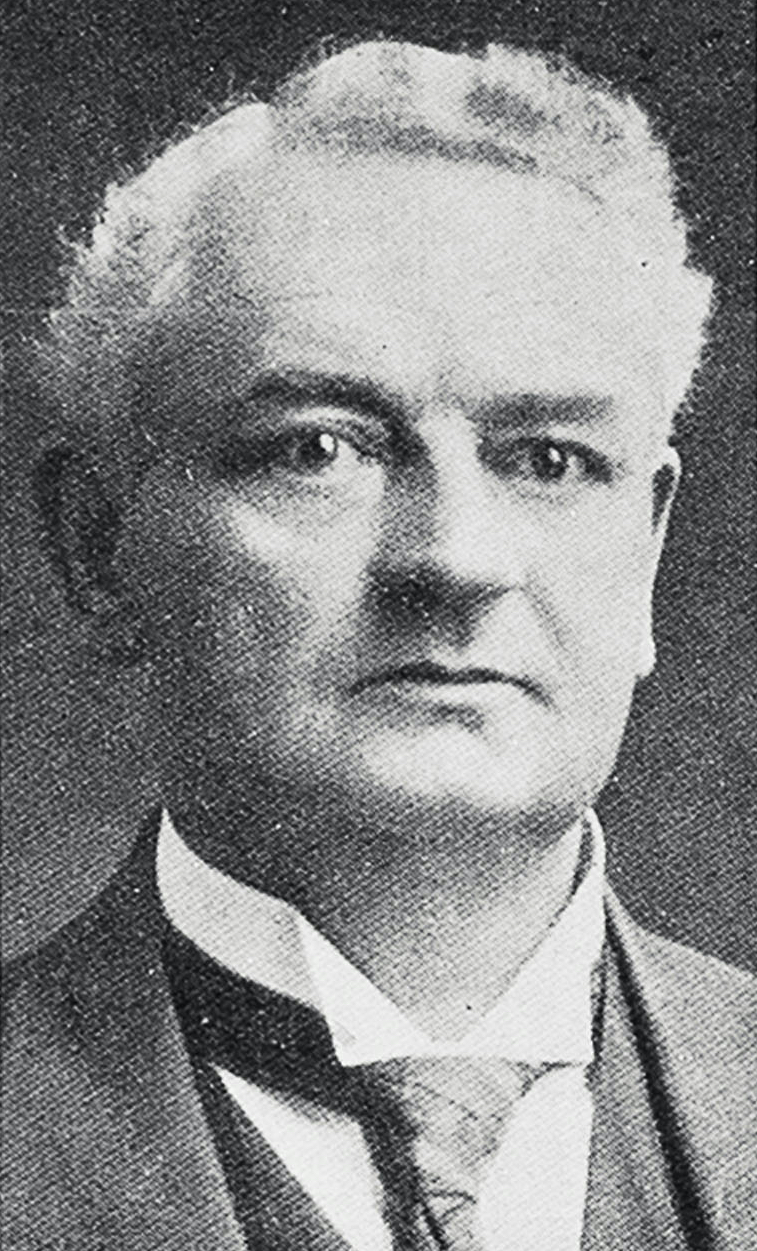
Sir Alfred Bankart

== Order of Saint Michael and Saint George ==
=== Knight Commander (KCMG) ===
- Thomas Mason Wilford KC – high commissioner for New Zealand in London.
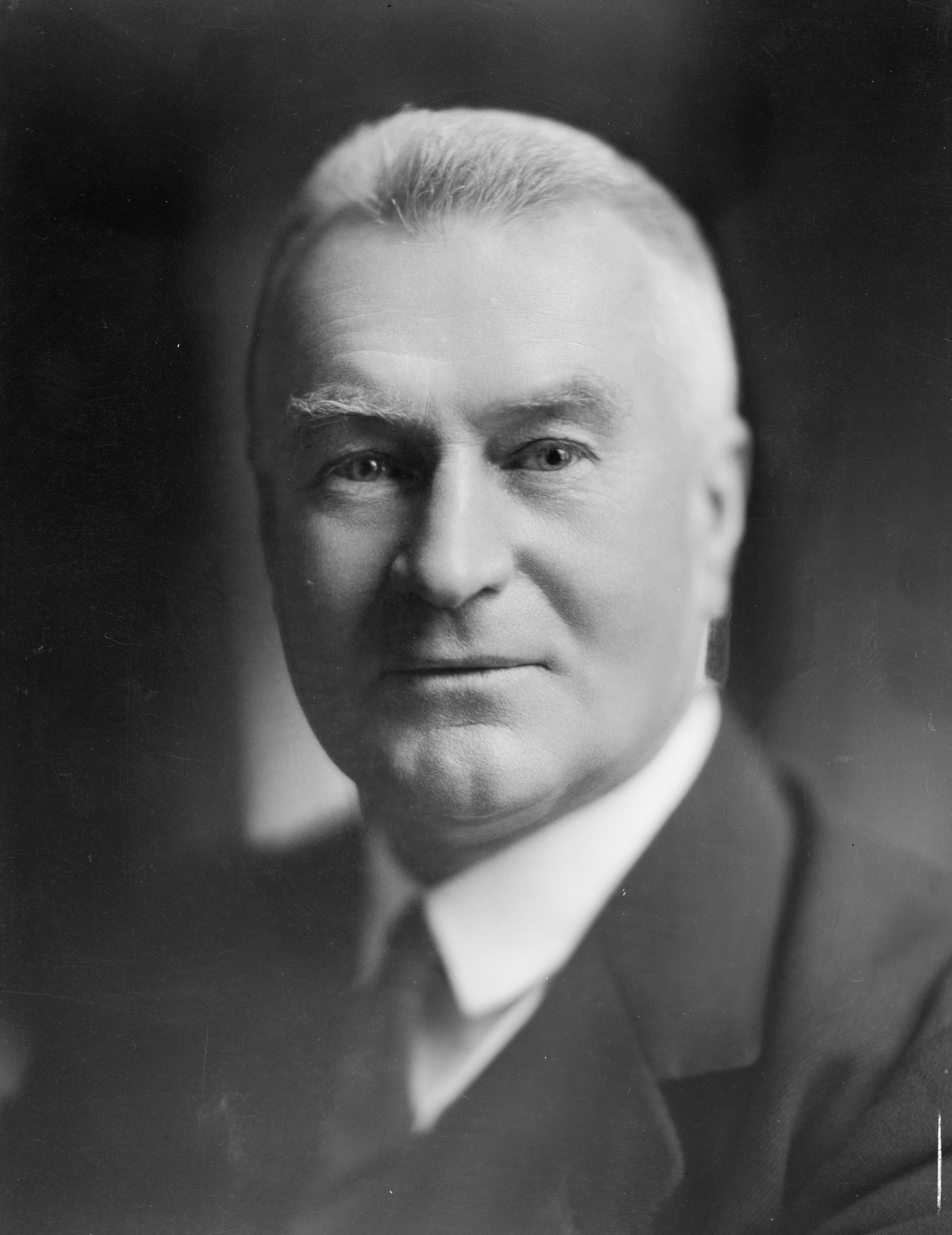
Sir Thomas Wilford

=== Companion (CMG) ===
- Robert Albert Anderson – of Invercargill. For public services.
- Paul Desiré Nestor Verschaffelt LLB – of Wellington; public service commissioner.
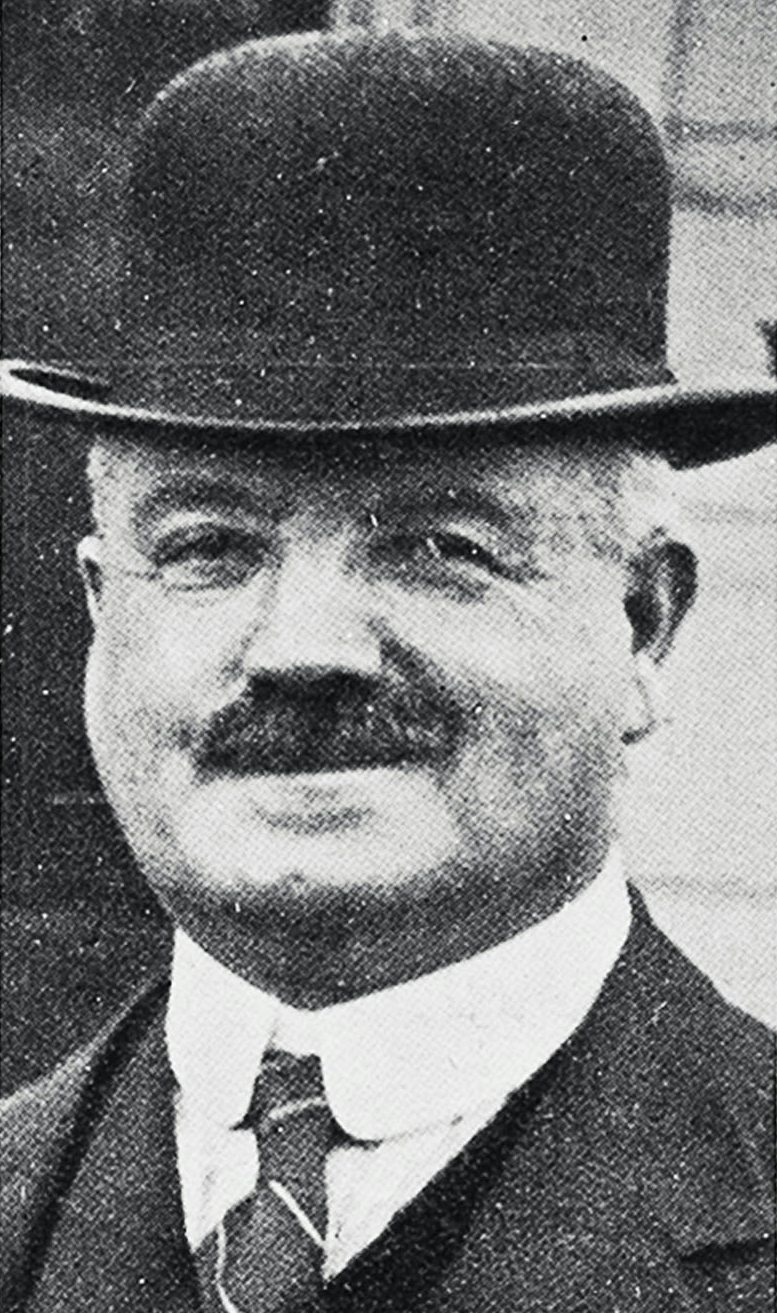
Robert Anderson

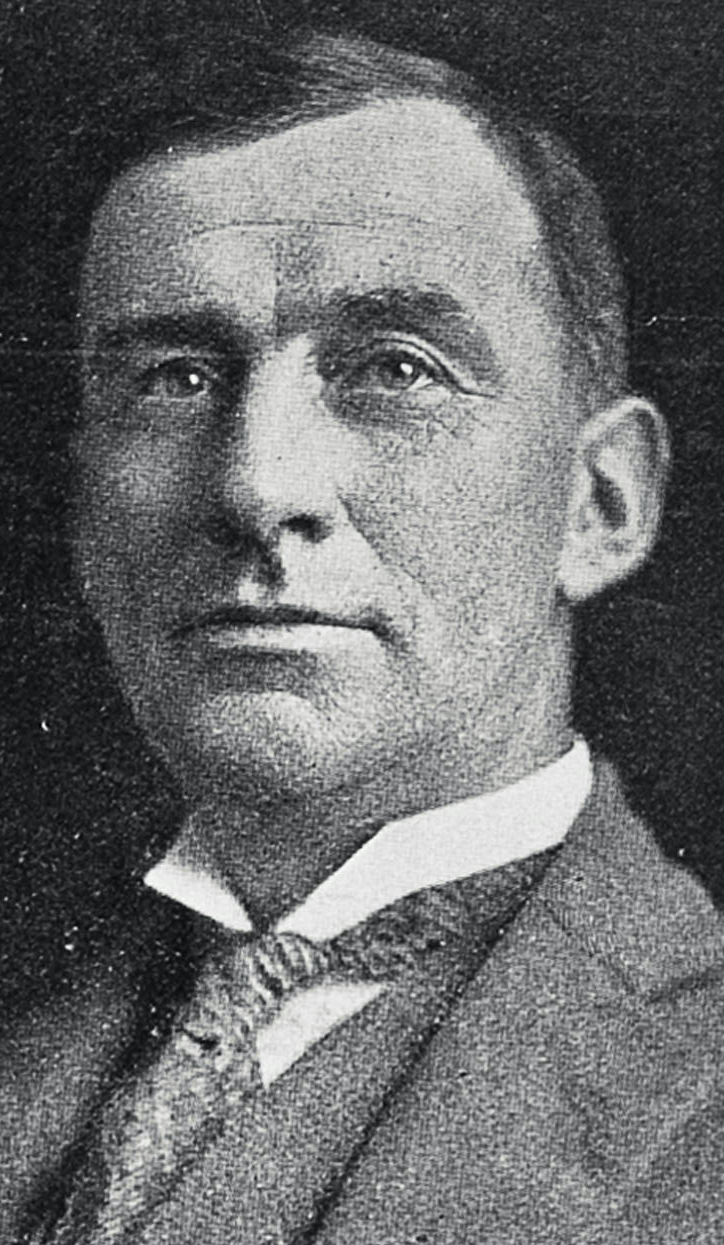
Paul Verschaffelt
