= George T. Bolt =

New Zealand public servant

George Bolt CMG

Chairman of the Public Service Commission
- In office 1953–1958
- Prime Minister: Sidney Holland, Keith Holyoake, Walter Nash
- Preceded by: Richard M. Campbell
- Succeeded by: Leonard A. Atkinson

Personal details
- Born: George Thomas Bolt; 16 June 1900 London, England
- Died: 20 March 1971 (aged 70) Wellington, New Zealand

George Thomas Bolt CMG (16 June 1900 – 20 March 1971) was a New Zealand public servant. He served as chairman of the Public Service Commission in New Zealand from 1953 to 1958. He was secretary of the Commission from 1936, and assistant commissioner from 1944.

Born in London, England, on 16 June 1900, Bolt was the son of George Henry and Emma Sarah Bolt. After the family migrated to New Zealand, he was educated at Wellington College, and qualified as an accountant. He joined the Public Service as a cadet in 1917. He died in Wellington Hospital, aged 70 years.

In 1953, Bolt was awarded the Queen Elizabeth II Coronation Medal. In the 1955 Queen's Birthday Honours, he was appointed a Companion of the Order of St Michael and St George, in recognition of his service as chairman of the Public Service Commission.
