= William R. Morris =

New Zealand public servant (1853–1936)

William R. Morris CMG ISO
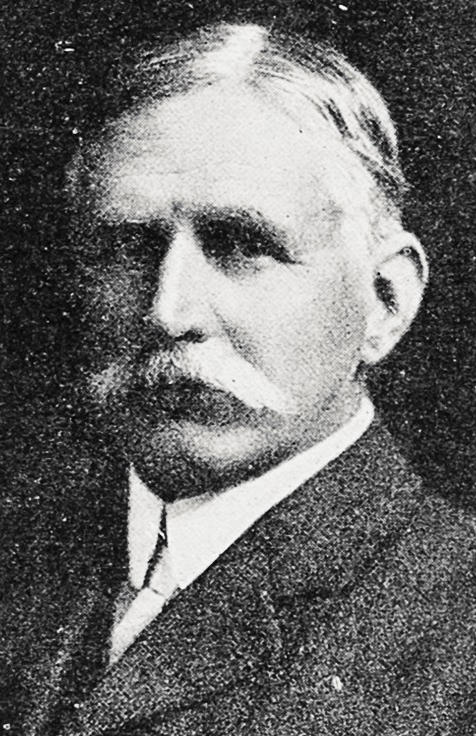

Public Service Commissioner
- In office 1920–1923
- Prime Minister: William Massey
- Preceded by: Donald Robertson
- Succeeded by: Paul Verschaffelt

Personal details
- Born: 1853 Dublin, Ireland
- Died: 1936 (aged 82–83)

William Russell Morris CMG ISO (1853–1936) was the second Public Service Commissioner in New Zealand. He was born in Dublin, and joined the New Zealand Post Office in 1875. He was appointed a Companion of the Imperial Service Order in the 1917 Birthday Honours, and made a Companion of the Order of St Michael and St George in the 1919 New Year Honours.

He married Edith Miranda Mountfoot (1857–1938) in 1877.
