= Dick Campbell (public servant) =

New Zealand economist (1897-1974)

Dick Campbell CMG
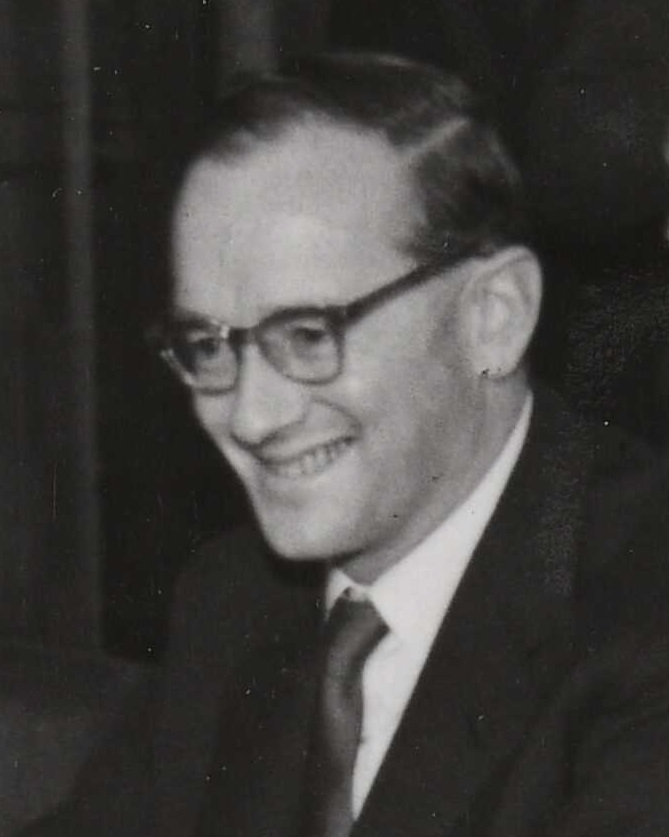

Chairman of the Public Service Commission
- In office 1 November 1946 – 31 March 1953
- Appointed by: Peter Fraser
- Preceded by: John H. Boyes
- Succeeded by: George T. Bolt

High Commissioner from New Zealand to the United Kingdom Acting
- In office 1 April 1958 – 30 September 1958
- Preceded by: Clifton Webb
- Succeeded by: George Laking

Personal details
- Born: Richard Mitchelson Campbell; 28 August 1897 Whangārei, New Zealand
- Died: 17 November 1974 (aged 77) Edinburgh, Scotland

Richard Mitchelson Campbell CMG (28 August 1897 – 17 November 1974) was a New Zealand economist, civil servant (holding the position of Chairman of the Public Service Commissioner), and diplomat.

== Biography ==
Campbell was born at Whangārei in 1897 to Scottish parents. He attended Whangarei High School and in 1914 joined the public service working at the Department of Education. In February 1918 he enlisted in the army, only to be discharged a month later as mobilisation was being scaled back.

In 1935 he became an economic advisor at the New Zealand High Commission in London. There he managed New Zealand's negotiations over access to the British market for New Zealand meat. After accompanying finance minister Walter Nash to Britain and Europe, from 1940 to 1945 he had an unhappy period as Secretary of the New Zealand High Commission in London, as Campbell and the High Commissioner, ex-politician Bill Jordan disliked each other.

He served as Acting High Commissioner to the United Kingdom in 1958 following five years as the official secretary.

He was appointed a Companion of the Order of St Michael and St George in the 1953 Coronation Honours. He also received the Queen Elizabeth II Coronation Medal.

Campbell later lived in Eastbourne, East Sussex. He died on 17 November 1974 while visiting Edinburgh. He was survived by his wife, two daughters and son.

Diplomatic posts
Preceded by Clifton Webb	High Commissioner from New Zealand to the United Kingdom; 1958	Succeeded by George Laking
