= Helene Quilter =

New Zealand public servant (1953–2026)

Dame Helene Quilter DNZM QSO
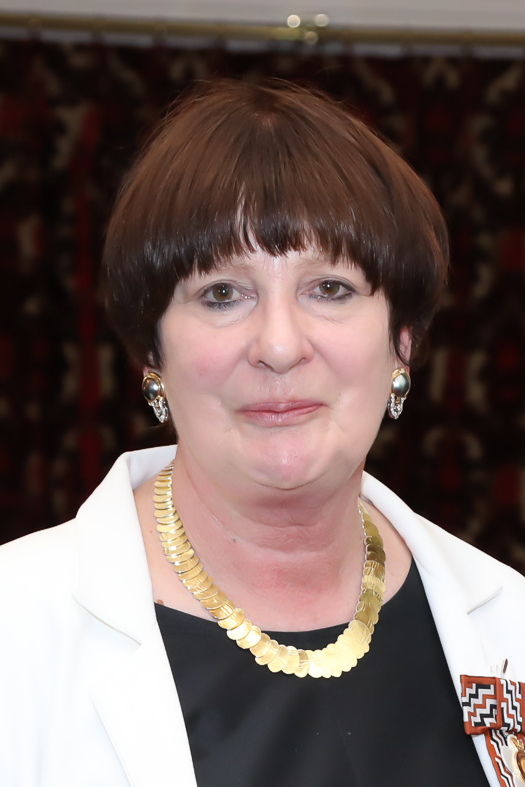
- Quilter in 2019
- Born: Helene Elizabeth Syben; 1 October 1953; London, England
- Died: 24 July 2026 (aged 72); Wellington, New Zealand
- Occupation: Public servant
- Employers: Department of Social Welfare; Ministry of Social Development; Ministry of Defence; State Services Commission

Dame Helene Elizabeth Quilter DNZM QSO (née Syben; 1 October 1953 – 23 July 2026) was a New Zealand public servant. In 2019, she was appointed a Companion of the Queen's Service Order for services to the State, and in 2023 she was appointed Dame Companion of the New Zealand Order of Merit, for services to the public service and the arts.

== Early life and education ==
Quilter was born Helene Elizabeth Syben on 1 October 1953, and migrated to New Zealand with her family as a child. She was educated at Baradene College of the Sacred Heart in Auckland, where she was a boarder from 1966 to 1971. She later earned a Master of Strategic Studies degree from Victoria University of Wellington, graduating in 2005.

== Career ==
Quilter began her public service career at the Department of Social Welfare, eventually rising to senior leadership positions, including deputy chief executive of the renamed Ministry of Social Development.

She was the deputy commissioner at the State Services Commission from 2007 to 2012, where she was responsible for the first five-year strategic plan for the Ministry of Social Development. She worked on improving systems for governance and risk assessments, and led the implementation of the Defence White Paper 2010.

Quilter served as the secretary of defence and chief executive of the Ministry of Defence from 2012 to 2019. Whilst in office, she led a reform of the defence capability management system. She was reappointed deputy public service commissioner, a position she retired from in 2023 after a 45-year career.

She was described as "a driver of modernisation and diversity while at the centre of some of New Zealand’s core public service organisations". In her Public Service Commission role she was responsible for achieving greater diversity and a 50/50 gender split for a group of thirty chief executives. She also conducted a review into the workplace culture at Fire and Emergency New Zealand, and supported the public service commissioner through the COVID-19 response. Quilter cited Margaret Bazley as her role model.

Quilter led and served on a number of boards, including the New Zealand School of Dance. In the 1990s, after running out of space at home, she established a significant modern art collection, the Quilter Collection, which was on display for fifteen years at the Govett-Brewster Art Gallery. The collection included works by Bill Hammond, Séraphine Pick and Tony de Lautour, among others. Although she retained 30 works from the collection, Quilter later auctioned 47 others in order to fund an interest in 17th- and 18th-century religious art, and New Zealand artist Louise Greig.

Quilter died in Wellington on 23 July 2026, at the age of 72.

== Honours and awards ==
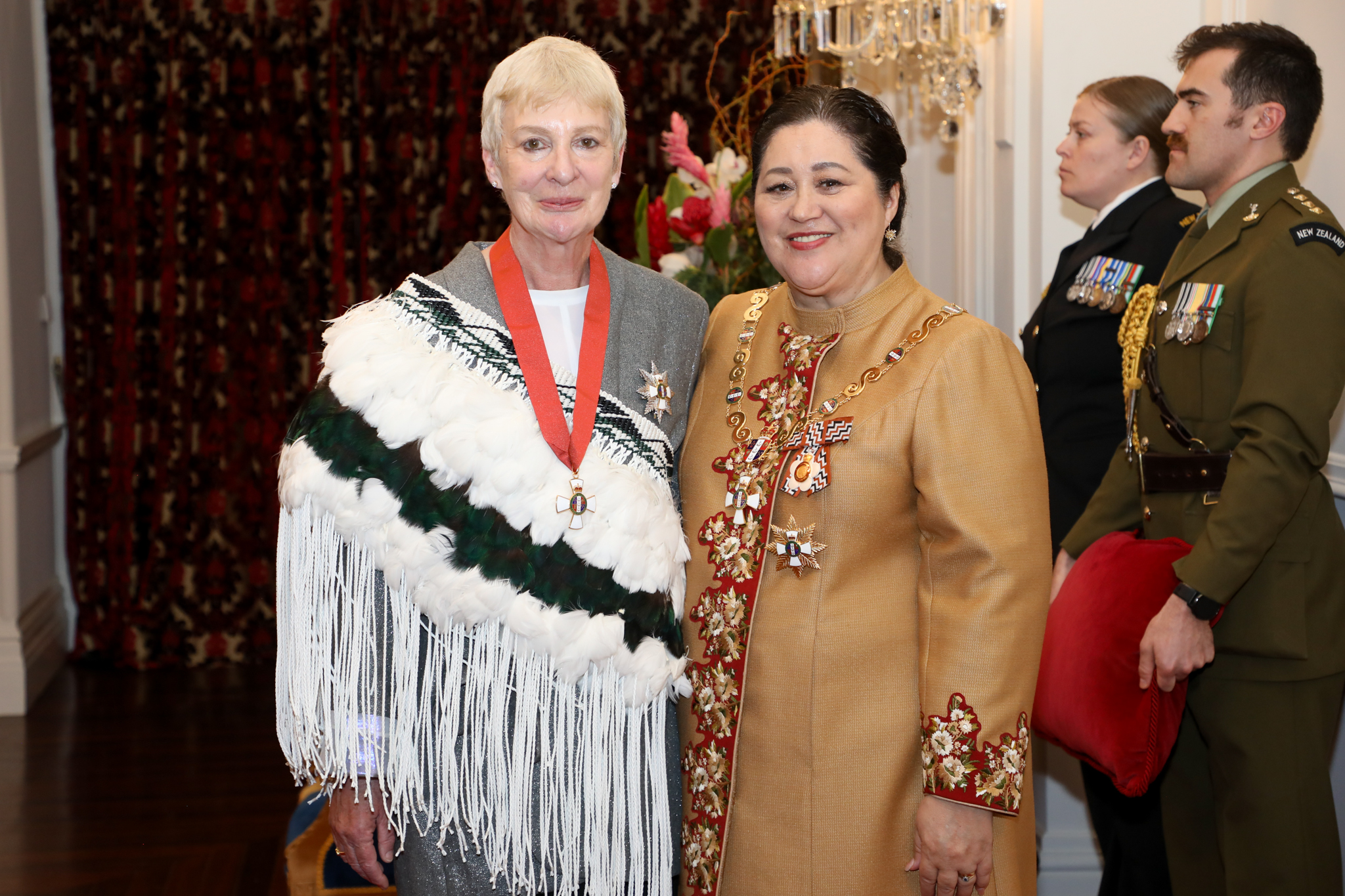
Quilter (left), after her investiture as a Dame Companion of the New Zealand Order of Merit by the governor-general, Dame Cindy Kiro, at Government House, Wellington, on 22 September 2023

In the 2019 Queen's Birthday Honours, Quilter was appointed a Companion of the Queen's Service Order, for services to the State. Also in 2019, she was named public service category winner at the Wellingtonian of the Year awards. In the 2023 King's Birthday and Coronation Honours, Quilter was made a Dame Companion of the New Zealand Order of Merit, for services to the public service and the arts.
