= Mangamutu =

Mangamutu Mangamutu
- Settlement
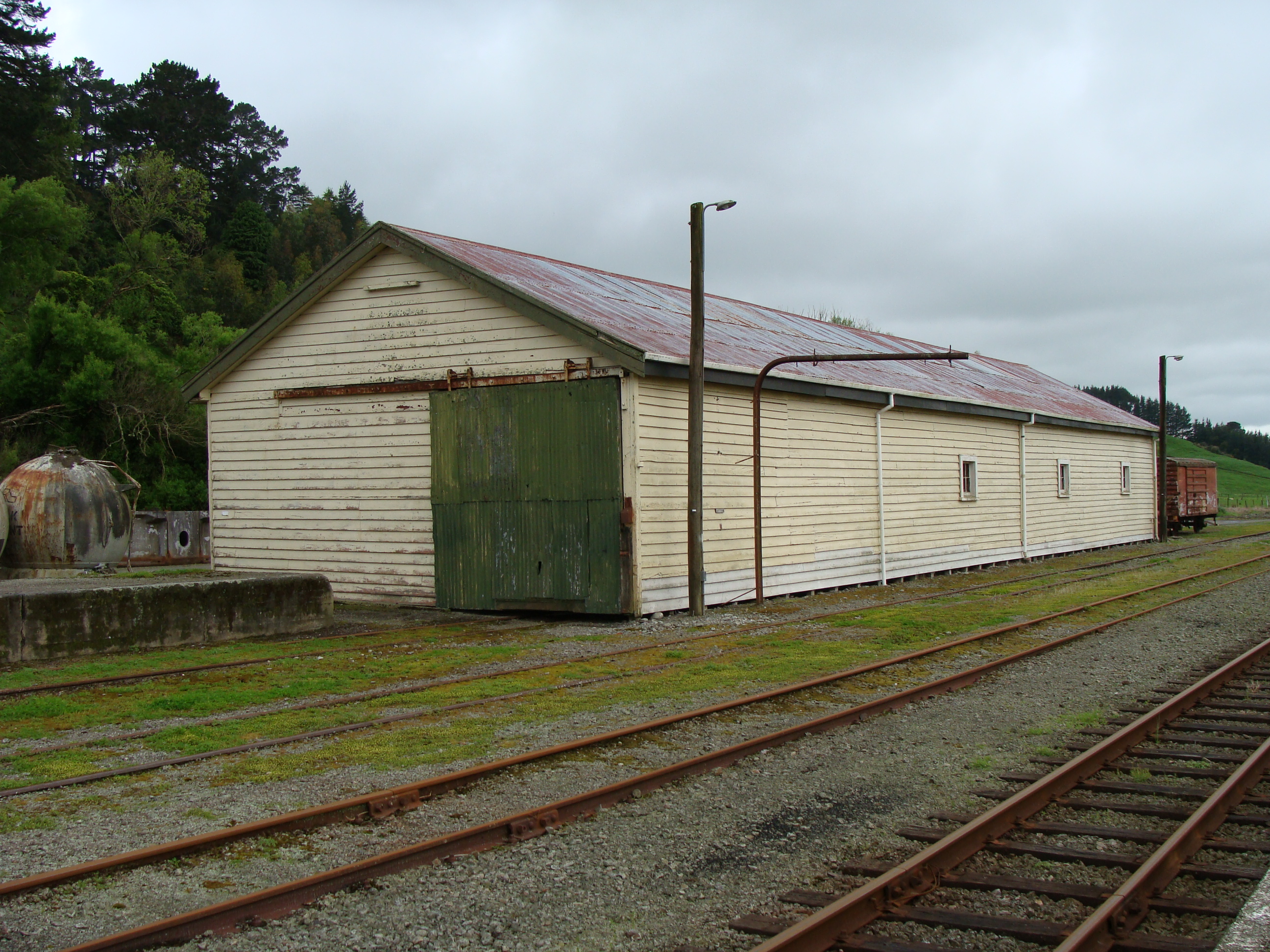
- Pahiatua railway station
- Interactive map of Mangamutu
- Coordinates: 40.448°S 175.817°E
- Country: New Zealand
- Region: Manawatū-Whanganui
- District: Tararua
- Ward: South Tararua General Ward; Tamaki nui-a Rua Maori Ward
- Electorates: Wairarapa; Ikaroa-Rāwhiti (Māori)

Government
  - Territorial Authority: Tararua District Council
  - Regional council: Horizons Regional Council
  - Tararua Mayor: Scott Gilmore
  - Wairarapa MP: TBD
  - Ikaroa-Rāwhiti MP: Cushla Tangaere-Manuel

Area
  - Total: 16.17 km^{2} (6.24 sq mi)

Population (2023 Census)
  - Total: 138
  - Density: 8.53/km^{2} (22.1/sq mi)
- Time zone: UTC+12 (NZST)
  - Summer (DST): UTC+13 (NZDT)
- Postal code: 4983
- Area code: 06

Mangamutu is a small settlement, on the western outskirts of Pahiatua, in the North Island of New Zealand. The Wairarapa Line runs through the area, with the Pahiatua railway station in the settlement. The settlement was the birthplace of former New Zealand Prime Minister and Governor General Sir Keith Holyoake.

== Etymology ==
Mangamutu takes its name from the nearby Mangamutu stream. It is a Māori phrase meaning finished stream from the words manga meaning stream and mutu meaning finished. The original European settlement was named Scarborough, after the town in Yorkshire, England. When a post office was established, the name was changed because there was already a Scarborough near Timaru.

== Demographics ==
Mangamutu locality covers 16.17 km^{2} (6.24 sq mi). It is part of the larger Mangatainoka statistical area.

Historical population
Year	Pop.	±% p.a.
2006	135	—
2013	144	+0.93%
2018	141	−0.42%
2023	138	−0.43%

Mangamutu had a population of 138 in the 2023 New Zealand census, a decrease of 3 people (−2.1%) since the 2018 census, and a decrease of 6 people (−4.2%) since the 2013 census. There were 72 males and 66 females in 51 dwellings. 2.2% of people identified as LGBTIQ+. The median age was 45.7 years (compared with 38.1 years nationally). There were 24 people (17.4%) aged under 15 years, 15 (10.9%) aged 15 to 29, 72 (52.2%) aged 30 to 64, and 24 (17.4%) aged 65 or older.

People could identify as more than one ethnicity. The results were 93.5% European (Pākehā), 15.2% Māori, and 2.2% Asian. English was spoken by 97.8%, and Māori by 2.2%. No language could be spoken by 2.2% (e.g. too young to talk). The percentage of people born overseas was 10.9, compared with 28.8% nationally.

Religious affiliations were 32.6% Christian, and 2.2% Māori religious beliefs. People who answered that they had no religion were 56.5%, and 6.5% of people did not answer the census question.

Of those at least 15 years old, 15 (13.2%) people had a bachelor's or higher degree, 66 (57.9%) had a post-high school certificate or diploma, and 33 (28.9%) people exclusively held high school qualifications. The median income was $44,700, compared with $41,500 nationally. 12 people (10.5%) earned over $100,000 compared to 12.1% nationally. The employment status of those at least 15 was 60 (52.6%) full-time and 15 (13.2%) part-time.

== Economy ==
Mangamutu is home to a significant Fonterra dairy factory. The factory was originally commissioned by the Tui Dairy Company in 1976; Tui merged with Hāwera-based Kiwi Dairies in 1996, who in turn merged with the New Zealand Dairy Group in 2001 to form Fonterra.
