= Mervyn Probine =

New Zealand physicist and public servant (1924–2010)

Dr Mervyn Probine CB FRSNZ
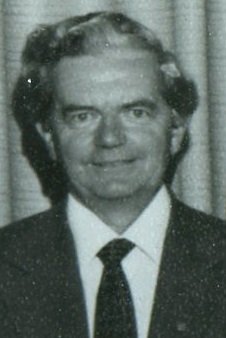

Chairman of the State Services Commission
- In office 1981–1986
- Prime Minister: Robert Muldoon; David Lange
- Preceded by: Robin Williams
- Succeeded by: Roderick Deane

Personal details
- Born: 30 April 1924 Auckland, New Zealand
- Died: 17 April 2010 (aged 85) Auckland, New Zealand
- Spouse: Marjorie Walker (m. 1949)
- Children: 2
- Scientific career
- Education: University of Leeds
- Fields: Biophysics
- Thesis: Molecular structure and mechanical properties of plant cell walls in relation to growth (1959)

Dr Mervyn Charles Probine CB FRSNZ (30 April 1924 – 17 April 2010) was a New Zealand physicist and public servant. He served as chairman of the State Services Commission between 1981 and 1986.

== Early life and family ==
Born in Auckland on 30 April 1924, Probine was the son of Frederick Charles Probine and Annie Kathleen Probine (née Polson). He married Marjorie Walker in 1949, and the couple went on to have two children.

== Career ==
Probine joined the Department of Scientific and Industrial Research (DSIR) as a draughtsman in 1942. He graduated with a Bachelor of Science from Auckland University College in 1947 and a Master of Science from 1951 from Victoria University College, and obtained a PhD in physics from the University of Leeds. In 1967, he was appointed director of the Physics and Engineering Laboratory (PEL), and then ten years later, was promoted to assistant director-general of the DSIR.

Dr Probine joined the State Services Commission in 1979, and was appointed chair of that body in 1981. During his tenure, the Official Information Act 1982 was passed and the Equal Employment Opportunities Unit (EEOU) was established. The EEOU was charged with promoting and monitoring access to employment opportunities in the New Zealand public service for ethnic minorities, women, and the disabled.

== Honours and awards ==
In 1964, Dr Probine was elected a Fellow of the Royal Society of New Zealand. In the 1986 New Year Honours, he was appointed a Companion of the Order of the Bath, in recognition of his service as chairman of the State Services Commission.

== Death ==
Dr Probine died in Auckland on 17 April 2010. His wife, Marjorie, died in 2023.
