= John H. Boyes =

John H. Boyes CMG

Public Service Commissioner
- In office 1936–1946
- Prime Minister: Michael Joseph Savage, Peter Fraser
- Preceded by: Thomas Mark
- Succeeded by: Richard M. Campbell CMG

John Henry Boyes CMG (6 March 1886 – 1 July 1958) was the fifth Public Service Commissioner in New Zealand.

He was chairman of the Social Security Commission, in between his terms as Public Service Commissioner (1936-38 & 1941–46). In 1936 the Labour government would have preferred Boyes to Thomas Mark as Public Service Commissioner, so appointed Boyes and Mark as Joint Commissioners. There was an awkward two years, before Boyes was appointed to establish the new Social Security Department.

Boyes was born in Auckland. In 1935, he was awarded the King George V Silver Jubilee Medal. He was appointed a Companion of the Order of St Michael and St George in the 1946 New Year Honours.

He died in 1958 and was buried at Purewa Cemetery in Auckland.
