= Brian Roche (business executive) =

New Zealand business executive

Sir Brian Roche KNZM
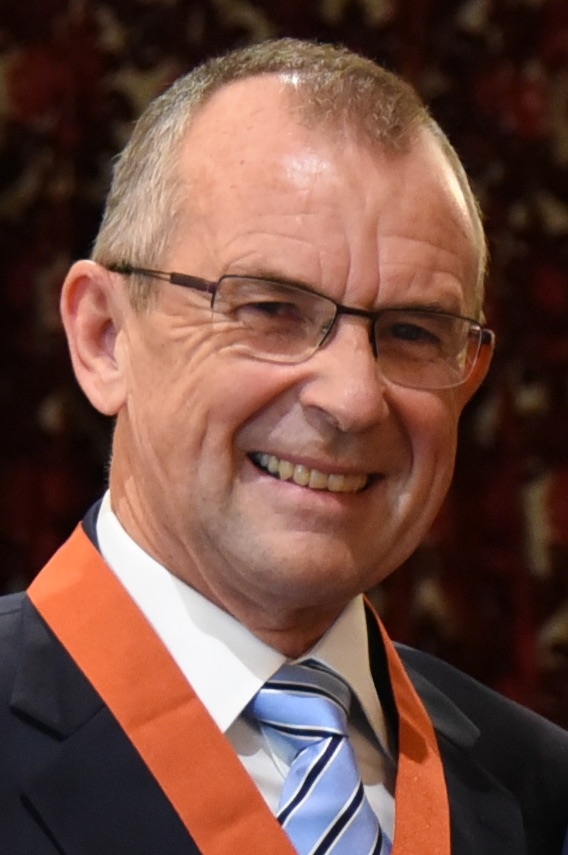
- Roche in 2017

19th Public Service Commissioner
- Incumbent
- Assumed office 4 November 2024
- Preceded by: Peter Hughes

Personal details
- Born: Brian Joseph Roche; 1955 or 1956 (age 70–71) Hawke's Bay, New Zealand
- Education: Victoria University of Wellington
- Occupation: Accountant; business executive; senior public servant

Sir Brian Joseph Roche KNZM (born 1955 or 1956) is a New Zealand business executive and senior public servant. He has served as Public Service Commissioner since 4 November 2024.

== Early life and education ==
Roche was born in Hawke's Bay and has six sisters and one brother. He attended St John's College in Hastings. He obtained a Bachelor of Commerce and Administration from Victoria University of Wellington.

He is married with two children.

== Career ==
Roche started his working career with Coopers and Lybrand in 1979 as an accountant. He stayed with the company, which later became PricewaterhouseCoopers, for 20 years and became a senior partner. In the 1990s, he was chief Crown negotiator for Treaty of Waitangi claims and settlements; he had a major influence on the 1997 Ngāi Tahu settlement.

In 2004, Roche became the inaugural chairman of the Auckland Regional Transport Authority. In 2008, he was appointed the inaugural chairman of the NZ Transport Agency. In the same year, he was appointed deputy commissioner of the Hawke's Bay District Health Board after the elected board was sacked by the then-Minister of Health, David Cunliffe. From January 2010 until April 2017, Roche was chief executive of New Zealand Post.

Since 2013, Roche was chairman of the Hurricanes rugby union franchise. He led the team that gained the 2011 Rugby World Cup hosting rights for New Zealand and later chaired group that organised the championship, taking over from Jock Hobbs. He has been chairman of Antarctica New Zealand, Tait Communications, and the Wellington Gateway Project. On 11 June 2019, Roche commenced his second term as chairman of the NZ Transport Agency. A condition of the appointment was Roche's resignation from the Wellington Gateway Project to avoid a conflict of interest.

In August 2020, Roche and Heather Simpson were chosen to lead a new group to support the Ministry of Health in improving COVID-19 border security. From March 2023 to February 2024, Roche chaired the government's cyclone recovery taskforce, responding to the impact of Cyclone Gabrielle.

In October 2024, Roche was appointed to the position of Public Service Commissioner, effective from 4 November 2024, for a term of two years and eight months through to June 2027.

== Honours and awards ==
In 1990, Roche was awarded the New Zealand 1990 Commemoration Medal. In the 2017 New Year Honours, he was appointed a Knight Companion of the New Zealand Order of Merit, for services to the State and business.
