= Donald Robertson (New Zealand) =

Donald Robertson ISO
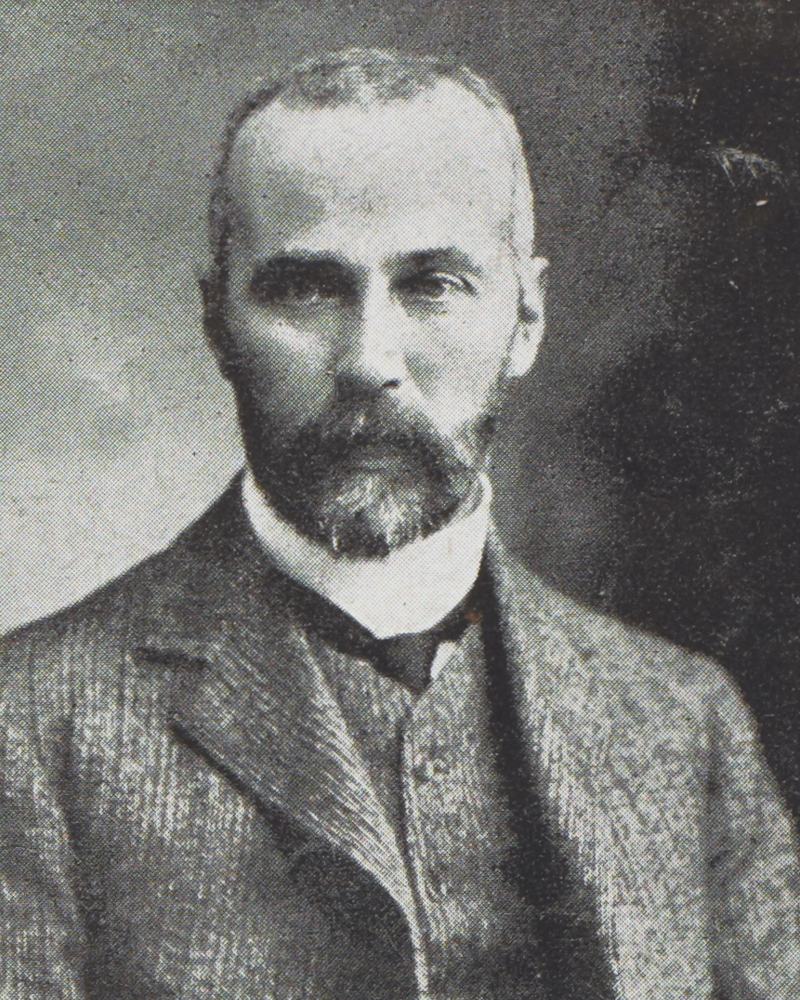

1st Public Service Commissioner
- In office 1913–1919
- Prime Minister: William Massey
- Succeeded by: William R. Morris

Personal details
- Born: 1860 Dunedin, New Zealand
- Died: 31 May 1942 (aged 81)

Donald Robertson ISO (1860 – 31 May 1942) was the first Public Service Commissioner in New Zealand. Prior to being the Public Service Commissioner, he was Secretary of the Post & Telegraph Department.

He wrote the Early History of the New Zealand Post Office. When he retired he lived in the south of France, but came back to New Zealand in the depression. He was born in Dunedin, and died in a Wanganui private hospital. Robertson married Edith Martin in 1883. They had two sons, Philip Robertson and Major H. D. Robertson of the NZMC.
