= Richard Hudson (New Zealand politician) =

New Zealand politician

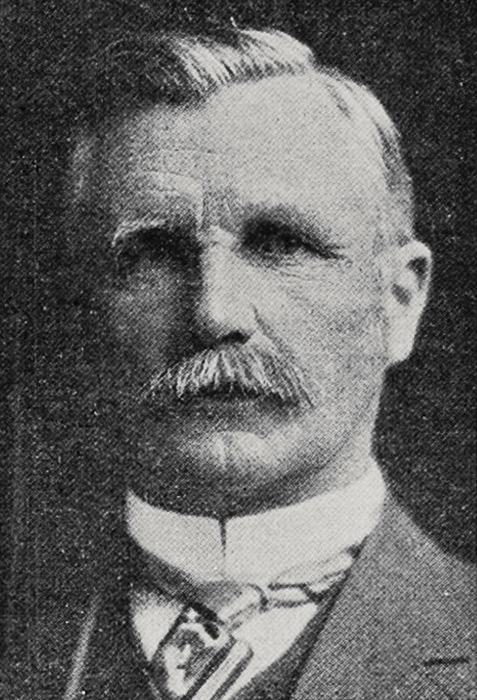
Richard Hudson

Richard Phineas Hudson (1860 – 2 May 1953) was a Reform Party Member of Parliament in New Zealand. Born in Ireland, he was a tea planter in British Ceylon before becoming a fruit grower in New Zealand.

== Early life ==
Hudson was born in Dungarvan, County Waterford, Ireland in 1860. He received his education at Wills Grammar School, at Fermoy College, and at Crawford's Military Academy. For seven years, he served in the Royal Artillery Militia and gained the rank of captain. He then lived in Ceylon for 23 years, where he had tea and coffee plantations, and where he was chairman of the Haputale Planters' Association. He was credited with uniting the Ceylon tea-growers, them agreeing to pay a tax to an industry body that would be used to market Ceylon tea in overseas markets.

== New Zealand ==
New Zealand Parliament
Years	Term	Electorate	Party
1914–1919	19th	Motueka	Reform
1919–1922	20th	Motueka	Reform
1922–1925	21st	Motueka	Reform
1925–1928	22nd	Motueka	Reform

In 1908, he emigrated to New Zealand. He started growing fruit and within a short time, he held numerous offices. At first, he was president of the Motueka District Fruitgrowers' Union, then president of the Motueka District Fruit-growers' Association, then president of the Nelson District Fruit-growers' Association, before being elected president of the New Zealand Fruit-growers' Federation in September 2013 after only six years in the business. Hudson was a member of the Motueka Harbour Board.

He was selected as the candidate of the Reform Party for the Motueka electorate in May 1914. He won the election in December 1914 against the incumbent, Roderick McKenzie of the Liberal Party, and held the electorate to the 1928 election, when he was defeated. The Hudsons left New Zealand in January 1930 to live in Ceylon again.

== Family ==
Hudson was married to Ellen Phyllis Hudson. Their son, Corporal Thomas Henry Hudson, died on 18 May 1916 while on active service in a British army hospital of pneumonia and heart failure. Richard Hudson died in 1953 and was buried at Karori Cemetery.

New Zealand Parliament
Preceded by Roderick McKenzie	Member of Parliament for Motueka; 1914–1928	Succeeded by George Black
