= Robin Williams (mathematician) =

New Zealand mathematician, public servant, university administrator

Robin Williams CB CBE

Chairman of the State Services Commission
- In office 1975–1981
- Prime Minister: Bill Rowling; Robert Muldoon
- Preceded by: Ian G. Lythgoe
- Succeeded by: Mervyn Probine

Personal details
- Born: Robert Martin Williams; 30 March 1919 Christchurch, New Zealand
- Died: 18 March 2013 (aged 93) Wellington, New Zealand
- Spouse: Mary Thorpe (m. 1944; died 2011)
- Children: 3
- Relatives: Bridget Williams (daughter)

Robert Martin Williams CB CBE (30 March 1919 – 18 March 2013), generally known as Robin Williams, was a New Zealand mathematician, academic administrator and public servant. He served as vice chancellor of the University of Otago from 1967 to 1972, and of the Australian National University from 1973 to 1975. Between 1975 and 1981, he was chair of the State Services Commission.

== Early life and family ==
Born in Christchurch in 1919, Williams was educated at Christ's College and went on to study at Canterbury University College, graduating MA with first-class honours in mathematics and mathematical physics in 1941.

On 15 July 1944, Williams married Mary Thorpe in Wellington, and the couple went on to have three children.

== Career ==
Williams worked in the applied mathematics laboratory of the Department of Scientific and Industrial Research. During World War II, he worked at the University of California, Berkeley on the Manhattan Project in 1944–45 on the separation of uranium. After the war, he graduated from St. John's College, Cambridge, with a Bachelor of Arts (1946) and PhD (1949). He was a Harkness Fellow at Princeton in 1957.

In 1963, Williams moved to work as an administrator at the State Services Commission. From 1967 to 1972, Williams was vice chancellor of the University of Otago, before accepting the same position at the Australian National University in Canberra, where he remained until 1975. That year, he was appointed chair of the State Services Commission, based in Wellington, serving in that role until 1981. In 1971 he succeeded Dr K. J. Sheen as Director-General of Education in New Zealand.

== Honours and awards ==
Williams was elected to the American Philosophical Society in 1967. In 1972, Williams was conferred with an honorary LLD degree by the University of Otago. In the 1973 New Year Honours, he was appointed a Commander of the Order of the British Empire, for services to science, administration and education, and in the 1981 Queen's Birthday Honours, he was made a Companion of the Order of the Bath.

== Death ==
Williams died in Wellington in 2013, aged 93. His funeral was held at Old St Paul's, and he was buried at Mākara Cemetery.

== Sources ==
Henderson, Alan (1990). The Quest for Efficiency:The Origins of the State Services Commission. State Services Commission. ISBN 0-477-05538-9.
