= Paul Verschaffelt =

New Zealand lawyer (1887–1959)

Paul Verschaffelt CMG
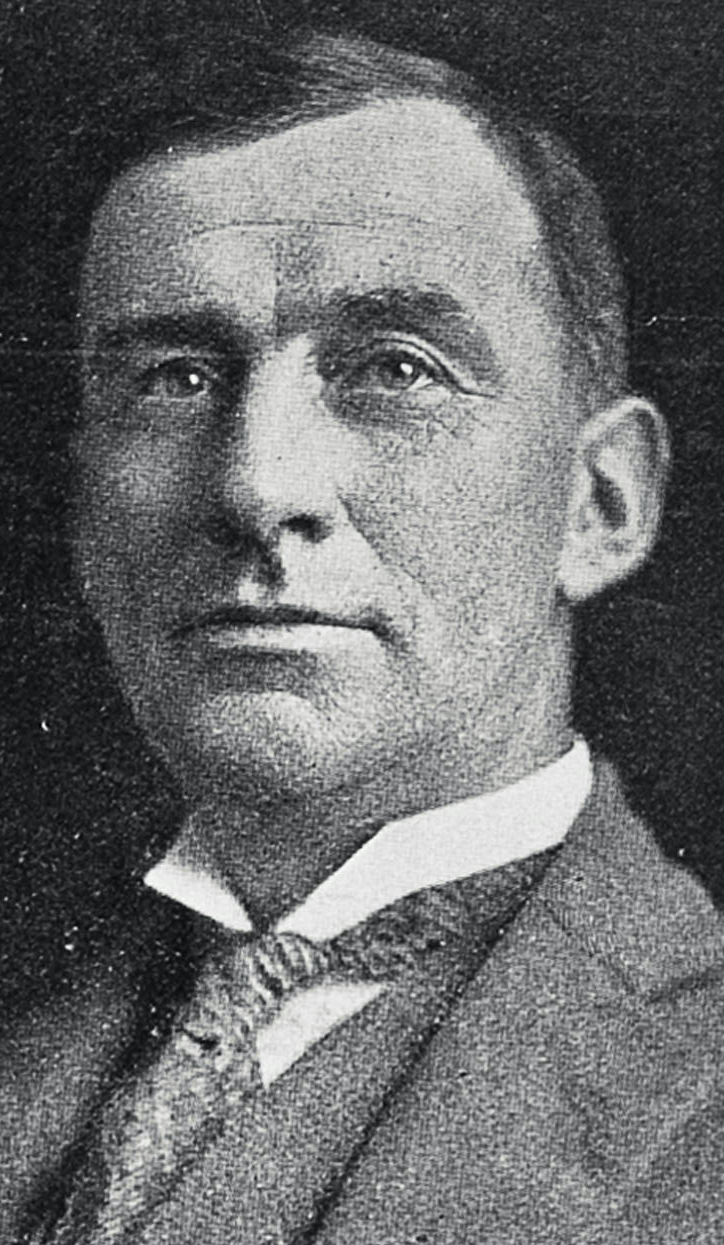

3rd Public Service Commissioner
- In office 1923–1935
- Prime Minister: William Massey; Francis Bell; Gordon Coates; Joseph Ward; George Forbes
- Preceded by: William R. Morris
- Succeeded by: Thomas Mark

Personal details
- Born: Paul Desiré Nestor Verschaffelt; 21 May 1887 Napier, New Zealand
- Died: 16 February 1959 (aged 71) Napier, New Zealand

Paul Desiré Nestor Verschaffelt CMG (21 May 1887 – 16 February 1959) was a barrister, solicitor, and the third Public Service Commissioner in New Zealand.

== Early life ==
Verschaffelt was born in Napier in 1887.

== Career ==
On 1 January 1904, Verschaffelt entered the public service as a clerical cadet in the Department of Lands and Survey. On 1 February 1913 he shifted to the newly established Office of the Public Service Commissioner as a clerk.

In 1915 he was promoted to secretary, and after graduating LLB from Victoria University College in 1919 was admitted as a barrister and solicitor.

Between 1919 and 1921 Verschaffelt served as controller of wills, trusts and agencies and as chief accountant in the Public Trust Office. He returned to the Office of the Public Service Commissioner as assistant commissioner on 1 March 1921.

In February 1923, on the retirement of William R. Morris, he became acting commissioner and on 1 June was appointed commissioner for a seven-year term.

In 1928 Verschaffelt visited Western Samoa with Carl Berendsen and Alexander Park: they reported that the Samoan public service was "by no means creditable to New Zealand". In 1930 he was reappointed for a second seven-year term as commissioner, and was appointed a Companion of the Order of St Michael and St George (CMG) in the 1930 King's Birthday Honours. Between 1933 and 1935 he worked with Gordon Coates's "brains trust" on economic and fiscal policy and in 1935, as a "technical expert", he accompanied Coates to London for discussions on trade policy. It was while in London, at the age of 48, that he resigned; this last trip was described in the press at the time as a "political mystery".

== Family ==
Verschaffelt married Eanie Stella Martin in Wellington on the 30 December 1913. Eanie died in September 1920, a month after the birth of their third child. In Dunedin on 29 December 1923, Verschaffelt married Olive Beryl Norwood. Verschaffelt fathered another child with Norwood, a daughter, who died at the age of 13 in 1939.

== Alcoholism ==
At the time of Verschaffelt's retirement, he had been under treatment for alcoholism. In 1934 he had been asked by the government to undergo treatment at Queen Mary Hospital, Hanmer Springs. His remaining years were punctuated with appearances before the courts, and periods in Rotoroa Inebriates' Institution, Mount Eden prison, and Porirua Hospital. Perhaps the most notorious incident was his expulsion from Parliament by the Speaker for protesting from the gallery about the 'abortion of a bill' which became the Public Service Amendment Act 1946.

== Death ==
By 1955 Verschaffelt and Olive Beryl Norwood were living apart. On his retirement Verschaffelt was hailed as 'able and strong-charactered' and 'a public figure of considerable size'. A colleague, W. B. Sutch, later described him as having 'one of the finest minds and broadest judgments of any New Zealand civil servant of this century'. Paul Verschaffelt died in Napier on 16 February 1959, survived by his wife and the three children of his first marriage.
