= Thomas Mark =

Public Service Commissioner
- In office 1936–1941
- Prime Minister: Michael Joseph Savage, Peter Fraser
- Preceded by: Paul N.D. Verschaffelt CMG
- Succeeded by: John H. Boyes CMG

Personal details
- Born: Waiatahuna
- Died: 9 June 1941

Thomas Mark (11 July 1887 – 9 June 1941) was the fourth Public Service Commissioner in New Zealand. He was a conservative in favour of a non-political public service. In 1936 the Labour government would have preferred John H. Boyes to Thomas Mark, who was the logical appointment as Public Service Commissioner. So Boyes and Mark were appointed as co-equal Joint Commissioners, and there was an awkward two years before Boyes was appointed to establish the new Social Security Department.

Mark died in his Minister's office. He ‘courageously defied a minister over the issue of inspecting a sub-department and compelling the resignation of its head’ before dying of heart failure in the minister's office in the middle of the confrontation according to the State Services Commission website. But the obituaries in the two Wellington newspapers say he was on his way to the office of the Minister of Justice and Education, Mr Mason, and was in the passageway outside the minister's office when he collapsed. He was 54 years old, and was born in Waitahuna.

He was survived by his wife Daisy, five sons and two daughters.
