= Philip Robertson (chemist) =

New Zealand chemist

Philip Wilfred Robertson was a New Zealand chemist, university professor, and writer.

Philip Robertson, son of Donald Robertson was born on 22 September 1884 and educated at Wellington College, where he was dux in 1900. He then graduated with an MA in chemistry from Victoria University of Wellington in 1905, followed by an MSc in 1906. He was awarded a Sir George Grey Scholarship, a Senior Scholarship and the Jacob Joseph Scholarship. He gained first-class honours in natural sciences at Trinity College, Oxford as a Rhodes Scholar, followed by a PhD at Leipzig University.

Robertson married Florence Elizabeth Graham in 1912. He took up the chair of chemistry at Victoria University College in 1920 where he headed the department for 30 years.

Robertson had an interest in literature and wrote several short stories.

In his retirement Robertson was appointed professor emeritus. He was awarded the Hector Memorial Medal in 1919 and in 1950 was elected to a fellowship of the Royal Society of New Zealand. Robertson died in London on 7 May 1969.
