= Roderick McKenzie =

New Zealand politician

The Honourable Roderick McKenzie
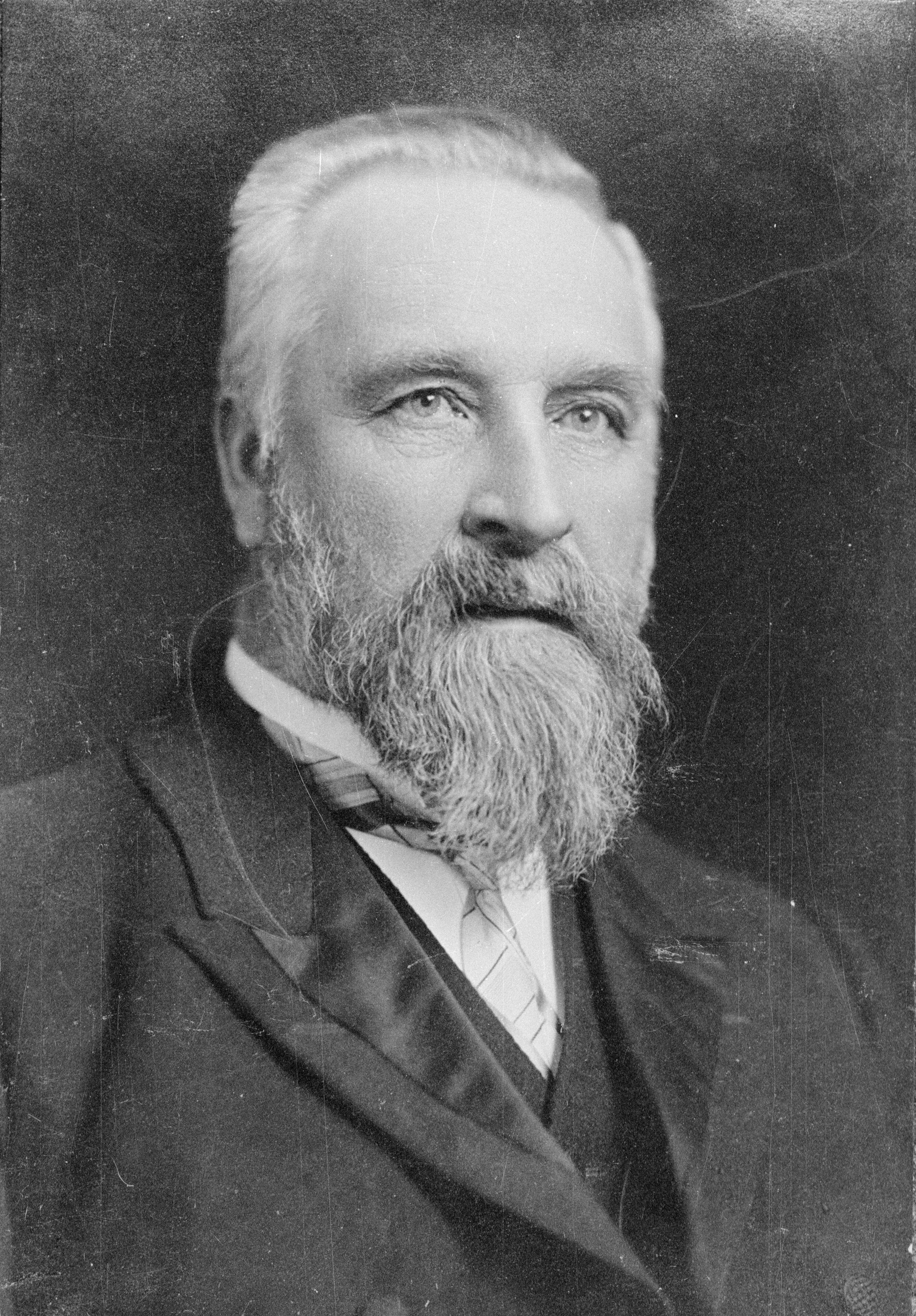

25th Minister of Customs
- In office 4 September 1911 – 28 March 1912
- Prime Minister: Sir Joseph Ward
- Preceded by: George Fowlds
- Succeeded by: George Laurenson

13th Minister of Public Works
- In office 6 January 1909 – 28 March 1912
- Prime Minister: Sir Joseph Ward
- Preceded by: William Hall-Jones
- Succeeded by: William MacDonald

10th Minister of Mines
- In office 6 January 1909 – 28 March 1912
- Prime Minister: Sir Joseph Ward
- Preceded by: James McGowan
- Succeeded by: James Colvin

Member of the New Zealand Parliament for Motueka
- In office 4 December 1896 – 11 December 1914
- Preceded by: John Kerr
- Succeeded by: Richard Hudson

Member of the New Zealand Parliament for Buller
- In office 28 November 1893 – 4 December 1896
- Preceded by: Eugene O'Conor
- Succeeded by: Patrick O'Regan

Personal details
- Born: 1852 Ross-shire, Scotland
- Died: 9 October 1934 (aged 81–82) Wellington, New Zealand
- Party: Liberal
- Occupation: Engineer

Roderick McKenzie (1852 – 9 October 1934) was a New Zealand Member of Parliament for Buller and Motueka, in the South Island. He was a member of the Liberal Party.

== Biography ==
=== Early life and career ===
He was born in Ross-shire, Scotland in 1852. He was educated at the Glasgow Academy and became a builder by trade. He then began two years of employment with the London and Glasgow Engineering and Ironship Building Company before deciding to move to Canada. He did not reside there long before emigrating to New Zealand in 1869. He sailed on the ship City of Dunedin and after arriving in Otago he became a miner.

McKenzie left his mining job in Otago to move to the West Coast and enter the construction industry as an engineer and bridge builder. He was involved in building infrastructure in the area. His projects included construction of the Westport Staiths at a cost of 22,000 pounds, the railway bridge at Arahura, laying rails to Hokitika and years later the Jervois Quay wharf in Wellington.

He became involved in community affairs on the West Coast. He was elected a member of the Westport Harbour Board, Nelson Harbour Board and Kumara Hospital Board.

=== Member of Parliament ===
New Zealand Parliament
Years	Term	Electorate	Party
1893–1896	12th	Buller	Liberal
1896–1899	13th	Motueka	Liberal
1899–1902	14th	Motueka	Liberal
1902–1905	15th	Motueka	Liberal
1905–1908	16th	Motueka	Liberal
1908–1911	17th	Motueka	Liberal
1911–1914	18th	Motueka	Liberal

McKenzie was the MP for Buller between 1893 and 1896 and the MP for Motueka from 1896 to 1914. He was a "strong supporter of the Seddon administration". In Parliament he helped to pass a Loan Bill which allowed the Westport Harbour Board to borrow £50,000 in order to fund extensive and long overdue improvements. In July 1905 a group of "country" Liberal members formed a ginger group and proclaimed their intention to advocate country interests in the Government caucus. MacKenzie was one of the group's members and was elected as their leader. He was Chairman of Committees from 1906 to 1908.

He was Minister of Public Works, Minister of Customs and Minister of Mines from 1909 to 1912 under Sir Joseph Ward. The practical experience he had as an engineer and builder made him an effective minister as the period featured great activity in public works schemes, particularly in roading improvements. However, in 1912 McKenzie would have nothing to do with Thomas Mackenzie's (no relation) Liberal Ministry stating that: John Millar should have been prime minister, Mackenzie's ministers were political novices and had forsaken their liberal principles.

In 1932, when he was 80 years old, McKenzie contested the Motueka seat once again at the by-election following the death of George Black. Standing as an Independent Liberal–Labour candidate he placed third out of three candidates.

=== Later life and death ===
Following his exit from Parliament, McKenzie resumed his career as an engineer and contractor in Wellington. He was also a prominent member of the West Coast Association.

McKenzie died on 9 October 1934 in Wellington aged 82.

== Notes ==
New Zealand Parliament
Preceded by Eugene O'Conor	Member of Parliament for Buller; 1893–1896	Succeeded by Patrick O'Regan
In abeyance Title last held by John Kerr	Member of Parliament for Motueka; 1896–1914	Succeeded by Richard Hudson
Political offices
Preceded by John A. Millar	Chairman of Committees of the House of Representatives; 1906–1908	Succeeded by Thomas Wilford
Preceded by James Colvin	Minister of Mines; 1908–1912	Succeeded by James McGowan
Preceded by William Hall-Jones	Minister of Public Works; 1908–1912	Succeeded by William MacDonald
Preceded by George Fowlds	Minister of Customs; 1911–1912	Succeeded by George Laurenson
