= Motueka (electorate) =

Motueka is a former New Zealand parliamentary electorate. It was first created in 1860 and existed until the 1890 election, when it was abolished. For the 1896 election the Motueka electorate was recreated, and lasted until the 1946 election, when it was again abolished.

== Population centres ==
In the 1860 electoral redistribution, the House of Representatives increased the number of representatives by 12, reflecting the immense population growth since the original electorates were established in 1853. The redistribution created 15 additional electorates with between one and three members, and Motueka was one of the single-member electorates. The electorates were distributed to provinces so that every province had at least two members. Within each province, the number of registered electors by electorate varied greatly. The Motueka electorate had 311 registered electors for the 1861 election.

Localities within the electorate were Motueka and Māpua. The Motueka electorate took in about half the area of the prior Motueka and Massacre Bay electorate; the other half had gone to the Collingwood electorate.

== History ==
From the 3rd to the 10th New Zealand Parliament, Motueka was represented by five Members of Parliament (counting Monro, who was unseated following a petition). Curtis and Parker had previously represented the Motueka and Massacre Bay electorate. David Monro represented the electorate in 1871 until he was unseated by Parliament on a petition. Parker was followed by Richmond Hursthouse 1876–87, then John Kerr 1887–90.

The Motueka electorate was held for 14 years by Richard Hudson of the Reform Party from the 1914 election. In 1928, Hudson was unexpectedly beaten by 24-year-old George Black of the United Party. The Reform Party looked for potential candidates to win back the electorate, and a young farmer who was not even a member, Keith Holyoake, was suggested. Holyoake, who had been saving money to go overseas, was chosen in June 1931 from five candidates to contest Motueka, and his savings went into the election campaign instead. Meanwhile, there was a desire by parts of the United Party to enter into a coalition with the Reform Party to avoid vote splitting on the centre-right, but it was not until September that the United–Reform Coalition was announced.

Black had voted with the Labour Party in March 1931 on the Finance Bill and was expelled from the United Party the following day, thus becoming an independent. At the 1931 election, Black beat Holyoake. In October 1932, Black committed suicide, and this caused the 1932 Motueka by-election, which was won by future prime minister Holyoake.

Holyoake was defeated in 1938 by Jerry Skinner, who was a likely Labour leader if he had not died prematurely.

=== Members of Parliament ===
Key

Independent	Liberal	Reform
United	National	Labour

Election	Winner
1861 election	Herbert Curtis
1866 election	Charles Parker
1871 election	David Monro
1871 (Note: Charles Parker declared elected on petition, 20 September 1871)	Charles Parker (2nd period)
1876 election	Richmond Hursthouse
1879 election	Richmond Hursthouse
1881 election	Richmond Hursthouse
1884 election	Richmond Hursthouse
1887 election	John Kerr
(Electorate abolished, 1890–1896)
1896 election	Roderick McKenzie
1899 election	Roderick McKenzie
1902 election	Roderick McKenzie
1905 election	Roderick McKenzie
1908 election	Roderick McKenzie
1911 election	Roderick McKenzie
1914 election	Richard Hudson
1919 election	Richard Hudson
1922 election	Richard Hudson
1925 election	Richard Hudson
1928 election	George Black (Note: George Black became an independent in March 1931)
1931 election	George Black
1932 by-election	Keith Holyoake
1935 election	Keith Holyoake
1938 election	Jerry Skinner
1943 election	Jerry Skinner
(Electorate abolished 1946)

Table footnotes:

== Election results ==
=== 1943 election ===
1943 general election: Motueka
Party	Candidate	Votes	%	±%
Labour	Jerry Skinner	4,260	51.30	−2.86
National	John Robert Haldane	3,959	47.67	
Informal votes		85	1.02	+0.18
Majority		301	3.62	−5.54
Turnout		8,304	92.32	−1.68
Registered electors		8,994		

=== 1938 election ===
1938 general election: Motueka
Party	Candidate	Votes	%	±%
Labour	Jerry Skinner	5,142	54.16	
National	Keith Holyoake	4,272	44.99	−6.41
Informal votes		80	0.84	−0.02
Majority		870	9.16	
Turnout		9,494	94.00	+2.06
Registered electors		10,099		

=== 1935 election ===
1935 general election: Motueka
Party	Candidate	Votes	%	±%
Reform	Keith Holyoake	5,115	51.40	+2.36
Labour	Rubert York	4,835	48.59	
Informal votes		86	0.86	
Majority		280	2.81	−5.73
Turnout		9,950	91.94	+2.91
Registered electors		10,822		

=== 1932 by-election ===
1932 Motueka by-election
Party	Candidate	Votes	%	±%
Reform	Keith Holyoake	3,887	49.04	+2.34
Labour	Paddy Webb	3,210	40.50	
Liberal–Labour	Roderick McKenzie	829	10.46	
Majority		677	8.54	+1.95
Turnout		7,926	89.03	+0.52
Registered electors		8,903		
Reform gain from Independent		Swing		

=== 1931 election ===
1931 general election: Motueka
Party	Candidate	Votes	%	±%
Independent	George Black	4,180	53.30	−0.75
Reform	Keith Holyoake	3,663	46.70	
Majority		517	6.59	−1.50
Informal votes		37	0.47	−0.21
Turnout		7,880	88.51	−1.71
Registered electors		8,903		

=== 1928 election ===
1928 general election: Motueka
Party	Candidate	Votes	%	±%
United	George Black	4,095	54.05	
Reform	Richard Hudson	3,482	45.95	−11.86
Majority		613	8.09	−23.71
Informal votes		52	0.68	+0.23
Turnout		7,629	90.22	−0.85
Registered electors		8,456		

=== 1925 election ===
1925 general election: Motueka
Party	Candidate	Votes	%	±%
Reform	Richard Hudson	4,356	65.90	
Labour	Mark Fagan	2,254	34.10	
Majority		2,102	31.80	
Informal votes		30	0.45	
Turnout		6,640	91.07	
Registered electors		7,291		

=== 1914 election ===
1914 general election: Motueka
Party	Candidate	Votes	%	±%
Reform	Richard Hudson	2,760	56.12	
Liberal	Roderick McKenzie	2,158	43.88	
Majority		602	12.24	
Informal votes		16	0.32	
Turnout		4,934	82.44	
Registered electors		5,985		

=== 1899 election ===
1899 general election: Motueka
Party	Candidate	Votes	%	±%
Liberal	Roderick McKenzie	2,078	67.25	+23.39
Conservative	Walter Moffatt	1,012	32.75	
Majority		1,066	34.50	+30.27
Turnout		3,090	72.10	−11.10
Registered electors		4,286		

=== 1896 election ===
1896 general election: Motueka
Party	Candidate	Votes	%	±%
Liberal	Roderick McKenzie	1,306	43.85	
Conservative	Richmond Hursthouse	1,180	39.62	
Liberal	William Norris Franklyn	492	16.52	
Majority		126	4.23	
Informal votes		7	0.23	
Registered electors		3,588		
Turnout		2,985	83.19	

=== 1887 election ===
1887 general election: Motueka
Party	Candidate	Votes	%	±%
Independent	John Kerr	675	55.83	
Independent	Richmond Hursthouse	534	44.17	
Majority		141	11.66	
Turnout		1,209	69.56	
Registered electors		1,738		
