= 1932 Motueka by-election =

New Zealand by-election

- 1 December 1932
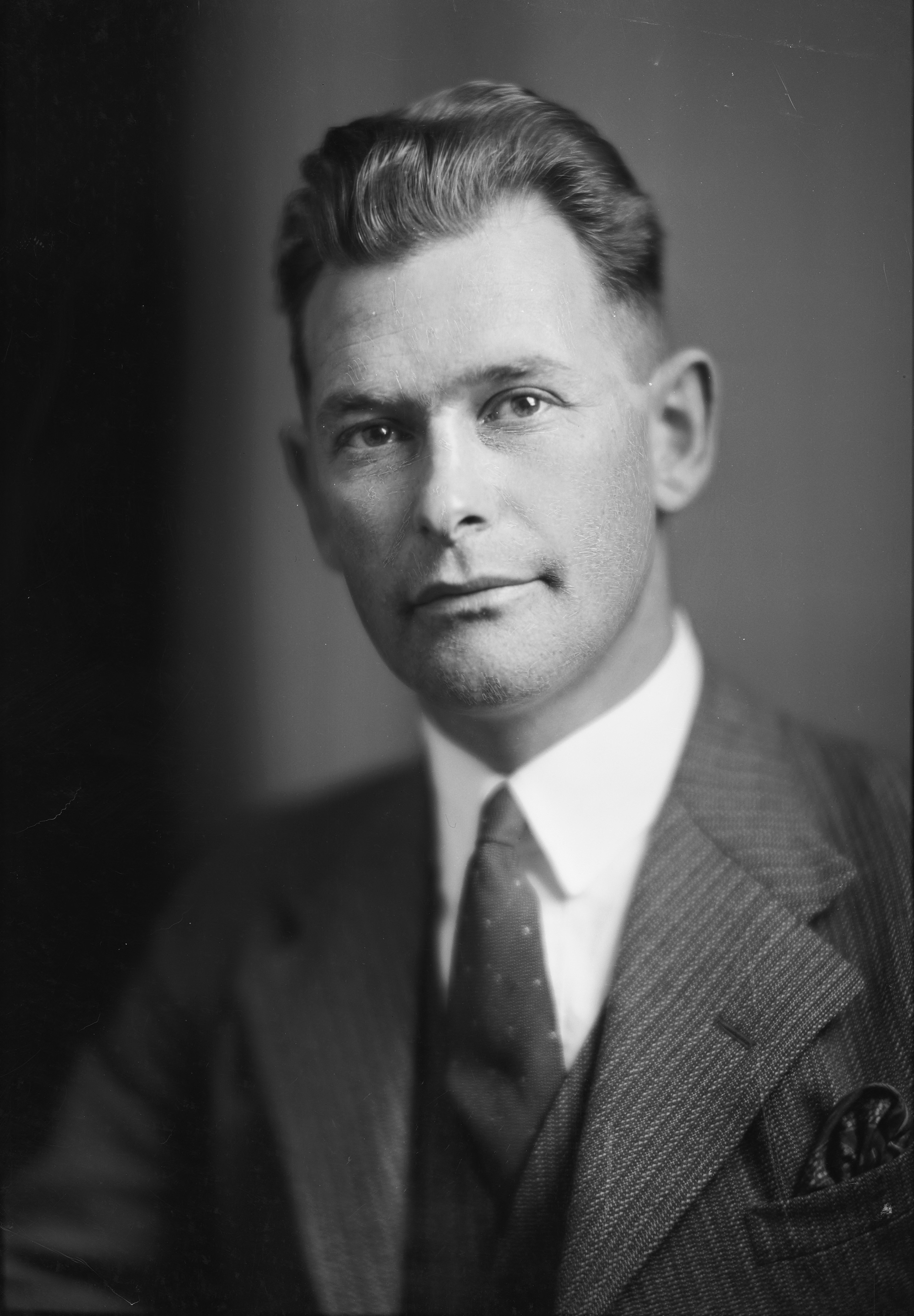

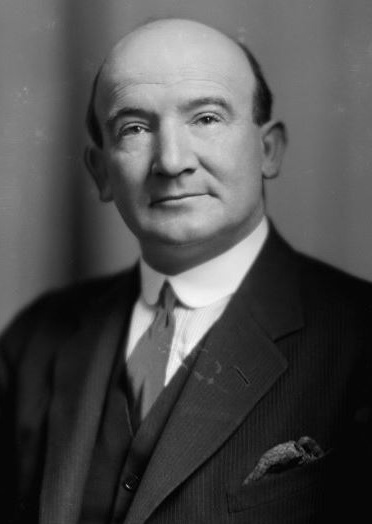

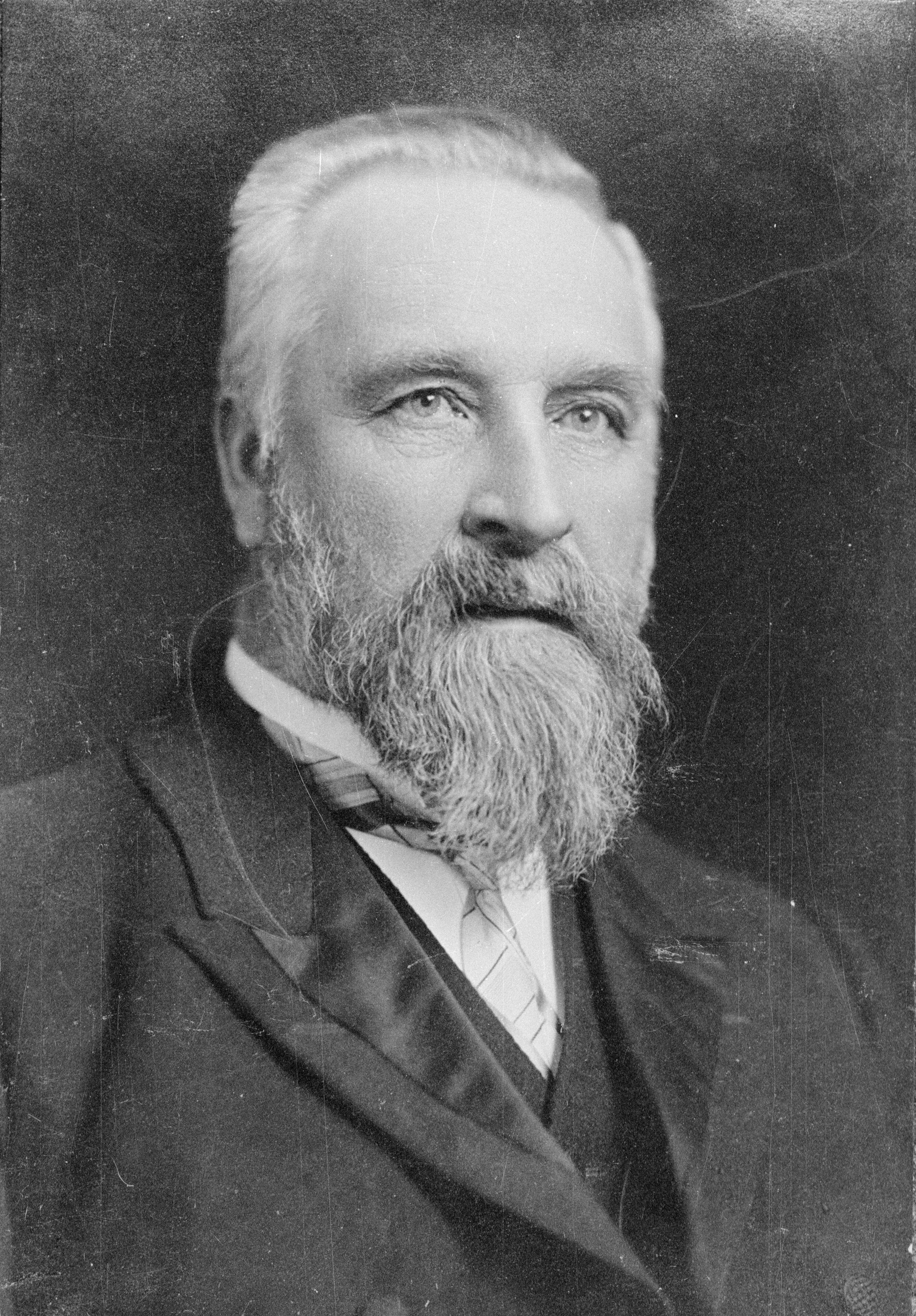
Candidate	Keith Holyoake	Paddy Webb	Roderick McKenzie
Party	Reform	Labour	Liberal–Labour
Popular vote	3,887	3,210	829
Member before election
George Black
Independent
Elected Member
Keith Holyoake
Reform

The 1932 Motueka by-election was a by-election in the New Zealand electorate of Motueka, a rural seat at the top of the South Island.

The by-election occurred on 1 December 1932, and was precipitated by the suicide of sitting Independent member of parliament George Black on 17 October 1932.

The by-election was contested by Keith Holyoake (Reform Party candidate for the United/Reform Coalition), Paddy Webb (Labour Party), and 80-year-old Roderick McKenzie, ex-MP for Motueka (1896–1914) standing as Independent Liberal–Labour.

== 1931 general election result ==
1931 General election: Motueka
Party	Candidate	Votes	%	±%
Independent	George Black	4,180	53.30	−0.75
Reform	Keith Holyoake	3,663	46.70	
Majority		517	6.59	−1.50
Informal votes		37	0.47	−0.21
Turnout		7,880	88.51	−1.71
Registered electors		8,903		
Independent hold		Swing		

== 1932 by-election result ==
The following table gives the election results:

1932 Motueka by-election
Party	Candidate	Votes	%	±%
Reform	Keith Holyoake	3,887	49.04	+2.34
Labour	Paddy Webb	3,210	40.50	
Liberal–Labour	Roderick McKenzie	829	10.46	
Majority		677	8.54	+1.95
Turnout		7,926	89.03	+0.52
Registered electors		8,903		
Reform gain from Independent		Swing		
