= Public Service Commission (New Zealand) =

New Zealand public service department

- Te Kawa Mataaho (Māori)

Agency overview
- Formed: 1913
- Preceding agency: State Services Commission
- Jurisdiction: New Zealand
- Headquarters: Lvl 10, Reserve Bank Bldg, 2 The Terrace, Wellington WELLINGTON 6140
- Annual budget: Vote Public Service; Total budget for 2019/20 ▼$62,787,000
- Minister responsible: Hon Paul Goldsmith Minister for the Public Service
- Agency executive: Brian Roche Public Service Commissioner
- Website: www.publicservice.govt.nz

The Public Service Commission (PSC; Māori: Te Kawa Mataaho), called the State Services Commission until 2020, is the central public service department of New Zealand charged with overseeing, managing, and improving the performance of the state sector of New Zealand and its organisations.

The PSC's official responsibilities, as defined by the State Sector Act 1988, include:

- appointing and reviewing Public Service chief executives,
- promoting and developing senior leadership and management capability for the Public Service,
- providing advice on the training and career development of staff in the Public Service,
- reviewing the performance of each department,
- providing advice on the allocation of functions to and between departments and other agencies,
- providing advice on management systems, structures, and organisations in the Public Service and Crown entities,
- promoting, developing, and monitoring equal employment opportunities policies and programmes, and
- any other functions with respect to the administration and management of the Public Service, as directed by the Prime Minister.

The role of PSC, as described in the four year plan, is "to work with leaders across the State Services to change the way agencies think, organise and operate".

== Commissioner ==
The Public Service Commissioner is the chief executive of the commission and has a range of responsibilities for the public service, the State Services and the wider state sector. The position has previously been known as the Public Service Commissioner, Chairman of the Public Service Commissioner, Chairman of the State Services Commission, and Chief Commissioner of the Public Service Commission. The current Public Service Commissioner is Brian Roche.

=== Modern role ===
The State Services Commissioner plays a central role in New Zealand's public service. One of the Commissioner's most visible roles is in the employment, supervision and dismissal of senior executives in individual Government departments; by preventing Ministers of the Crown from becoming personally involved in employment decisions, this acts as a safeguard against politicisation of the public service. The Commissioner also has power to issue codes of conduct for parts of the public service, to investigate Government departments, and to advise the Government on the organisation of the public service.

The Commissioner has a statutory duty to act independently of Ministerial direction, except in matters concerning the appointment and dismissal of Departmental chief executives.

Regarding the appointment of Departmental chief executives, the Commissioner plays a key role. The Commissioner is responsible for:

- Notifying the responsible Minister or Ministers of the vacancy;
- Advertising the position;
- Assembling an interviewing panel which includes, at minimum, the Commissioner and his or her Deputy; the Commissioner may invite others in consultation with the Minister;
- Recommending the preferred candidate to the Minister, who will then refer the recommendation to the Governor-General in Council.

The Governor-General in Council may override the Commissioner's recommendation by appointing a different person to the vacant executive post.

A chief executive may not be appointed for any longer than five years. Under the State Services Act, the Commissioner negotiates terms and conditions of employment with each Departmental chief executive, subject to the approval of the Prime Minister and the Minister of State Services. The Commissioner may also recommend that a given chief executive be reappointed when the executive's contract expires, though the Government is free to ignore such a recommendation.

The Commissioner is empowered, with the agreement of the Government, to dismiss a Departmental chief executive, "for just cause or excuse". That is, the Government is by law forbidden from firing any chief executive or instructing a Commissioner to do so, but has the power to retain a chief executive against the Commissioner's advice.

=== Appointment, dismissal and term of office ===
The position of State Services Commissioner is one of the few positions in New Zealand's public service where Ministers are directly involved.

The appointment and dismissal procedures and the term of office are set forth in the State Sector Act 1988, as amended from time to time. Section 3 of the Act specifies that the Commissioner is to be appointed by the Governor-General in Council on the recommendation of the Prime Minister. Section 13 limits the term of office to five years, though this term may be further reduced in the Order in Council in which the appointment is made.

Section 17 of the Act lists a small number of circumstances in which the Commissioner is deemed to have resigned. Otherwise, the Commissioner is well protected. The Governor-General has no power to dismiss the Commissioner. The Governor-General may suspend the Commissioner under Section 16 for misbehaviour or incompetence, but must then explain why to the House of Representatives within seven sitting days; and even then the Commissioner is safe in his position unless the House resolves within three weeks after receiving the Governor-General's explanation to remove him or her from office. Otherwise, the Commissioner is restored to office.

=== History of the role ===
At the end of the first decade of the twentieth century, New Zealand's public sector was widely considered to be inefficient and wasteful. The incoming MacKenzie administration launched the Hunt Commission on the civil service. The Hunt Commission recommended the establishment of a Board of Management under Cabinet to have 'absolute and undisputed power' in 'all matters relating to the control and management of the Service – ... appointments, salaries, promotion, suspensions, dismissals, and indeed everything affecting officers – '.

==== Public Service Act 1912 ====
The Hunt Commission and its recommendations lead to the Public Service Act 1912 and the role of the Public Service Commissioner. The Act and the new Commissioner removed Ministers' direct involvement in appointments and personnel administration, separating the 'political' and 'administrative' functions, both in conduct of the Government's business and in management of the Public Service itself.

==== State Services Act 1962 ====
The State Services Act 1962 replaced the Public Service Commissioner with a multi-member Commission comprising a chairman and Commissioner. This point also marked a culture change towards a focus on political neutrality.

==== State Sector Act 1988 ====
The State Sector Act 1988 reverted to having a single State Services Commissioner, adding the position of Deputy State Services Commissioner. Ministers were granted some role in the appointments of departmental chief executives. There was some concern at the time that this would revert the system to a pre-1912 state.

Following the Review of the Centre in 2001, the State Sector Amendment Act (No 2) 2004 and the Crown Entities Act 2004 extended the role of the Commissioner beyond the Public Service to the wider State Services (such as Crown entities, but not Crown Research Institutes), and beyond State Services to the wider state sector.

=== List of commissioners ===
	Name	Portrait	Term of office	
As Public Service Commissioner
1	Donald Robertson		1913	1919
2	William R. Morris		1920	1923
3	Paul Verschaffelt		1923	1935
4	John H. Boyes (joint appointment)		1936	1938
5	Thomas Mark (joint appointment until 1938)		1936	1941
(4)	John H. Boyes		1941	1946
As Chairman of the Public Service Commission
6	Dick Campbell		1946	1953
7	George T. Bolt		1953	1958
8	Leonard A. Atkinson		1958	1962
As Chairman of the State Services Commission
(8)	Leonard A. Atkinson		1963	1966
9	Adrian G. Rodda		1967	1970
10	Ian G. Lythgoe		1971	1974
11	Robin Williams		1975	1981
12	Mervyn Probine		1981	1985
13	Roderick Deane		1985	1986
14	Don Hunn		1986	1987
As Chief Commissioner of the State Services Commission
(14)	Don Hunn		1988	1988
As State Services Commissioner
(14)	Don Hunn		1989	1997
15	Michael Wintringham		1997	2004
16	Mark Prebble		2004	2008
17	Iain Rennie		2008	2016
18	Peter Hughes		2016	2020
As Public Service Commissioner
(18)	Peter Hughes		2020	2024
19	Sir Brian Roche		2024	incumbent

=== Deputy Commissioner ===
The Public Service Act establishes the position of Deputy Public Service Commissioner, who is appointed on the same terms and conditions as the Commissioner.

	Name	Portrait	Term of office	
Deputy State Services Commissioner
	Helene Quilter		2007	2012
	Debbie Power		2015	2019
	Helene Quilter		2019	2020
Deputy Public Service Commissioner
1	Helene Quilter		2020	2023
2	Rebecca Kitteridge		2023	incumbent

== Ministers for the Public Service ==
Key

National Labour

No.	Name	Portrait	Term of Office		Time in office	Prime Minister
As Minister of State Services
1	Keith Holyoake		20 December 1963	9 February 1972	8 years, 51 days	Holyoake
2	Jack Marshall		9 February 1972	8 December 1972	303 days	Marshall
3	Bob Tizard		8 December 1972	10 September 1974	1 year, 276 days	Kirk
4	Arthur Faulkner		10 September 1974	12 December 1975	1 year, 93 days	Rowling
5	Peter Gordon		12 December 1975	13 December 1978	3 years, 1 day	Muldoon
6	David Thomson		13 December 1978	26 July 1984	5 years, 226 days	Muldoon
7	Stan Rodger		26 July 1984	9 February 1990	5 years, 198 days	Lange
7	Stan Rodger		26 July 1984	9 February 1990	5 years, 198 days	Palmer
8	Clive Matthewson		9 February 1990	2 November 1990	266 days	Palmer
8	Clive Matthewson		9 February 1990	2 November 1990	266 days	Moore
9	Bill Birch		2 November 1990	29 November 1993	3 years, 27 days	Bolger
10	Paul East		29 November 1993	16 December 1996	3 years, 17 days	Bolger
11	Jenny Shipley		16 December 1996	12 September 1997	270 days	Bolger
(10)	Paul East		12 September 1997	8 December 1997	87 days	Bolger
12	Simon Upton		8 December 1997	10 December 1999	2 years, 2 days	Shipley
13	Trevor Mallard		10 December 1999	19 October 2005	5 years, 313 days	Clark
14	Annette King		19 October 2005	2 November 2007	2 years, 14 days	Clark
15	David Parker		5 November 2007	19 November 2008	1 year, 14 days	Clark
16	Tony Ryall		19 November 2008	13 December 2011	3 years, 24 days	Key
17	Jonathan Coleman		14 December 2011	8 October 2014	2 years, 298 days	Key
18	Paula Bennett		8 October 2014	26 October 2017	3 years, 18 days	
18	Paula Bennett		8 October 2014	26 October 2017	3 years, 18 days	English
19	Chris Hipkins		26 October 2017	6 November 2020	3 years, 11 days	Ardern
As Minister for the Public Service
(19)	Chris Hipkins		6 November 2020	25 January 2023	2 years, 80 days	Ardern
20	Andrew Little		1 February 2023	27 November 2023	299 days	Hipkins
21	Nicola Willis		27 November 2023	24 January 2025	1 year, 58 days	Luxon
22	Judith Collins		24 January 2025	7 April 2026	1 year, 73 days	Luxon
23	Paul Goldsmith		7 April 2026	Present	141 days	Luxon
