= George Black (New Zealand politician) =

New Zealand politician

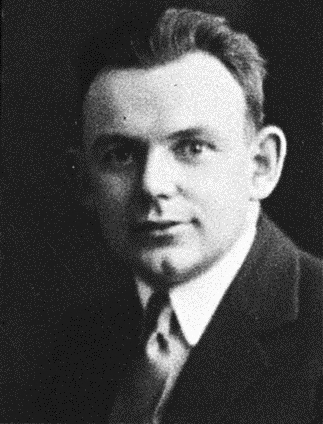

Member of the New Zealand Parliament for Motueka
- In office 14 November 1928 – 17 October 1932
- Preceded by: Richard Hudson
- Succeeded by: Keith Holyoake

Personal details
- Born: George Charles Cecil Black; 21 November 1903 Reefton, New Zealand
- Died: 17 October 1932 (aged 28) Makara, New Zealand
- Party: United

George Charles Cecil Black (21 November 1903 – 17 October 1932) was a member of the House of Representatives for Motueka electorate, in the South Island of New Zealand, initially as a representative of the United Party and from early 1931 as an independent. He committed suicide and was succeeded as MP by Keith Holyoake.

== Early life ==
Born in Reefton on 21 November 1903, Black was the son of George James and Marianne Catherine Black. In 1923, Black became a Parliamentary Clerk of Committees.

== Member of Parliament ==
New Zealand Parliament
Years	Term	Electorate	Party
1928–1931	23rd	Motueka	United
1931	Changed allegiance to:		Independent
1931–1932	24th	Motueka	Independent

Black represented the Motueka electorate in the House of Representatives from 1928 to 1932.

In the 1928 election, aged only 24, he stood as a United Party candidate and follower of Sir Joseph Ward and was successful. He unexpectedly beat the Reform Party incumbent of 14 years, Richard Hudson, and became the youngest MP at the time. He was appointed junior whip by the United Party.

In Parliament, Black refused to support the Finance Bill that proposed cuts to public service salaries and voted with the Labour Party, and in January 1931 he also opposed the decision to suspend construction of the Kawatiri–Inangahua railway line that ran through his electorate. Black was expelled from the United Party the day after voting against the Finance Bill in March 1931, saying that "no genuine supporter of the late Prime Minister", Sir Joseph Ward, could uphold such measures.

Later in the year, at the 1931 election, Black was elected as an independent. He was associated with Harry Atmore, the independent MP for the neighbouring Nelson electorate.

On 17 October 1932 aged 28, Black committed suicide with cyanide poison at Mākara Beach. He was survived by his wife and their child. The coroner found that Black had been mentally unstable for some months, and was also in financial difficulties.

Black's death triggered the 1932 Motueka by-election, which was won by Keith Holyoake.

== See also ==
- List of members of the New Zealand Parliament who died in office
- Nelson railway proposals

New Zealand Parliament
Preceded by Richard Hudson	Member of Parliament for Motueka; 1928–1932	Succeeded by Keith Holyoake
