= Keith Holyoake =

New Zealand politician (1904–1983)

The Right Honourable Sir Keith Holyoake KG GCMG CH QSO
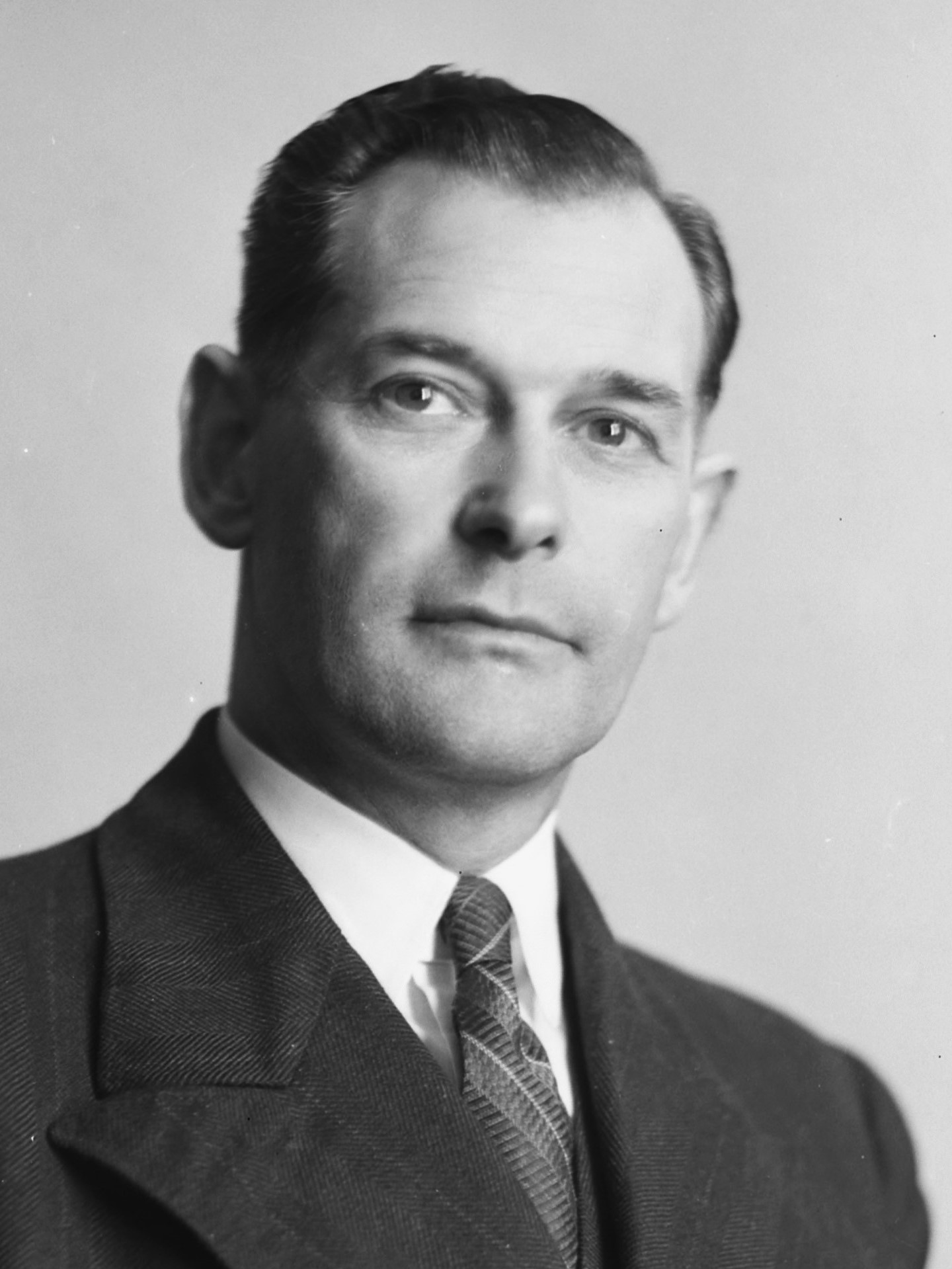
- Holyoake, c. 1960

13th Governor-General of New Zealand
- In office 26 October 1977 – 25 October 1980
- Monarch: Elizabeth II
- Prime Minister: Robert Muldoon
- Preceded by: Denis Blundell
- Succeeded by: David Beattie

26th Prime Minister of New Zealand
- In office 12 December 1960 – 7 February 1972
- Monarch: Elizabeth II
- Governors-General: Charles Lyttelton; Bernard Fergusson; Arthur Porritt
- Deputy: Jack Marshall
- Preceded by: Walter Nash
- Succeeded by: Jack Marshall
- In office 20 September 1957 – 12 December 1957
- Monarch: Elizabeth II
- Governor-General: Charles Lyttelton
- Deputy: Jack Marshall
- Preceded by: Sidney Holland
- Succeeded by: Walter Nash

17th Leader of the Opposition
- In office 12 December 1957 – 12 December 1960
- Prime Minister: Walter Nash
- Deputy: Jack Marshall
- Preceded by: Walter Nash
- Succeeded by: Walter Nash
Other Ministerial roles
15th Minister of Foreign Affairs
In office 12 December 1960 – 8 December 1972
Prime Minister	Himself; Jack Marshall
Preceded by	Walter Nash
Succeeded by	Norman Kirk
1st Deputy Prime Minister of New Zealand
In office 13 December 1949 – 20 September 1957
Prime Minister	Sidney Holland
Preceded by	Office created
Succeeded by	Jack Marshall
19th Minister of Agriculture
In office 13 December 1949 – 26 September 1957
Prime Minister	Sidney Holland
Preceded by	Ted Cullen
Succeeded by	Sid Smith

Member of the New Zealand Parliament for Pahiatua
- In office 25 September 1943 – 10 March 1977
- Preceded by: Alfred Ransom
- Succeeded by: John Falloon

Member of the New Zealand Parliament for Motueka
- In office 1 December 1932 – 15 October 1938
- Preceded by: George Black
- Succeeded by: Jerry Skinner

Personal details
- Born: 11 February 1904 Mangamutu, New Zealand
- Died: 8 December 1983 (aged 79) Wellington, New Zealand
- Party: Reform; National (after 1936)
- Spouse: Norma Janet Ingram (m. 1934)
- Children: 5
- Parent(s): Henry Victor Holyoake; Esther Eves
- Relatives: Ken Comber (son-in-law)

Sir Keith Jacka Holyoake (11 February 1904 – 8 December 1983) was a New Zealand politician who served as the 26th prime minister of New Zealand, serving for a brief period in 1957 and then from 1960 to 1972, and also as the 13th governor-general of New Zealand, serving from 1977 to 1980. He is the only New Zealand politician to have held both positions. (Note: Sir George Grey served as both governor of New Zealand and premier of New Zealand in the 19th century, but Holyoake is the only person to have served in both capacities since the viceregal post was renamed governor-general in 1917.)

Holyoake was born near Pahiatua in the Wairarapa. He left formal education at the age of 12 to help on the family farm. Before entering politics, he was active in various local farming associations. He was first elected to Parliament in 1932 for the Motueka electorate, representing the conservative Reform Party. Having played an instrumental role in the formation of the National Party in 1936, he lost his seat two years later. However, he was then earmarked for the safe seat of Pahiatua, which he held from 1943.

Following National's first election victory, Holyoake entered Cabinet in 1949. In 1954, he was appointed the first deputy prime minister of New Zealand, under Sidney Holland. Holyoake became leader of the National Party and prime minister two months before the 1957 election, after Holland's resignation due to ill health. Following an election defeat, he served as the leader of the Opposition for three years before National returned to power in 1960.

Holyoake's government rewrote the criminal legal code, passing the Crimes Act 1961. One of the main features of that act was the abolition of capital punishment, though only ten National MPs voted for its abolition. Among many conservative reforms, his government introduced a form of "voluntary unionism". In foreign policy, Holyoake supported the United States and sent troops to Vietnam. He led his party to four consecutive election victories (not since surpassed). In 1972, he resigned as prime minister to ease the succession for his deputy and friend, Jack Marshall.

In 1977, the National government of Robert Muldoon created controversy by appointing Holyoake as governor-general. Opponents argued that a former politician should not hold the non-partisan position. Holyoake's term was limited to three years, not the normal five. In 1980, he became a Knight Companion of the Order of the Garter, a rare honour.

Holyoake is the third-longest-serving New Zealand prime minister (just under 12 years), surpassed only by Richard Seddon's 13 years and William Massey's close to 13 years. Holyoake was also the first to be born in the 20th century. Known for his diplomatic style and "plummy" voice, he was also fondly (or mockingly) known as "Kiwi Keith", a name given to him in childhood to distinguish him from an Australian cousin with the same name.

== Early life ==
Holyoake was born at Mangamutu, a short distance from Pahiatua, a town in New Zealand's Wairarapa region, the son of Henry Victor Holyoake and Esther Eves. Keith Holyoake's great-grandparents, Richard and Eliza Holyoake, settled at Riwaka near Motueka in 1843, and his maternal great-grandparents, William and Sarah Eves, arrived in Nelson in 1842. Relatives of the 19th-century secularist George Holyoake, the Holyoakes ran a small general store at Mangamutu, and then lived for a time in both Hastings and Tauranga, before settling on the family farm at Riwaka, following the death of Keith's grandfather in 1913.

Holyoake was raised in the Plymouth Brethren church, and his social life as a child was very restricted. From the age of 12, having left school after his father's death, Holyoake worked on the family hop and tobacco farm in Riwaka. His mother had trained as a school teacher, and continued his education at home. After taking over the management of the farm, he became involved in various local farming associations, something that increased his interest in politics.

== Early political career ==
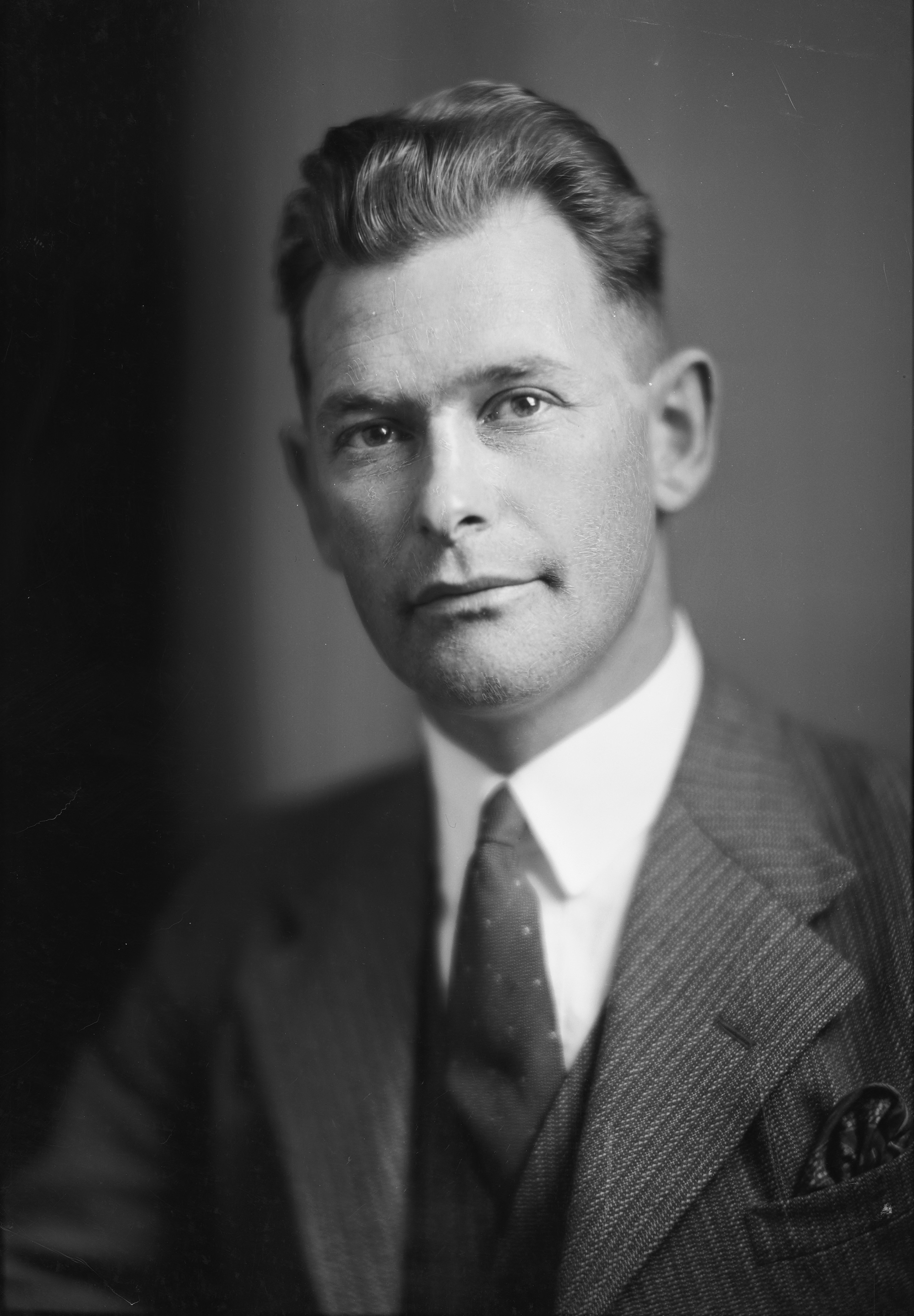
Holyoake in 1933, age 29

New Zealand Parliament
Years	Term	Electorate	Party
1932–1935	24th	Motueka	Reform
1935–1936	25th	Motueka	Reform
1936–1938	Changed allegiance to:		National
1943–1946	27th	Pahiatua	National
1946–1949	28th	Pahiatua	National
1949–1951	29th	Pahiatua	National
1951–1954	30th	Pahiatua	National
1954–1957	31st	Pahiatua	National
1957–1960	32nd	Pahiatua	National
1960–1963	33rd	Pahiatua	National
1963–1966	34th	Pahiatua	National
1966–1969	35th	Pahiatua	National
1969–1972	36th	Pahiatua	National
1972–1975	37th	Pahiatua	National
1975–1977	38th	Pahiatua	National

The Reform Party, which had strong rural support, selected Holyoake as its candidate for the Motueka seat in the 1931 election. The incumbent MP, George Black, held the seat, but died the following year. Holyoake was the Reform Party's candidate in the resulting by-election in 1932, and was successful. He became the youngest Member of Parliament at the time, at the age of 28. In 1935, he was awarded the King George V Silver Jubilee Medal.

In the 1935 election, Holyoake retained his seat under the motto "Follow England and Vote Holyoake" despite a massive swing against the United–Reform Coalition. In the aftermath of this election, he played a key role in transforming the coalition into the modern National Party. He very quickly gained considerable respect from his colleagues, and was regarded as a rising star in the new party. The 1937 electoral redistribution was unfavourable for him and, when the boundary changes applied at the 1938 election, Holyoake lost his seat to a rising star of the governing Labour Party, Jerry Skinner. Holyoake had been discussed as a possible successor to the party's conscientious but lack-lustre leader, Adam Hamilton but, because Holyoake was no longer an MP, that ceased to be an option.

In 1943, Holyoake returned to Parliament as MP for Pahiatua, having been lined up by National for that nomination. In 1946, he became the party's deputy Leader.

== First National Government: 1949–1957 ==
When National won the 1949 election and formed the First National Government, new Prime Minister Sidney Holland appointed Holyoake as Deputy Prime Minister and Minister of Agriculture. Holyoake was also for a year (1949–50) Minister for Scientific and Industrial Research, and was Minister of Marketing until the department was abolished in 1953. In 1953, Holyoake was awarded the Queen Elizabeth II Coronation Medal.

As Minister of Agriculture for eight years Holyoake enhanced his reputation as a level-headed good administrator. Farm mechanisation was encouraged, the "extermination policy" achieved nearly eliminated the rabbit pest. Dismantling of marketing producer controls was completed.

Holyoake twice went to London to re-negotiate price levels on meat and wool products, and in 1955 attended the Food and Agriculture Organization conference in Rome. On his return to New Zealand he visited India and the Soviet Union to seek alternative markets for New Zealand, although his trip bore little fruit. In 1957, he led a delegation seeking to protect New Zealand's access to the British market, without notable success.

As Deputy leader of the National Party, Holyoake was acting prime minister whenever Holland was overseas. In recognition of that, he was made a member of the Privy Council in 1954. After the 1954 election, Holland made him the first person to be formally appointed Deputy Prime Minister.

In 1953, in partnership with his friend Theodore Nisbet Gibbs and Gibbs' son Ian, Holyoake purchased a block of land on the northern shore of Lake Taupō from Ian's employer. The land, which had previously been purchased from Ngāti Tūwharetoa iwi in 1884, was a block of 5,385 acres largely covered in scrub and fern. Holyoake and Gibbs subsequently developed the land into a town called Kinloch, which became a holiday destination. On his deathbed, Holyoake said that Kinloch was his proudest achievement.

=== First premiership ===
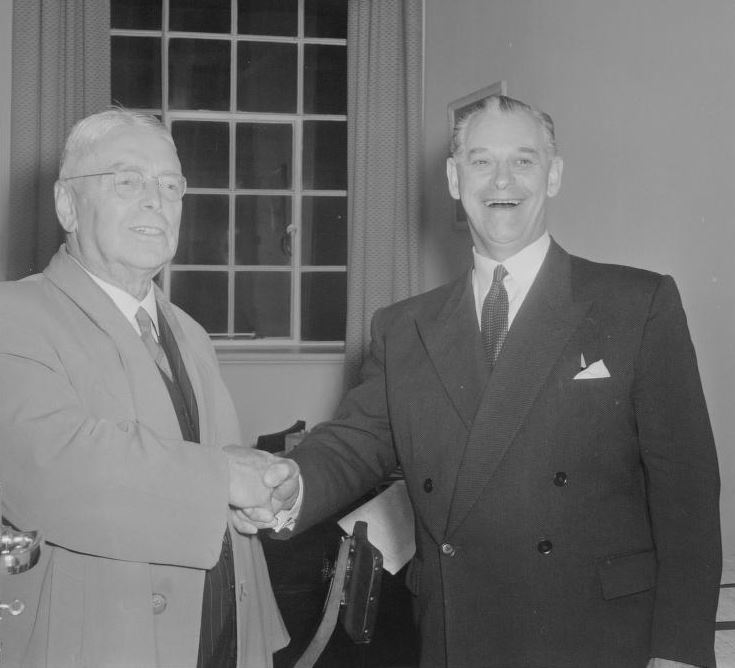
Holyoake (right) congratulating Walter Nash on Labour's victory in the 1957 election

Holyoake became Prime Minister two months before the 1957 election, when incumbent Prime Minister Sidney Holland retired due to ill-health. Holland had been in declining health since 1954, and had never recovered from a mild heart attack or stroke in 1956. Holyoake also became Minister of Māori Affairs on the retirement of Ernest Corbett.

Holyoake had little time to establish himself, and lost to the Walter Nash-led Labour Party by a margin of two seats. Holyoake became Leader of the Opposition for the next three years.

== Second National Government: 1960–1972 ==
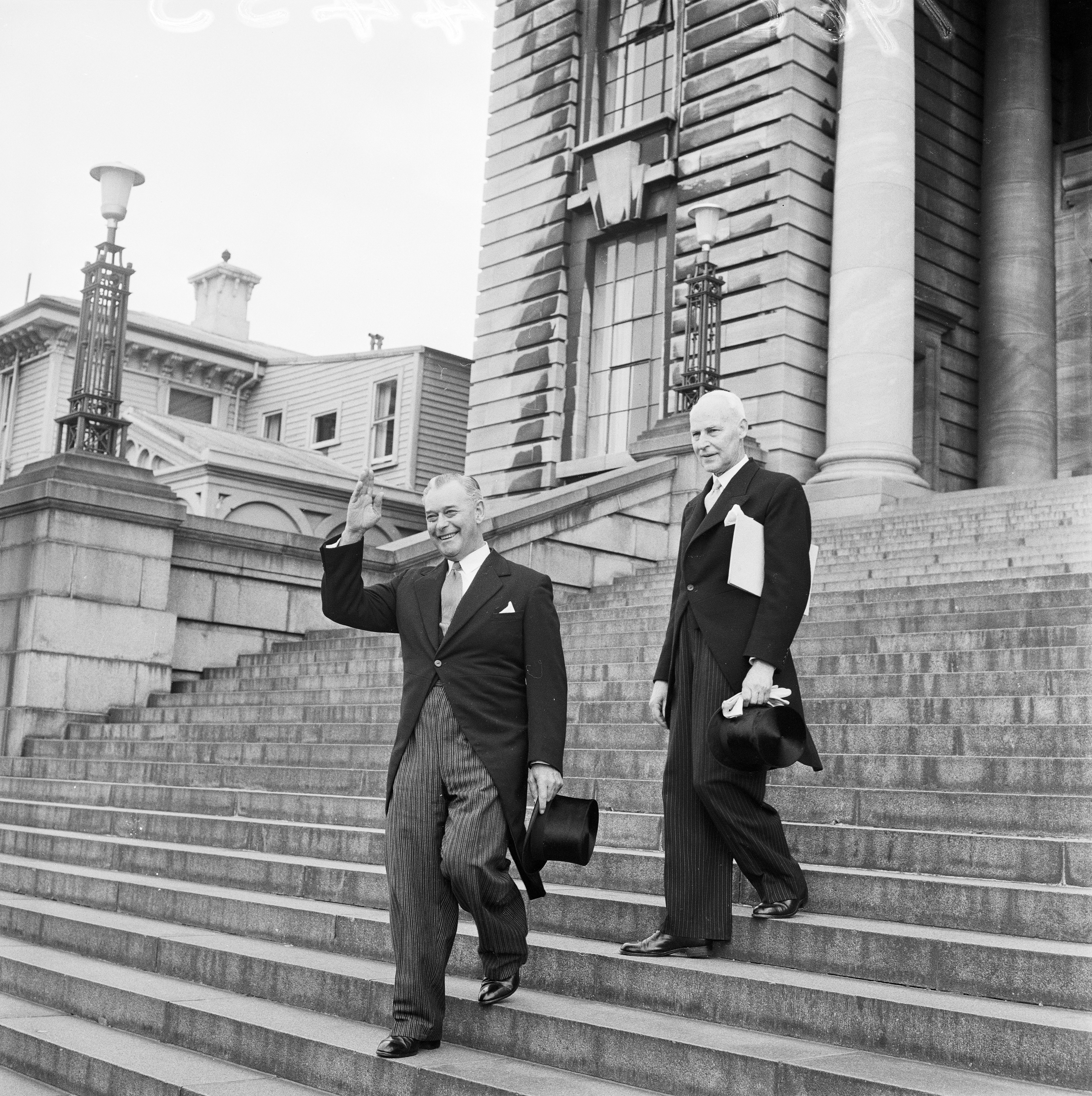
Prime Minister-elect Holyoake leaving Parliament Buildings with the Clerk of the Executive Council, on the way to Government House. Photographed on 12 December 1960 by an Evening Post staff photographer.

In the 1960 election, the National Party returned to power and formed the Second National Government. Historians attribute the victory to Holyoake's skilful campaigning, particularly his attacks on Minister of Finance Arnold Nordmeyer's so-called "Black Budget" of 1958, which had increased taxes on petrol, cigarettes and liquor. He also served as his own Minister of Foreign Affairs.

=== Second premiership ===
The Holyoake government implemented numerous reforms of the public services and government institutions: for example, it created the Office of the Ombudsman and numerous quasi-autonomous non-governmental organisations, and strengthened parliamentary scrutiny of the executive. Public broadcasting was removed from direct government oversight and placed under corporation control. Holyoake's government rewrote the criminal legal code, passing the Crimes Act 1961; the Act abolished capital punishment, though only ten National MPs voted for its abolition. In 1969, the Security Intelligence Service (SIS) was formally acknowledged to exist, and its minister, the prime minister, publicly acknowledged. That same year the New Zealand Parliament passed an Act covering the agency's functions and responsibilities: the New Zealand Security Intelligence Service Act.

In 1960, the Holyoake government published the "Hunn Report", a wide-ranging summary of Māori assets, and the state of Māori in New Zealand at the time. The report was a damning indictment of past governments' neglect of Māori within society, and Holyoake endeavoured to act on its findings. By embracing the No Maoris – No Tour cause, Holyoake ended the practice of an apartheid sporting body dictating the racial composition of New Zealand rugby teams touring in South Africa. In a 1966 speech directed at the South African authorities, Holyoake delicately defended the principle of racial equality, stating "in this country we are one people; as such we cannot as a nation be truly represented in any sphere by a group chosen on racial lines".

Holyoake accepted the post-war political consensus; he believed in the necessity of a mixed economy, championing a Keynesian strategy of public investment to maintain demand. However, as an anti-socialist, Holyoake sought to reduce the role of trade unions in industrial relations. The National government introduced a form of voluntary unionism, though the majority of industrial workplaces remained unionised; the policy was hotly debated within caucus, with Holyoake's deputy, Jack Marshall, and Tom Shand, favouring the retention of compulsory unionism. His government's industrial policy brought Holyoake into conflict with union leaders, such as Fintan Patrick Walsh.

Holyoake's government was comfortably re-elected for a second consecutive term in 1963. Holyoake's second term featured by a long period of prosperity and economic expansion. However, moves by the United Kingdom to join the European Economic Community challenged his government. Holyoake deliberately played down the issue, and chose not to vocally oppose British membership of the EEC. A significant step towards diversification was a limited free trade agreement with Australia, negotiated in 1965 by Holyoake's minister of overseas trade, Jack Marshall, who later also negotiated the terms of the arrangements for New Zealand under which Britain joined the EEC.

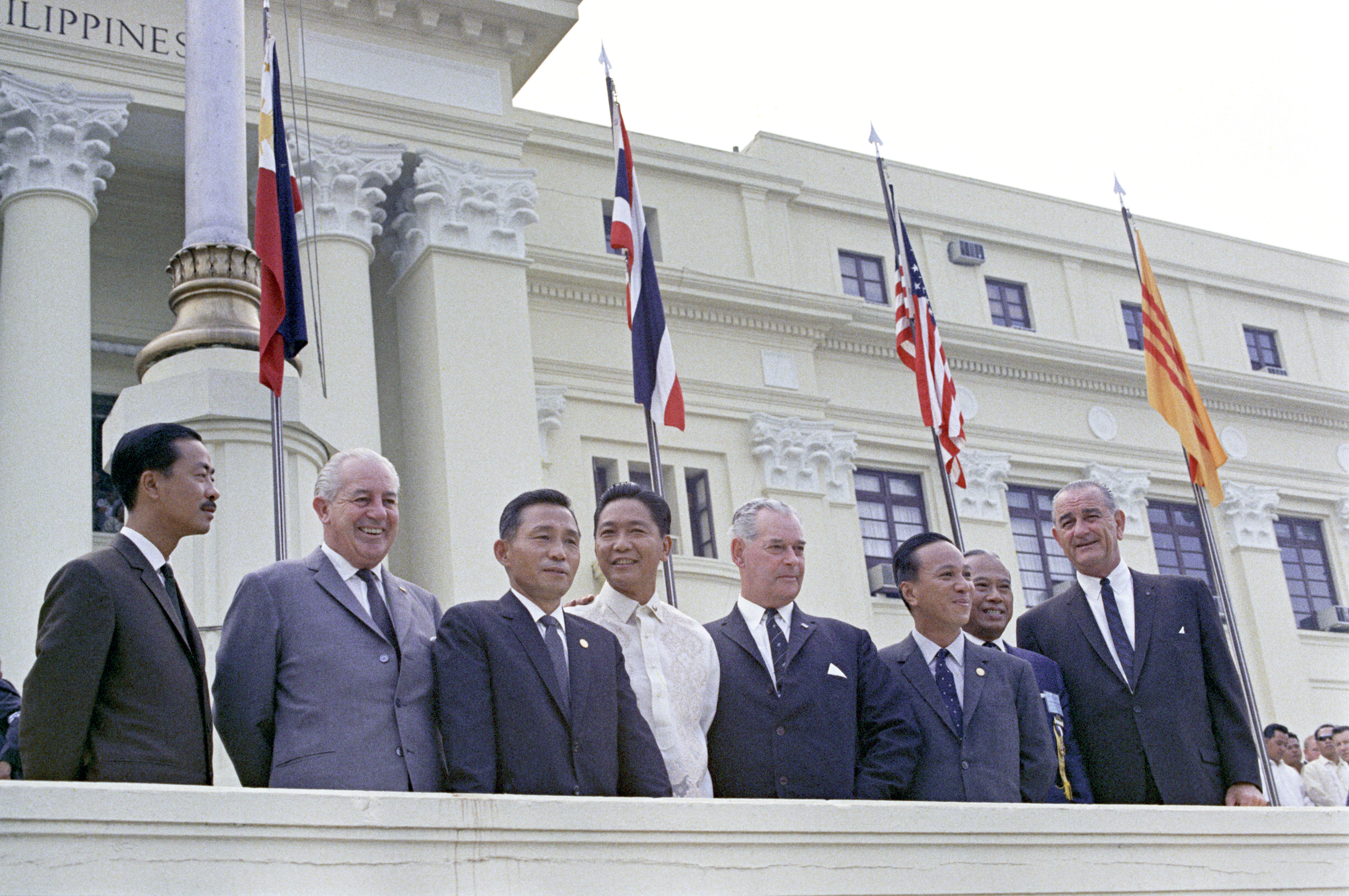
Holyoake (fifth from the left) at the Manila Summit Conference, outside the Old Legislative Building in Manila, Philippines on 24 October 1966.

More controversial were the Holyoake government's relations with the United States at the start of the Vietnam War. The National government's initial response was carefully considered and characterised by Holyoake's cautiousness towards the entire Vietnam question. The fundamental issues, Holyoake said, were simple: "Whose will is to prevail in South Vietnam the imposed will of the North Vietnamese communists and their agents, or the freely expressed will of the people of South Vietnam?" His government preferred minimal involvement, with other South East Asian deployments already having a strain on the New Zealand Defence Force. New Zealand's alliance with the United States was an issue in the 1966 election, which the National Party won on the back of.

Beginning in mid-1960s, the New Zealand government protested against French nuclear weapons testing in the Pacific region. In 1963, Holyoake announced the policy of banning the storage or testing of nuclear weapons within New Zealand territory.

As the prime minister during the Apollo 11 Moon landing, he contributed to messages from 73 world leaders that were etched into a silicon disc left on the surface of the Moon. The disc was left in the Sea of Tranquility by Buzz Aldrin.

Holyoake led his party to a narrow and unexpected victory in the 1969 election. Two years prior Holyoake appointed a rising backbencher, Robert Muldoon as Minister of Finance in 1967, although ranked him lowly in his Cabinet. In response to falling wool prices and balance of payment problems, Muldoon introduced mini-budgets with Holyoake's approval.

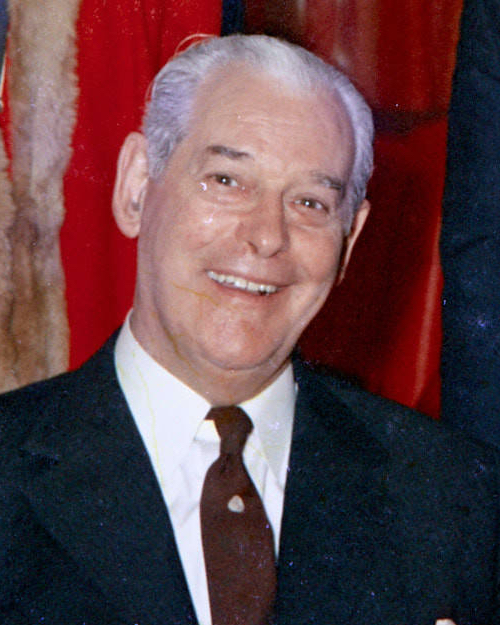
Holyoake in 1971

The National government was humiliated in early 1970 in a disastrous by-election for the once-safe National seat of Marlborough, triggered by the death of longtime minister Tom Shand. Having already received the customary appointment as Member of the Order of the Companions of Honour, Holyoake was knighted as a Knight Grand Cross of the Order of St Michael and St George in the 1970 Queen's Birthday Honours. Political commentators speculated about when Holyoake would retire, and by the early 1970s his closest allies, including Jack Marshall, were privately encouraging him to step down. The government was increasingly perceived as careworn and unfocused—two of its strongest ministers, Shand and Ralph Hanan, had died in 1969, and the party caucus was increasingly divided. After more than a decade in power and almost four decades in Parliament, Holyoake's dogged conservatism appeared out of touch with an increasingly liberal society. It was not until 1972, just before a statutory general election, that he finally resigned. By then, he had become the senior statesman of the Commonwealth. Marshall succeeded him in the ensuing leadership ballot, and Holyoake remained in Cabinet as Minister of Foreign Affairs until National lost office at the end of the year.

== Retirement ==
When National under Marshall was defeated at the 1972 election, Holyoake remained prominent in opposition. Marshall retained him on the frontbench and appointed him Shadow Minister of Foreign Affairs. He became doubtful of Marshall's chance to regain government with time and threw his influence with the caucus behind Marshall's deputy Muldoon. In 1974 Marshall resigned as leader after realising that many of his colleagues (including Holyoake) no longer had confidence in him and Muldoon was elected in his place. Holyoake played an active part in the campaign for the 1975 election, which saw National regain power again under Muldoon. Muldoon appointed Holyoake to the specially-created sinecure of Minister of State.

== Governor-general ==
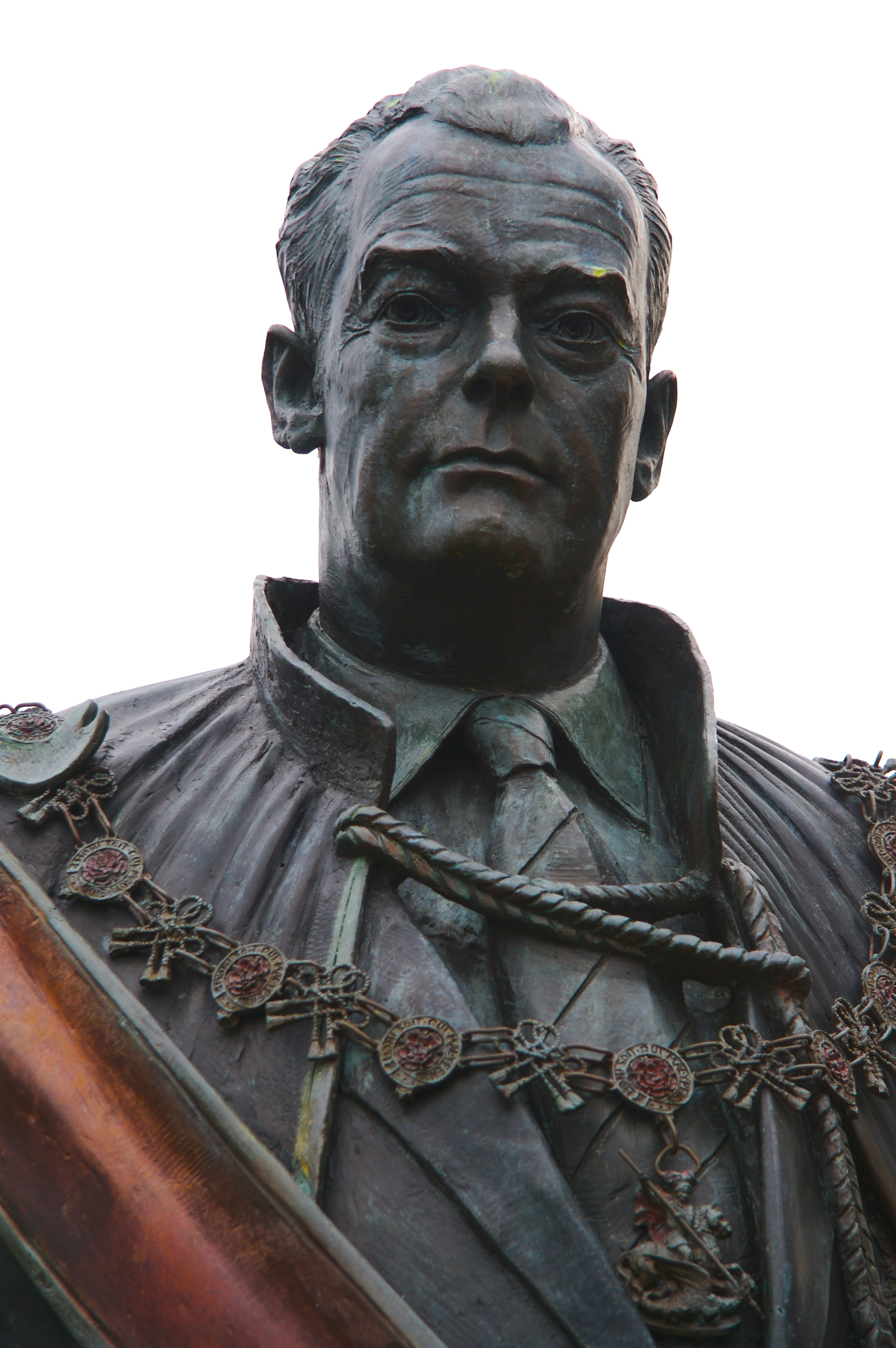
A statue of Holyoake outside the State Services Commission, Molesworth Street, Wellington

In 1977, Holyoake was unexpectedly and controversially appointed Governor-General of New Zealand by Queen Elizabeth II on the advice of the then Prime Minister Robert Muldoon. The announcement was made by the Queen at the end of her tour of New Zealand on 7 March 1977, from the Royal Yacht HMY Britannia in Lyttelton Harbour.

This choice was deemed controversial by some, as Holyoake was a sitting Cabinet minister and a former prime minister. Many opponents of Muldoon's government claimed that it was a political appointment. The Leader of the Opposition, Bill Rowling (himself a former prime minister) stated that he would remove Holyoake as governor-general if the Labour Party won the 1978 election, and openly suggested that he would have appointed Sir Edmund Hillary as governor-general. That suggestion was, in turn, criticised by the government, as Hillary had backed Labour in 1975 as part of the "Citizens for Rowling" campaign.

As a result of the appointment, Holyoake resigned from Parliament, leading to the Pahiatua by-election of 1977. He was succeeded from his seat by John Falloon.

Holyoake's conduct while in office, however, was acknowledged to be fair and balanced. In particular, Holyoake refused to comment on the 1978 general election, which gave Labour a narrow plurality of votes but a majority of seats in parliament to National. Social Credit leader Bruce Beetham said Holyoake as governor-general had "...a scrupulous impartiality that confounded the critics of his appointment". His term as governor-general was only for three years, on account of his age. Usually, governors-general serve for five years, but Holyoake was the oldest governor-general to date (at 73 years old). His term ended in 1980.

== Personal life ==
Holyoake twice married Norma Janet Ingram: first in a civil ceremony on 24 September 1934, and again on 11 January 1935 at their Presbyterian church in Motueka. The couple had five children: two sons and three daughters. His daughter Diane married National MP Ken Comber. In the 1980 Queen's Birthday Honours, Norma, Lady Holyoake, was appointed a Dame Commander of the Order of St Michael and St George, for public services since 1935.

Holyoake also had a very close and somewhat paternalistic friendship with Marilyn Waring, National's youngest female MP during her tenure. Holyoake cared for her deeply. They first met in 1974 when she, annoyed by the refusal of Labour Prime Minister, Norman Kirk, to support National MP Venn Young's bill to decriminalise homosexuality, joined the National Party. She quickly entered the Opposition Research Unit as a part-time advisor under George Gair, the Shadow Minister of Housing. At age 22, she expressed some interest in standing for the party in the seat of Raglan, a very safe National seat that contained her hometown of Huntly. Holyoake, so overjoyed that a woman was willing to run for National in a safe "blue" seat, personally arrived within the hour to Parliament House and offered her the selection without even formally introducing himself. The two thereafter became very close, to the extent that on one occasion she kissed Holyoake on the lips in front of cameras. She is thought to have helped soften Holyoake's ambivalent views on LGBT rights. After she was involuntarily outed by the New Zealand Truth in 1978, Holyoake worked with Prime Minister, Robert Muldoon, to quickly downplay the tabloid reports and to protect their friend.

== Death ==
Holyoake died on 8 December 1983, aged 79, in Wellington. His state funeral took place on 13 December 1983 in Wellington Cathedral of St Paul.

== Decorations, awards and memberships ==
- Member of Her Majesty's Most Honourable Privy Council (PC), 1954 New Year Honours List
- Freeman of the City of London
- Doctor of Laws, Honoris Causa, Victoria University of Wellington, New Zealand
- Doctor of Laws (Agric), Honoris Causa, Seoul National University, South Korea
- Member of the Order of the Companions of Honour (CH), 1963 New Year Honours List
- Knight of the Most Venerable Order of St John of Jerusalem (KStJ)
- Knight Grand Cross of the Order of St Michael and St George (GCMG), 1970
- Companion of the Queen's Service Order
- Knight Companion of the Order of the Garter (KG), 1980

== Coat of arms ==
Coat of arms of Sir Keith Holyoake, KG, GCMG, CH, QSO, KStJ, PC
Notes The arms of Keith Holyoake consist of: Crest A Kiwi supporting with the dexter claw a Māori whale-bone patu-parāoa proper ensigned by a representation of the Royal Crown. Escutcheon Per pale Or and Gules, on a Mount in base Counterchanged a Holly Tree Gules fructed Or dimidiating an Oak Tree Or fructed Gules, two apples slipped in chief and a like apple in base all Counterchanged. Supporters On the dexter side an Aberdeen Angus Bull supporting a Mace representing that of the New Zealand House of Representatives, and on the sinister side a Coopworth Ram supporting a Black Rod representing that of the New Zealand Parliament, all proper. Motto BE ZEALOUS COMPASSIONATE AND LOYAL Orders Order of the Garter; Order of St Michael and St George

== Footnotes ==
=== References ===
New Zealand Parliament
Preceded by George Black	Member of Parliament for Motueka; 1932–1938	Succeeded by Jerry Skinner
New constituency	Member of Parliament for Pahiatua; 1943–1977	Succeeded by John Falloon
Government offices
Preceded by Sidney Holland	Prime Minister of New Zealand; 1957; 1960–1972	Succeeded by Walter Nash
Preceded by Walter Nash	Prime Minister of New Zealand; 1957; 1960–1972	Succeeded by Jack Marshall
New title	Deputy Prime Minister of New Zealand; 1949–1957	Succeeded by Jack Marshall
Preceded by Sir Denis Blundell	Governor-General of New Zealand; 1977–1980	Succeeded by Sir David Beattie
