= Eddie Isbey =

New Zealand politician

Eddie Isbey QSO

Member of the New Zealand Parliament for Papatoetoe
- In office 25 November 1978 – 15 August 1987
- Preceded by: Constituency created
- Succeeded by: Ross Robertson

Member of the New Zealand Parliament for Grey Lynn
- In office 29 November 1969 – 25 November 1978
- Preceded by: Ritchie Macdonald
- Succeeded by: Constituency abolished

Personal details
- Born: Edward Emanuel Isbey; 3 August 1917 London, England
- Died: 25 July 1995 (aged 77) Auckland, New Zealand
- Party: Labour
- Spouse: Annette Constance Graham
- Children: 3

Edward Emanuel Isbey QSO (3 August 1917 – 25 July 1995) was a New Zealand politician of the Labour Party.

== Biography ==
=== Early life and career ===
Isbey was born in London in 1917, the son of Alec Isbey a tailor who immigrated from Lithuania. He received his education in London and gained a diploma in industrial management. During World War II, he served in the Merchant Navy. For 17 years he worked on a whale factory ship in the Antarctic Ocean. He emigrated to New Zealand in 1947.

Isbey was a clothing factory manager from 1948 to 1953, then went into dairy farming in Mercer and later Hokianga, before working on the waterfront (1954–1969). In 1955 he stood successfully for election to the executive of the Auckland Watersiders Union and in 1956 he was elected vice-president before being elected president several months later after the sudden resignation of Bill Hooker. At the 1956 local-body elections he stood as a Labour Party candidate for the Auckland Harbour Board in the Auckland City district, but was unsuccessful. He was then elected the president of the New Zealand Watersiders Union, retaining the role for 11 years from 1959 to 1970 in conjunction with being the Auckland president for 12 years from 1956 to 1967. As president he led the Auckland Watersiders to affiliate with the Labour Party. In 1963 the union voted with a two-to-one majority to formally affiliate via a postal ballot. He was a close friend and associate of leading unionists such as Tom Skinner and Jim Knox.

He was also the vice-president of New Zealand Rugby League and an administrator of several theatres in Auckland including the board of the Mercury Theatre and the Auckland Theatre Trust. He was also the chairman of the special committee of the New Zealand Shipping Corporation.

=== Political career ===
New Zealand Parliament
Years	Term	Electorate	Party
1969–1972	36th	Grey Lynn	Labour
1972–1975	37th	Grey Lynn	Labour
1975–1978	38th	Grey Lynn	Labour
1978–1981	39th	Papatoetoe	Labour
1981–1984	40th	Papatoetoe	Labour
1984–1987	41st	Papatoetoe	Labour

He joined the Labour Party upon arriving in New Zealand (his parents having been active members of the Labour Party in London) and served as a delegate to the Auckland Labour Representation Committee and later the Auckland Labour Regional Council.

He was selected as the Labour candidate for the electorate of Grey Lynn ahead of the 1969 election. He was successful and resigned his trade union roles after entering parliament. Initially he found it hard to transition from a union spokesperson to a parliamentary backbencher. In the lead up to the 1972 election Labour leader Norman Kirk sent Isbey to Tokoroa to pacify striking timber workers and prevent the issue interfering with the election.

After Labour won the 1972 election, Isbey put himself forward for a seat in the cabinet of the Third Labour Government. In the ensuing caucus ballot he polled reasonably well, but after nine other Auckland MPs were elected to cabinet the subsequent voting reflected a concern for regional representation and neither Isbey or any other Aucklander was elected for the remaining positions. However he was appointed as a Parliamentary Under-Secretary to the Minister of Labour, Minister of Civil Aviation & Meteorological Services and Minister of Transport from 1973 to 1974 by Norman Kirk. When Bill Rowling became Prime Minister he appointed Isbey Under-Secretary to the Minister of Railways.

In 1973 he was elected vice-president of the Labour Party, after withdrawing from the ballot for president in favour of Charles Bennett. His win was something of a surprise with Stan Rodger, President of the Public Service Association, seen as the front-runner. Other aspirants were Ron Barclay, Roger Drayton, Jonathan Hunt, Gerald O'Brien and Trevor Young (all MPs). As vice-president he pledged himself to bring about greater unity between the industrial and political wings of the Labour movement.

When Labour was in opposition (1975–84) Isbey was shadow minister for Labour, Immigration, the Arts and Sport and Recreation. He was one of the earliest proponents of nuclear-free legislation. He introduced a bill to make New Zealand nuclear-free in 1976 but it was voted down by the Muldoon Government. Later, in 1982 Isbey received a public anti-nuclear petition when it was presented to parliament.

In 1977, Isbey received the Queen Elizabeth II Silver Jubilee Medal.

In 1978 his seat of Grey Lynn was abolished, absorbed mostly into Auckland Central, in an electoral redistribution. In danger of his political career being ended by a redistribution, he was given the unflattering nickname Eddie 'Was-bey'. He stood against Labour's incumbent Auckland Central MP, Richard Prebble, for the nomination but was beaten by Prebble. He then set his sights on unrelated seats after allegedly being promised "we will find you a safe seat Eddie" by the party hierarchy. Isbey put himself forward for the seat of Te Atatu before withdrawing at the last moment on a tip he would win the Waitakere nomination. However he was defeated in an upset by Ralph Maxwell. After the initial selection for Papatoetoe was deadlocked between Mike Moore and Colin Moyle, Isbey was invited to contest the seat at the second selection meeting and was successful.

He won the Papatoetoe seat and represented it from 1978 to 1987, when he retired. During the Fourth Labour Government he was appointed as a Parliamentary Under-Secretary to the Minister of Labour, Minister of Employment and Minister of Immigration by David Lange. He was replaced in the Papatoetoe electorate by Ross Robertson.

=== Later life and death ===
In December 1987, shortly after leaving parliament, Isbey was appointed to the board of the Accident Compensation Corporation (ACC). In the 1988 New Year Honours, Isbey was appointed a Companion of the Queen's Service Order for public services. In 1990, he was awarded the New Zealand 1990 Commemoration Medal.

Isbey died in Auckland on 25 July 1995 aged 77.

== Personal life ==
On 9 June 1953, he married Annette Constance Graham, the daughter of Walter (Mick) Graham. They had two sons and one daughter. He met Annette (who was an artist) while attending an art exhibition in Auckland. His pastimes included theatre, boats, reading, art, watching football, and boxing. In 1978, he lived in Herne Bay, Auckland.

Isbey was Jewish.

His brother Dave Isbey (1915–1994) was likewise a unionist and Labour politician. He crewed a whaling ship to Antarctica in 1939 before joining Merchant Navy (like his brother) during World War II. After the war he came to New Zealand and got job with the Auckland Harbour Board. He was president of the Auckland Labour Representation Committee and stood twice for the Auckland City Council in 1959 and 1962, but was unsuccessful.

== Notes ==
New Zealand Parliament
Preceded by Ritchie Macdonald	Member of Parliament for Grey Lynn; 1969–1978	Constituency abolished
New constituency	Member of Parliament for Papatoetoe; 1978–1987	Succeeded by Ross Robertson
Party political offices
Preceded by Charles Bennett	Vice-President of the New Zealand Labour Party; 1973–1974	Succeeded by Gerald O'Brien
