= Prebble =

Prebble as a surname may refer to the following:

- Antonia Prebble, New Zealand actress
- John Prebble, English/Canadian journalist
- Lee Prebble, New Zealand record producer
- Lucy Prebble, British writer
- Mark Prebble, New Zealand public service commissioner
- Michael Prebble, leader of Scott Base for whom Prebble Glacier is named.
- Peter Prebble, Canadian politician
- Richard Prebble, New Zealand politician
- Sam Prebble, New Zealand game developer
- Simon Prebble, English actor and narrator
- Stuart Prebble, English broadcasting executive and author
- Tom Prebble, New Zealand educationalist and university administrator
- W.M. Prebble, geologist after whom the Antarctic features Prebble Formation and Prebble Icefalls are named

== See also ==
- Preble (disambiguation)
