= Stan Rodger =

New Zealand politician (1940–2022)

The Honourable Stan Rodger CMG JP
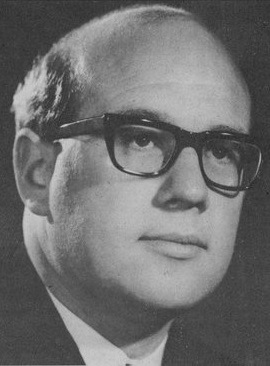
- Rodger in 1970

3rd Minister for State Owned Enterprises
- In office 8 November 1988 – 9 February 1990
- Prime Minister: David Lange; Geoffrey Palmer
- Preceded by: David Lange
- Succeeded by: Richard Prebble

7th Minister of State Services
- In office 26 July 1984 – 9 February 1990
- Prime Minister: David Lange; Geoffrey Palmer
- Preceded by: David Thomson
- Succeeded by: Clive Matthewson

28th Minister of Labour
- In office 26 July 1984 – 8 August 1989
- Prime Minister: David Lange
- Preceded by: Jim Bolger
- Succeeded by: Helen Clark

Member of the New Zealand Parliament for Dunedin North
- In office 25 November 1978 – 27 October 1990
- Preceded by: Richard Walls
- Succeeded by: Pete Hodgson

Personal details
- Born: 13 February 1940 Dunedin, New Zealand
- Died: 29 May 2022 (aged 82) Dunedin, New Zealand
- Party: Labour
- Spouse: Anne Patricia O'Connor (m. 1968)
- Children: 2
- Profession: Public servant

Stanley Joseph Rodger CMG JP (13 February 1940 – 29 May 2022) was a New Zealand politician of the Labour Party. He was president of the Public Service Association between 1970 and 1973 and Member of Parliament for Dunedin North from 1978 to 1990.

== Biography ==
=== Early life and career ===
Rodger was born in Dunedin on 13 February 1940, the son of Edith Rodger (née Lloyd) and James Stanley Rodger. He was educated at Kaikorai Primary School and King Edward Technical College. In 1968, he married Anne Patricia O'Connor and the couple went on to have two children, including Craig Rodger who became the Beverly Professor of Physics at the University of Otago.

In 1957, Rodger began his career in the public service in Dunedin working at the Ministry of Works and Development, later moving to Wellington to take up another position at the Ministry. He remained at the Ministry of Works and Development until 1974 when he transferred to the newly created Housing Corporation.

He became involved with the Public Service Association (PSA) and became vice-president from 1967 to 1970. From 1970 to 1973, he was president of the PSA. Between 1970 and 1974 he was the chairman of the Combined State Unions and from 1976 to 1978 he was the assistant secretary of the PSA.

=== Political career ===
New Zealand Parliament
Years	Term	Electorate	Party
1978–1981	39th	Dunedin North	Labour
1981–1984	40th	Dunedin North	Labour
1984–1987	41st	Dunedin North	Labour
1987–1990	42nd	Dunedin North	Labour

In 1963 he put himself forward to replace Phil Connolly the retiring MP for Dunedin Central, but lost out to Brian MacDonell. Aged only 22 at the time Rodger was informed by Arnold Nordmeyer that his age was against him. However, Connolly subsequently gave Rodger encouragement to pursue politics.

Rodger stood unsuccessfully for the Labour Party in the 1963 election for Waitaki and in the 1966 election for Otago. In 1965, 1968 and 1971, he stood as a Labour candidate for the Wellington Hospital Board without success. In 1968 he also stood for a seat on the Wellington City Council, but was likewise unsuccessful. In 1973, he stood for vice-president of the Labour Party and was seen as the front-runner for the position. However, he finished only third behind the winner, Eddie Isbey, and Jonathan Hunt.

Rodger represented the electorate of Dunedin North in Parliament from 1978 to 1990, when he retired and was replaced by Pete Hodgson. From 1980 to 1984 he was Labour's junior whip. From 1982 to 1984 he was Shadow Postmaster-General.

He was appointed Minister of Labour and State Services by Prime Minister David Lange in the Fourth Labour Government. With his union background he happily conceded a media tag that as Minister of Labour he was "a poacher turned gamekeeper" also stating that his union background would be advantageous to all parties in industrial disputes. His immediate concern was the wage freeze implemented by the preceding National government. He negotiated with unions to agree to an initial three-month extension of the wage freeze until a solution to exit the freeze could be decided. He represented the government at the annual conferences of the International Labour Organization (ILO) as well as the Asian Region Conference of the ILO in Jakarta in 1985.

Rodger's political opponents gave him the tag of "Side-line Stan". As Minister of State Services, Rodger was responsible for overseeing the introduction and implementation of the controversial State Sector Act 1988 that reshaped and partially privatised the public service in New Zealand. The reform was deeply unpopular, so much so that the PSA stripped Rodger of his life membership (however they restored it in 2004). He was never enthusiastic about the public service reforms, but publicly went along with them nevertheless. Roderick Deane, the then Chairman of the State Services Commission, said of Rodger's role in the reforms: "The quiet, silent type who held it all together by not intervening when he must have been sorely tempted to do so was Stan Rodger".

The Business Round Table was critical of Rodger for holding up labour market reforms, though fellow ministers thought this was unfair due to his high workload (which also included the immigration portfolio from 1987). After Richard Prebble was sacked by Lange, Rodger's workload increased further when he was given Prebble's former post of Minister for State Owned Enterprises. The Rural Bank, National Shipping Line and Telecom were all privatised by Rodger.

On 11 December 1989, Rodger publicly announced, to much surprise, he would retire from parliament at the 1990 election. He had planned to do so far in advance, confidentially telling Lange on 21 August 1988 of his retirement intentions as well as sending a sealed envelope to Keith Eunson, the editor of the Otago Daily Times with instruction not to open until 11 December 1989. When Lange's replacement as Prime Minister Geoffrey Palmer held a complete re-election of cabinet in early 1990 all members of the cabinet not contesting the next election were discouraged from standing. Despite this, Rodger did put his name on the ballot, the only retiring minister to do so. He missed out on election, but took the defeat benignly. After leaving the cabinet he was selected to represent the New Zealand government at the Commonwealth Parliamentary Association held in Zimbabwe in September 1990.

In the 1991 New Year Honours, Rodger was appointed a Companion of the Order of St Michael and St George, for public services.

=== Post-parliamentary career ===
In December 1990, after exiting parliament, Rodger took up a position at the University of Otago as the assistant registrar and secretary of the School of Dentistry. He was later appointed director of the Southern Regional Health Authority (RHA) and in 1997 was appointed a member of a board of review into RHAs. He was a vocal critic of Sukhi Turner's performance as mayor of Dunedin and endorsed former Labour MP Clive Matthewson (and his successor as Minister of State Services) at the 1998 mayoral election.

In 2000, Rodger was appointed chair of the review team tasked with conducting a ministerial review of the Education Review Office. In 2004, he was appointed deputy chairman of Transpower New Zealand. In 2006, he was appointed to the Electricity Commission, and he stepped down from his chairmanship role at Transpower.

In the 2019 New Year Honours, Rodger's wife, Anne Rodger, was appointed a Member of the New Zealand Order of Merit, for services to women.

Rodger died in Dunedin on 29 May 2022, aged 82. His wife, Anne Rodger, died on 30 November 2023.

== Notes ==
Political offices
Preceded by David Lange	Minister for State Owned Enterprises; 1988–1990	Succeeded by Richard Prebble
Preceded by Kerry Burke	Minister of Immigration; 1987–1989	Succeeded by Roger Douglas
Preceded by David Thomson	Minister of State Services; 1984–1990	Succeeded by Clive Matthewson
Preceded by Jim Bolger	Minister of Labour; 1984–1989	Succeeded by Helen Clark
New Zealand Parliament
Preceded by Richard Walls	Member of Parliament for Dunedin North; 1978–1990	Succeeded by Pete Hodgson
Trade union offices
Preceded by Ray Hannan	President of the Public Service Association; 1970–1973	Succeeded by Jack Batt
