= Māori loan affair =

Political controversy in New Zealand

The Māori loan affair (or Hawaiian loans affair) of 1986 and 1987 in New Zealand was an unauthorised attempt by the Department of Māori Affairs (today called Te Puni Kōkiri) to raise money overseas for Māori development. The affair was first raised in Parliament on 16 December 1986 with a question from opposition National MP Winston Peters about loan negotiations; the revelations dumbfounded ministers; and the house adjourned on 18 December. Peters was reluctant to share all his information with the State Services Commission chairman Roderick Deane or Peters' National Party leader Jim Bolger, and Bolger then downplayed the affair. Peters was getting information from an informant in Koro Wētere's office and from Rotorua businessman Rocky Cribb. Peters was first advised of the affair by Edwin Perry an associate of Cribb and like Cribb a National Party member. The affair helped Peters' promotion to the frontbench after the 1987 election.

Members of the Fourth Labour Government were divided on the action to be taken, with Prime Minister David Lange, Lange's staff, and his deputy Geoffrey Palmer wanting the resignation of Wētere as Minister of Māori Affairs and from his seat in Parliament (Wētere would have had to face a by-election in an election year), though the cabinet decided against this on 9 February. Hence as Bassett later wrote, "Several ministers would agree in later years, however that it was about the time of the Māori loans affair that cabinet solidarity began to fall apart." Finance Minister Roger Douglas later recounted that the "hostilities" within the cabinet began with the Māori loans affair.

At the beginning of 1987 a Television New Zealand report from Hawaii claimed a link with the CIA and suggested an American attempt to destabilise the Labour government because of its anti-nuclear policy, although Palmer thought the matter involved incompetence in the department.

== The loan ==
The loan, supposedly of NZ$600 million of Middle Eastern petrodollars (including a "finder's fee" of NZ$20 million), was to be used to set up a Māori Resource Development Corporation, which would use Māori labour to prefabricate houses for export. The Secretary of Māori Affairs, Tamati Reedy, was negotiating as Māori Trustee, but had been counselled against the proposed loan by Graham Scott of Treasury in November. Senior departmental officials had attended a series of meetings in Hawaii, and been introduced to the participants by Rocky Cribb, a businessman from Rotorua.

Roderick Deane, the Chairman of the State Services Commission, was asked to investigate, and when he uncovered evidence of departmental incompetence, produced a fuller report on Christmas Eve. Sometimes working through the night, he found that "some ministers" had known about the negotiations but failed to stop it, and Reedy's signing of a document headed "Unconditional and Irrevocable Fee Agreement" was unauthorised and contrary to Treasury advice.

The terms of 4% interest over 25 years were not believable; the money according to a telex from the embassy in Washington was probably laundered, fraudulent or non-existent; and the supposed source of the loan, one Achmed Omar of the Kuwaiti royal family, did not exist. The loan was for US$300 million, and papers released suggested that the proposal would use Māori land as collateral, and that as well as the 3.5% fee to Gicondi there would also be a 2.5% fee for Raepelle, totalling 6%. Trevor de Cleene suggested that the money source might be Ferdinand Marcos, who was then living in Hawaii.

The first interest payment would have been $24 million; David Lange, who was in his element, told a hui, "You tell me the kids are out in the streets .... the next minute you tell me you can finance $24 million". Activist Titewhai Harawira told Lange that "the Māori people needed far more than $600 million, and the government should let them borrow it".

== The principals ==
The principal was Max Raepple a "self-styled German financier" with a friend Michael Gisondi. Raepple had arrived in New Zealand in January, and on 21 January Lange took a swipe at "some of the Māori whingers and activists (with) something of a cargo cult mentality which is an utter betrayal of what Māori enterprise is about" and "self-appointed activists in international finance ranging from undischarged bankrupts to lapsed priests and all sorts of people who accept the bona fides of (Raepelle) who will not allow his credentials to even be read by a newspaper". Bassett commented that "the likes of Eva Rickard, Sonny Waru, Ken Mair and Eru Potaka Dewes who were strutting about, knew little about business".

Journalists investigated (Rocky) Cribb, the supposed Hawaiian bankers, the shadowy Europeans Max Raepple and Michael Gisondi, and their Māori connections. Deane discovered through his international bank contacts that "Both the Europeans, it transpired, were specialists in phoney money schemes, and at Cabinet on 20 January 1987, Lange entertained ministers with lurid accounts of Gisondi's activities". Lange wrote that the story "had the lot: con artists, Hawaiian middlemen and shady Middle Eastern financiers".

Gerald Hensley, the head of the Prime Minister's Department, wrote that a small group from the Reserve Bank, Police, Ministry of Foreign Affairs and intelligence agencies helped by the FBI and Washington's currency protection office investigated the people involved and uncovered "a convoluted rat-run of money-launderers, criminals, and snake-oil salesman who had descended on the Pacific and our own Māori Affairs Department in the wake of the petrodollar boom". They were variants of the "brokered loan confidence game". The Arab connection was said to be a former Kuwaiti finance minister, plus other rogues like a retired Air Force general who was a "playboy and drunk", someone hinting of links to the CIA, a fashionable interior decorator and other "convicted fraudsters, bankrupts and promoters of collapsed companies".

Raepple "was regarded by overseas currency and fraud protection services with a marked distaste increased by the fact that in a series of dubious operations no one had been able to fasten a criminal conviction on him". He operated in the Pacific; in July 1986 in the Cooks as a "Californian philanthropist with an interest in low-cost housing", then in Vanuatu offering to raise funds from Middle East sources for a new airport, then a fiasco in Tonga over an unbuilt "Crown Prince Hotel", and talk of setting up an “International Bank of the South Pacific”. Lange suggested in Parliament that Raepple was the same man as one Werner Rohrich, who did have a police record.

== The minister ==
Koro Wētere the Minister of Māori Affairs "appeared to give the go-ahead" to the Secretary (Reedy) as Māori Trustee to negotiate with an "American (sic) financier"; and although Wētere claimed that the loan had been cleared with the Minister of Finance Roger Douglas, Douglas had no recollection of any agreement. Wētere "denied all knowledge of the plan" to Palmer according to Lange and to Pope, but Geoffrey Palmer wrote that the Minister "did not consent to the raising of any loan" and "knocked the idea on the head when he learned the full import of what was going on". There were suggestions that Wētere had known of the proposal as long ago as 21 October 1986, and that a trip he was to make to Hawaii in December was to discuss the proposal as well as to attend the new Hawaiian Governor's inauguration.

Deane had found evidence of "considerable chaos" in the department, and discussed with Lange whether to remove Reedy and restructure the department; however, as this would involve firing Wētere as well, Lange baulked. Reedy and his deputy, Neville Baker were suspended for a time, but restructuring of the Māori Affairs Department was put on hold. In January when a large group claiming that Māori were not being treated fairly by Deane and demanded to see the Minister (Wētere), Deane, at the urging of his deputy Don Hunn, arranged a full day of discussion with food and cups of tea at the State Services Commission building. Eventually feelings were calmer and relations more friendly.

Lange flew to Napier and Wanganui on the weekend of 7 & 8 February to consult Māori leaders; supposedly on a secret flight, he was greeted at Wanganui Airport by a guard of honour from territorials exercising there. On his trip he was given the message from Māori leaders outside parliament that what had happened was deplorable but Wetere should be supported, so he "started 1987 by inventing defences for the minister". Lange publicly declared that the minister had acted "unwisely" (in writing a note of support for Cribb). At a meeting of Māori leaders Lange had convened at Palmer's request, something close to a fist fight broke out in front of him; Palmer handed him a note which said "I am not of this planet" and left the room.

Lange told Wētere on his return that the Māori leaders he had consulted favoured his resignation and a by-election, and Wētere offered to resign. Lange's own account says that Wetere's future was in the balance, but does not mention that he wanted Wētere to resign as minister (to be replaced by Peter Tapsell) and also to resign his seat and fight a by-election. Prebble and Douglas got wind of this strategy on the evening of 8 February. So Cabinet on 9 February held a lengthy discussion and the resignation proposal was rejected, with only four ministers in favour (Lange and Palmer plus Russell Marshall and Margaret Shields). Douglas told Wētere at the Cabinet meeting that "I don’t want to see you on television every night for the next four weeks of a by-election campaign talking about Māori loans that weren’t raised when there are ever so many more important matters before us in election year". Prebble said "Better to talk about the $7 billion that was borrowed (by Muldoon for Think Big) than about the $600 million that wasn't". After the cabinet meeting Lange (at the urging of his staff) defended Wētere at a press conference, saying " ... it was odd that he should be pilloried over loans that weren't raised, when the media seemed not interested in the $7 billion that had been raised and squandered by National".

== The department ==
The Ministry of Māori Affairs was headed by the Secretary of Māori Affairs Tamati Reedy and his deputy Neville Baker. Reedy was negotiating as Māori Trustee, but had been counselled against the proposed loan by Graham Scott of Treasury in November. Senior departmental officials had attended a series of meetings in Hawaii. The local middleman was a businessman Rocky Cribb from Rotorua, who Wētere had given a letter of support to, and who went bankrupt. Cribb was the principal informant for Winston Peters. There were proposals to transfer Tamati Reedy to the new Māori Language Commission, but Reedy regarded it as a promotion warranting higher pay.

Palmer stated that the department was incompetent and "spent much of its time and energy in administering financial assistance programmes of various sorts". The saga ended before anything happened, but negative media coverage intensified. Jim Callaghan, the recently retired Secretary for Justice was brought in to bring some order to the department. Palmer noted that it was no longer possible for Cabinet's decisions safely to be communicated to Māori Affairs because the minutes went straight to the press.

Lange and Douglas had seen the need for a competently run Māori business development arm, and also for a reorganisation of the "shambles" in the Māori Affairs Department. Departmental reorganisation was postponed, but on 10 February 1987, the government resolved in principle to establish a Māori Development Corporation, and this was done in the 1987 budget. Later Bassett said that ministers adopted a double standards of expectation where Māori were concerned, and standards of accountability for the expenditure public money by many Māori groups remained foreign. Problems included MANA Enterprise established by the department in 1985 which was "mired in accusations of mismanagement".

== See also ==
- Loans affair in Australia, 1975
- List of political scandals in New Zealand
