= Prebble v Television New Zealand Ltd =

Case about parliamentary privilege in New Zealand

- Court: Privy Council
- Full case name: Richard William Prebble v Television New Zealand Limited
- Decided: 27 June 1994
- Citations: [1994] NZPC 4; [1994] UKPC 4; [1995] 1 AC 321; [1994] 3 NZLR 1; [1994] 3 WLR 970; [1994] 3 All ER 407

Court membership
- Judges sitting: Lord Keith of Kinkel, Lord Goff of Chieveley, Lord Browne-Wilkinson, Lord Mustill, Lord Nolan

Prebble v Television New Zealand Ltd is a decision of the Judicial Committee of the Privy Council, on appeal from the Court of Appeal of New Zealand, regarding claims in defamation and the defence of parliamentary privilege.

== Background ==
TVNZ's news programme Frontline broadcast an episode which criticised the Fourth Labour Government of New Zealand and referred to the sale of state-owned assets, including Air New Zealand, while Richard Prebble was the Minister of State-Owned Enterprises.

Prebble sued TVNZ for defamation, arguing that the programme accused him of conspiring to sell state assets to business leaders on unduly favourable terms in order to obtain donations to the New Zealand Labour Party. TVNZ denied that the programme carried any of the defamatory meanings alleged by Prebble and alternatively, alleged that some of the defamatory meanings were true.

Most of the defence relied on statements and actions which did not take place in Parliament. However, it included allegations that Prebble and other ministers misled the New Zealand House of Representatives by falsely suggesting that the government did not intend to sell off state assets. TVNZ also alleged that the conspiracy to sell state assets was implemented by passing legislation. Prebble applied to strike out these parts of the defence, which were said to infringe the parliamentary privilege established by article 9 of the Bill of Rights 1688.

== Decision ==
At first instance in the High Court of New Zealand, Smellie J allowed Prebble's application and struck out parts of TVNZ's defence. TVNZ appealed to the Court of Appeal. The Court of Appeal upheld Smellie J's decision, but raised the question of whether it was just to allow Prebble to continue with his action in view of TVNZ's inability to deploy all relevant evidence in support of the plea of justification. The Court of Appeal ordered a stay of Prebble's action unless and until privilege was waived by the House of Representatives. The Privileges Committee of the House held that the House had no power to waive the privileges protected by article 9.

Prebble appealed to the Privy Council against the stay order, and TVNZ sought to challenge the decisions of Smellie J and the Court of Appeal on the question of privilege. TVNZ first argued that privilege only applies in proceedings which seek to assert legal consequences against the maker of the statement. In the alternative, TVNZ argued that where a member of parliament brings proceedings for libel, parliamentary privilege should not prevent a defendant from justifying the libel by challenging the plaintiff's statements in Parliament.

=== Parliamentary privilege ===
TVNZ's first argument was based on the decision of the Supreme Court of New South Wales in R v Murphy. During the trial of Lionel Murphy, the Supreme Court allowed a witness's previous evidence to a parliamentary committee to be put to the witness in cross-examination, even though article 9 provided that proceedings in Parliament "ought not to be impeached or questioned in any court." The Parliamentary Privileges Act 1987 (Cth) was then enacted, making clear that R v Murphy did not represent the law of Australia. The Privy Council accepted that the Act reflected the common law to be applied in the United Kingdom and elsewhere in the Commonwealth, and refused to apply R v Murphy.

TVNZ's second argument relied on Wright v Lewis, a decision of the Supreme Court of South Australia. Peter Lewis, a member of the South Australian House of Assembly, sued the publisher of The Advertiser for publishing a letter to the editor which accused Lewis of abusing parliamentary privilege. The Supreme Court held that privilege did not extend to legal proceedings initiated by the maker of a privileged statement. The Privy Council also declined to apply Wright, holding that an individual member of Parliament's decision to sue could not override the collective privilege of the House to judge whether a member had misled it or acted improperly.

The Privy Council concluded that "parties to litigation, by whomsoever commenced, cannot bring into question anything said or done in the House by suggesting (whether by direct evidence, cross-examination, inference or submission) that the actions or words were inspired by improper motives or were untrue or misleading." However, the court accepted that Hansard could be used to prove what was said in Parliament as a matter of history. It was a matter for the trial judge to ensure that the proof of historical facts is not used to suggest that words were improperly spoken or legislation improperly passed.

=== Stay of proceedings ===
The Privy Council held that there may be cases in which the exclusion of material on the grounds of parliamentary privilege makes it impossible fairly to determine the issue between the parties, but a stay should only be granted in the most extreme circumstances. The court gave Wright as an example of such a case, where the whole subject matter relates to conduct in Parliament. However, TVNZ's reliance on statements made in Parliament was "comparatively marginal." The Privy Council allowed the appeal against the stay order granted by the Court of Appeal, finding that "the plaintiff is entitled to have his case heard – and the defendant is able to put forward the overwhelming majority of the matters upon which it relies in justification of the alleged libel."

== See also ==
- Bill of Rights 1688
- Parliamentary privilege
- Defamation
