= Simon Murdoch =

New Zealand diplomat and public servant

Simon Murdoch CNZM
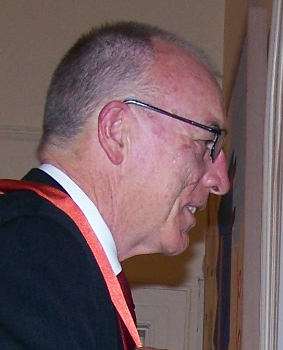
- Murdoch in 2009

Secretary of Foreign Affairs and Trade
- In office 2002–2009
- Preceded by: Neil Walter
- Succeeded by: John Allen

High Commissioner to Australia
- In office 1999–2002
- Preceded by: Graham Fortune
- Succeeded by: Kate Lackey

Chief Executive of the Department of Prime Minister and Cabinet
- In office 1991–1998
- Prime Minister: Jim Bolger, Jenny Shipley
- Succeeded by: Mark Prebble

Personal details
- Born: Simon Peter Wallace Murdoch; 1948 (age 77–78)

Simon Peter Wallace Murdoch CNZM (born 1948) is a New Zealand diplomat and public servant. He was New Zealand's Secretary of Foreign Affairs and Trade and was previously New Zealand High Commissioner to Canberra, and Chief Executive of the Department of Prime Minister and Cabinet.

== Early life and education ==
Murdoch attended University of Canterbury, where he gained a first class master's degree with honours in history.

== Ministry of Foreign Affairs ==
Murdoch joined the Ministry of Foreign Affairs in 1972. He had an early posting to Canberra, before joining the Department of the Prime Minister and Cabinet in 1980 as foreign affairs adviser to Prime Minister Rob Muldoon.

In 1983, Murdoch was assistant head of the Asian division in the Ministry of Foreign Affairs. Later that year, he was posted to Washington, D.C., as political counsellor, and the New Zealand intelligence liaison officer to the United States.

In 1987, Murdoch returned to New Zealand and became head of the Australia Division in the Ministry of Foreign Affairs.

In 1989, Murdoch was seconded to the Department of Prime Minister and Cabinet to be head of the Policy Advisory Group. In 1991, State Services Commissioner Don Hunn appointed Murdoch to the post of Secretary of the Department of Prime Minister and Cabinet.

Murdoch was head of the department of Prime Minister and Cabinet under Prime Ministers Jim Bolger and Jenny Shipley. He left the post in 1998, to become visiting professor of Public Policy and Management at Victoria University of Wellington for a year.

In 1999, Murdoch was appointed New Zealand High Commissioner to Australia.

In 2002, Murdoch succeeded Neil Walter as New Zealand's Secretary of Foreign Affairs. He retired from that position in 2009. In the 2009 Queen's Birthday Honours, Murdoch was appointed a Companion of the New Zealand Order of Merit, for public services, lately as Secretary of Foreign Affairs.

== GCSB ==
In 2010 he conducted a review of New Zealand intelligence agencies, and for two periods before and after the appointment of Lt Gen Sir Jerry Mateparae, he was acting chief executive and director of the GCSB. During his second stint in the position he presided over the illegal surveillance of Kim Dotcom, but left weeks before the raid was carried out on 20 January 2013.
