= Nancy McShane =

Equal pay campaigner

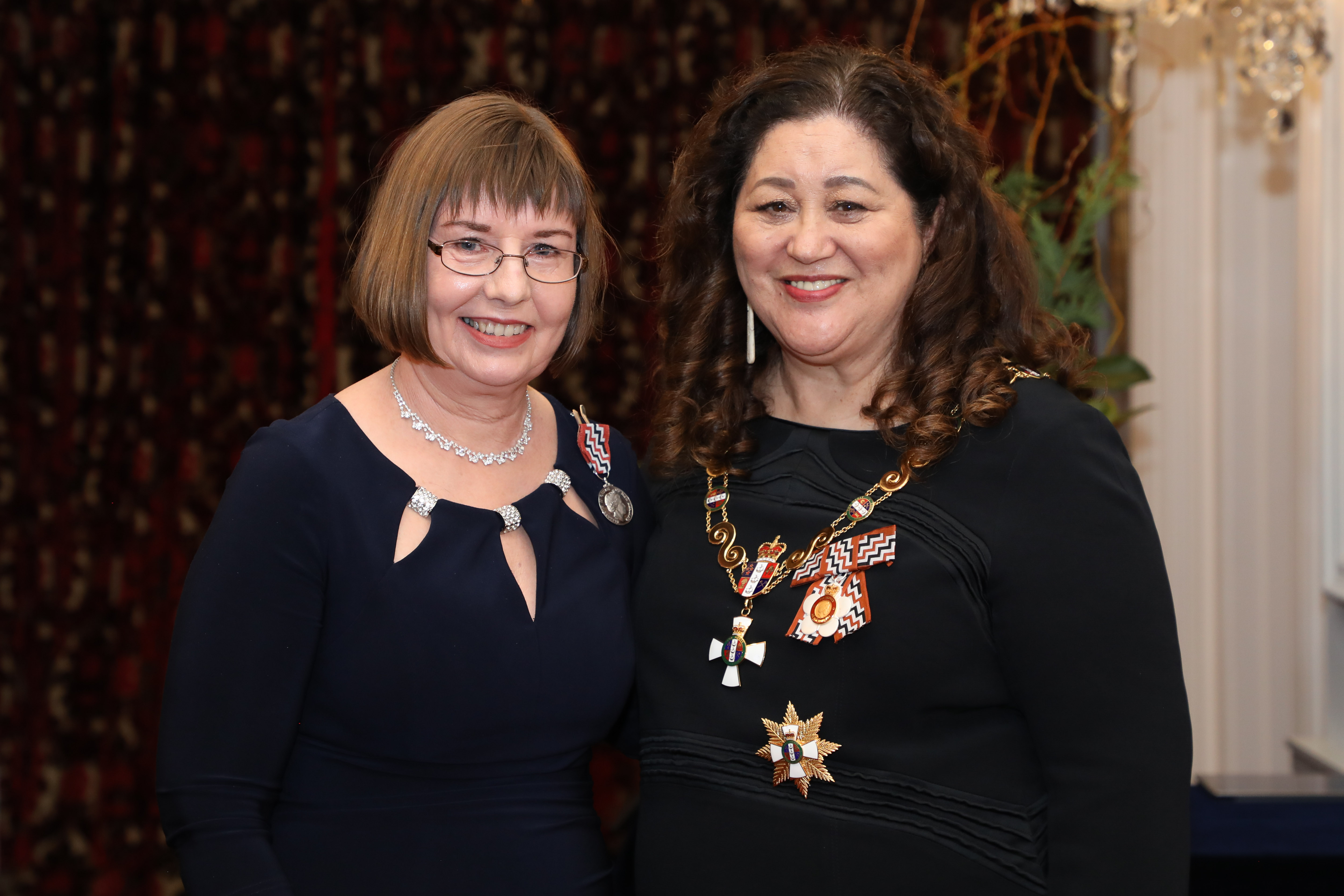
McShane's Queen's Service Medal presentation

Nancy McShane QSM is an equal pay campaigner from New Zealand. In 2023, she received a Queen's Service Medal for services to women and equal pay.

== Biography ==
McShane started working at the Canterbury District Health Board as a mental health sector administrator in 2008. She became a Public Service Association delegate and began advocating for equal pay for District Health Board administration staff. In 2018, she became the Women's Network representatiave on the Public Service Association District Health Board Administrators' Equal Pay negotiating team. The claim was settled in June 2022.
