= Brenda Pilott =

New Zealand public servant

Brenda Pilott ONZM
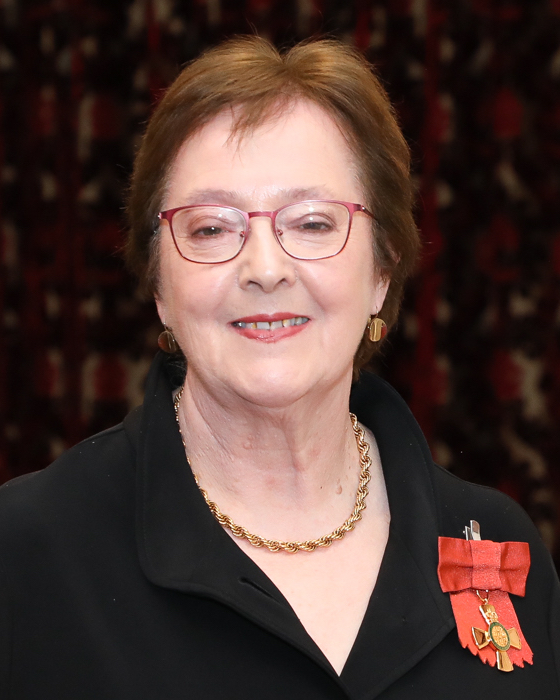
- Born: London
- Education: University of Essex, University College London
- Awards: Officer of the New Zealand Order of Merit

Brenda Pilott ONZM is a former New Zealand public servant, trade union leader and social services activist who has advocated for greater recognition of the issue of domestic violence, fair pay, and more resources for public services. In 2021 Pilott was appointed an Officer of the New Zealand Order of Merit for services to social and public service sectors.

== Early life and education ==
Pilott was born in London. She has a Bachelor of Arts with Honours from Essex University and a Diploma in Library and Information Services from University College London.

== Career in New Zealand ==
Pilott worked in the domestic violence sector, and was the National Coordinator of the National Collective of Independent Women’s Refuges. This led on to a number of other roles in the public service and community and social services. She was the National Secretary of the Public Service Association for ten years, from 2004. From 2016 to 2022 she was National Manager of Social Service Providers Aotearoa, and Chair of ComVoices, a social service agency collective. She has worked on various pay equity claims since 2019. Pilott served on the council of Victoria University of Wellington from 2008 to 2012, having been appointed by the University Council after consultation with NZCTU. Pilott was on the board of the United Fire Brigades’ Association, retiring from her position in 2021. During her time on the board, the UFBA and the Forest and Rural Fire Association NZ merged, and Pilott advocated successfully for the retention of the Newlands Volunteer Fire Brigade.

Pilott has advocated for pay equity for women and social services sector workers, improved resourcing for the public services, and increased recognition of domestic violence as an issue. She has also advocated for no private funding of roads, and for better data privacy for users of social services.

== Personal life ==
Pilott is married with two adult sons, lives in Wellington and is the Chair of the Hutt Valley Women's Refuge board, and a Trustee for Age Concern. She thinks Wellington's weather is its best feature, finding the wind "refreshing and invigorating".

== Honours and awards ==
In the 2021 New Year Honours Pilott was appointed an Officer of the New Zealand Order of Merit for services to social and public service sectors.
