= Fintan Patrick Walsh =

New Zealand seaman, trade unionist, and farmer

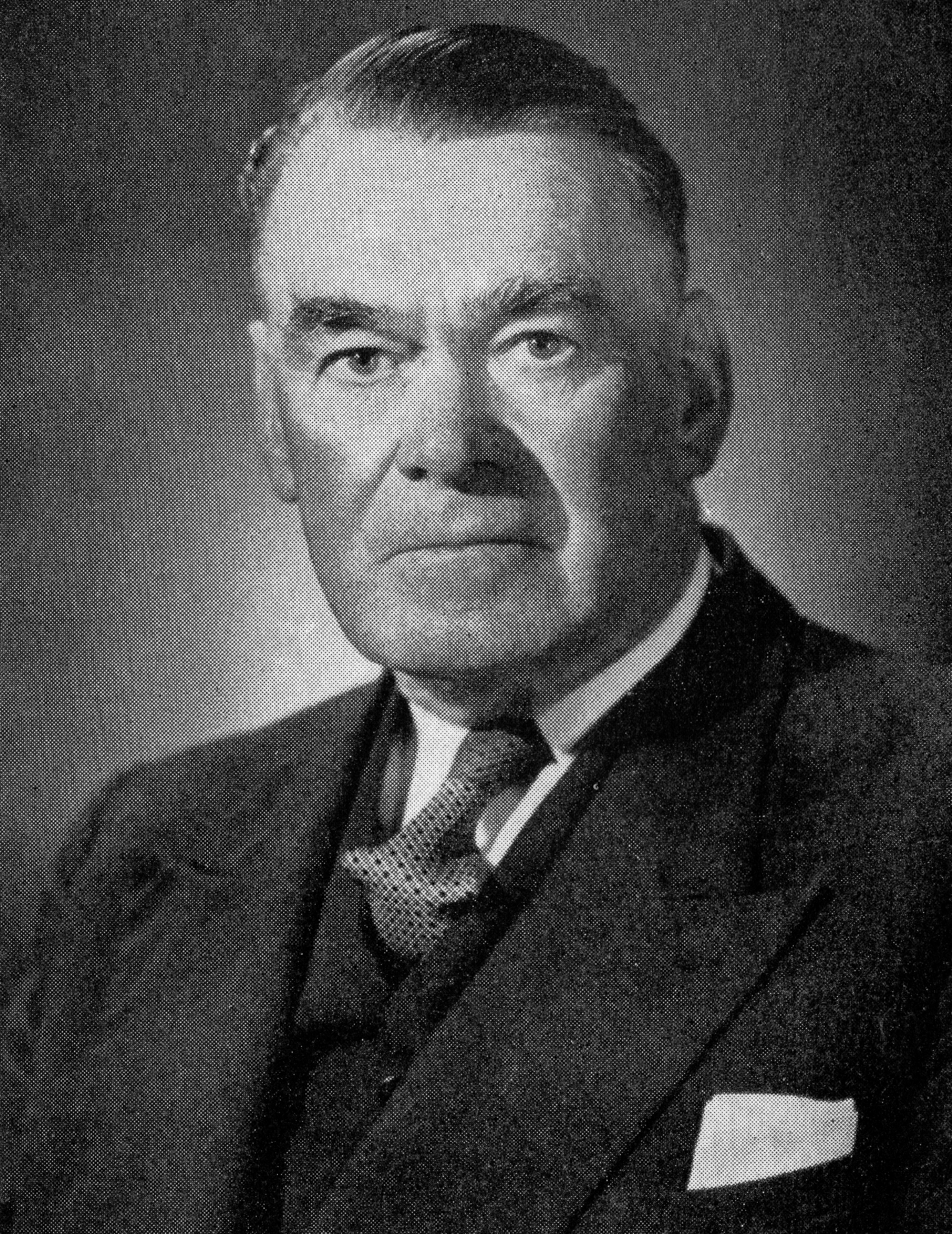
- Walsh, c. 1950s

3rd President of the Federation of Labour
- In office 17 October 1952 – 16 May 1963
- Vice President: Bill Fox (1952–59); Tom Skinner (1959–63)
- Preceded by: Alec Croskery
- Succeeded by: Tom Skinner

Personal details
- Born: Patrick Tuohy; 13 August 1894 Pātūtahi, New Zealand
- Died: 16 May 1963 (aged 68) Wellington, New Zealand
- Party: Labour
- Other political affiliations: Communist (1920–24)
- Children: 1
- Occupation: Seaman

Fintan Patrick Walsh (13 August 1894 – 16 May 1963) was a notable New Zealand seaman, trade unionist and farmer. He was born in Pātūtahi, Poverty Bay, on the East Coast of New Zealand in 1894, and died in Wellington in 1963.

== Biography ==
Fintan Patrick Walsh was born Patrick Tuohy at Pātūtahi, Poverty Bay, on 13 August 1894, one of eleven children of farming parents Andrew Tuohy and his wife, Hannah O'Sullivan, both born in Ireland. He was raised a Catholic but reportedly discarded his faith when he became an adult.

He was a founding member of the Communist Party of New Zealand. Walsh was president of the New Zealand Federation of Labour between 1953 and 1963.

In 1953, Walsh was awarded the Queen Elizabeth II Coronation Medal.

He died in Wellington on 16 May 1963. Though he never married he was survived by a daughter.

== See also ==
- Hedwig Ross, co-founder of the Communist Party of New Zealand

Trade union offices
Preceded by Alec Croskery	President of the Federation of Labour; 1952–1963	Succeeded by Tom Skinner
