= Alec Croskery =

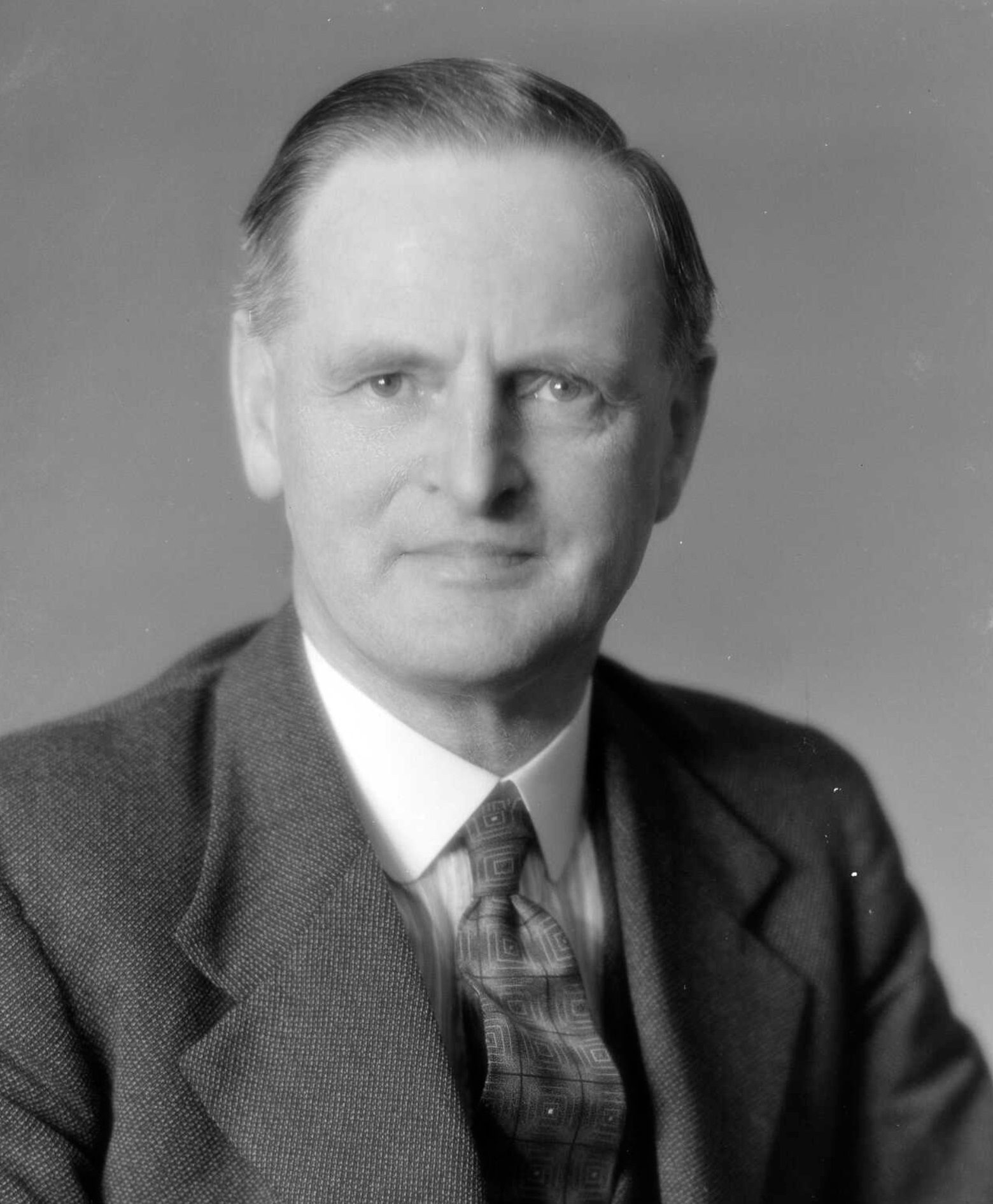

2nd President of the Federation of Labour
- In office 13 June 1946 – 18 August 1952
- Vice President: Fintan Patrick Walsh
- Preceded by: Angus McLagan
- Succeeded by: Fintan Patrick Walsh

Personal details
- Born: 19 December 1878 Swansea, Wales
- Died: 18 August 1952 (aged 73) Wellington, New Zealand
- Party: Labour
- Spouse: Emily Clark
- Children: 11
- Occupation: Draper

Alexander Wellington Croskery (19 December 1878 – 18 August 1952) was a New Zealand draper, political activist and trade unionist

== Biography ==
=== Early life and death ===
Croskery was born in 1878 in Swansea, Glamorganshire, Wales, to Alexander Brown Croskery, (1838–1897), an Irish accountant and provision merchant from Downpatrick, County Down, Ireland, and Mary Ann Mortimer Thomson, (1850–1925), from Ballynahinch, County Down, Ireland. He had a brother, William Hugh Croskery. Croskery arrived in New Zealand with his parents in 1880. He attended Queen's College in Auckland, before working on a farm in Taranaki from 1894 to 1895. He then moved to Wellington, and in 1896 began work as a draper's assistant at James Smith and Sons. He married Emily Clark on 17 December 1902; they were to have ten daughters and three sons. The family lived in Newtown, where between 1902 and 1911 Croskery ran his own drapery and tailoring business in Riddiford Street, then about 1917 moved to Lyall Bay.

=== Career ===
Croskery helped to found the Wellington Retail Soft-goods Employees' Union in February, 1912, and served as its secretary. He also served as Secretary of the Wellington Butchers' Union, Secretary of the NZ Shop Assistants' Federation, and the Wellington Plumbers' and Gasfitters' Union, from their foundation until his death in 1952. Croskery worked hard to increase the union's membership, particularly in provincial areas outside Wellington, and supported the incorporation of all shop employees into one union. A capable administrator and advocate, he was a model arbitrationist union secretary. He had a meticulous approach to clerical and financial matters and invested union funds shrewdly.

From 1913, Croskery was closely involved with the Wellington Trades and Labour Council and its successor, the Wellington Trades Council, serving as an executive member from 1936 and as vice president from 1939 to 1945. He was also active in the political wing of the labour movement. He stood unsuccessfully for the Wellington City Council on several occasions, and contested the Wellington Suburbs electorate for the New Zealand Labour Party in the 1919 and 1922 general elections. He was a member of the Labour Party's national executive in 1937–38 and 1939–40, but he always put the interests of his union's members first.

In the 1930s, Croskery emerged as a significant figure in the national labour movement. In 1936 he became secretary of the New Zealand Alliance of Labour, and the following year he played an important role in unifying the various factions to form the New Zealand Federation of Labour (FOL). He was a member of the Wellington Hospital Board from 1935 to 1941. He served as a workers' representative on the Court of Arbitration from 1937 to 1938. He later served on the Industrial Emergency Council and the Workers' Compensation Board. He became a member of the FOL's executive in 1942 and its vice president in 1943.

In 1945, he attended the World Trade Union Conference in London alongside many renowned trade unionists. In 1946, Croskery was elected President of the Federation of Labour, succeeding Angus McLagan; he held office until his death in 1952. He served as FOL President during a time of difficulty for the labour movement, including the formation of the rival New Zealand Trade Union Congress in 1950, the bitter 1951 waterfront dispute, and political opposition from a resurgent National Party. However, colleagues recalled his calm, steadying influence; mediation rather than confrontation was his style. He worked well with FOL Vice-president Fintan Patrick Walsh, and was an exemplary representative for the New Zealand labour movement overseas, serving as a delegate to the World Trade Union Conferences in London in 1945 and in Paris in 1949, as well as to the International Labour Organization's conference in Geneva in 1949.

=== Death ===
A dapper, well-dressed man who was always smoking a pipe, Croskery suffered from chronic bronchitis and emphysema in later years. He died in Wellington on 18 August 1952; Emily had died a year earlier. They were survived by nine daughters and two sons.

Trade union offices
Preceded by Angus McLagan	President of the Federation of Labour; 1946–1952	Succeeded by Fintan Patrick Walsh
