= Christine Rankin =

New Zealand local politician and civil servant

- Born: Greymouth, New Zealand
- Political party: Conservative (2012–2015); Labour (1970s)

Christine Kathryn Rankin (born Greymouth c. 1954) is a New Zealand politician and former civil servant who served as head of the Department of Work and Income.

== Civil service career ==
Rankin joined the Department of Social Welfare (as it was then called) in 1978 as a temporary clerk, following the break-up of her first marriage. Rising through the ranks, she became the head of the Department of Work and Income in 1998. Her time as chief executive was controversial, with allegations of extravagant spending and a management style akin to a personality cult. Three official inquiries were prompted by the expenditure of $165,000 to charter an aircraft to fly staff to a meeting in Wairākei, including one by State Services Commissioner Michael Wintringham who found a lack of financial discipline, and Rankin’s performance bonus was withheld.

In 2001, after Wintringham chose not to reappoint Rankin, she sued him in the Employment Court for NZ$1.2 million. Rankin made allegations of sexism towards her by officials and ministers. Rankin lost the court case, but the evidence given during the hearing by Wintringham and Department of the Prime Minister and Cabinet chief executive Mark Prebble ensured that the case was the dominant political news topic of the year. Rankin was known for wearing short skirts and dangly earrings, and Prebble, for example, described her dress as "indecent" and "offensive".

She has since worked as a consultant and public speaker, and was a panellist on the show How's Life? in 2002. She is chief executive of Lake Taupō Hospice.

== Political career ==
In her 20s Rankin was a member of the Labour Party, serving as the Albany branch secretary.

In 2007 she was elected to the Auckland Regional Council, as the representative of the North Shore constituency. She gained appointment as a commissioner of the-then Families Commission in 2009; her term ended in 2013. At the 2010 Auckland local-body elections she stood in the North Shore ward where she finished fourth and was not elected, however she won election to the Upper Harbour Local Board and to the Waitematā District Health Board. She was re-elected to the health board and local board at the 2013 elections.

Rankin joined the board of the Conservative Party of New Zealand in 2012 and became the Party's CEO in 2013. At the 2014 general election she was a candidate for the Conservative Party in the Epsom electorate, and was also ranked second on the Conservative party list. However, the Conservative Party did not achieve the necessary 5% of the party vote to qualify for list seats, so she was not elected. She resigned from the Conservative Party on 23 June 2015 after losing confidence in the founder, Colin Craig.

On 7 September 2016, Christine Rankin testified in a defamation lawsuit brought by the New Zealand Taxpayers' Union founder Jordan Williams against the former Party leader Colin Craig. Williams had filed legal action against Craig after the latter claimed that Williams had lied when he said that Craig sexually harassed his press secretary Rachel MacGregor. During the trial, Rankin testified that Craig had disclosed details of his relationship with MacGregor and that this revelation had led her to lose confidence in Craig's leadership of the Conservative Party.

Rankin was Deputy Mayor of Taupō District Council from November 2019 to October 2022. In 2022, she stood for the mayoralty and came second. She was re-elected as a councillor with the highest number of votes.

== Personal life ==
Rankin was born in Greymouth to Walter, a coalminer and later a prison guard, and Sylvia Parker from Blackball, West Coast. She was raised as Catholic. The family moved to Christchurch, where she attended Villa Maria College and then Rangitoto College in Auckland. In 2005 she converted to the Soka Gakkai International tradition of Nichiren Buddhism. She has been married four times and has two sons. In 2006 she competed on Dancing with the Stars.
