= Don Hunn =

New Zealand diplomat and civil servant

Don Hunn CNZM

Chairman of the State Services Commission
- In office 1986–1987
- Prime Minister: David Lange
- Preceded by: Roderick Deane

Chief Commissioner of the State Services Commission
- In office 1988–1988
- Prime Minister: David Lange

State Services Commissioner
- In office 1989–1997
- Prime Minister: David Lange, Geoffrey Palmer, Mike Moore, Jim Bolger
- Succeeded by: Michael Wintringham

High Commissioner
- In office 1976–1979
- Preceded by: Paul Cotton
- Succeeded by: Rod Gates

Personal details
- Born: 26 December 1934 (age 91)

Donald Kent Hunn CNZM (born Wellington 26 December 1934) is a senior New Zealand diplomat and civil servant. Hunn is the son of Sir Jack Hunn, a former Secretary of Defence, Maori Affairs, and Justice.

== Education ==
Hunn attended Wellington College and Victoria University of Wellington, where he earned a Master of Arts in History. He worked initially at the Public Trust.

== Diplomatic career ==
Hunn joined the New Zealand Ministry of Foreign Affairs in 1957. During the 1960s and 1970s, he had diplomatic postings in Washington, D.C., Suva, Kuala Lumpur and Brussels, and opened New Zealand's embassy in Chile. In 1976, Hunn became New Zealand's first resident High Commissioner to the Kingdom of Tonga. In 1980, Hunn was appointed Deputy High Commissioner to Canberra.

== State Services Commissioner ==
Hunn returned to New Zealand in 1982 as a State Services Commissioner. At the time, the State Services Commission comprised the Chairman, and three commissioners. In 1986, Hunn succeeded Roderick Deane as chief commissioner, and head of New Zealand's public service. In 1989, after a change in the legislation (specifically the State Sector Act 1988), Hunn became the sole commissioner.

During his time as SSC, Hunn was responsible for a major reorginatisation of the public service with the introduction of the State Sector Act 1988. This involved transforming the State Services Commission into the organisation responsible for selecting, employing, and managing the performance of government departmental chief executives, and providing oversight for the performance of the state sector as a whole.

In 1990, Hunn was awarded the New Zealand 1990 Commemoration Medal. He retired from the public service in 1997. In the 1997 New Year Honours, he was appointed a Companion of the New Zealand Order of Merit, for services as State Services Commissioner.

== Retirement ==
In his retirement, Hunn was appointed Chairman of New Zealand on Air. He also conducted a range of consulting assignments for foreign governments, as well as the New Zealand government, around state sector reform.

Hunn has been appointed to chair numerous New Zealand government reviews and inquiries, including the 1999 review of the activities of the Department of Work and Income, a review of "leaky building syndrome", the review of the 1999 General Election, the review of the organisation of Defence Services in New Zealand, among many others.

Hunn is presently a Fellow of the Victoria University School of Government, and a fellow of the New Zealand Institute of Public Administration. He served on the board of the Royal New Zealand Ballet for a period until February 2012.

In August 2007, State Services Commissioner Mark Prebble appointed Hunn to investigate the circumstances surrounding the resignation of Madeleine Setchell from the Ministry for the Environment, following allegations that Environment Minister David Benson-Pope used political influence to have her removed from her position.

== Personal life ==
Hunn married Janine Tattersfield in the 1960s, and the couple went on to have two children.

Government offices
Preceded by Roderick Deane	Chairman of the State Services Commission, Chief Commissioner of the State Services Commission, State Services Commissioner; 1986–1997	Succeeded by Michael Wintringham
