= The Blue Rose =

2013 New Zealand television series

- DVD cover
- Genre: Crime drama
- Created by: Rachel Lang; James Griffin
- Directed by: Mark Beesley; Simon Bennett; Michael Duignan; John Laing
- Starring: Antonia Prebble; Siobhan Marshall; Matt Minto; Rajeev Varma; Jennifer Ludlam
- Composer: Karl Steven
- Country of origin: New Zealand
- Original language: English
- No. of series: 1
- No. of episodes: 13

Production
- Executive producers: John Barnett; Rachel Lang; Chris Bailey
- Producer: Chris Bailey
- Cinematography: Marty Smith
- Running time: 43–45 minutes
- Production company: South Pacific Pictures

Original release
- Network: TV3
- Release: 4 February – 29 April 2013

The Blue Rose is a New Zealand crime drama television series, which was created by Rachel Lang and James Griffin and produced by South Pacific Pictures. It stars Antonia Prebble as Jane and Siobhan Marshall as Linda. Marshall and Prebble had previously worked together on Outrageous Fortune.

The series aired in New Zealand on TV3 from 4 February to 29 April 2013, at 8:30 p.m. for three episodes; it then moved to 9:30 p.m. for three episodes, and then moved again to 9:40 p.m. for five episodes, before moving to 9:45 p.m. on Mondays for the remaining two episodes.

== Production ==
Funding for the series was approved by NZ On Air in December 2011. The show was cancelled in December 2013, by a radio announcement on Radio New Zealand by TV3 programming boss Mark Caulton.

== Plot ==
Jane is a humble office temp who takes on a new post at an inner city law firm and soon realises she's not just filling in for a secretary with the flu – she's sitting in a dead woman's chair.

The deceased woman is Rose, whose best friend Linda is convinced that she was murdered despite police reports to the contrary. Linda quickly enlists Jane in her quest to find the truth, and together they recruit the IT guy and the lady from payroll and form the Society of the Blue Rose.

With some help from workers at other businesses, the group of four investigate crimes and corporate scandals to find out the truth about Rose, which prompts them to investigate more cases together.

== Cast and characters ==
=== Main ===
- Antonia Prebble as Jane March – A Temp P.A. to Simon at Mosely & Loveridge
- Siobhan Marshall as Linda Frame – Rose's best friend and godmother to her daughter Nina; manages a courier firm
- Matt Minto as Simon Frost – Jane's boss and Senior Partner at Mosely & Loveridge
- Rajeev Varma as Ganesh Nishad – An I.T. manager at Mosely & Loveridge
- Jenny Ludlam as Sonya Whitwell – An accountant who used to work at Mosely & Loveridge

=== Recurring ===
- James Trevena-Brown as Charlie Bryson – a junior lawyer at Mosely & Loveridge, whose father is a convicted fraudster
- Anna Jullienne as Krystle Wilkinson – Helen's snide P.A. at Mosely & Loveridge
- George Mason as Ben Gallagher – Jane's boyfriend
- Stelios Yiakmis as Derek Peterson – a wealthy financier and entrepreneur
- Theresa Healey as Helen Irwin – Simon's partner at Mosely & Loveridge
- Luciane Buchanan as Aroha Nash – a receptionist at Mosely & Loveridge
- Tim Foley as Grant Finch – Rose's ex-husband
- Caren Pistorius as Rose Harper – Simon's former P.A. at Mosely & Loveridge (flashbacks)
- Jay Saussey as Amy – Peterson's P.A.
- Jeremy Randerson as Adam Revill
- Kyle Pryor as Anton
- Josephine Davison as Felicity Frost – Simon's wife
- John Rawls as Karl Villiers - Peterson's motorcycle thug
- Nisha Madhan as Varsha – Ganesh's cop friend
- Murray Keane as Keith Cranston - a New Zealand cabinet minister
- Ayşe Tezel as Hannah - a call girl and acquaintance of Rose

== Episodes ==
No.	Title	Directed by	Written by	Original release date	N.Z. viewers (thousand)
1	"There Is a Light That Never Goes Out"	Mark Beesley	Rachel Lang	4 February 2013	N/A
2	"What Difference Does It Make?"	Mark Beesley	Rachel Lang	11 February 2013	N/A
3	"Sheila Take a Bow"	Simon Bennett	Tiffany Zehnal and Rachel Lang	18 February 2013	N/A
4	"This Charming Man"	Simon Bennett	James Griffin	25 February 2013	N/A
5	"Pretty Girls Make Graves"	Michael Duignan	Rachel Lang	4 March 2013	N/A
6	"Paint a Vulgar Picture"	Michael Duignan	Kate McDermott	11 March 2013	N/A
7	"Money Changes Everything"	Michael Duignan	James Griffin	18 March 2013	N/A
8	"Half a Person"	John Laing	Kate McDermott	25 March 2013	N/A
9	"Suffer Little Children"	John Laing	Matthew J. Saville and Rachel Lang	1 April 2013	N/A
10	"Handsome Devil"	Michael Duignan	Fiona Samuel and Rachel Lang	8 April 2013	N/A
11	"This Night Has Opened My Eyes"	Michael Duignan	Jan Prettejohns	15 April 2013	N/A
12	"Girl Afraid"	Mark Beesley	Kate McDermott	22 April 2013	N/A
13	"Hand in Glove"	Mark Beesley	Rachel Lang	29 April 2013	N/A

- ^{a} Number includes additional viewers from a 9:30 p.m. rebroadcast airing the same night on TV3 Plus 1.
- Each episode title is named after a song by The Smiths.

== Broadcast ==
In Australia, the show premiered on Gem on 26 November 2013.

== Awards and nominations ==
Year	Award	Category	Nominee	Result	Ref
2013	Monte-Carlo Television Festival Golden Nymph	Drama TV Series	The Blue Rose	Nominated	
2013	Rialto Channel New Zealand Film Awards Television Award	NZ On Air Best Television Feature or Drama Series	The Almighty Johnsons	Nominated	
2014	New York Festivals Bronze World Medal	Drama	Rachel Lang, James Griffin, Chris Bailey and John Barnett	Won	

== DVD release ==
Title	Set details	DVD release dates	Special features
Title	Set details	Region 4	Special features
The Blue Rose	Discs: 3; Episodes: 13	1 May 2013	Interviews with cast; Alternate endings
