= Michael Wintringham =

New Zealand public servant

Michael Wintringham CNZM

State Services Commissioner
- In office 1997 – May 2004
- Prime Minister: Jim Bolger; Jenny Shipley; Helen Clark
- Preceded by: Don Hunn
- Succeeded by: Mark Prebble

Personal details
- Born: Michael Charles Wintringham; 1947 (age 78–79) Blenheim, New Zealand

Michael Charles Wintringham CNZM (born 1947) is a New Zealand public servant. He served as State Services Commissioner, head of New Zealand's public service, from 1997 to 2004.

Wintringham was born in Blenheim, went to St John's College, Hastings, and has a BA (Hons) degree from Victoria University of Wellington. He started his career in the New Zealand Treasury in 1970, and between 1980 and 1984 was posted to Washington as economic counsellor at the New Zealand Embassy. He then worked as an assistant auditor-general, before leaving the public service to work for a management consultancy in Wellington.

Wintringham was appointed chief executive of the Ministry of Housing by State Services Commissioner Don Hunn. In 1997, Wintringham succeeded Hunn as State Services Commissioner and head of New Zealand's public service.

In 2001, Wintringham was sued in the Employment Court for NZ$1.2 million by former Work and Income New Zealand chief executive Christine Rankin. Incoming social welfare minister Steve Maharey criticised Rankin's personal and management style as chief executive in 1999, and Wintringham chose not to reappoint Rankin to the role in 2001. Rankin made allegations of sexism towards her by officials and ministers. Rankin lost the court case, but some of the evidence given during the hearing by Wintringham and Department of the Prime Minister and Cabinet chief executive Mark Prebble was embarrassing to all involved, and was the dominant political news topic of the year.

External image
- Michael Wintringham

Mark Prebble succeeded Wintringham as State Services Commissioner in 2004. Wintringham subsequently became a member of the Remuneration Authority, which sets the rate of pay for MPs, in 2005, and was appointed chairman of the authority in 2009. Wintringham is also chairman of the Earthquake Commission.

In the 2005 New Year Honours, Winringham was appointed a Companion of the New Zealand Order of Merit, for public services as State Services Commissioner.

Preceded by Don Hunn	State Services Commissioner; 1997-2004	Succeeded by Mark Prebble
