= Preble =

Preble may refer to:

== People ==
- Edward Preble (1761–1807), U.S. naval officer
- Edward Alexander Preble (1871–1957), American naturalist and conservationist
- George H. Preble (1816–1885), U.S. naval officer, nephew of Edward Preble
- J. Q. Preble (1826–1909), founder of J. Q. Preble, a producer of children's books and stationery
- T. M. Preble (1810–1907), American Free Will Baptist minister and Millerite preacher

== Places ==
- Preble, Indiana, a town
- Preble, New York, a town
- Preble, Wisconsin, a former town now part of Green Bay
- Preble County, Ohio
- Preble Township, Adams County, Indiana
- Preble Township, Fillmore County, Minnesota

== Military ==
- USS Preble, various ships
- Fort Preble, South Portland, Maine
- Preble Hall at the United States Naval Academy

== Other uses ==
- Preble Box Toe Company explosion, which occurred in 1928 in Lynn, Massachusetts
- Preble High School, located in Green Bay, Wisconsin

== See also ==
- Prebble, a surname
