= Tom Skinner (trade unionist) =

New Zealand politician and Trades Union leader

Sir Tom Skinner KBE KStJ JP
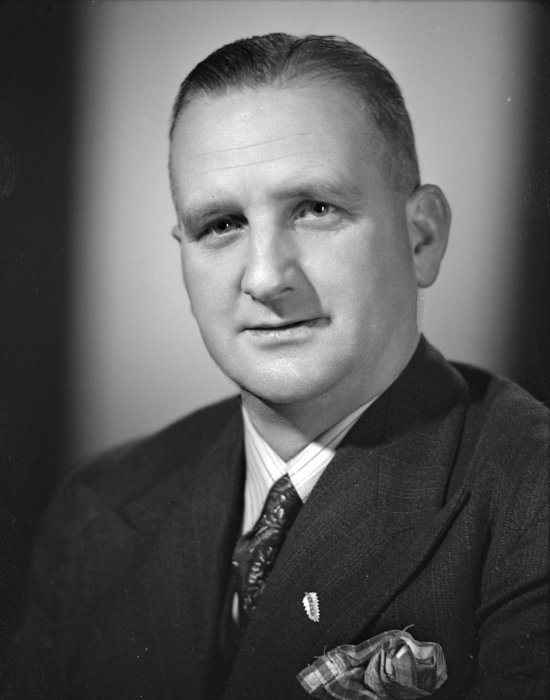
- Skinner c. 1959

4th President of the Federation of Labour
- In office 20 August 1963 – 2 May 1979
- Vice President: James Napier (1963–1972); James Boomer (1972–79)
- Preceded by: Fintan Patrick Walsh
- Succeeded by: Jim Knox

Member of the New Zealand Parliament for Tamaki
- In office 27 November 1946 – 30 November 1949
- Preceded by: seat created
- Succeeded by: Eric Halstead

Personal details
- Born: Thomas Edward Skinner; 18 April 1909 Mangaweka, New Zealand
- Died: 11 November 1991 (aged 82) Auckland, New Zealand
- Party: Labour
- Spouses: Martha May Wangford (m. 1931; div. 1942) Mary Ethel "Molly" Yardley (m. 1942)
- Children: 3

Sir Thomas Edward Skinner KBE KStJ JP (18 April 1909 – 11 November 1991) was a New Zealand politician and Trades Union leader.

Sir Tom served as President of the Auckland Trades Council from 1954 to 1976, and President of the New Zealand Federation of Labour from 1959 until 1979. Skinner was known as a conciliatory and accommodating political leader, and in the 1970s he was seen as the voice of unionism in New Zealand. He served on several international union forums, including a spell as a member of the body controlling the International Labour Organization. He was instrumental in founding the Shipping Corporation of New Zealand, and was knighted in 1976.

== Early life ==
Skinner was born in Mangaweka in 1909, the third child and eldest son in a family of five. His father was a South African-born plumber (also Thomas Edward Skinner); his mother was Australian-born Alice (née Chalk). The family moved to Auckland when Skinner was five, and he attended Bayfield school in Herne Bay. After leaving school he became an apprentice plumber, and established a plumbing business after finishing his apprenticeship. An accident on a motor-cycle left him unable to continue this work, and he had several other jobs until his health enabled him to return to plumbing. It was during the course of one of these jobs, as a milkman, that Skinner was first exposed to industrial action and union politics.

Skinner married Martha May Wangford in December 1931. In December 1937, the Skinner family became the first tenants of a state house in Coates Avenue, Ōrākei. Prime Minister Michael Joseph Savage helped carry furniture in through the front door (as he had with the first state house in Miramar, Wellington in September). This marriage was to produce one son but end in divorce. His second marriage to Mary Ethel "Molly" Yardley on 17 October 1942 resulted in a daughter and another son.

== Union involvement ==
New Zealand Parliament
Years	Term	Electorate	Party
1946–1949	28th	Tamaki	Labour

Skinner became secretary of the Auckland branch of the New Zealand Plumbers Union in 1940, and soon became involved in other smaller unions such as the Auckland Musicians Union, and also with the New Zealand Labour Party. In 1944 he stood unsuccessfully for the Auckland City Council on a Labour Party ticket. In 1946 he was Labour candidate for the Tamaki electorate, though had initially hoped to win nomination for the safe seat of Ponsonby, winning the marginal seat by a slender margin. Skinner was resentful towards Ritchie Macdonald who won the nomination for the Ponsonby seat leaving him with the more marginal seat of Tamaki. Labour was defeated in the following election in 1949, and his seat was lost to National's Eric Halstead. He stood for the seat again at the next election in 1951 but was again unsuccessful. Skinner declined a request to stand for parliament again in the Otahuhu seat at the 1954 election.

Skinner returned to his union career, becoming one of the new leaders of the movement after the disastrous 1951 Waterfront dispute. In 1952 he was elected vice president of the Auckland Trades Council and became president two years later, a position he retained for over 20 years. In 1959 Skinner was elected vice president of the New Zealand Federation of Labour and became president on the death of Fintan Patrick Walsh in 1963. As a leader, he was more conciliatory than his firebrand predecessor and encouraged several disaffected unions to rejoin the national body.

Skinner's conciliatory style served him well during the following years, as the late 1960s saw a rise in union restlessness with a government-controlled wage-fixing system. While he lost the vote on some key union policies, his strategy of directly approaching employers and individual unions to get them to work towards compromise solutions was frequently far more effective than his opponents' calls for the widespread use of direct action. By the late 1960s, collective bargaining was a well-established part of industrial relations. Skinner's 16-year leadership of the FoL was marked by his attempts to find consensus and avoid division wherever possible — traits possibly born out of the aftermath of the 1951 dispute. By the 1970s, Skinner was seen as the voice of unionism in New Zealand, and served on several international union forums, including a spell as a member of the body controlling the International Labour Organization.

With the election of Norman Kirk's Labour government in 1972, Skinner was able to have more say, indirectly, on policy. He was instrumental in founding the Shipping Corporation of New Zealand, and was its deputy chairman. A new Industrial Relations Act passed by the government was negotiated with the FOL and the Employers' Federation. The 1975 general election saw a return to power of Robert Muldoon and the National Party, which was elected on a strong anti-union platform. The introduction of a wage freeze in 1976 and amendments to the Industrial Relations Act which changed the definition of strikes and lockouts and increased penalties against striking workers led to demands for union action. Although many unions went on strike, a serious crisis was averted. Skinner was criticised by several unions for his moderate stance, but a vote on his leadership at the FoL's 1976 conference showed he still had overwhelming support. Skinner's more moderate stance had the additional benefit that – while publicly opposed, Skinner and Muldoon (coincidentally the Member of Parliament for Skinner's old Tamaki seat) established a working relationship that allowed progress to be made on government industrial policy to both sides' benefit. Like Muldoon he had made his way by "hard work and brains. Now they lived round the street from each other in plush Tamaki. Both liked whisky and would happily conspire and connive over a weekend evening, amidst the fumes of Scotch."

Skinner retired in 1979 and was replaced by the more militant Jim Knox. Knox's style led to a sidelining of Skinner, though he retained an involvement with the Shipping Corporation of New Zealand until the 1980s. After his wife died in 1985, Skinner spent his time largely out of the public spotlight. He died on 11 November 1991 in Auckland.

== Activities outside the union movement ==
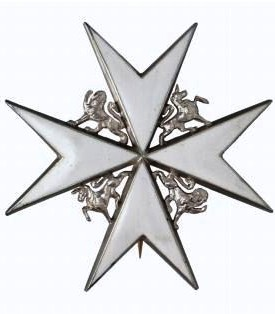
KStJ insignia

Skinner was heavily involved in many community organisations, most notably the St John Ambulance Association, but also among them the Royal New Zealand Coastguard and the New Zealand Institute for the Blind. He was also a director of private radio station Radio Pacific. Skinner was deputy chairman of the St John Ambulance Association's Auckland branch from 1958 to 1973 and chairman from 1973 to 1989. His sporting interests included yachting, cricket, and considerable involvement as a rugby league referee and administrator, and he managed the Kiwis' tour to Britain in 1960.

A member of the Priory of St John in New Zealand, Skinner was made a Knight of the Order of St John in 1970 for his contribution to the St John's Ambulance Association. In the 1976 New Year Honours, he was appointed a Knight Commander of the Order of the British Empire, for services to the trade union movement and the community.

Skinner's autobiography, Man to Man (co-written by John Berry), was published by Whitcoulls in 1980.

== Notes ==
Trade union offices
Preceded by Fintan Patrick Walsh	President of the Federation of Labour; 1963–1979	Succeeded by Jim Knox
New Zealand Parliament
New constituency	Member of Parliament for Tamaki; 1946–1949	Succeeded by Eric Halstead
