= State Sector Act 1988 =

Act of Parliament in New Zealand

New Zealand Parliament
- Long title: An Act— (a)To ensure that employees in the State services are imbued with the spirit of service to the community; and (b)To promote efficiency in the State services [and other agencies]; and (c)To ensure the responsible management of the State services; and (d)To maintain appropriate standards of integrity and conduct among employees in the State services [and other agencies]; and (e)To ensure that every employer in the State services is a good employer; and (f)To promote equal employment opportunities in the State services; and (g)To provide for the negotiation of conditions of employment in the State services [and assistance to other agencies on conditions of employment]; and (h)To repeal the State Services Act 1962, the State Services Conditions of Employment Act 1977, and the Health Service Personnel Act 1983
- Royal assent: 30 March 1988
- Commenced: 1 April 1988
- Administered by: State Services Commission

Repealed by
- Public Service Act 2020
- Status: Repealed

Before its repeal, the State Sector Act 1988 defined what constituted the State sector organisations in New Zealand. It (along with accompanying marketisation reforms) substantially reshaped the shape of the public service and to some extent its culture. It granted ministers some role in the appointments of departmental chief executives.

The Public Service Association view is that, "By establishing the individual departmental chief executive as the employer, the Act set up one of the main mechanisms by which the old public service was broken up from the mid-1980s."
