= Tom Prebble =

New Zealand educationalist (1945–2021)

Tom Prebble MNZM
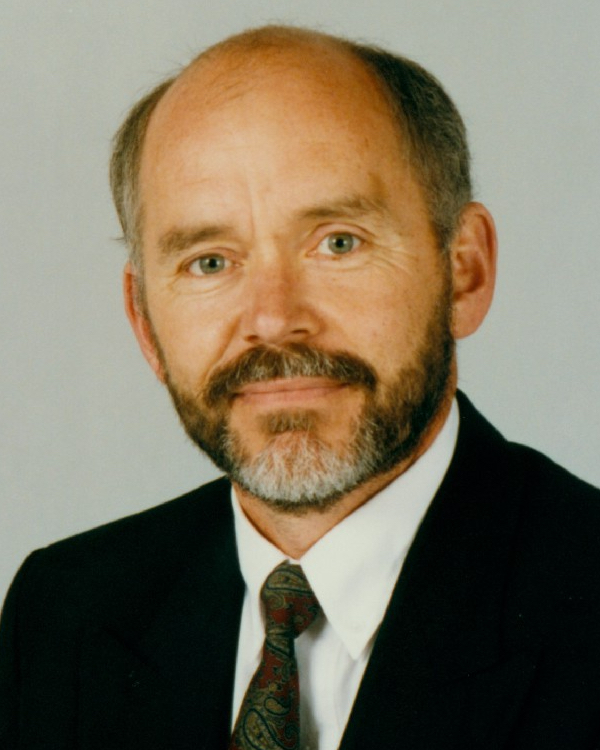
- Prebble in 1993
- Born: Thomas Kenneth Prebble; 29 November 1945; Sussex, England
- Died: 17 January 2021 (aged 75); Palmerston North, New Zealand
- Spouse: Bonnie Dewart
- Relatives: Richard Prebble (brother); Mark Prebble (brother); Antonia Prebble (niece)

Academic background
- Education: University of Alberta
- Thesis: The Jordan Plan: a case study in educational change (1975)

Academic work
- Discipline: Education administration
- Institutions: Massey University

Thomas Kenneth Prebble MNZM (November 1945 – 17 January 2021) was a New Zealand educationalist and university administrator.

== Biography ==
Born in Sussex, England, on 29 November 1945, Prebble was the son of Anglo-Catholic Anglican clergyman Kenneth Ralph Prebble and Mary Prebble (née Hoad). He moved to New Zealand in 1948 with his parents, older brother John, and younger brother Richard, when his father became vicar of Northcote parish in Auckland. John Prebble became a Queen's Counsel and professor of law at Victoria University of Wellington, Richard Prebble became a politician, and their younger brother, Mark Prebble, became the senior public servant of New Zealand.

After a PhD in education administration, completed in 1975 at the University of Alberta in Canada, Prebble was appointed a senior lecturer in the Department of Education at Massey University in Palmerston North, New Zealand. In 1986, he became the director of extramural studies at Massey, and in 1999 he was appointed the university's inaugural principal extramural and international. In 2002, he stood down from his administrative roles at Massey and was appointed to the Department of Social and Policy Studies in Education, retiring in 2004. He was promoted to full professor in 1994, and was conferred with the title of professor emeritus on his retirement.

Prebble was involved in establishing Massey's postgraduate programme in educational administration, the first in New Zealand. Between 2008 and 2015, he was a board member and director of Ako Aotearoa, the national centre for tertiary teaching excellence, and he also served on the councils of Otago Polytechnic and UCOL. He was elected a Fellow of the New Zealand Educational Administration Society in 1994.

In the 2019 New Zealand Honours, Prebble was appointed a Member of the New Zealand Order of Merit, for services to tertiary education. He died in Palmerston North on 17 January 2021, aged 75.
