= Jim Knox =

New Zealand truck driver, watersider, trade unionist, and rugby footballer

Jim Knox ONZ JP
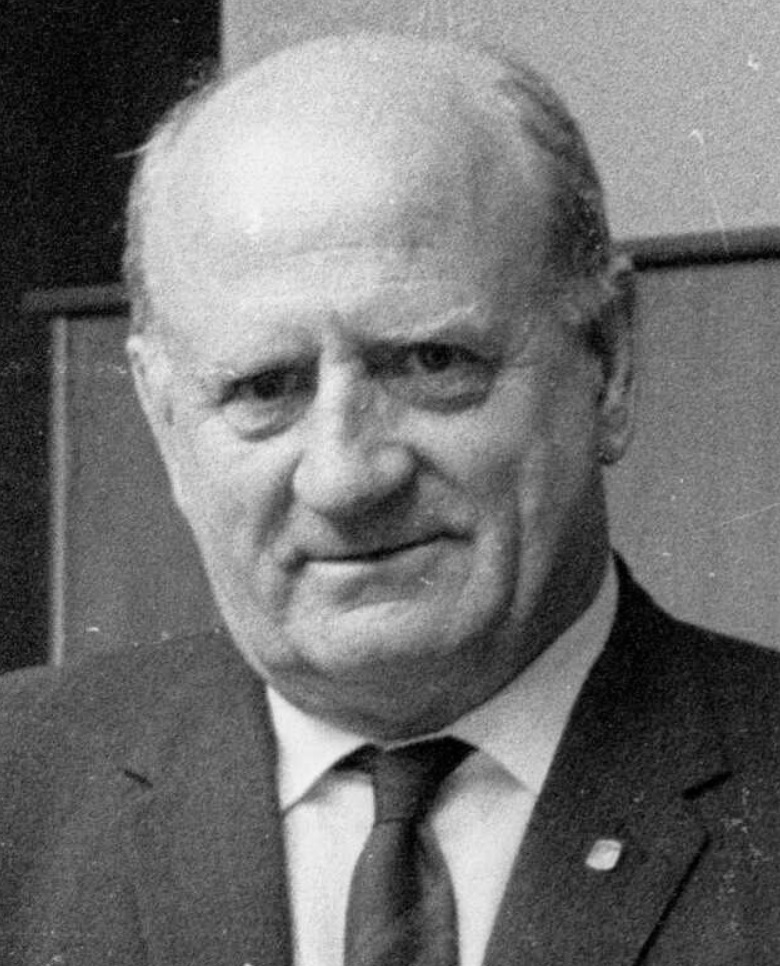
- Knox in 1969

5th President of the Federation of Labour
- In office 2 May 1979 – 20 October 1987
- Preceded by: Tom Skinner
- Succeeded by: Ken Douglas (Note: As President of the Council of Trade Unions)

Personal details
- Born: Walter James Knox; 6 March 1919 Auckland, New Zealand
- Died: 1 December 1991 (aged 72) Wellington, New Zealand
- Spouses: Margaret Joyce Svendsen (m. 1943; div. 1983) Elizabeth Watson Bell Curtis (m. 1983)
- Children: 2

Walter James Knox ONZ JP (6 March 1919 – 1 December 1991) was a leading New Zealand trade union leader. He was the seventh appointee to the Order of New Zealand.

== Early life and family ==
Knox was born in Auckland on 6 March 1919. His parents were Doris May (née Dodds) and Walter William Knox. Knox was educated at Auckland Normal School.

== Career and honours ==
Leaving school aged 15, Knox first worked in a foundry where he was badly scarred. Aged 16, he started an apprenticeship in the footwear trade upon his father's initiative. Knox worked as a truck driver and watersider, becoming involved in the 1951 waterside strike, and rose through the union ranks to become secretary of the Auckland District Woollen Mills Employees’ Union and vice president of the Auckland Trades Council in 1961. In 1969, Knox became secretary of the New Zealand Federation of Labour, working alongside the organisation's president, Sir Tom Skinner.

Skinner, Knox and other trade union leaders Ken Douglas, Bill Andersen, Pat Kelly, Blue Kennedy and Con Devitt were all well known in New Zealand 1980s due to ongoing industrial action.

In 1977, Knox was awarded the Queen Elizabeth II Silver Jubilee Medal. On 6 February 1988, he was the seventh appointee to the Order of New Zealand. In 1990, he received the New Zealand 1990 Commemoration Medal.

== Personal life ==
Knox played rugby union for the Suburbs club in Auckland before switching codes and playing rugby league for the City Rovers in the Auckland Rugby League competition. His sports injuries made him unfit for war service during World War II.

Knox was married twice, first to Margaret Joyce Svendsen in 1943, they had two children and a long marriage, then to Elizabeth Watson Bell Curtis (née Norrie) in 1983.

Trade union offices
Preceded by Tom Skinner	President of the Federation of Labour; 1979–1987	Succeeded by Ken Douglas
