= Antonia Prebble =

New Zealand actress

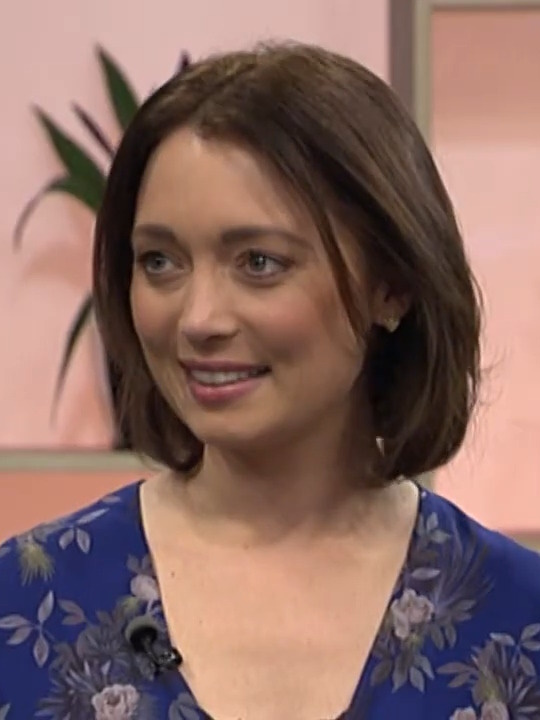
- Prebble in 2018
- Born: Antonia Mary Prebble; Wellington, New Zealand
- Education: Victoria University of Wellington
- Occupations: Actress, TV presenter, model
- Years active: 1993–present
- Known for: Outrageous Fortune, Westside
- Spouse(s): Dan Musgrove (2024–present)
- Children: 2
- Relatives: Tom Prebble (uncle); Richard Prebble (uncle); Mark Prebble (uncle)
- Website: antoniaprebble.com (defunct)

Antonia Mary Prebble is a New Zealand actress, best known for her role as Loretta West in the hit NZ comedy-drama Outrageous Fortune, as Trudy in The Tribe, as Jane in The Blue Rose, and as Rita West, the grandmother of her character in Outrageous Fortune, on the prequel series Westside. Internationally she's best known for her role as Clare Langtree, the Gatekeeper in the 2006 series Power Rangers Mystic Force.

== Early life and education ==
Born in Wellington, New Zealand, Antonia Mary Prebble is the middle of three children of John Prebble, a Sussex-born barrister and solicitor and a law professor at Victoria University of Wellington, and Nicola Mary Riddiford, an English teacher; Prebble has an older sister, Becky, and a younger brother, Ben, both of whom studied law. Her uncle Richard Prebble is a former politician, her uncle Mark Prebble is the former head of the State Services Commission, and her uncle Tom Prebble was a university administrator and professor emeritus.

Prebble attended Queen Margaret College between 1999 and 2001 and was prefect in charge of arts and proxime accessit in her final year. She then matriculated to Victoria University of Wellington, where she studied a Bachelor of Arts in Linguistics. Initially, Prebble had been studying for a Bachelor of Laws before she switched programs.

Prebble speaks fluent French.

== Career ==
Prebble became interested in acting at an early age, starring in the stage play The Magical Kingdom of Thingymijig in 1993. In the late 1990s she started to work a lot with New Zealand children's TV production companies, with starring and guest roles in several programmes. Her roles included Mandy McFarlane in the second season of Mirror, Mirror in 1997, and Trudy in five series' of The Tribe from 1999 to 2003. She also guest starred in two episodes of Power Rangers: Dino Thunder as Krista, alongside two of her fellow cast members from The Tribe. In 2006, she began her role in Power Rangers: Mystic Force as Clare Langtree, the Gatekeeper and Udonna's apprentice.

Prebble made a cameo appearance in the band Flip Grater's music video for "Careful" and hosted New Zealand's WNTV (What Now Television) from 2002 to 2003.

In 2005, she was cast in the new New Zealand comedy-drama Outrageous Fortune as 15-year-old movie buff Loretta West. At the end of the fifth series, Loretta married Hayden Peters (played by Shane Cortese), her partner and the father of her child. In February 2010, filming wrapped for the sixth and final series. By this time, Loretta West had become a smart and successful business entrepreneur and a madame of a brothel. The final episode of the series aired 9 November 2010.

Prebble had a cameo role in the TVNZ series The Almighty Johnsons as a red-herring for the identity of the Norse goddess, Frigg in the show's first season in 2011. The real 'Frigg' was eventually played by Siobhan Marshall, Prebble's former co-star and on-screen sister on Outrageous Fortune.

Prebble and Marshall teamed up again in 2013 for a mystery thriller series, The Blue Rose.

In 2015 she had the lead role of Rita West in Westside, a prequel to Outrageous Fortune, playing the grandmother (as a young woman) of her character from the original series.

Prebble has given birth on screen five times, starting with The Tribe as a 14-year-old, then Outrageous Fortune, a short film, White Lies, and a play as Mary mother of Jesus ("who just popped out .... and we all sang a song").

Since 2016, Antonia has been an ambassador for New Zealand department store Smith & Caughey's. Prebble was the face of Smith & Caughey's Spring 2018 campaign and lookbook, photographed and styled in a series of images by fashion photographer Nicole Ku. Antonia Prebble has featured on the covers of Next Magazine, Remix Magazine, Mindfood Style, and Fashion Quarterly.

In early 2019, Prebble frequented New Zealand TV show The Project after having her first child with Dan Musgrove. During the same year she featured in the music video for "Help You Now" by Auckland band Alae.

In April 2020, Prebble participated in an Outrageous Fortune virtual greeting in the fight against the coronavirus pandemic.

On 19 November 2020, Prebble was the guest host on The Project before the final episode of Westside.

In November 2022, Prebble joined the cast of Shortland Street as Dr Rebekah Anderson.

In 2023 Prebble alongside Madeleine Sami-filmed NZ series Double Parked.

In late 2022 Prebble was announced as part of the cast for SBS legal drama Safe Home and in 2023, the series aired with Prebble playing the role of Grace MacDonald.

== Personal life ==
In 2016, Prebble began dating her then Westside co-star, Dan Musgrove. The couple announced their engagement in July 2018 and pregnancy in February 2019. They married in 2024 and have two children together.

== Filmography ==
=== Film ===
Year	Title	Role	Notes
2013	White Lies	Rebecca	
2014	The Cure	Beth Wakefield	
2015	Timeslow	Amelia	
2017	Pork Pie	Suzie Davidson	
2017	A Woman's Right to Shoes	Hayley	Short
2025	Heart Eyes	Jane	

=== Television ===
Year	Title	Role	Notes
1997–1998	Mirror, Mirror II	Mandy McFarlane	Main role
1999	A Twist in the Tale	Jem	Episode: "A Crack in Time"
1999–2003	The Tribe	Trudy	Main role
2001	Dark Knight	Ruth	Episode: "Damned"
2002–2003	WNTV	Toni	Main role; host
2004	Power Rangers Dino Thunder	Krista	Episodes: "The Passion of Conner", "Thunder Struck: Part II"
2005	Interrogation	Saskia	Episode: "Where There's Smoke"
2005	Power Rangers S.P.D.	Nova Ranger (voice)	Episode: "Endings: Part II"
2005–2010	Outrageous Fortune	Loretta West	Main role: Granddaughter of Rita West in "Westside"
2006	Power Rangers Mystic Force	Clare Langtree	Regular role
2006	The Lost Children	Caterina	Episode: "1.11"
2010	Spies and Lies	Mavis	TV film
2011	The Almighty Johnsons	Sonja Freeman	Episode: "God's Gift to Zebras"
2011	Super City	Toni	Episodes: "1.1", "1.4", "1.5"
2012	Auckland Daze	Antonia	Episode: "1.1"
2013	The Blue Rose	Jane March	Main role
2014	Salem	Bridget Bishop	Episode: "The Stone Child"
2014	Anzac Girls	Hilda Steele	TV miniseries
2015	Winter	Alesia Taylor	Main role
2015–2020	Westside	Rita West	Main role
2017	Stand Up Girl	Drunk Bride	Episode: "Decent Woman"
2017	Sisters	Edie Flanagan	Main role
2017	My Life Is Murder	Ramona Church	Episode: "Hidden Gems"
2020	Power Rangers Beast Morphers	Astronema/Karone (voice)	1 episode
2021	One of Us Is Lying	Robyn	2 episodes
2022–23	Shortland Street	Rebecka Anderson	50 episodes
2023	Safe Home	Grace Macdonald	Main role; 4 episodes
2023–24	Double Parked	Steph	Main role; 14 episodes
2026	The Brokenwood Mysteries	Annabella Flynn	Episode: "Death Has Four Strings"

== See also ==
- List of New Zealand television personalities
