= Roderick Deane =

New Zealand economist (born 1941)

Sir Roderick Deane KNZM
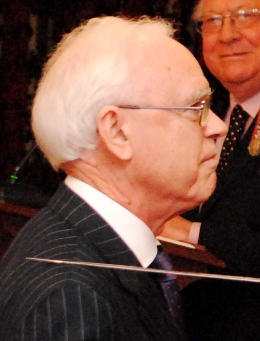

Chairman of the State Services Commission
- In office 1985–1986
- Prime Minister: David Lange
- Preceded by: Mervyn Probine
- Succeeded by: Don Hunn

Personal details
- Born: Roderick Sheldon Deane; 8 April 1941 (age 85) Auckland, New Zealand

Sir Roderick Sheldon Deane KNZM (born 8 April 1941) is a New Zealand economist, public servant, and businessman who was influential in public sector reform during the Rogernomics reforms of the Fourth Labour Government. He served as deputy governor of the Reserve Bank of New Zealand during the Third National Government, as Chairman of the State Services Commission and CEO of the Electricity Corporation of New Zealand during the Fourth Labour Government, and as CEO and chairman of Telecom New Zealand after its privatisation.

== Education ==
Born in Auckland, Deane grew up in Ōpunake and went to New Plymouth Boys' High School. He completed a Bachelor of Commerce degree with first-class honours in economics and a doctorate in economics at Victoria University of Wellington in 1968. During his doctoral research, Deane began corresponding with future Reserve Bank Governor Don Brash, forming a friendship that would continue throughout their careers.

== Career ==
=== Reserve Bank of New Zealand ===
Deane worked at the Reserve Bank of New Zealand, rapidly becoming Chief Economist, then Deputy Governor in 1982. During this period, Deane tended to clash with Prime Minister and Finance Minister Robert Muldoon, arguing for more economic liberalisation and sounder economic policies, although Deane described his personal relationship with Muldoon as "cordial" and "civil". Muldoon twice appointed a Governor to the Reserve Bank in preference to Deane.

Deane served as Alternate Executive Director of the International Monetary Fund from 1974 to 1976. While at the Reserve Bank, Deane published numerous papers on monetary, exchange-rate, and fiscal policy, as well as in the fields of international economics. He led a research-team which developed New Zealand's first macroeconometric model and published many papers in this area. He authored and edited a range of books on monetary policy and financial-sector matters, the external sector and foreign investment. Deane later became the inaugural winner of the NZIER Qantas "Economist of the Year" Award.

==== Currency and constitutional crisis of 1984 ====
In 1984, with the election of the Fourth Labour government, Deane led those elements within the Reserve Bank calling for a devaluation of the New Zealand dollar. Speculation on international markets that the incoming New Zealand government would devalue the currency led to the Reserve Bank needing to defend the fixed currency in the markets, causing losses of hundreds of millions of dollars. The defeated Prime Minister, Muldoon, refused to devalue the currency; a constitutional crisis ensued, during which the incoming Government directed Muldoon to devalue. During the crisis, Deane took the unprecedented step of closing the New Zealand currency to international trading pending settlement of the dispute.

=== State Services Commissioner ===
In 1986 Deane became Chairman of the State Services Commission, effectively the head of New Zealand's public service. Along with Minister of Finance Roger Douglas, Deane served as the principal architect of state-sector reform and corporatisation of New Zealand's State-Owned Enterprises. He also oversaw a range of other reforms to the public sector, including changes in the wage determination processes to liberalise these, the re-organization of the public service to reduce substantially the number of public servants and to improve the efficiency of many government departments, and changes designed to improve the clarity of objectives and the enhancement of accountabilities within the public sector. Due to the job losses resulting from these reforms, Deane was named "Dr Death" by union leaders.

In 1986–87 he was called on to investigate the Māori Loan Affair.

In 1987 Deane became Chief Executive of New Zealand's then-largest state-owned enterprise, the Electricity Corporation of New Zealand (ECNZ), often known as Electricorp. In this role, he oversaw the early deregulation of the New Zealand electricity market. Don Hunn succeeded Deane as State Services Commissioner.

=== Telecom Chief Executive ===
In November 1992, following the privatisation of Telecom as New Zealand's largest listed company, Deane became Chief Executive of the new entity. Under his tenure, Telecom became the country’s top performing public company as measured by investors’ wealth creation, following restructurings involving significant lay-offs. He held this role until his retirement on 1 October 1999, when he became the non-executive Chairman of Telecom. In the "Top 200 Corporate Awards", Deane became CEO of the Year in 1994, CEO of the Decade in 1999 and later Chairman of the Year.

=== Later corporate roles ===
Deane also served as Chairman of ANZ National Bank from 1999 and for many years as a Director of the ANZ Banking Group in Melbourne. In 2001, Deane presided over the break-up of Fletcher Challenge, then New Zealand’s largest conglomerate. He then served as Chairman of Fletcher Building, then New Zealand's largest listed company, until 2010. Deane also served as a Director of Woolworths, and on the advisory board of Pacific Road Corporate Finance.

From 2000, Deane chaired the Board of the National Museum of New Zealand, Te Papa Tongarewa, which encompasses what was previously the National Art Gallery. He formed the City Gallery Wellington Foundation and functioned for many years as its chairman. In 2006 Deane announced his resignation from these positions.

== Retirement and voluntary activities ==
Deane and his wife Gillian have been involved in arts philanthropy and served as Joint Patrons of the IHC New Zealand, the country's largest voluntary welfare organisation.

From 2000 to 2003, Deane held a personal Chair as Professor of Economics and Management at Victoria University of Wellington, which awarded him an honorary Doctorate of Laws.

== Honours ==
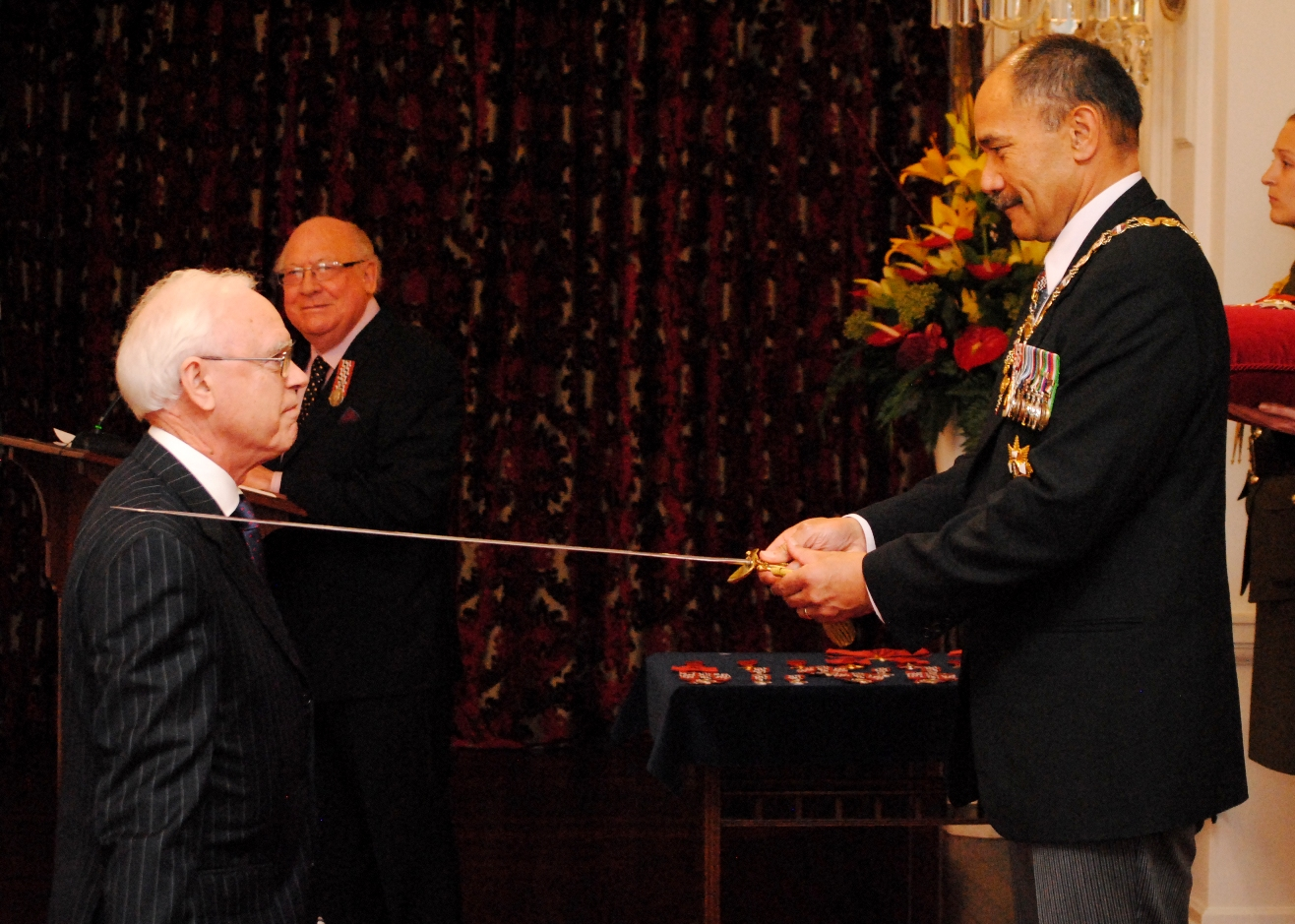
Deane's investiture as a Knight Companion of the New Zealand Order of Merit by the governor-general, Sir Jerry Mateparae, in 2012

In 1990, Deane was awarded the New Zealand 1990 Commemoration Medal. In 2009, he was inducted into the New Zealand Business Hall of Fame.

In the 2012 Queen's Birthday and Diamond Jubilee Honours, Deane was appointed a Knight Companion of the New Zealand Order of Merit.

== Sources ==
- Bassett, Michael; Bassett, Judith (2006). Roderick Deane: His Life and Times. Penguin Group. ISBN 978-0-670-04567-9.

Preceded by Mervyn Probine	State Services Commissioner; 1985–1986	Succeeded by Don Hunn
