= Minister for State Owned Enterprises =

New Zealand minister of the Crown

- Coat of Arms of New Zealand

- Flag of New Zealand

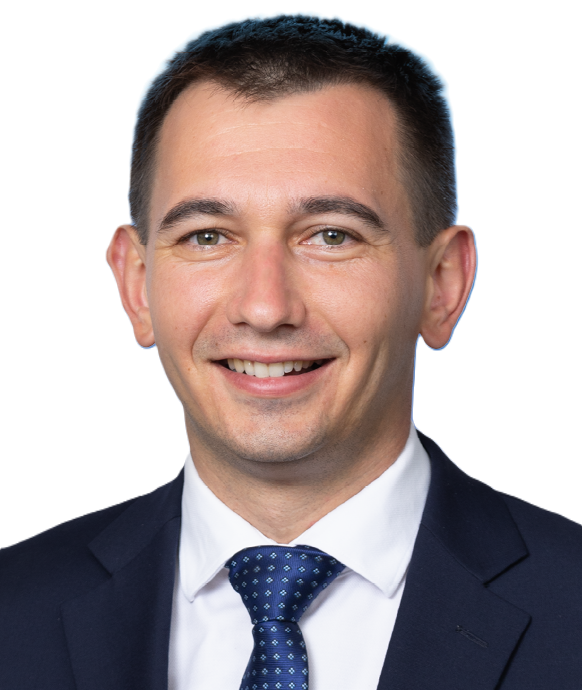
- Incumbent; Simeon Brown since 24 January 2025
- State-owned enterprises of New Zealand
- Style: The Honourable
- Member of: Cabinet of New Zealand; Executive Council
- Reports to: Prime Minister of New Zealand
- Appointer: Governor-General of New Zealand
- Term length: At His Majesty's pleasure
- Inaugural holder: Richard Prebble
- Formation: 1 August 1987
- Website: www.beehive.govt.nz

The Minister for State Owned Enterprises is the minister in the New Zealand Government responsible for trading enterprises owned by the New Zealand Government (see State-owned enterprises of New Zealand), usually in conjunction with the minister responsible for the industry.

The post was established by the Fourth Labour Government from 1 April 1987. Some of the SOEs were formerly trading departments, like the New Zealand Post Office and the New Zealand Railways Department.

== History ==
The following ministers have held the office of Minister for State Owned Enterprises.

Key

Labour National NZ First

No.	Name	Portrait	Term of Office		Prime Minister
1	Richard Prebble		1 August 1987	4 November 1988	Lange
2	David Lange		4 November 1988	8 November 1988	Lange
3	Stan Rodger		8 November 1988	9 February 1990	Lange
3	Stan Rodger		8 November 1988	9 February 1990	Palmer
(1)	Richard Prebble		9 February 1990	2 November 1990	Palmer
(1)	Richard Prebble		9 February 1990	2 November 1990	Moore
4	Doug Kidd		2 November 1990	3 October 1991	Bolger
5	Maurice McTigue		3 October 1991	27 March 1993	Bolger
6	Wyatt Creech		27 March 1993	29 November 1993	Bolger
7	Philip Burdon		29 November 1993	8 November 1996	Bolger
8	Jenny Shipley		16 December 1996	8 December 1997	Bolger
9	Tony Ryall		8 December 1997	10 December 1999	Shipley
10	Mark Burton		10 December 1999	20 December 2004	Clark
11	Paul Swain		20 December 2004	19 October 2005	Clark
12	Trevor Mallard		19 October 2005	19 November 2008	Clark
13	Simon Power		19 November 2008	13 April 2011	Key
(9)	Tony Ryall		13 April 2011	8 October 2014	Key
14	Todd McClay		8 October 2014	26 October 2017	Key
14	Todd McClay		8 October 2014	26 October 2017	English
15	Winston Peters		26 October 2017	6 November 2020	Ardern
16	David Clark		6 November 2020	1 February 2023	Ardern
16	David Clark		6 November 2020	1 February 2023	Hipkins
17	Duncan Webb		1 February 2023	27 November 2023	Hipkins
18	Paul Goldsmith		27 November 2023	24 January 2025	Luxon
19	Simeon Brown		24 January 2025	present	Luxon
