= Public Service Association =

Democratic union in New Zealand

PSA
- New Zealand Public Service Association
- Te Pūkenga Here Tikanga Mahi
- Formation: 31 October 1913; 113 years ago
- Type: Trade union
- Headquarters: Wellington
- Location: New Zealand
- Members: 90,000 (2024)
- President: Virgil D. Iraia
- Vice President: Dianna Mancer
- National Secretary: Fleur Fitzsimons
- National Secretary: Duane Leo
- Affiliations: NZCTU, IPANZ, Allied Health Aotearoa New Zealand, Tax Justice Aotearoa, PSI, UNI Global Union
- Funding: Member subscription fees
- Website: www.psa.org.nz

The Public Service Association (Māori: Te Pūkenga Here Tikanga Mahi), or PSA, is a democratic trade union with over 90,000 workers in the New Zealand public sector.

The stated aims of the PSA are to provide support for public and not-for-profit community services, support worker voices and participation though unions, ensure workplaces are free from discrimination, and advance the Te Tiriti o Waitangi principles of partnership, protection and participation, as they relate to the working lives of the union's members.

The PSA is affiliated with the New Zealand Council of Trade Unions and Public Services International but is forbidden, by its own rules, from affiliating with political parties or organisations.

== History ==
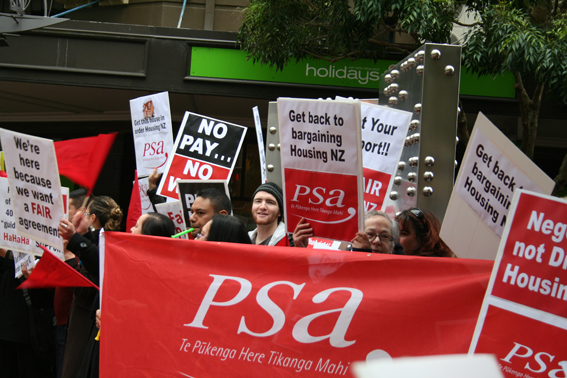
A PSA rally in 2010 during a dispute with Housing New Zealand

Though its origins go back to 1890, The New Zealand Public Service Association officially dates from 31 October 1913. The early history of the PSA is one of resistance to cuts in public service pay and conditions. Public servants were poorly paid and were often forced to take pay cuts when the economy stalled. In 1931, for example, all public servant salaries were cut by 10%. Many public servants suffered acute hardship. It was only loans from the Public Service Investment Society, set up by the PSA in 1928, that prevented many of them falling into further financial difficulty. Working conditions were sometimes poor and unhygienic. An overcrowded Wellington department was described by the PSA as "a compromise between a hot-house and a tin shed erected by amateur carpenters".

With a change of government in 1936, the PSA began to have some success with its advocacy for public servants. A five-day working week for public servants was introduced. Salaries were restored to 1931 levels, and public servants given the right to become politically involved.

By mid-century, the PSA was a confident, energetic organisation. In 1950 membership was nearly 30,000, 83% of the total public service roll. A major focus of the 1950s was discrimination against women, which was built into the salary scales. By the end of the decade the PSA advocacy had borne fruit, with the passing of Government Service Equal Pay Act.

By the 1970s the PSA was again in resistance mode as pressure came on public sector pay as a result of an economic downturn. It was a decade of political turbulence and industrial unrest. In 1979 the PSA faced the biggest crisis in its existence. In response to notice of strike action by electricity workers, the Government introduced the Public Service Association Withdrawal of Recognition Bill. The bill would have given the Government the power of seize all the assets of the union and vest them in the Public Trustee. In the face of mass protests and a PSA offer to submit the dispute to mediation, the Government backed down and withdrew the bill.

The 1980s presented more challenges. Privatisation of state assets and the restructuring of the public service saw thousands of PSA members made redundant. In 1987 the Government introduced the State Sector Bill which would have taken away most of the current conditions of employment. PSA members held massive protest meetings and a national strike in 1988. This ensured all current conditions were saved.

The early 1990s saw further attacks on unions. The Employment Contracts Act removed unions as a legal entity; unions were now called bargaining agents with very restricted rights. In the late 1990s, the PSA began looking at ways to break out of the negative relationships which were so common in the workplace at that time. It worked with the Government and State Services Commission to reassess and rebuild a public service decimated by a decade of economic reforms. It developed a new strategy, Partnership for Quality, which sought constructive engagement with government and employers.

In 2000, the first Quality for Partnership Agreement was signed by the PSA and the Government. In 2006 the union negotiated national pay rates for occupational groups in the health sector and has been successful in breaking the de facto wage freeze imposed on the public service with wage settlements in a number of large departments.

In 2010 the union successfully negotiated a collective employment agreement for its 6,000 local government members in Auckland when eight councils and a large number of council-controlled organisations were amalgamated into a single Auckland council.

Despite continuous cuts and restructuring in the public sector and legislation aimed at reducing the effectiveness of unions, PSA membership continues to grow, particularly in community-based services.

== Governance ==
=== Workplaces and sectors ===
Each PSA member in a workplace pays a membership subscription fee. Those fees provide the vast majority of the union's income.

Workplaces are grouped into five sectors:

- Public Service (Rātonga mahi ā te Kāwanatanga)
- District Health Boards (Pōari Hauora ā Rohe)
- State Sector (Rāngai Tūmatanui)
- Local Government (Kāwanatanga-ā-Rohe)
- Community Public Services (Rātonga Mahi ā Hāpori)

=== Groups ===
Members may also belong to national groups, and the following groups are represented on the union's committees:

- Te Rūnanga o Ngā Toa Āwhina: for those who identify as Māori
- Pasefika Network: for those who identify as Pacific Island people
- PSA Youth: for those who are aged 35 and under

=== Meetings and committees ===
Each workplace has an annual meeting. The delegates form a workplace committee and then elect a convenor. Delegate committees have positions for Te Rūnanga o Ngā Toa Āwhina and Pasefika Network.

Having consulted their members, the delegates in a sector elect their peers to the sector committee. The delegates on each sector committee elect two co-convenors, at least one of whom must be a woman, and the committee includes delegates from Te Rūnanga o Ngā Toa Āwhina, Pasefika Network and PSA Youth.

Every two years, a national delegates' congress is held. The current president, Virgil Iraia, was elected in at Congress in October 2024.

In between congresses, the executive board sets and oversees the implementation of policy. The board includes the president and leaders of Te Rūnanga o Ngā Toa Āwhina, Pasefika Network and PSA Youth.

== Office Holders ==
Below is a list of office holders in the PSA:

Presidents

	Name	Term	
1	John William Macdonald	1913	1916
2	George Allport	1916	1919
3	Bill Wright	1919	1922
4	Roy Sinel	1922	1925
5	H W C Mackintosh	1925	1926
6	J H McKay	1926	1928
7	Alfred Burgess	1928	1934
8	S Roberts	1934	1936
9	Thomas Pound	1936	1943
10	Bert O'Keefe	1943	1945
11	Jack Hunn	1945	1946
12	Jack Lewin	1946	1951
13	John Henry Tuohy	1951	1954
14	M T Mitchell	1954	1956
15	J T Ferguson	1956	1958
16	Dan Long	1958	1960
17	Jack Batt	1960	1964
18	G H Sorrell	1964	1965
19	Barry Tucker	1965	1968
20	Ray Hannan	1968	1970
21	Stan Rodger	1970	1973
(17)	Jack Batt	1973	1974
22	Jim Turner	1974	1978
23	David Thorp	1978	1982
24	Colin Hicks	1983	1988
25	Sue Piper	1988	1992
26	Graham Curtis	1992	1993
27	Huki Nepia	1993	
28	D J Scott	1993	1994
29	Tony Simpson	1994	1997
30	Ian Bamber	1997	
31	Na Raihania	1997	1998
32	Kathy Higgins	1998	1999
(30)	Ian Bamber	1999	2004
33	Keith Gutsell	2004	2008
34	Paula Scholes	2009	2012
35	Mike Tana	2012	2016
36	Janet Quigley	2016	2021
37	Benedict Ferguson	2021	2024
38	Virgil Iraia	2024	present

General Secretaries

Names in italics indicate acting General Secretaries

	Name	Term	
1	Frank Millar	1913	1944
-	S H B Symons	1944	1945
2	John Turnbull	1945	1961
3	Dan Long	1961	1976
-	M T Mitchell	1976	
4	Barry Tucker	1976	1985
5	Colin Clark	1985	1991
6	David Thorp	1991	1999

In 1999 the PSA changed its constitution replacing the general secretary position with three national secretaries.

== Notable members ==
- Lettie Allen, former PSA national executive member
- Rona Bailey, former president of the PSA women's committee
- Camilla Belich, former lawyer at the PSA
- Matt Benney, former vice-president of the PSA
- Fleur Fitzsimons, current PSA national secretary
- Nancy McShane, PSA delegate and equal pay campaigner
- Brenda Pilott, National Secretary of PSA from 2004 to 2014
- Mark Prebble, former PSA Treasurer

== Books ==
- No Easy Victory: Towards equal pay for women in the government service, 1890–1960 by Margaret Corner
- White-collar Radical:Dan Long and the rise of the white-collar unions by Mark Derby
