= Shipping Corporation of New Zealand =

New Zealand shipping company

- Company type: Statutory Corporation (1974–1987); State-owned Enterprise (1987–1989)
- Industry: Transport
- Founded: 1974
- Key people: Sir John Ormond (Chairman 1974 – 1979); Sir Tom Skinner (Chairman 1979 – 1982)
- Products: Sea transport

The Shipping Corporation of New Zealand was a New Zealand shipping company created by the Third Labour Government led by Norman Kirk in 1973.

== Background ==
Norman Kirk advocated for the creation of a New Zealand-owned shipping line as leader of the Opposition, which was Labour's policy at the 1969 and 1972 elections. Kirk argued that "the New Zealand farmer has always been at the mercy of the overseas shipping companies." Upon election to office following the 1972 general election, Kirk moved quickly to establish the shipping line, appointing former Meat Board chairman John Ormond as chairman and Federation of Labour President Tom Skinner as his deputy. The Shaw Savill Line offered two vessels, the Laurentic and the Zealandic, for the shipping line.

== Formation ==
The Shipping Corporation of New Zealand Act 1973 established the corporation as a statutory corporation, which began trading in 1974. The New Zealand Government owned a majority of shares, while the Shaw Savill Line had a 30% stake in the shipping line.

The Shipping Corporation adopted a new trading name on 1 September 1985, New Zealand Line, to emphasis its international links.

== State-owned enterprise ==
From 1 April 1987 the Shipping Corporation became the Shipping Corporation of New Zealand Limited, along with other government-owned departments and corporations, became a State-owned enterprise, and was required to make a profit.

== Privatisation ==
In the 1987 budget, it was announced that the New Zealand Line would be sold. The New Zealand Line was privatised in March 1989, being sold to P&O for $33.5 million.

== References and citations ==
=== References ===
- Farquhar, I.J. (1996). Jack of All Trades, Master of None: The Shipping Corporation of New Zealand Limited 1973–1989. Wellington, NZ: New Zealand Ship & Marine Society. ISBN 0959783458.
- Hayward, Margaret (1981). Diary of the Kirk Years. Auckland: Reed Publishing. ISBN 0589013505.
