= Mark Prebble =

New Zealand civil servant

Mark Prebble CNZM
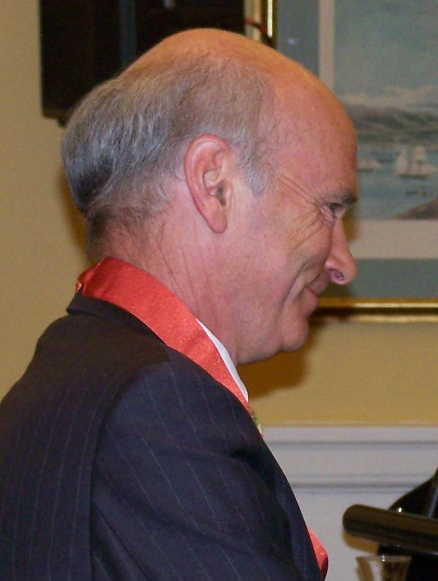
- Prebble in 2009

State Services Commissioner
- In office May 2004 – 30 June 2008
- Prime Minister: Helen Clark
- Preceded by: Michael Wintringham
- Succeeded by: Iain Rennie

Deputy Secretary to the Treasury

Secretary of the Department of the Prime Minister and Cabinet
- In office 1998–2004
- Preceded by: Simon Murdoch

Personal details
- Born: 1951 (age 74–75) Auckland, New Zealand
- Relatives: Richard Prebble (brother); Tom Prebble (brother); Antonia Prebble (niece)

Mark Prebble CNZM (born 1951) is a former New Zealand civil servant. He was the State Services Commissioner, head of New Zealand's public service from May 2004 until 30 June 2008. On 25 January 2008, Prebble announced his retirement after 32 years in the Public Service.

== Early life and education ==
Prebble was born in Auckland, New Zealand, the youngest son of Kenneth Prebble, a one-time vicar of St Paul's Church, Auckland, who later became Archdeacon of Hauraki. His mother was Mary Hoad. He has five siblings, including former Labour Cabinet Minister and ACT Party leader Richard Prebble, Victoria University law professor John Prebble, and Massey University professor of education administration Tom Prebble.

Prebble was educated at the University of Auckland, where he graduated with an MA in Economics, and at Victoria University of Wellington, where he earned a doctorate in public policy in 1990. His thesis was titled An Integrated Approach to Redistribution: Issues of Policy, Economics and Information. Prebble tutored economics at Auckland and Wellington.

== Career ==
Prebble joined the Treasury in 1977, rising to Deputy Secretary of the Department, and acted as Acting Secretary twice. While in non-executive roles at the Treasury, he was an organiser for the Public Service Association, the principal trade union for public servants.

In 1998, Prebble became Secretary of the Department of the Prime Minister and Cabinet, succeeding Simon Murdoch. At the time, Labour Opposition leader Helen Clark criticised the appointment, describing Prebble as an "apostle of the New Right". Upon winning the 1999 election, however, Clark reappointed Prebble to the role, and is understood to have worked closely with him. While Secretary Prebble received publicity for describing Work and Income New Zealand chief executive Christine Rankin's clothes as "indecent". He was involved in the Corngate affair, for not releasing four documents after Clark ordered all official papers to be released during the 2002 election campaign.

In 2004, Prebble was appointed State Services Commissioner, as the head of New Zealand's public service, succeeding Michael Wintringham. He was involved in investigations into the dismissal of the Environment ministry communications manager Madeleine Setchell, which led to the resignation of Environment Minister David Benson-Pope. Prebble docked himself 2.5 percent of his own pay over the dismissal, after an inquiry found Prebble forgot to mention a conversation he had with Benson-Pope.

External image
- Photo of Mark Prebble by Andrew Gorrie/ Dominion Post

== Personal life ==
Prebble's first wife died in a blizzard on Aoraki / Mount Cook. He remarried, and has two sons and two daughters. His second wife, Lesley Bagnall, died in 2022.

== Honours ==
In the 2009 New Year Honours, Prebble was appointed a Companion of the New Zealand Order of Merit for public services.

| Preceded by Michael Wintringham | State Services Commissioner; 2004–30 June 2008 | Succeeded by Iain Rennie |
