= Richard Prebble =

New Zealand politician (born 1948)

The Honourable Richard Prebble CBE
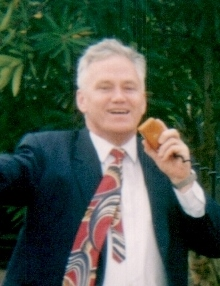
- Prebble in 1993

2nd Leader of ACT New Zealand
- In office 26 March 1996 – 13 June 2004
- Preceded by: Roger Douglas
- Succeeded by: Rodney Hide

28th Minister of Police
- In office 10 July 1990 – 2 November 1990
- Prime Minister: Geoffrey Palmer; Mike Moore
- Preceded by: Roger Douglas
- Succeeded by: John Banks

1st Minister for State Owned Enterprises
- In office 9 February 1990 – 2 November 1990
- Prime Minister: Geoffrey Palmer; Mike Moore
- Preceded by: Stan Rodger
- Succeeded by: Doug Kidd
- In office 1 August 1987 – 4 November 1988
- Prime Minister: David Lange
- Succeeded by: David Lange

14th Minister of Transport
- In office 26 July 1984 – 24 August 1987
- Prime Minister: David Lange
- Preceded by: George Gair
- Succeeded by: Bill Jeffries

Member of the New Zealand Parliament for Auckland Central
- In office 29 November 1975 – 6 November 1993
- Preceded by: Norman Douglas
- Succeeded by: Sandra Lee

Member of the New Zealand Parliament for Wellington Central
- In office 12 October 1996 – 27 November 1999
- Preceded by: Electorate re-created
- Succeeded by: Marian Hobbs

Personal details
- Born: 7 February 1948 (age 78) Kent, England
- Party: ACT New Zealand (1996 – 2004)
- Other political affiliations: Labour (until 1996)
- Relatives: Tom Prebble (brother); Mark Prebble (brother); Antonia Prebble (niece)

Richard William Prebble CBE (born 7 February 1948) is a former member of the New Zealand Parliament. Initially a member of the Labour Party, he joined the newly formed ACT New Zealand party under Roger Douglas in 1996, becoming its leader from 1996 to 2004.

== Early and personal life ==
Prebble was born in Kent, England, to Kenneth Ralph Prebble and Mary Prebble (née Hoad). In 1948, he moved with his parents and older brothers John and Tom Prebble when his father became vicar of Northcote parish in Auckland. His father was an Anglo-Catholic Anglican priest, and a leader in the Charismatic Renewal as archdeacon at St. Pauls, on retirement he and Mary were received into the Roman Catholic Church. He was educated at Auckland Grammar School before becoming a barrister and solicitor in 1971. From 1973 to 1974, he worked overseas in Fiji where he practised law.

Prebble's older brother, John Prebble KC, is an emeritus professor in law at Victoria University of Wellington. His younger brother, Mark Prebble was the State Services Commissioner and head of New Zealand's public service. John's daughter Antonia Prebble is an actor with a number of television roles.

Prebble has been married three times. His first wife was Nancy Cocks, and his second was Doreen Kuper, a former Honorary Consul for the Solomon Islands in New Zealand. His current wife is former Press Gallery radio journalist Ngahuia Wade. Cocks was a member of the Labour Party's Fijian branch; in 1975, she was elected to Labour's national executive.

== Member of Parliament ==
New Zealand Parliament
Years	Term	Electorate	List	Party
1975–1978	38th	Auckland Central		Labour
1978–1981	39th	Auckland Central		Labour
1981–1984	40th	Auckland Central		Labour
1984–1987	41st	Auckland Central		Labour
1987–1990	42nd	Auckland Central		Labour
1990–1993	43rd	Auckland Central		Labour
1996–1999	45th	Wellington Central	1	ACT
1999–2002	46th	List	1	ACT
2002–2005	47th	List	1	ACT

=== Opposition ===
Prebble was originally a member of the Labour Party and in 1965 he became chairman of the Auckland Central Electorate Committee. At the 1969 and 1972 elections he was a campaign organiser for Auckland Central MP Norman Douglas. When Douglas announced his retirement Prebble was selected, aged 27, to replace him as Labour's candidate in the seat. He was successful in being elected in the Auckland Central electorate at the 1975 election.

Soon after his election, owing mainly to Labour's drastic reduction in MPs in their 1975 defeat, he was made Labour's spokesman for race relations and the environment. Following the 1978 election, he was given the more prominent portfolio of justice by Labour leader Bill Rowling. From 1978 until 1980, he was additionally the Labour Party's junior whip. In 1979, Rowling decided to create a separate shadow cabinet above the caucus. Prebble was given a seat in the shadow cabinet, but was displeased at the change in portfolio allocations in which he lost justice and was instead given immigration, regional development and the environment. As a result, he refused to join the shadow cabinet to protest his allocation of portfolios he did not want. Colleagues described the move as petulant, with Prebble countering by saying "The difference in opposition to being in a shadow cabinet and being a backbencher is only in name. It's a shadow rather than a substance." He resigned as junior whip as well and returned to the backbench until March 1981 when he rejoined the shadow cabinet as Shadow Minister for Social Welfare and Pacific Island Affairs.

On 2 September 1983, Prebble was injured in a head-on car collision whilst he was returning to Wellington after addressing the Taxi Proprietors' Association conference. He was taken to Dannevirke Hospital and was treated for a concussion and broken pelvis.

Perhaps due to his legal background, Prebble became quickly known for his "tough, aggressive, non-compromising debating style." From 1975 to 1984, Labour was in opposition, and Ross Meurant recalled that "Sir Rob [Muldoon] has often said that when he was in government, the most irritating and damaging of his opponents was Richard Prebble. 'Always at it' said Sir Rob, 'Always a bother to us. Even if some thought he was mad the way he carried on, we never knew what he was going to come up with next.'"

=== Government ===
When the Fourth Labour Government was formed, after the 1984 election, Prebble was elected to the cabinet and was appointed Minister of Transport, Minister of Civil Aviation and Meteorological Services, Minister of Railways and Minister of Pacific Island Affairs. He pressed for a Pacific affairs ministerial portfolio to be established, having an interest in the experiences of Pacific Island New Zealanders due to his time working in Fiji and the large concentration of Pacific Islanders living in his Auckland Central constituency.

During the government Prebble aligned himself with Roger Douglas, the controversial Minister of Finance, and was an associate finance minister. Douglas, Prebble and David Caygill were together dubbed "the Treasury Troika", and were responsible for most of the economic reform undertaken by the Labour government. The "Rogernomics" reforms, which were based on free market economic theory, were unpopular with many traditional Labour supporters. In August 1988, Prebble spoke at a public meeting in Sydenham and was greeted with jeering crowds of Labour supporters who were angry with the reforms and their consequent unemployment. While being interviewed by a television reporter he was hit, mid-sentence, by an egg thrown from the crowd. The egg was thrown by Christopher Owen-Cooper, a former serviceman who served in both World War II and the Korean War, who faced a disorderly behaviour charge. Owen-Cooper was quoted by The Dominion newspaper as saying "We've all built up frustration, we're sick of what the Government's doing. They [politicians] can't give us any answers so it was time someone gave them the hurry along." He was discharged but paid $50 in costs.

Prebble held more portfolios than any other minister in the government as his post of Minister for State Owned Enterprises absorbed almost all the portfolios of government owned operations and assets which were scheduled to be privatised (much to the opposition of the public). As such, Prebble became grossly overworked and colleagues noticed he paid little attention to his appearance with unkempt hair and ragged suits. Other ministers also felt his portfolio took up too much time in cabinet meetings. Lange, in tune with the public mood, was opposed to public asset sales and impeded Prebble's efforts in selling them. The disagreement became a very public falling-out when Lange stripped him of the State Owned Enterprises (SOE) portfolio on 4 November 1988. Prebble publicly counterattacked in a television interview that night saying that Lange was acting dictatorially and was in no state to be making decisions. Prebble commented: "He [Lange] said the matter had been eating and gnawing at him and was killing him. I said I didn't think this was a proper basis for making policy. Mr Lange said in that case I should resign." The comments on television by Prebble led to his dismissal from cabinet altogether the following day. Lange stated at a press conference that Prebble had misrepresented the detail and nature of a private conversation between the two.

Prebble returned to the backbenches afterwards. In August 1989, he put himself forward to fill one of two vacant seats in cabinet, but lost a caucus ballot to Annette King. When Lange's replacement as Prime Minister Geoffrey Palmer held a complete re-election of cabinet in January 1990, Prebble was elected and returned to the frontbench and cabinet. Palmer gave him the SOE portfolio once again and later appointed him Minister of Police as well.

=== 1990 and 1993 elections ===
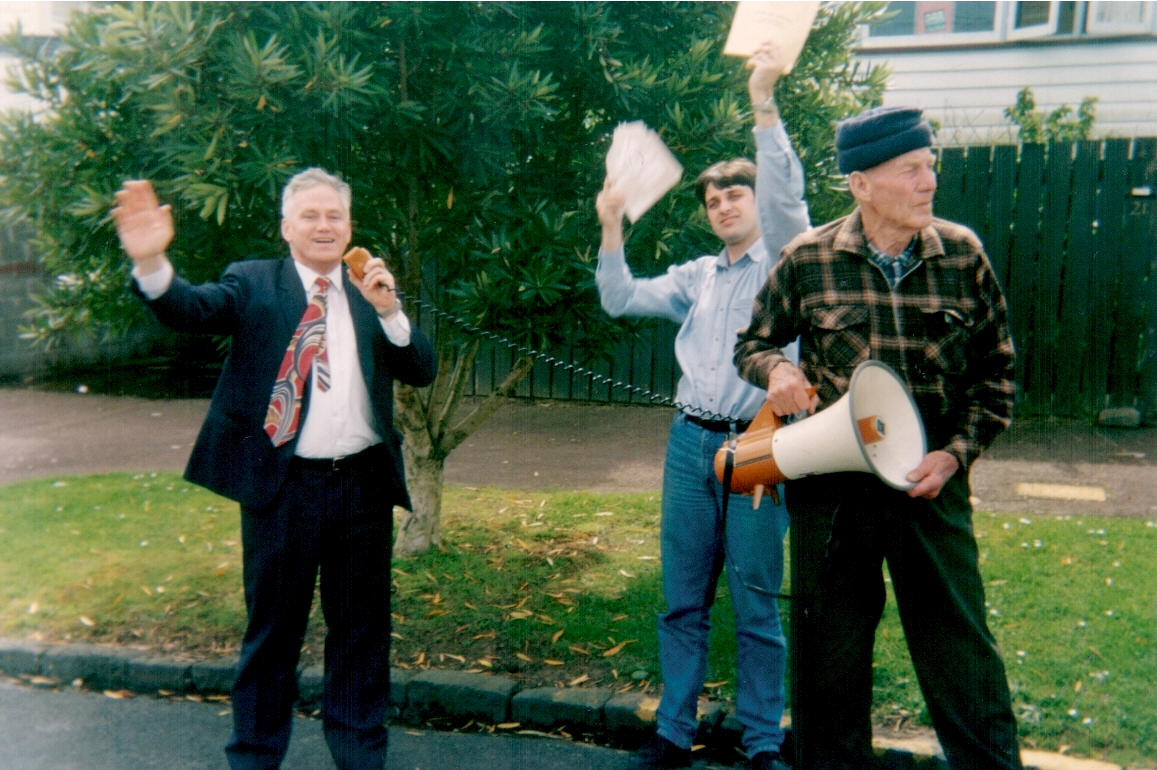
Prebble on the campaign trail in 1993

Prebble retained his Auckland Central seat in the 1990 election. In opposition he was appointed Shadow Minister of State Owned Enterprises, Works, Police and Pacific Island Affairs. In the 1993 election, Prebble lost his seat to Sandra Lee, deputy leader of the new left-wing Alliance party.

In the 1995 New Year Honours, Prebble was appointed a Commander of the Order of the British Empire, for public services.

After leaving parliament Prebble worked making consultancy deals and moved to Vietnam tendering to build New Zealand's first embassy there. In 1996 he also secured a joint-venture deal to restructure Vietnam's railway system (which was still using steam engines). He also joined Auckland businessman Malcolm McConnell to create the company McConnell International.

=== ACT New Zealand ===
New Zealand switched to the mixed-member proportional (MMP) representation electoral system in 1993. Roger Douglas established the ACT New Zealand party, and was joined by Prebble. Initially he did not take an active role in the party and, though frequently invited to speak at ACT functions, he stated in July 1995 that he had no intention of standing for parliament again. However, in March 1996, Douglas stepped down as the new party's leader, and Prebble took over beating former Federated Farmers president Owen Jennings for the party leadership.

==== 1996 election ====
In the 1996 election, the first to be held under MMP, ACT won eight seats in Parliament. Prebble won the Wellington Central electorate following a campaign that saw National Party leader and Prime Minister Jim Bolger predict Prebble would win rather than National’s candidate. Under New Zealand's MMP rules, a party that falls below the five-percent threshold can still qualify for MMP if it wins at least one electorate seat. Bolger saw ACT as a natural partner either in a coalition or a confidence-and-supply arrangement (a marked turn from Prebble and Douglas's roots in Labour), and wanted to ensure ACT would be in the chamber by helping Prebble win Wellington Central. The events were captured in the documentary Campaign. In the end, ACT won 6.1 percent of the party vote, enough for it to enter Parliament in any event.

==== 1999 election ====
Prebble lost his Wellington Central seat in the 1999 election, but remained in Parliament as a list MP and leader of ACT.

==== 2002 election ====
Prebble was re-elected as a list MP and leader of ACT in the 2002 election.

== Retirement ==
=== ACT party activism ===
Prebble was replaced as ACT leader by Rodney Hide in 2004, and did not stand in the 2005 election.

He became campaign manager for ACT leading up to the 2014 election with his stated aim to bring 9 ACT MP's into Parliament; this did not eventuate however as ACT did not gain any new seats, only retaining Epsom.

=== Waitangi Tribunal, 2024–2025 ===
In late October 2024, the Sixth National Government appointed Prebble to the Waitangi Tribunal. Labour Member of Parliament Willie Jackson opposed Prebble's appointment, citing his alignment with the ACT Party's policies towards Māori including the controversial Treaty Principles Bill. In early March 2025, Prebble resigned from the Tribunal, citing disagreements with their interpretation of the Treaty of Waitangi, particularly the narrative that Māori people never ceded sovereignty to the New Zealand Crown.

== Personal life ==
Prebble now lives in Rotorua and he is a columnist with The New Zealand Herald.

== Publications ==
- Values not politics: ACT New Zealand campaign manifesto: general election 1996, Auckland, [N.Z.]: ACT New Zealand, 1996, ISBN 0-477-01901-3
- Values not politics: the first 1000 days, Wellington, [N.Z.]: ACT New Zealand Parliamentary Office, 2000, ISBN 0-477-01901-3
- ACT Members of Parliament. (2001), Closing the gaps: policy papers, Wellington, [N.Z.]: ACT New Zealand Parliamentary Office, ISBN 0-9582178-1-5
- Prebble's contribution was the paper: "New Zealand: tenth by 2010."
- from ACT Members of Parliament. (2002), Old values: new ideas, Wellington, [N.Z.]: ACT New Zealand Parliamentary Office, ISBN 0-477-01964-1
- Prebble's contribution was the paper: "Old values, new ideas."
- Prebble, Richard (1983), Labour's views on Transport Amendment Bill (no. 5) and future transport policy, n.p.: n.p.
- Prebble, Richard (1987), Muldoon vs. Bolger, Wellington, [N.Z.]: R. Prebble
- Prebble, Richard (1996), I've been thinking, Auckland, [N.Z.]: Seaview Publishing, ISBN 1-86958-170-9
  - The second edition of this book is entitled Now it's time to act.
- Prebble, Richard (1997), What happens next, Auckland, [N.Z.]: Seascape Press, ISBN 0-473-04859-0
- Prebble, Richard (1999), I've been writing, Wellington, [N.Z.]: Fraser Holland Publishers, ISBN 0-473-06031-0
- Prebble, Richard (2006), Now it's time to act, Auckland,[N.Z.]: Seaview Press, ISBN 1-86958-170-9
  - This is the second edition of I've been thinking - containing additional material.
- Prebble, Richard (2006), Out of the red, Rotorua, [N.Z.]: The Letter Ltd., ISBN 0-473-11249-3
- Prebble, Richard; Bassett, Michael; Harris, Peter (1978), Environment, energy, forestry: Labour's 1978 manifesto, Wellington, [N.Z.]: Labour
- Prebble, Richard (1987), National's promises, promises, promises-- : or, how to buy an election with other people's money: or, the world's longest political suicide note, Wellington, [N.Z.]: N.Z. Labour Party
- Prebble, Richard (2003), Liberal thinking, Wellington, [N.Z.]: ACT New Zealand Parliamentary Office, ISBN 0-477-01979-X
- Prebble's contributions are the papers: "Why I do not vote National"; and (co-authored with Deborah Coddington) "Lessons of freedom and choice."

== Notes ==
New Zealand Parliament
Preceded by Norman Douglas	Member of Parliament for Auckland Central; 1975–1993	Succeeded by Sandra Lee
Vacant Constituency abolished in 1993 Title last held by Chris Laidlaw	Member of Parliament for Wellington Central; 1996–1999	Succeeded by Marian Hobbs
Political offices
Preceded by Roger Douglas	Minister of Police; 1990	Succeeded by John Banks
New title	Minister for State Owned Enterprises; 1984–1988 1990	Succeeded by David Lange
Preceded by Stan Rodger	Minister for State Owned Enterprises; 1984–1988 1990	Succeeded by Doug Kidd
Preceded by George Gair	Minister of Railways; 1984–1988 1990	Succeeded by David Lange
Preceded by Stan Rodger	Minister of Railways; 1984–1988 1990	Succeeded by Doug Kidd
Preceded by Jonathan Hunt	Postmaster-General; 1987–1988	Succeeded by David Butcher
Preceded by George Gair	Minister of Transport; 1984–1987	Succeeded by Bill Jeffries
Party political offices
Preceded by Roger Douglas	Leader of ACT New Zealand; 1996–2004	Succeeded by Rodney Hide
