= Airini =

Airini is a given name. Notable people with the given name include:

- Airini A'Court (born 1953), New Zealand painter
- Airini Beautrais (born 1982), New Zealand poet and short-story writer
- Airini Donnelly (c. 1855 – 1909), New Zealand tribal leader, lawyer, and landowner
- Airini Grennell (1910–1988), New Zealand singer, pianist, and broadcaster
- Airini Woodhouse (1896–1989), New Zealand author and historian
