= Henry Lang (public servant) =

New Zealand economist and public servant (1919–1997)

Henry Lang ONZ CB
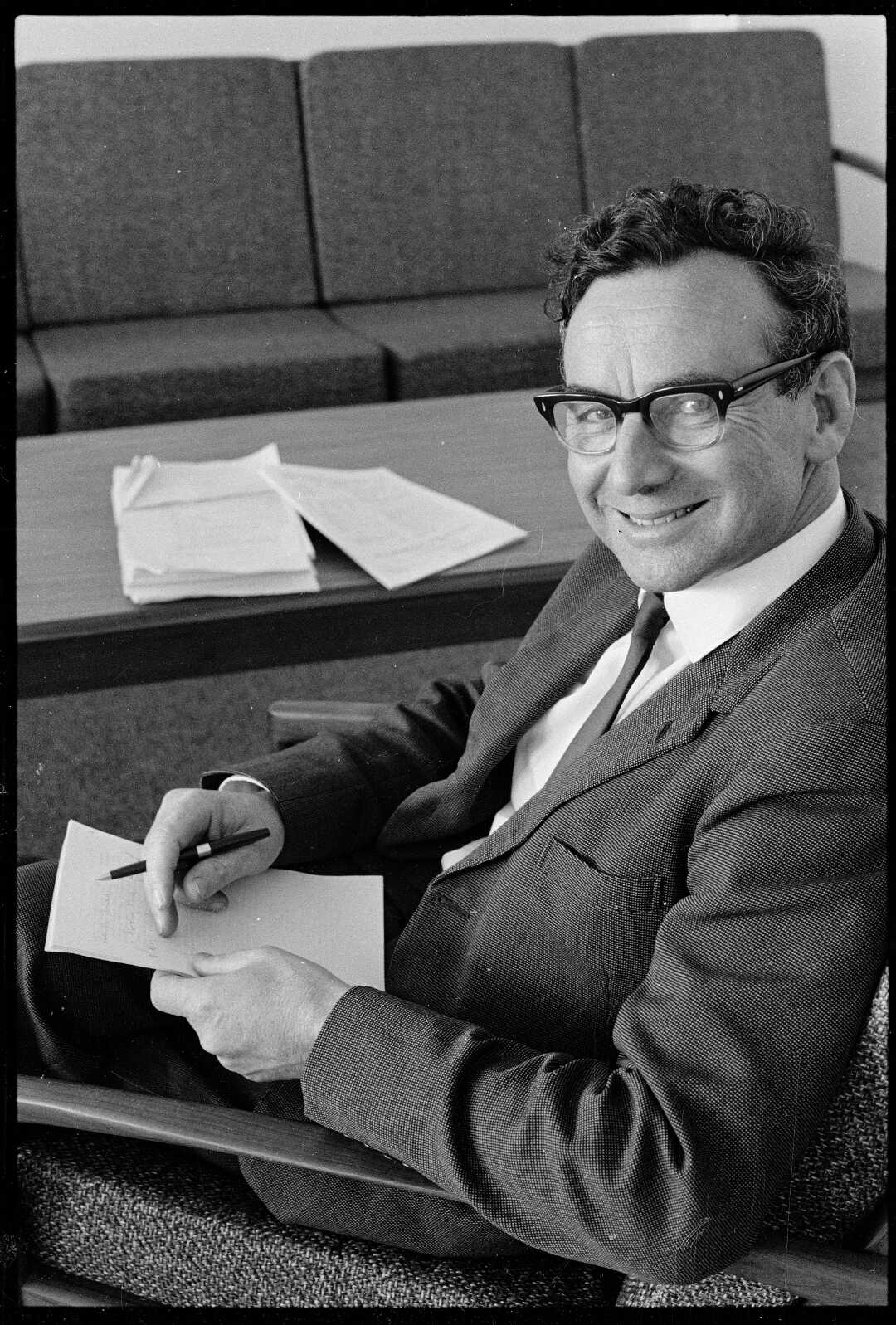
- Lang in 1968

Secretary to the Treasury
- In office 1968–1977
- Preceded by: Noel Davis
- Succeeded by: Noel Lough

Personal details
- Born: Heinrich Lang; 3 March 1919 Vienna, Austria
- Died: 17 April 1997 (aged 78) Wellington, New Zealand
- Citizenship: New Zealand
- Relatives: Anna Plischke (mother); Ernst Plischke (stepfather)

Henry George Lang ONZ CB (3 March 1919 – 17 April 1997) was a New Zealand public servant, economist, university professor and company director. He was born in Vienna, Austria, on 3 March 1919 and later became the stepson of the architect Ernst Plischke.

== Early years ==
Lang was born Heinrich Lang, in 1919 in Vienna, to Anna Schwitzer, a landscape designer, and Robert Lang a hardware manufacturer. His parents later divorced, and in 1935, Anna Schwitzer remarried, marrying architect Ernest Plischke.

In 1937, he enrolled in the Akademisches Gymnasium in Vienna, and had completed a year of mandatory military service in the Austrian military.

Lang fled Austria as a refugee, together with his mother and step-father in 1939, after his mother came under threat of the German occupation of Austria due to her Jewish heritage. Lang's father, Robert Lang was detained in a concentration camp for a time.

Lang's family arrived in New Zealand in May 1939, and settled in Wellington. Lang changed his name to Henry George Lang.

Lang's first job was in a prune packing facility in Petone, where he later became foreman. He then started working at Warner Brothers Pictures, holding multiple positions (including bookkeeper, accountant and acting secretary) while he pursuing a degree in commerce at Victoria University College. He complete his degree in 1945.

He enlisted in the Royal New Zealand Air Force in 1944, where he worked as a field mechanic. He was discharged from the air force in 1946. He continued his university studies while he served, and graduated with a BA in philosophy in 1947.

Lang was naturalised as a New Zealand citizen in November 1945.

== Public service career ==
In 1946, following his discharge from the air force, Lang joined the investigative staff of the New Zealand Economic Stabilisation Commission. He worked with senior policymakers, including Bernard Ashwin—who served as a mentor and role model—as well as with many emerging officials with whom he would collaborate throughout his career. This experience helped shape the pragmatic Keynesian approach for which he became known in New Zealand public policy.

In 1949 to 1950, he returned to academia, studying public administration in the Victoria University College on a Public Service Commission grant.

In 1951, Lang joined the New Zealand Treasury, where he was promoted to senior research officer in 1954. He was seconded to the Department of External Affairs in 1955. He became the economic counsellor in the New Zealand High Commission in London where he served until 1958. He then returned to New Zealand, becoming the Treasury's chief research officer. He soon proceeded to rise up the ranks, becoming an assistant secretary in 1963, deputy secretary in 1966, and finally being appointed as Secretary of the Treasury on 20 December 1968.

Lang served as Secretary of the Treasury from 1968 to 1977, serving under three ministers of finance – Robert Muldoon, Wallace (Bill) Rowling, and Robert Tizard. Lang's tenure was a turbulent time for the New Zealand economy, with the most notable event being the 1973 oil crisis, while heavily impacted New Zealand as a country with no significant native oil or gas resources.

Lang took an early retirement in January 1977. The Prime Minister at the time, Muldoon, stated that "he was the best Secretary to the Treasury he had ever known."

== Later career ==
Following his official retirement from public service, Lang took on the post of a visiting professor of economics at Victoria University of Wellington until 1982. Lang took part in the establishment and consolidation of the Institute of Policy Studies at Victoria University in 1983.

In 1983, Lang founded the Wellington Sculpture Trust together with Dr. Ian Prior, where Lang served as chairman.

Lang served on multiple company boards, among them New Zealand Forest Products, Challenge Finance and National Australia Bank (NZ). He also served as the chair of the Government Life Insurance Corporation (later to be known as the Tower Corporation). Additionally, Lang served as a member of the New Zealand Press Council and on the board of the Museum of New Zealand Te Papa Tongarewa.

Lang’s retirement did not mark the end of his public service involvement. Lang took interest in health economics and chaired government reviews of cardiac surgery and the health workforce. In 1979, he was a consultant for a publication for the New Zealand Planning Council on social policy. He advised the government on setting up the Economic Summit Conference of 1984. In 1989, he was involved in a review of the prime minister’s advisory staff.

== Accolades and legacy ==
In the 1977 New Year Honours, Lang was appointed a Companion of the Order of the Bath, in recognition of his service as Secretary to the Treasury since 1969.

In 1984, he received an honorary LLD from Victoria University.

In 1989, Lang became an inaugural member of the Order of New Zealand.

In his honor, the Wellington Sculpture Trust commissioned a group of sculptures called "Kaiwhakatere: the Navigator", located near the Parliament and Treasury buildings in Wellington.

== Personal life ==
Lang married Octavia Gwendolin (Tup) Turton in 12 December 1942. He fathered four daughters and one son.

Lang was an avid tramper and skier.

In 1996, one of Lang's daughters, Frances Lang, died in an air crash in Peru on her honeymoon.

He died in Wellington, New Zealand, on 17 April 1997, survived by his wife and four children.

Government offices
Preceded by Noel Davis	Secretary to the Treasury; 1968–1977	Succeeded by Noel Lough
