= Ian Ball (accountant) =

New Zealand accountant

- Born: Ian Ball; August 24, 1948; New Zealand
- Education: Victoria University of Wellington and University of Birmingham, U.K.
- Known for: Architect of the New Zealand Government’s financial management reform and launch of the first modern public sector balance sheet and initiator of International Public Sector Accounting Standards
- Scientific career
- Fields: Academia, public service and professional accounting institutions
- Workplaces: New Zealand Treasury, International Federation of Accountants and Victoria University of Wellington

Ian Ball is a professor of Practice - Public Financial Management at the School of Accounting and Commercial Law at Victoria University Wellington, New Zealand. He served as the Director of Financial Management Policy and Central Financial Controller at the New Zealand Treasury from 1987 through 1994. He is credited with being the architect of the design and implementation of New Zealand's financial management reform process, leading to the passage of the Public Finance Act of 1989. This made New Zealand the first country to introduce modern accounting and integrate its balance sheet with the budget, as a tool for its budgeting, appropriations, and financial reporting. This public sector balance sheet was used to avoid a double down-grade to the Sovereign credit rating, under the stewardship of the then Minister of Finance Ruth Richardson.

== Career ==
Ian Ball has a degree in accounting from Victoria University of Wellington and a PhD from the University of Birmingham, England. From 1994 through to 2002 he was Professor of Accounting and Public Policy at Victoria University of Wellington. From 1995 to 2000 he was the Chairman of the International Federation of Accountants (IFAC) Public Sector Committee, where he initiated and led the development of International Public Sector Accounting Standards, now the International Public Sector Accounting Standards Board (IPSASB). Between 2002 and 2013 he served as the chief executive officer of IFAC. Since 2013 he is the Chair of the Chartered Institute of Public Finance and Accountancy (CIPFA). Ball serves as the Independent Chair of New Zealand Treasury's Financial Statements of the Government Audit Committee. The Committee provides advice and observations to the Secretary to the Treasury relating to key issues and risks that affect the production and audit of the Financial Statements of the Government (FSG).

== Publications ==
- Public Finance International: PFM: the good, the bad and the ugly, May 23, 2016
- Financial Times: Lessons from New Zealand on fiscal discipline, October 11, 2017
- Public Finance International: Balance sheets and fiscal policy: the New Zealand example, October 11, 2018
- Public Finance International: Steering the fiscal ship, October 5, 2018
- Reuters-BreakingViews: Building better bridges, October 18, 2018
- Public Net Worth : Accounting, Government and Democracy, London: Palgrave MacMillan, 2024, ISBN 978-3-031-44342-8
