= Alex Jurshevski =

Alex Jurshevski is a Canadian international finance professional, of Russian descent who has become a prominent commentator in Iceland on the 2008–2012 Icelandic financial crisis.

He has a company - Recovery Partners - and has previously worked in various financial roles. These include the following: managing director of the Bankers Trust; working with the Investment Banking Division at Nomura; serving on the European Management Committee at NIplc; acting as Chair of the Emerging Markets Trading Committee; and his most important claim is to have been head of portfolio management operations for the New Zealand government in the New Zealand Debt Management Office (NZDMO). He has also been a member of the Advisory Panel on Government Debt Management and the World Bank's Government Borrowers Forum.
