= 1981 New Year Honours (New Zealand) =

Annual awards for New Zealanders

The 1981 New Year Honours in New Zealand were appointments by Elizabeth II on the advice of the New Zealand government to various orders and honours to reward and highlight good works by New Zealanders. The awards celebrated the passing of 1980 and the beginning of 1981, and were announced on 31 December 1980.

The recipients of honours are displayed here as they were styled before their new honour.

== Knight Bachelor ==
- Charles Hilgendorf CMG JP – of Ashburton. For public services, especially as chairman of the New Zealand Meat Producers Board.
- Austin George Wilson OBE – of Auckland. For services to commerce and the community.

== Order of the Bath ==
=== Companion (CB) ===
Military division

- Air Vice Marshal David Ewan Jamieson OBE – of Wellington; Royal New Zealand Air Force.

== Order of Saint Michael and Saint George ==
=== Companion (CMG) ===
- John Clarke – of Clinton; chairman, New Zealand Wool Board, 1972–80.
- The Honourable Richard Geoffrey Gerard – of Rakaia. For public services.
- Noel Vernon Lough – of Eastbourne; secretary to the Treasury, 1977–80.
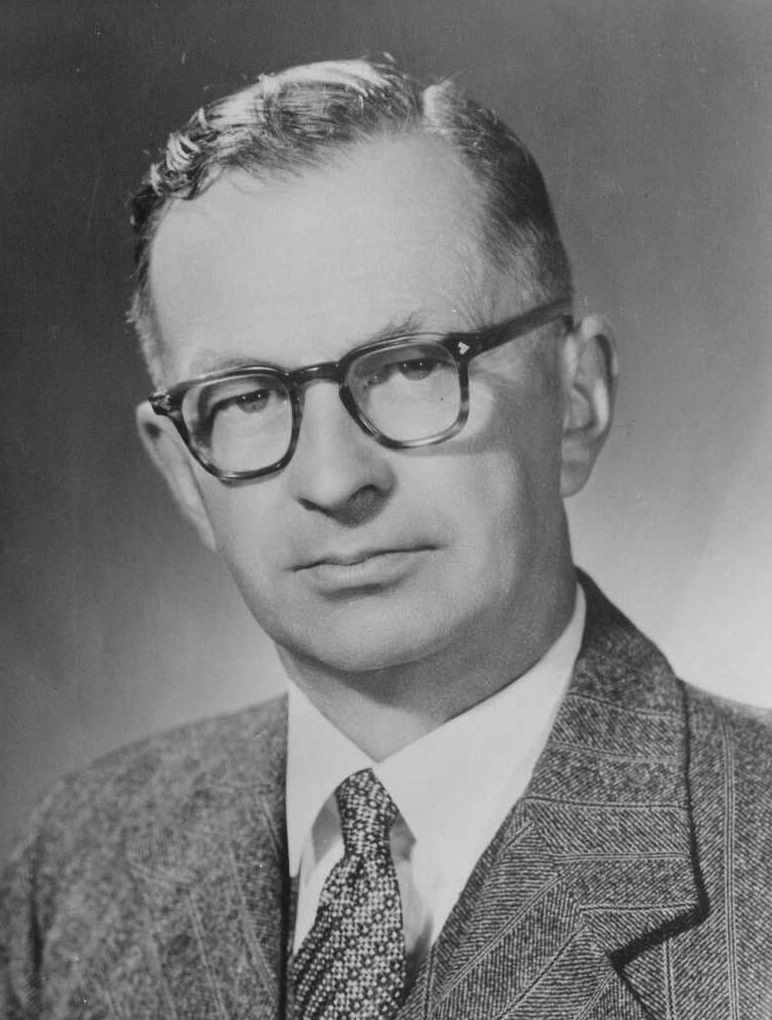
Geoff Gerard

== Order of the British Empire ==
=== Dame Commander (DBE) ===
Civil division

- Whina Cooper CBE JP – of Auckland. For services to the Māori people.
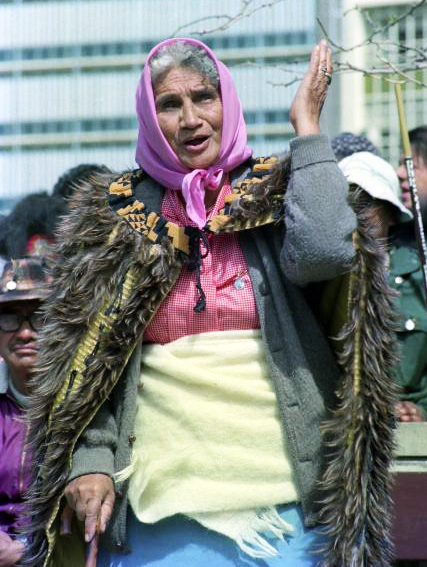
Dame Whina Cooper

=== Knight Commander (KBE) ===
Civil division

- Dr The Honourable Thomas Robert Alexander Harries Davis – of Rarotonga; premier of the Cook Islands. For services to medicine and the people of the Cook Islands.
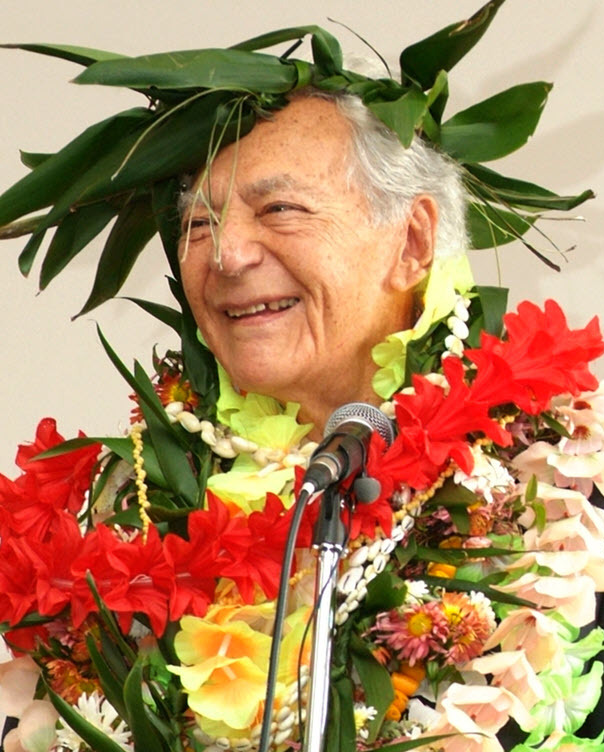
Sir Tom Davis

=== Commander (CBE) ===
Civil division

- James Warne Ardagh OBE – of Christchurch. For services to medicine.
- Doreen Vera Blumhardt – of Wellington. For services to art, especially pottery.
- Francis Rei Paul Hamon – of Thames. For services to art.
- Mary Wilhelmina Margaret Lythgoe – of Waikanae. For services to nursing.
- Arthur William Baden Powell – of Auckland. For services to marine science.
- Dr Edwin Ian Robertson OBE – of Tawa; director-general, Department of Scientific and Industrial Research, 1971–80.
- Dr Frank William Eden Rutter – of Auckland. For services as chairman, Auckland Hospital Board.

Military division

- Air Commodore Ian Murray Gillard OBE AFC – of Wellington; Royal New Zealand Air Force.
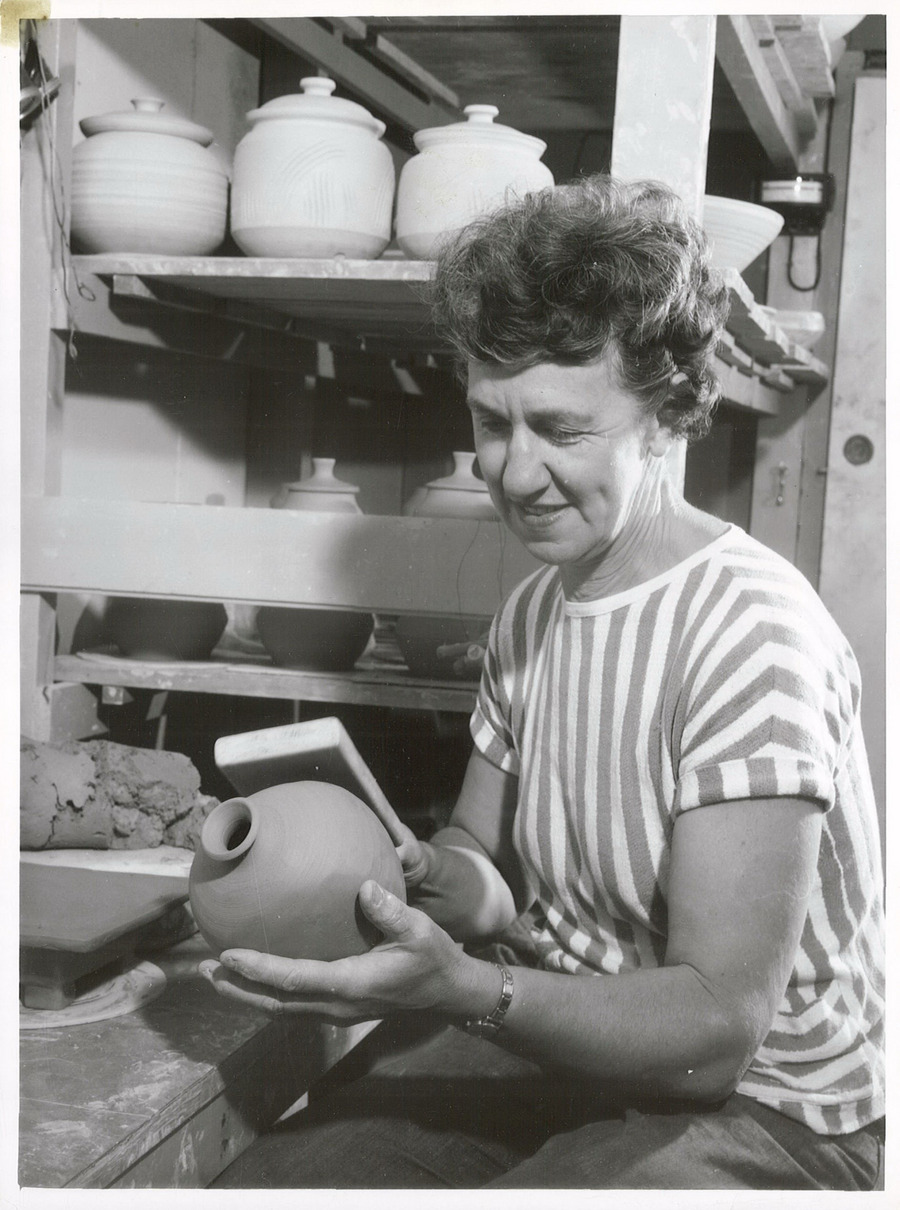
Doreen Blumhardt

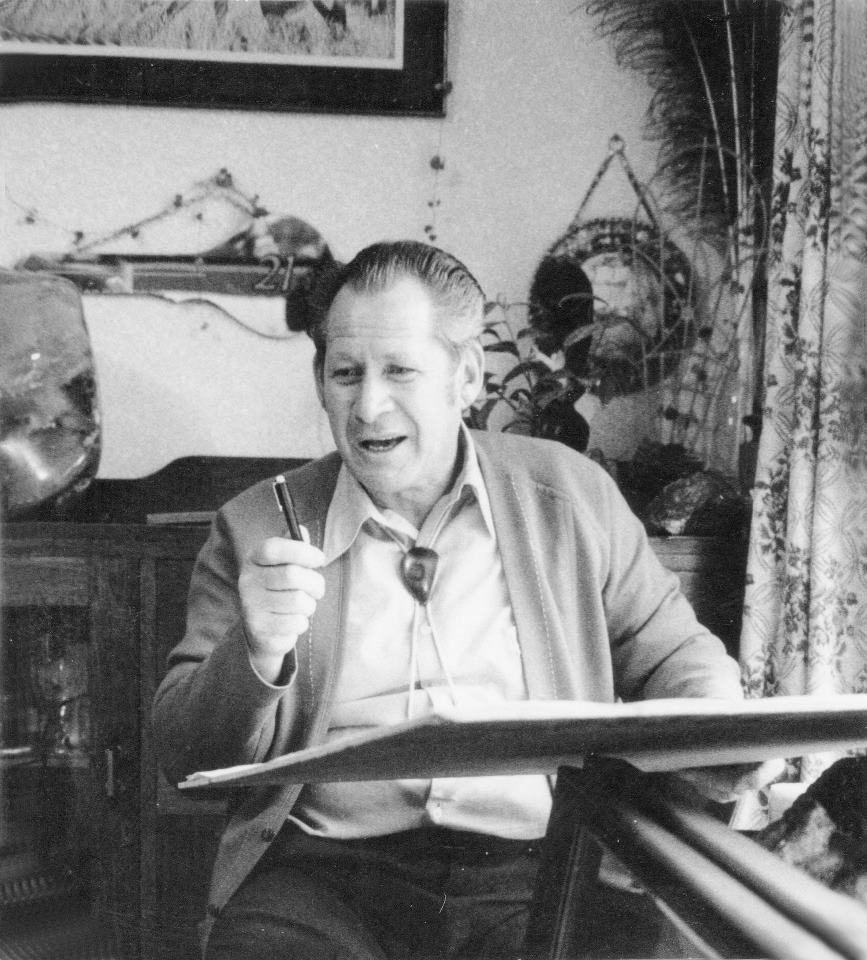
Rei Hamon

=== Officer (OBE) ===
Civil division

- Harry Herbert Ayres – of Christchurch. For services to mountaineering.
- Leo George Wellington Carrington – of Stratford. For services to local and community affairs.
- George Cooper Cruickshank – of Invercargill. For services to the sport of trotting.
- Murray Charles Day – of Hamilton. For services to squash.
- Bernard Lancelot Ebbett – of Palmerston North. For services to the dairy industry.
- Stuart Carlton Hay – of Auckland. For services to the community.
- Hamish Henry Cordy Keith – of Auckland; chairman, Queen Elizabeth II Arts Council.
- Nevile Sidney Lodge – of Wellington. For services as a cartoonist.
- Donald Mitchell McKenzie – of Auckland. For services to physiotherapy and the blind.
- Lloyd Morgan – of Paraparaumu. For services to Lions Clubs International.
- Walcott Eyre Wilder Ormond – of Havelock North. For services to Thoroughbred breeding.
- John Wellesley Evan Raine – of Wellington. For services to medicine.
- Desmond Bruce Smith – of Christchurch. For services to cycling.
- William John Watt – of Auckland. For services to anaesthetics and the community.
- Iona Williams JP – of Dunedin. For services to the community.
- Ray Roberts Wilson – of Auckland. For services to music.

Military division

- Captain Alexander David Nelson – of Lower Hutt; Royal New Zealand Navy.
- Colonel Donald Stuart McIver – of Papakura; Colonels' List, New Zealand Army.
- Wing Commander Te Waaka Hemi Morete – of Lower Hutt; Royal New Zealand Air Force.
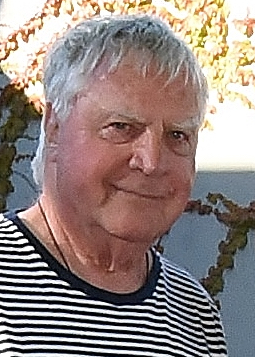
Hamish Keith

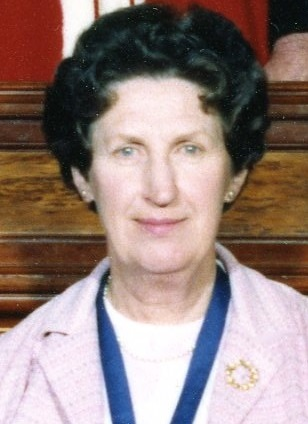
Iona Williams

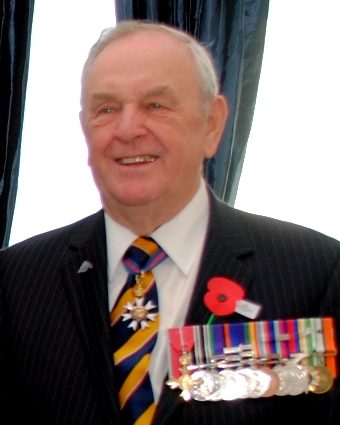
Don McIver

=== Member (MBE) ===
Civil division

- Maude Louisa Ashley – of Christchurch. For services to the community.
- Eric Douglas Baynton – of Auckland. For services to returned servicemen.
- Maurice Reginald Billows – of Bluff. For services to local and community affairs.
- Colin Brenton-Rule – of Auckland. For services to the community.
- John Cunningham Chalmers – of Auckland. For services to education.
- Wadier Assid Corban – of Auckland. For services to the viticultural industry.
- John Middleton Garrett – of Auckland. For services to ex-prisoners of war.
- Olga Estelle Harding – of Wellington. For services to drama and education.
- Clarence Alfred Healey – of Wanganui. For services to rowing.
- Richard Bower Heathcote JP – of Morrinsville. For services to local and community affairs.
- Reginald Ernest Hermans MC – of Hamilton. For services to engineering.
- Francis Jellyman – of Cobden. For services to rugby league.
- Temporary Squadron Leader George Alfred Kay – of Wellington; No. 18 Avon Squadron, New Zealand Air Training Corps.
- Ashley Robert Lewis JP – of Lower Hutt; controller of programme services, Television New Zealand.
- Lawrence Hamilton McClelland – of Christchurch; Registrar-General of Land, 1967–80.
- Rita McEwan – of Paremata; lately principal nurse, Porirua Hospital.
- Ian Crawford McGregor – of Tauranga; lately deputy general manager, New Zealand Railways.
- The Reverend Francis George McKean – of Pōkeno. For services in Tonga, New Hebrides, Papua New Guinea and Solomon Islands.
- Robert Stronach Mitchell – of Tawa; inspector, New Zealand Police.
- James Morgan – of Auckland; chief inspector, New Zealand Police.
- Dr James Graham Power – of Thames. For services to medicine and the community.
- Richard John Rassie – of Auckland. For services to sport, especially table tennis.
- Francis John Stanton – of Christchurch; mountaineer. For services to the DC10 recovery operation, Antarctica, November–December 1979.
- Catherine Edith Cydie Strang – of New Plymouth. For services to the theatre.
- Hemi Wiremu – of London, England. For services to New Zealand interests in the United Kingdom.

Military division

- Warrant Officer Yeoman of Signals Wiremu Nepia Bartlett – of Auckland; Royal New Zealand Navy.
- Lieutenant Commander George Ross Gibson VRD – of Christchurch; Royal New Zealand Naval Volunteer Reserve.
- Warrant Officer Leigh George Morley BEM – of Auckland; Royal New Zealand Navy.
- Warrant Officer Ordnance Artificer Geoffrey John Ockleston – of Auckland; Royal New Zealand Navy.
- Warrant Officer Class I Robert George Blankley – of Wellington; Royal New Zealand Artillery.
- Warrant Officer First Class Edward William Bruce – of Singapore; Corps of Royal New Zealand Engineers.
- Warrant Officer Class II Michael David Flattery-Donohoe – of Waiouru; Corps of Royal New Zealand Signals.
- Warrant Officer Barry Ruthven Thurston (H77793) – of Feilding; Royal New Zealand Air Force.

== British Empire Medal (BEM) ==
Military division

- Chief Petty Officer Radio Supervisor Gary James Johnston – of Auckland; Royal New Zealand Navy.
- Petty Officer Electrician David Thomas Lilley – of Auckland; Royal New Zealand Navy.
- Sergeant David Ward Chambers – of Papakura; Royal New Zealand Electrical and Mechanical Engineers.
- Sergeant Robert John McCloughen – of Wellington; Royal New Zealand Infantry Regiment.
- Staff Sergeant Paul Herbert Robinson – of Waiouru; Royal New Zealand Corps of Transport.
- Flight Sergeant Desmond John Lyall – of Whenuapai; Royal New Zealand Air Force.
- General Service Hand Ronald Sidney Mead MM – of Auckland; Royal New Zealand Air Force.
- Flight Sergeant Thomas Richard Statham – of Bulls; Royal New Zealand Air Force.

== Companion of the Queen's Service Order (QSO) ==
=== For community service ===
- Dr Joseph Richard Dawson ED – of Christchurch.
- Kathleen Muriel Evans – of Blenheim.
- Norman Thomas Veech Gusscott – of Lower Hutt.
- Kathleen Mullins – of Waiatarua.
- Henry Russell Rice JP – of Auckland.
- Anne Margaret West – of Kaitaia.

=== For public services ===
- Wilfred James Allingham – of Auckland.
- Dr Henry Rongomau Bennett – of Te Awamutu; medical superintendent, Tokanui Hospital, since 1964.
- Dr Graham Bruce Alistair Cowie – of Masterton.
- Charles George Cran JP – of Christchurch.
- Dr Richard Kenneth Dell – of Wellington; director, National Museum, 1966–80; president of the Royal Society of New Zealand.
- Stewart Hector James Duff JP – of Wellington.
- Arthur Gordon Spratt JP – of Te Puke.
- Daniel Lindsay Studholme – of Eketāhuna.
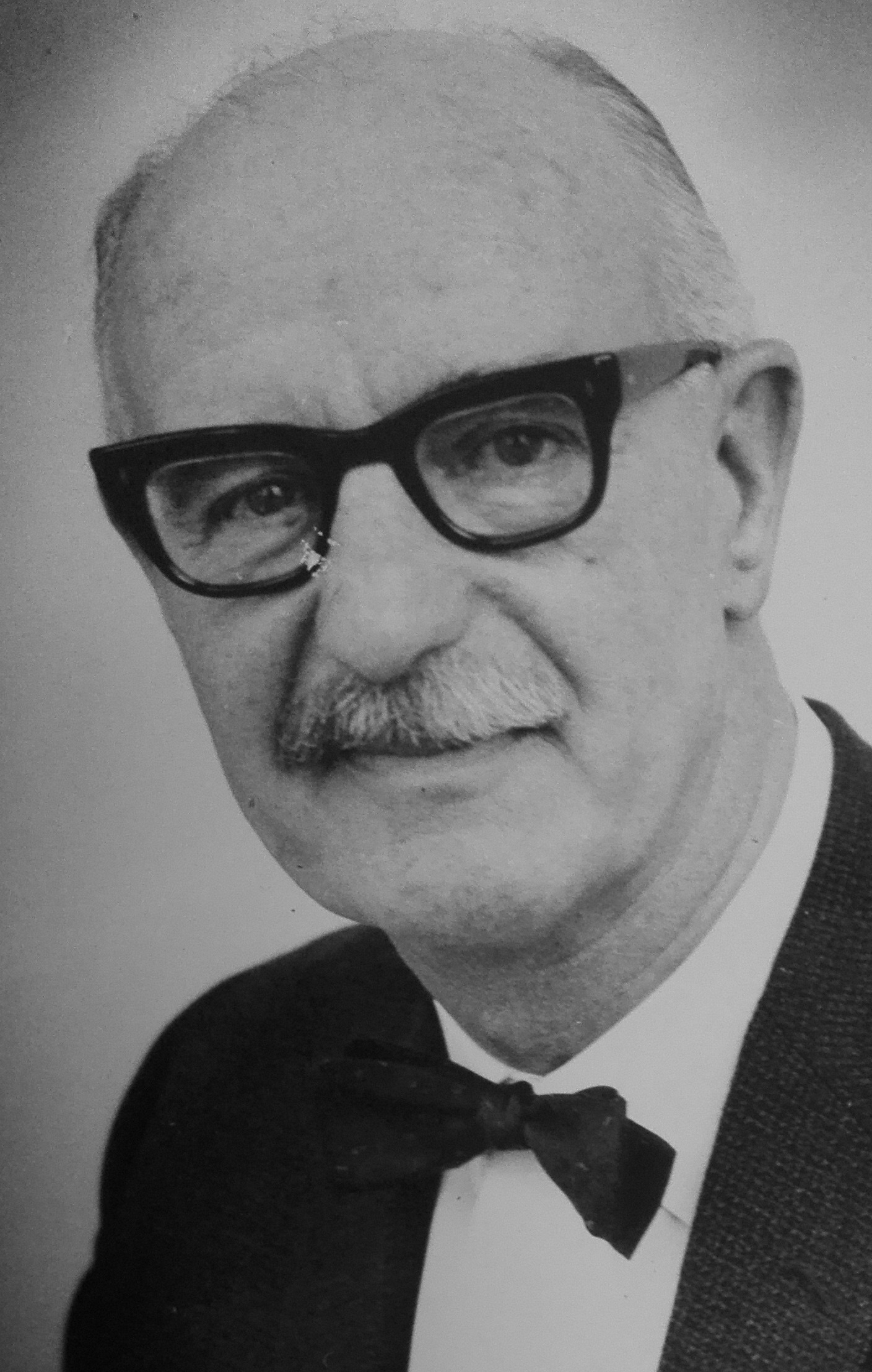
Stewart Duff

== Queen's Service Medal ==
=== For community service ===
- Frederick John Stanley Adam – of Wellington.
- Oleen Winifred Madge Adrian – of Dannevirke.
- Bartholomew Michael Dennehy – of Napier.
- Noel Edwin Gordon Dick – of Eketāhuna.
- Hester Loughrey Gentles – of Christchurch.
- Ernest Moreland Groube – of Whangārei.
- William Hastings Jones – of Balclutha.
- Agnes Gwendolene King – of Richmond.
- Amrita Norma Large – of Auckland.
- Marjory Mahala Lill – of Auckland.
- Rosalie Hazel Lill – of Auckland.
- Williamina Margaret McHardy – of Napier.
- Dorothy Helen Meadows – of Hikurangi.
- Mary Loma Lois Metherell – of Hamilton.
- Isobel Brunton Mills – of Tapanui.
- Martha Edna Moon – of Kaikohe.
- Ronald Dalmore Munro – of Timaru.
- Charles Edward Pethybridge – of Motueka.
- Leonard Harry Sigglekow – of Takapuna.
- Mary Eileen Orella Smith – of Auckland.
- Dorothy Waititi – of Cape Runaway.
- Airini Elizabeth Woodhouse – of Timaru.
- Constance Ethel Wright – of Christchurch.

=== For public services ===
- George Witika Brown – of Te Karaka.
- Harold Mark Vincent Burgess – of Wellington; detective senior sergeant, New Zealand Police.
- Christina Kelly Davey – of Palmerston North.
- Frederick Denbee – of Carterton.
- Geoffrey Neville Dyer JP – of Tokoroa.
- Alice Marjorie Fieldhouse – of Wellington.
- Dr Thomas Michael Francis Fitzgerald – of Hāwera.
- David Stewart Goulding JP – of Christchurch.
- Trevor William Hick JP – of Silverdale.
- Alan Purdy Jesson JP – of Rotorua.
- Ian Henderson Johnson – of Lower Hutt; lately teacher, Taita College.
- Allan George Lather – of Whangārei.
- Daphne Irene Lawrence – of Lower Hutt.
- Margaret Jean Leaf JP – of Auckland.
- Ada Lucy Lee – of Christchurch.
- Gordon Buckingham McGeorge JP – of Rakaia.
- Henry James Martin JP – of Wainuiomata.
- Colin Harry Stuart Miller JP – of Upper Hutt.
- Frederick Sidney Phillips JP – of Gisborne.
- Albert Pomeroy – of Invercargill.
- Ronald Maxwell Stewart – of Invercargill.
- Gilbert Richard Yeoman ED – of Whakatāne.

== Queen's Fire Service Medal (QFSM) ==
- Colin James Flanagan – divisional officer, Dunedin Fire Brigade.
- George Raymond Heaven – chief fire officer, Wellsford Volunteer Fire Brigade.
- Peter Henry Thompson – chief fire officer, Hokitika Volunteer Fire Brigade.

== Queen's Police Medal (QPM) ==
- Kenneth Owen Thompson MVO – of Wellington; deputy commissioner, New Zealand Police.

== Air Force Cross (AFC) ==
- Master Helicopter Crewman Ivan William Toothill – of Christchurch; Royal New Zealand Air Force.
