= Margaret Clark (political scientist) =

New Zealand political scientist (1941–2026)

Dame Margaret Clark DNZM CMG JP
- Born: Margaret Florence Clark; 28 January 1941; Wellington, New Zealand
- Died: 11 September 2026 (aged 85); Wellington, New Zealand
- Education: Columbia University
- Spouses: William R. Roff (div. 1977); Bernie Galvin (m. 1980; died 2010)
- Relatives: Michael Galvin (stepson); David Clark (brother)
- Scientific career
- Fields: Political science
- Workplaces: Victoria University of Wellington
- Thesis: Political charge in east Malaysia, 1962–1972: organisation, mobilisation, and incorporation (1973)
- Website: Staff page at VUW

Dame Margaret Florence Clark (28 January 1941 – 11 September 2026), known for a time by her married name of Margaret Clark Roff, was a New Zealand political science academic. She was the first New Zealand woman to be made a professor in political science and an emeritus professor of politics at Victoria University of Wellington.

== Background and education ==
Born in Wellington on 28 January 1941, Clark was educated at Wellington East Girls' College. She went on to study at Wellington Teachers' Training College and Victoria University College, completing a Bachelor of Arts in politics at the latter institution in 1960. After winning a Rotary Foundation Fellowship, she undertook further study at the University of Malaya in Kuala Lumpur from 1962 to 1963, graduating Master of Arts in 1964, and later doctoral studies at Columbia University in New York City from 1969 to 1972, gaining a PhD. Her doctoral thesis was titled Political charge in east Malaysia, 1962–1972: organisation, mobilisation, and incorporation.

Clark was married to historian William R. Roff until they divorced in 1977. On 21 April 1980 in Wellington, Clark married Bernie Galvin, who served as secretary to the treasury from 1980 to 1986, and she became stepmother to his four children including Michael Galvin. Galvin died in 2010. Clark died at a retirement village in the Wellington suburb of Kilbirnie on 11 September 2026, at the age of 85.

== Career ==
After completing her MA, Clark lectured at the University of Melbourne for two years, and then at the University of Malaya for three years. She taught at the City University of New York from 1972 to 1975 following the completion of her PhD. Clark then returned to New Zealand, and was appointed a senior lecturer in politics at Victoria University of Wellington. She was promoted to professor in 1978, the first woman in New Zealand to be made a professor in political science, and served as the dean of commerce and administration between 1980 and 1982.

From 1980 to 1985, Clark served as a human rights commissioner. She was conferred with the title of professor emeritus by Victoria University in 2010.

== Honours and awards ==
In the 1993 New Year Honours, Clark was appointed a Companion of the Order of St Michael and St George, for services to education. She was appointed a Distinguished Companion of the New Zealand Order of Merit, also for services to education, in the 2007 New Year Honours. Following the restoration of titular honours by the New Zealand government in 2009, she accepted redesignation as a Dame Companion of the New Zealand Order of Merit.

In 2012, the Margaret Clark Prize for Victoria University of Wellington honours politics students was established in her name.

== Selected publications ==
- Clark, M, Other Worlds In Clark, M (ed), Beyond Expectations: fourteen New Zealand women write about their lives (Allen & Unwin, 1986).
- Clark, M (ed), Keith Holyoake: Towards a Political Biography (Wellington: Dunmore Press, 1997).
- Clark, M (ed), Peter Fraser: Master Politician (Wellington: Dunmore Press, 1998.)
- Clark, M (ed), Three Labour Leaders: Nordmeyer, Kirk and Rowling (Wellington: Dunmore Press, 2001).
- Clark, M (ed), Holyoake's Lieutenants (Wellington: Dunmore Press, 2003).
- Clark, M (ed), Muldoon Revisited (Wellington: Dunmore Press, 2004).
- Clark, M (ed), Lange and the Fourth Labour Government (Wellington: Dunmore Press, 2006).
- Clark, M (ed), The Bolger Years: 1990–2007 (Wellington: Dunmore Press, 2008) ISBN 9781877399336
