= Noel Lough =

New Zealand economist (1920–2011)

Noel Lough CMG

Secretary to the Treasury
- In office 1977–1980
- Preceded by: Henry Lang
- Succeeded by: Bernie Galvin

Personal details
- Born: Noel Vernon Lough; 11 December 1920 Auckland, New Zealand
- Died: 7 February 2011 (aged 90) Wellington, New Zealand
- Spouse: Joan Margaret Evans (m. 1946; died 2009)
- Children: 4
- Education: Victoria University of Wellington
- Occupation: Public servant; economist

Military service
- Branch/service: New Zealand Army; Royal New Zealand Air Force
- Rank: Flying officer

Noel Vernon Lough CMG (11 December 1920 – 7 February 2011) was a New Zealand economist and public servant who served as Secretary to the Treasury from 1977 to 1980. During his tenure, he oversaw the establishment of the internal "Economics II" division, which laid the intellectual foundation for the Rogernomics of the mid-1980s.

== Early life ==
Lough was born in the Auckland suburb of Devonport on 11 December 1920, the son of Ethel Jane (née Ivil) and Vernon Edward Lough. He was educated at Auckland Grammar School, Christchurch Boys' High School and Hutt Valley High School. He joined the New Zealand Treasury as a cadet in 1936, and studied accounting part-time.

Duing World War II, Lough saw military service, first in the New Zealand Army from 1941 to 1943, and then in the Royal New Zealand Air Force from 1943 to 1945, attaining the rank of flying officer. He was transferred to the Reserve of Air Force Officers in December 1945.

Lough became engaged to Joan Margaret Evans in October 1944. The couple married at St James's Church, Lower Hutt, on 18 May 1946; they went on to have four children, including business executive and company director Phil Lough (born 1947) who was appointed a Companion of the New Zealand Order of Merit in 2008.

== Career ==
Following the war, Lough served on the Economic Stabilisation Commission for period, before returning to the economics division of the Treasury in 1948. He also completed his studies in accountancy and economics at Victoria University College, graduating with a Bachelor of Commerce degree in 1949.

Between 1956 and 1959, Lough was seconded to the Department of External Affairs, initially as head of the department's economics division, and later attached to the New Zealand embassy in Washington, D.C. After returning to the Treasury in Wellington, he was appointed assistant chief research officer of the economics division in 1959 and director of the economics division in 1963. In 1965, he became assistant secretary of the Treasury, and was promoted to deputy secretary in 1969. In the latter roles, he represented New Zealand on delegations to the World Bank and the International Monetary Fund. He also served on the Wool Commission, the Wool Marketing Commission, and the Apple and Pear Prices Authority.

During his career at the Treasury, Lough was involved in developing New Zealand's trade policy, advocating for increased exposure to international competition. He played a central role in formulating economic strategies in response to the United Kingdom's entry into the European Economic Community and supported economic integration with Australia. He took a lead role in negotiating the 1965 New Zealand Australia Free Trade Agreement, which reduced tariffs across Trans-Tasman trade.

From 1973 to 1974, Lough served as president of the New Zealand Association of Economists.

=== Secretary to the Treasury (1977–1980) ===
Lough succeeded Henry Lang as Secretary to the Treasury in 1977. His tenure coincided with severe macroeconomic pressures, including the 1970s oil shocks, high inflation, and balance-of-payments deficits. In response, Lough reoriented the department beyond traditional accounting and vote-control functions toward long-term structural policy analysis.

==== Institutional reforms and policy advice ====
To support strategic analysis, Lough established a new internal division within the department named "Economics II" and recruited university-trained economists into senior roles, including Graham Scott, who later became Secretary in 1986. The division examined structural constraints on growth, analyzed the long-term impact of import licensing, price controls, and industrial subsidies, and evaluated market liberalisation strategies. Under Lough, analysts in Economics II, including future Treasury leaders Scott and Murray Horn, developed microeconomic models that later provided the theoretical framework for the "Rogernomics" reforms under the Fourth Labour Government in the mid-1980s.

Lough's tenure coincided with the administration of Prime Minister Robert Muldoon, who favored direct economic intervention. Treasury frequently opposed Muldoon's approach, advocating instead for structural liberalisation, market pricing, and expenditure restraint. Following the 1979 oil shock, Treasury advised Cabinet against the large-scale "Think Big" industrial and energy projects, warning of excessive debt exposure and uncertain financial returns.

Lough advocated for economic liberalisation, deregulation, and greater exposure to international competition. Following the 1970s oil shocks, he presented a growth package to Prime Minister Robert Muldoon in 1978 that proposed opening the economy to foreign competition. Muldoon rejected the core proposals due to his protectionist stance. Colleagues and economists later stated that adopting Lough's measures at the time could have reduced the severity of the structural reforms in the mid-1980s.

==== CER trade negotiations ====
As Secretary, Lough chaired the Officials' Economic Committee (OEC), which coordinated economic policy across government agencies. In this role, he led the team of officials that designed the framework for the Closer Economic Relations (CER) trade agreement with Australia.

To overcome static negotiations under the 1965 New Zealand Australia Free Trade Agreement (NAFTA), the OEC proposed a negative-list model where all goods were included in trade liberalisation by default, with exemptions strictly limited to a temporary "deferred list." Despite political caution from Cabinet, the OEC maintained progress on the agreement through joint analytical studies on phased structural adjustments, such as removing import licensing. Lough managed interdepartmental coordination in Wellington during initial talks in 1978–1979 and represented New Zealand in discussions with senior Australian officials, including Geoffrey Yeend and Neil Currie.

==== External roles and retirement ====
Upon the establishment of the New Zealand Planning Council in 1977, Lough was appointed an ex officio member as Secretary to the Treasury.

Lough retired from the Treasury upon reaching the compulsory retirement age of 60 in December 1980, and was succeeded by Bernie Galvin.

=== Later work ===
Following his retirement, Lough became a director of a number of public companies, including Regal Salmon, Cable Price Downer and Westpac. He also chaired the Dairy Prices Authority and the New Zealand board of Colonial Mutual Life.

In early 1990, the government appointed Lough to chair a committee to review the implementation of the "Tomorrow's Schools" education reforms. The committee's report, Today's Schools: A review of the education reform implementation process, and commonly known as the Lough Report, was publicly released in May that year.

== Death ==
Lough died in Wellington on 7 February 2011, at the age of 90, having been predeceased by his wife, Joan Lough, in 2009. His funeral was held at Old St Paul's, Wellington.

== Honours and awards ==
In 1977, Lough received the Queen Elizabeth II Silver Jubilee Medal. In the 1981 New Year Honours, he was appointed a Companion of the Order of St Michael and St George (CMG), in recognition of his public service as Secretary to the Treasury.

Government offices
Preceded by Henry Lang	Secretary to the Treasury; 1977–1980	Succeeded by Bernie Galvin
