= 1956 Birthday Honours (New Zealand) =

Award list for New Zealand

The 1956 Queen's Birthday Honours in New Zealand, celebrating the official birthday of Elizabeth II, were appointments made by the Queen on the advice of the New Zealand government to various orders and honours to reward and highlight good works by New Zealanders. They were announced on 31 May 1956.

The recipients of honours are displayed here as they were styled before their new honour.

== Knight Bachelor ==
- Robert Lachlan Macalister – mayor of the City of Wellington.
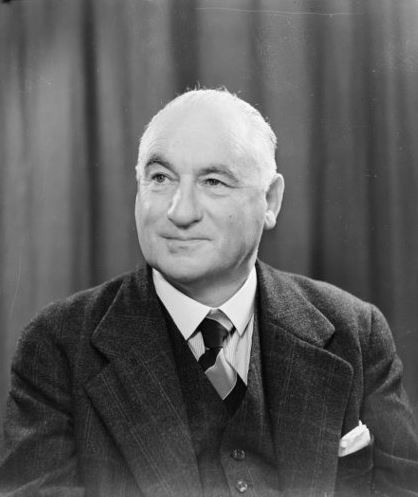
Sir Robert Macalister

== Order of Saint Michael and Saint George ==
=== Companion (CMG) ===
- Clarence Edward Beeby – Director of Education.
- Edward George Sayers MC FRCP – a prominent physician, of Auckland. For public services.
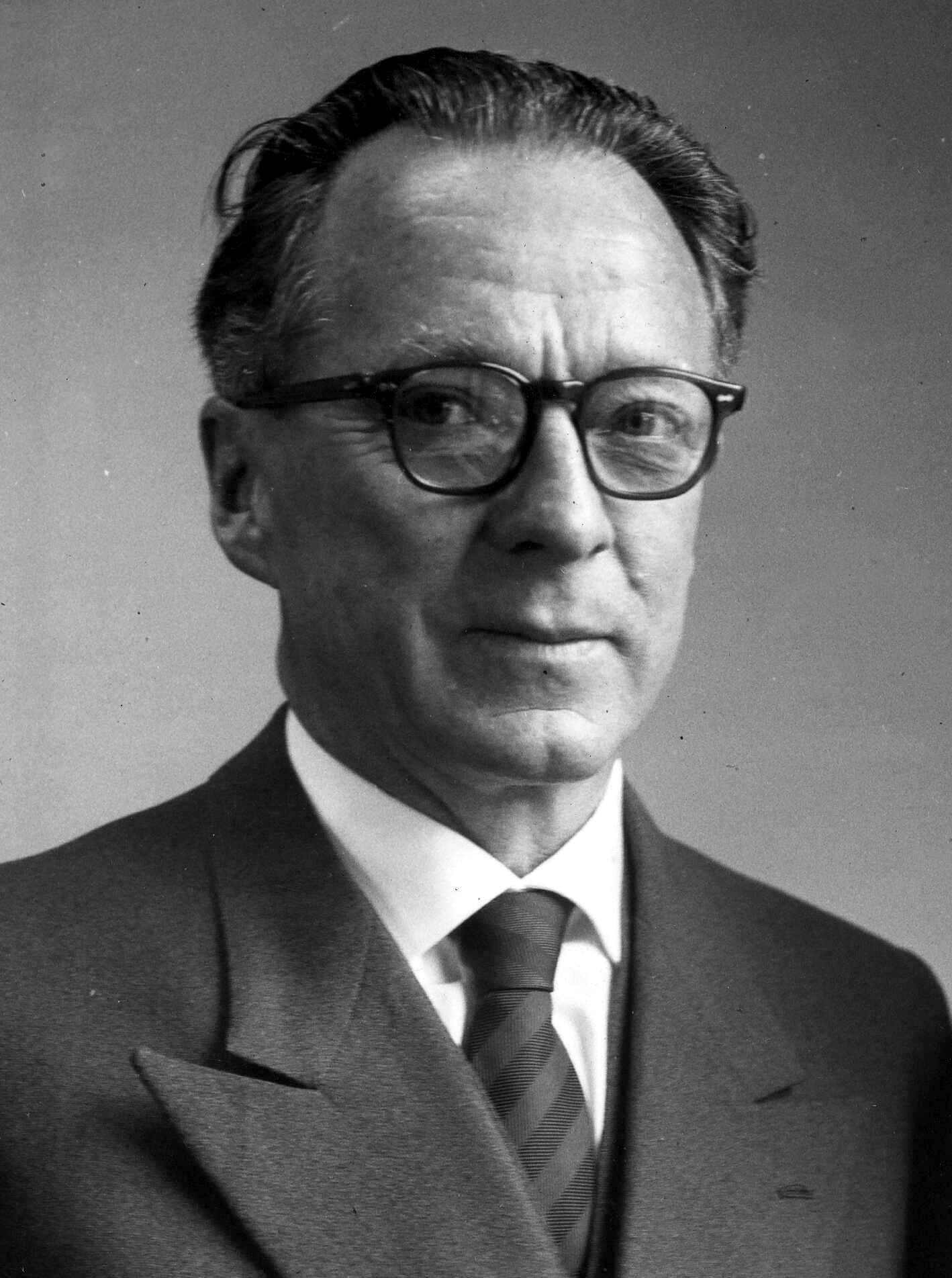
C. E. Beeby

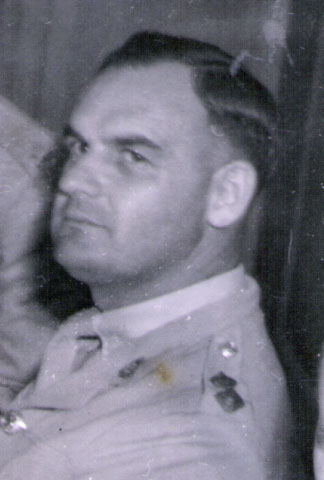
Edward Sayers

== Order of the British Empire ==
=== Knight Commander (KBE) ===
Civil division

- Bernard Carl Ashwin CMG – formerly Secretary to the Treasury.
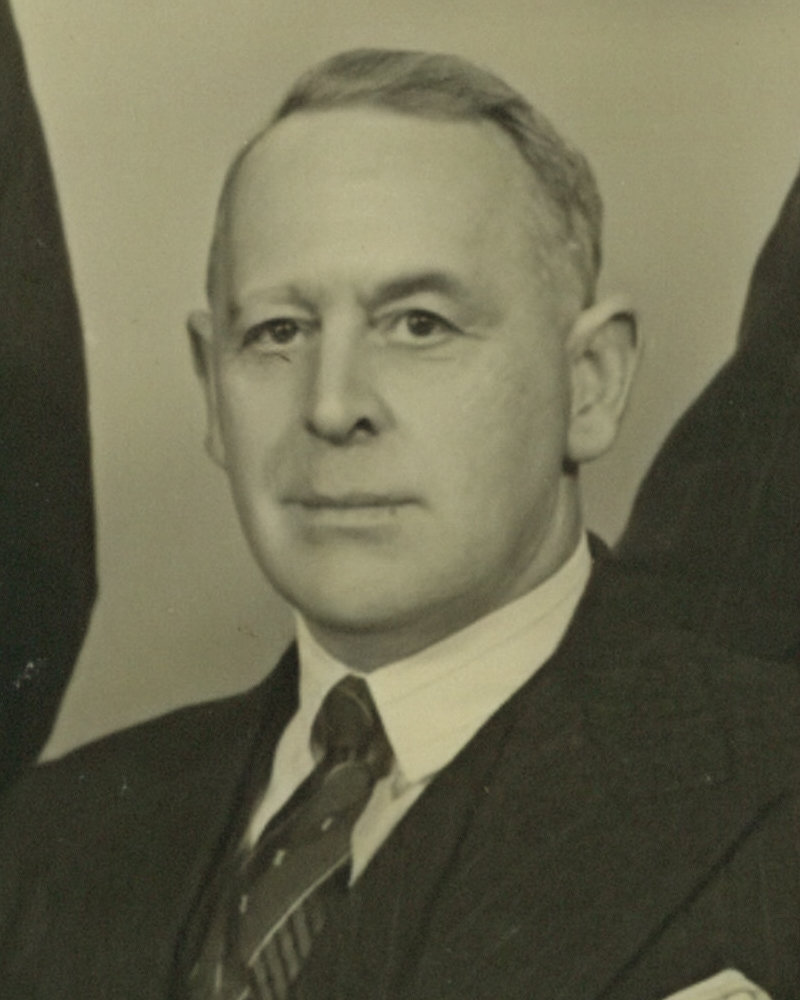
Sir Bernard Ashwin

=== Commander (CBE) ===
Civil division

- Arnold Fielder Downer – engineer in charge of various public works.
- James Peter Speid Jamieson MD – of Nelson; a prominent medical practitioner.
- The Honourable Makea Nui Teremoana Ariki – a member of the Legislative Council of the Cook Islands.
- Arnold Wall – professor emeritus, Canterbury University College. For services to education.

Military division

- Captain John George Nicholson Hilliard DSC VRD – Royal New Zealand Naval Volunteer Reserve.
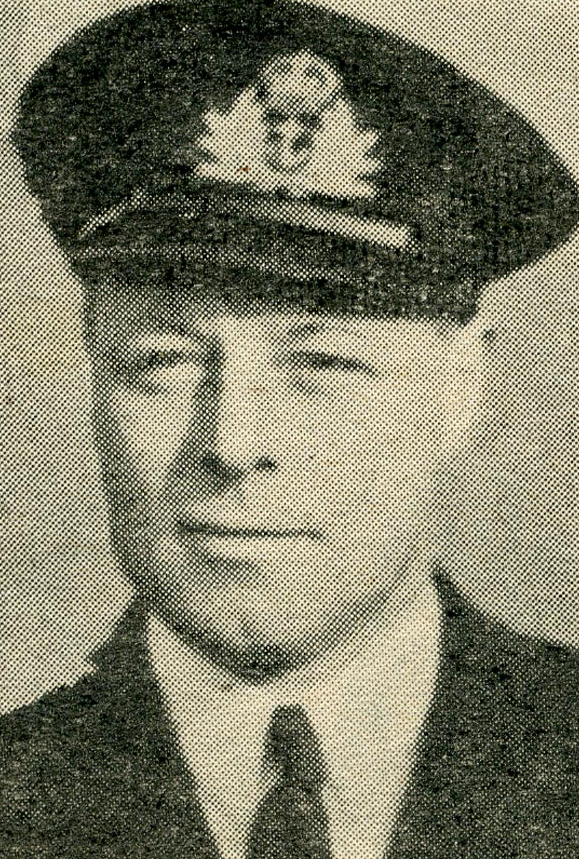
Jack Hilliard

=== Officer (OBE) ===
Civil division

- Ernest Cook Bathurst JP – mayor of Ashburton since 1944.
- Winifred Delugar – matron-in-chief, Auckland Hospital Boards' Institution.
- Douglas Ralph Auckland Eden – general manager, New Zealand Reparation Estates, Western Samoa.
- William Grieve – chairman of the Southland Centennial Association (Inc.).
- Albert Victor Hartley – of Invercargill. For services to the farming community of New Zealand, especially in Southland.
- Albert John Orchard MB CM – a medical practitioner in Christchurch for over 50 years.
- Basil Otto Peterson. For services to the City of Wellington, especially as town clerk.
- Hugh Thomas Speight – of Dunedin. For social welfare services, especially to the Crippled Children's Society.
- Clement George Trotter. For services to the Farmers' Co-operative Organisation Society and other bodies.

Military division

- Lieutenant-Colonel Paul Wilfred Robertshaw MC ED – Royal New Zealand Infantry Corps (Territorial Force).
- Lieutenant-Colonel Harold Geoffrey Wooller – Royal New Zealand Armoured Corps (Regular Force).
- Wing Commander William Dale Abernethy – Royal New Zealand Air Force.

=== Member (MBE) ===
Civil division

- Harold Iver Austad – chairman of the management committee, New Zealand Amateur Athletic Association, for many years.
- Marian Eva Baxter – matron of the Rhodes Convalescent Home, Cashmere Hills, Christchurch.
- Henry Reginald Billing – chairman of the New Plymouth High School Board for many years.
- Cora Louisa Burrell – of Christchurch. For social welfare services.
- Arthur Hellyer Collins – chairman of the Wanganui County Council.
- Viva Donaldson JP – of Whangārei. For public services.
- Peter Graham – of Franz Josef Glacier; a mountaineer and alpine guide.
- Sydney Jefcoate Harbutt – of Auckland. For services to various local and public organisations.
- Vera Annie Hayward – of Dunedin. For services rendered in connection with educational and women's organisations.
- Robert Telford Kinaston – of Roxburgh. For services to the farming community.
- Charles Gordon Macauley. For services rendered in connection with the tourist movement in Southland.
- Margaret Emma Magill JP – of Eastbourne. For social welfare services.
- Bridget Ellen Moran (Sister Mary St Athanasius) – of the Māori Girls' College, Greenmeadows, Hastings.
- Mary Anne Reidy – of Kawhia. For services to nursing.
- Robert John Smith – president of the Bush Rugby Football Union for many years.
- Arthur William Taff – of Napier; an inventor and manufacturer of appliances for disabled persons.
- James Frederick Thompson – president of the Greytown Chamber of Commerce.
- Charles Morgan Williams – of Kaiapoi. For public services.

Military division

- First Officer Lorelle Henderson Corbin – Women's Royal New Zealand Naval Service.
- Captain Frederic Rex Bartley – Royal New Zealand Artillery (Regular Force).
- Major Robert Maynard Gurr – New Zealand Regiment (Regular Force).
- Major Robert Bruce Reed ED – Royal New Zealand Infantry Corps (Territorial Force).
- Major John William Rolleston – Royal New Zealand Armoured Corps (Territorial Force).
- Flight Lieutenant Peter Harry Lumley – Royal New Zealand Air Force.
- Warrant Officer John Niven – Royal New Zealand Air Force.
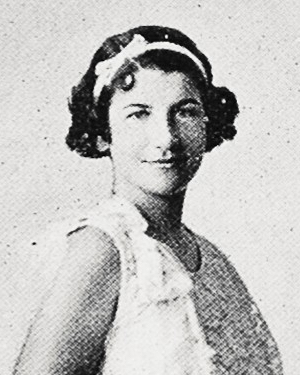
Lorelle Corbin

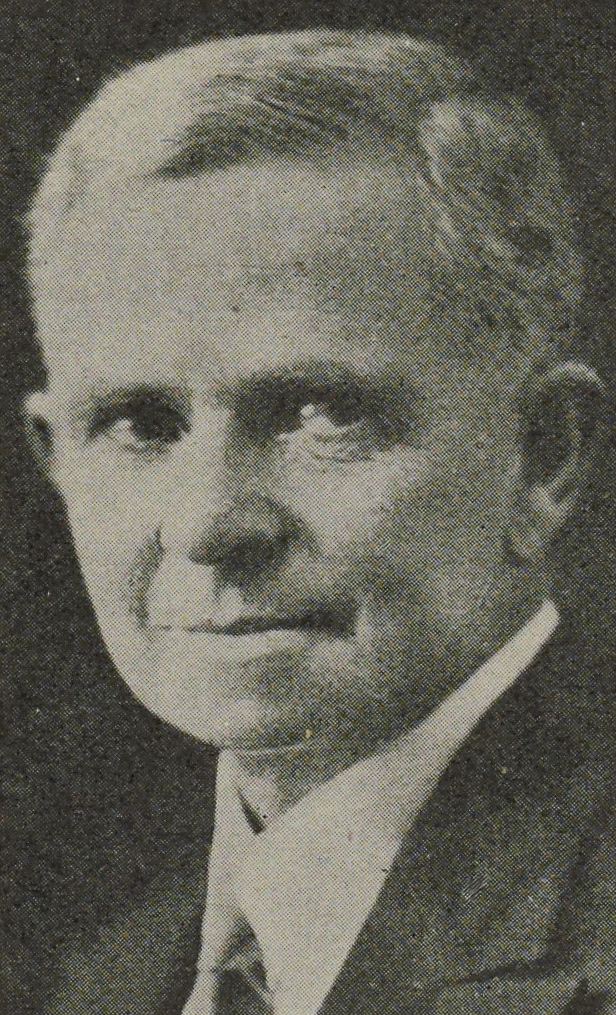
J. F. Thompson

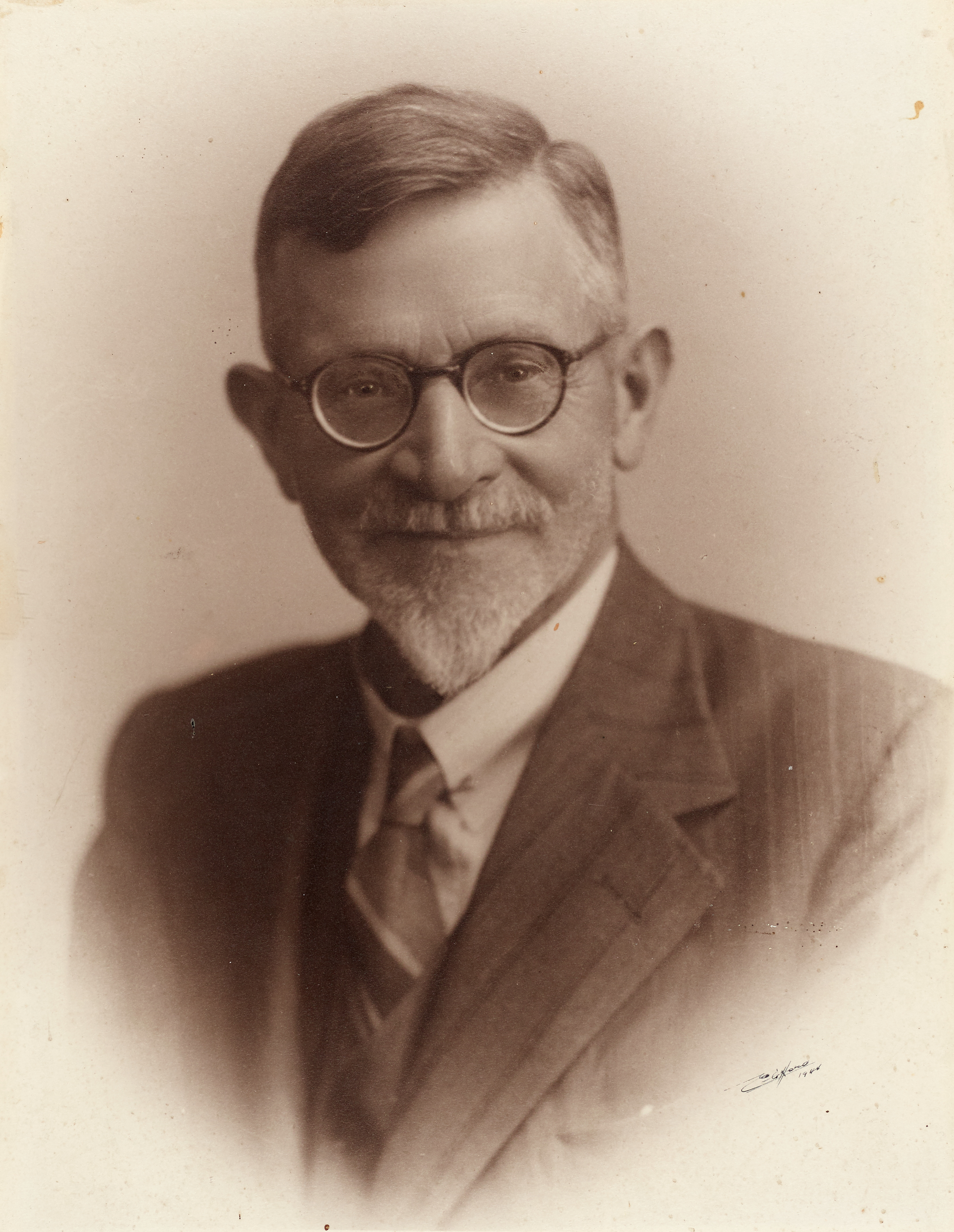
Morgan Williams

== Companion of the Imperial Service Order (ISO) ==
- Francis Bernard Dwyer – Army Secretary.
- George Ernest Francis Wood OBE – government statistician.

== British Empire Medal (BEM) ==
Civil division

- Thomas James Cotter – constable, New Zealand Police Force, Putāruru.
- Theodore Royden Heighway – station officer, Auckland Metropolitan Fire Brigade.

Military division

- Chief Petty Officer Writer William Douglas Dinmore – Royal New Zealand Navy.
- Chief Engineering Mechanic Ernest Benjamin Gascoigne – Royal New Zealand Navy.
- Chief Electrician Robert Brian Harvey – Royal New Zealand Navy.
- Ordnance Artificer 1st Class Charles Hepburn – Royal New Zealand Navy.
- Stores Chief Petty Officer Richard Allan Jefferies – Royal New Zealand Navy.
- Staff-Sergeant Dorothy Kendall Baxter – New Zealand Women's Royal Army Corps (Regular Force).
- Sergeant William Aubrey Biber – Royal New Zealand Air Force.
- Sergeant Ernest Frederick Fraser – Royal New Zealand Air Force.

== Air Force Cross (AFC) ==
- Flying Officer Ian Albert Hutchins – Royal New Zealand Air Force.

== Queen's Commendation for Valuable Service in the Air ==
- Flight Lieutenant Helge Hall Torgersen – Royal New Zealand Air Force.
