= Karauria =

Karauria is both a given name and a surname. It is a Māori transliteration of the name Claudius, Claude, or Claudia. Notable people with the name include:

== Given name ==
- Karauria Tiweka Anaru, better known as Claude Anaru (1901–1977), New Zealand politician and community leader

== Surname ==
- Brackin Karauria-Henry (born 1988), New Zealand rugby player
- Airini Karauria, better known as Airini Donnelly, (c. 1855–1909), New Zealand tribal leader, lawyer, and landowner
