= Nevile Lodge =

New Zealand cartoonist (1918–1989)

Nevile Sidney Lodge OBE (19 May 1918 – 7 March 1989) was a New Zealand cartoonist. He was cartoonist for Wellington's Evening Post for over 40 years, as well as the New Zealand Truth, the Listener, and the New Zealand Free Lance.

== Early life ==
Nevile Lodge was born in Timaru, South Canterbury, New Zealand on 19 May 1918. He was educated at Rongotai College and Wellington College of Technical Art, working as an assistant window-dresser before the Second World War. During the war he served with the 2nd New Zealand Expeditionary Force and was captured by the Italians at El Alamein in July 1942 and interned in a POW camp in Italy. In 1943 he escaped at the Italian Armistice but was captured by a German patrol and taken to a German prison camp, where he remained a prisoner until the end of the war.

== Career ==
Lodge began cartooning before the war but while serving in the Middle East he contributed cartoons to army publications. When he became a prison of war he drew cartoons of guards, and amused his fellow prisoners. His friend Roy Johnston recalled that he and Lodge were hungry and sold cartoons for two eggs – one for Lodge and one for Johnston. He continued to draw cartoons in the German prison camp, decorating the camp walls with them once they had been passed by the camp censor. He joked that he had "studied on the Continent for three years".

After the war he became a free-lance cartoonist, illustrator and commercial artist working from an office above the vegetable markets in Blair St, Wellington. He became cartoonist for the Evening Post in 1946, as well as drawing sporting cartoons for Saturday's Sports Post. In 1955 he was hospitalised but continued to cartoon from his hospital bed. In 1956, when Neville Colvin left the Evening Post for London, he became the newspaper's editorial cartoonist, continuing to do free-lance work until 1965 when he began working full time for the Evening Post.

In 1970 he visited South Africa and wrote an article, with cartoons, on his impressions of the country. Although Lodge formally retired as resident cartoonist from the Evening Post in 1985, he continued to produce cartoons, drawing his last one for the paper in November 1988.

While Lodge was known for the gentleness of his cartoons, he was an astute observer of politics and society. He saw through politicians rhetoric but on the other hand he depicted readily recognisable scenes of New Zealand life. After his death Prime Minister David Lange and former Prime Minister Robert Muldoon both paid tribute to his work: Lange said "his drawing touched the universal funny-bone"; Muldoon described his work as "shot through with a delightful sense of humour that was never malicious". On his death the Evening Post cartoonist Tom Scott drew a cartoon in tribute for the newspaper.

== Family and personal life ==
He married Patricia Joan Paul in 1952 and they had four children: Christopher, Debbie, Grant and Michael. In his spare time Lodge's hobby was model-making, a past-time he began as a boy in the 1930s.

== Awards and recognition ==
In the 1981 New Year Honours, Lodge was appointed an Officer of the Order of the British Empire, for services as a cartoonist.

An exhibition of Lodge's work was held May–July 2004 at the Museum of Wellington in conjunction with the launching of Lodge Laughs at Wellington.

== Publications ==
Several collections of Lodge's cartoons were published.

- Lodge Looks at Wellington (1952)
- Lodge Laughter: being excerpts from Lodge laughs, Lodge listens, Lodgical conclusions and Lodge looks on, and other cartoons (1954)
- Whitcombe & Tombs' wit and wisdom (1955)
- Lodge Laughs at the Springbok tour: cartoons and comments (1956)
- Lodge Laughs at the Lions tour: cartoons and comments (1959)
- Lodge Laughs at the 1960 All Black tour: cartoons and comments (1960)
- Sporting Laughter: a team of Sports Post covers fielded by Nevile Lodge (1960)
- Lodge Laughs at the 1961 French tour: cartoons and comment (1961)
- Lodge Returns: a replay of cartoons (1964)
- Lodge Laughs again: a cartoon antholodge-y from the Evening Post and Sports Post (1974)
