= Arnold Downer =

New Zealand civil engineer (1895–1984)

Arnold Fielder Downer CBE (born 4 February 1895) was a New Zealand civil engineer, construction contractor and company director who founded the Downer Group in 1933.

== Early life ==
Downer was born in Alexandra, Victoria, Australia, on 4 February 1895, the son of Edwin Harry Downer (died 24 October 1945), a builder, and his wife Mary Ann McMinn (died 13 January 1956).

In 1899, the family emigrated to New Zealand and settled in Feilding, where Downer attended Manchester Street School and the Feilding District High School, before completing his higher education at Wanganui Technical College.

After leaving high school he obtained a cadetship in 1913 with the Public Works Department and was employed in their Dunedin office on a number of projects in Otago and Southland.

== World War I ==
He enlisted in the New Zealand Expeditionary Force in September 1915. Commissioned from the ranks, he served in Egypt with the Corps of New Zealand Engineers, and later in France with the New Zealand Field Artillery. He later served in the army of occupation in Germany. Upon his discharge in early 1919, he opted to stay in Europe and studied civil engineering at the School of Engineering at London University in London for a period before returning to New Zealand later that year. After his return to New Zealand, he continued his engineering studies at the Canterbury University College which allowed him to be registered as a civil engineer.

== Public works department ==
After obtaining his registration Downer rejoined the Public Works Department. He undertook a number of railway surveys in the Hawkes Bay and Northland before, in 1927, he was appointed engineer in charge of the Wellington–Tawa Flat deviation of the main trunk railway line.

== Mount Victoria tunnel ==
In 1930, Downer left the Public Works Department to take a position with the Hansford and Mills Construction Company as their engineer in charge of tunnelling on the construction of Wellington's Mount Victoria road tunnel. It was the company's first tunnelling project. Despite having already completed a number of large projects in New Zealand, the company's lack of tunnelling experience and the financial pressures of the Depression drove it into liquidation. The company's receiver asked Downer to remain on the project and appointed him project manager. Downer was able to complete the project within its original planned completion date.

== Downer & Co. ==
His work on the Mount Victoria tunnel had introduced Downer to Arch McLean, George McLean (who had supplied some of the plant for the tunnel) and Billy Mill. After the tunnel was completed in 1931, Downer and George McLean worked together on the development and operation of an alluvial gold claim at Ruatapu on the West Coast.

The new company subsequently won the contract with Dunedin Council for construction of a surge tank and tunnel on the Waipori Hydroelectric Scheme. In 1935 they won a contract to construct an 8.5-mile (13.7 km) access road from Upper Takaka to the Cobb Power Station.

== Homer tunnel ==
When the Public Works Department restarted work on the Homer Tunnel after having previously stopped work, Downers and Co were contracted in 1937 to drive a pilot tunnel. Downers provided the labour and management while the Public Works Department provided all equipment and material. Arnold Downer (accompanied by his wife) spent time at the site supervising the work.

== World War II ==
In November 1941, Arnold Downer as project manager for the construction of new airfields near Namaka (Nausori) on Viti Levu Island in Fiji.

Three airfields, each with a runway measuring 2,100 by 152.4 metres (6,890 by 500 ft), with revetments and servicing areas, were built by a workforce that at its peak reached 3,000 men. With work continuing under lights at night due to the urgency, the first was ready by 15 January 1942 and the other two by 15 April 1942.

Following the completion of the airfields on Fiji, Arnold Downer was involved in the construction of airfields at Aitutaki and Penrhyn in the Cook Islands.

== Roxburgh hydro power station ==
By 1953, it was necessary to introduce power rationing in the South Island due to the shortage of generation. In early 1954 with the consortium making poor progress on the completion of Roxburgh the government decided that this, as well as strained relationships between the consortium and the government's supervising engineers, could not continue. They decided that the consortium needed as a partner a New Zealand company which offered proven reliability and local knowledge. As a result, they requested that Downers and Company send directors to attend in two days time a meeting at the Prime Minister's summer cottage on 24 April 1954. At this meeting which was attended by representatives of the consortium, Arnold Downer and Arch McLean were asked by the government for Downer and Company to enter the consortium as the managing partner with a 25% interest. They agreed, which led to the existing contract being cancelled and a schedule of rates contract agreed upon with the renamed Cubitts Zschokke Downer.

Other than submission of an unsuccessful tender to undertake the entire project Downer and Company's only involvement in the project had been the construction of the concrete plant.

By 11:20 am on 23 July 1956, the lake had filled to the crest of the spillway water.

== Later career ==
Arnold Downer had long been a director of William Cable Holdings, a long established company which by the mid-1950s was looking for opportunities to expand its construction activities. As it seemed advantageous to both parties Downer and Company merged with, and became a major subsidiary of, William Cable Holdings in 1954.

== Awards and honours ==
In the 1956 Queen's Birthday Honours, Downer was appointed a Commander of the Order of the British Empire, in recognition of his services as engineer in charge of various public works.

== Personal life ==
Arnold Downer married concert singer Phyllis Lorimer Massey in Sydney on 14 September 1927. The couple had no children, but brought up a young nephew of Phyllis's following the death of his mother.
