= Viva Donaldson =

New Zealand politician and teacher (1893–1970)

Viva Donaldson MBE JP (12 March 1893 – 2 August 1970) was a New Zealand teacher, nurse, community leader and local politician. She was born in Auckland, New Zealand, on 12 March 1893.

In 1953, Donaldson was awarded the Queen Elizabeth II Coronation Medal. In the 1956 Queen's Birthday Honours, she was appointed a Member of the Order of the British Empire, for public services.
