= Caralee McLiesh =

Australian economist

Caralee McLiesh PSM
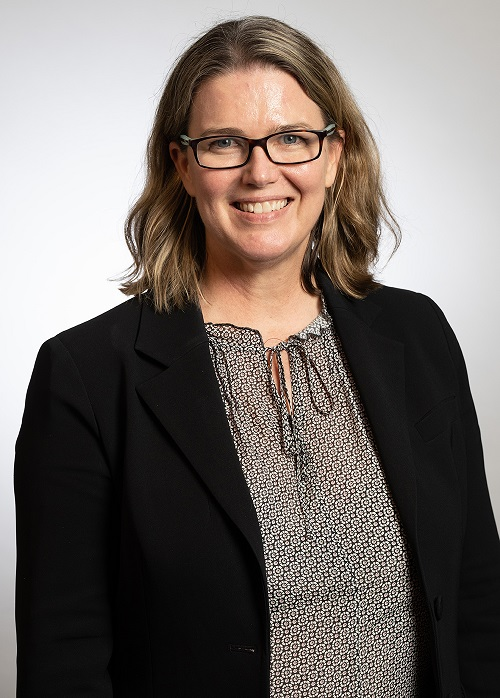

16th Auditor-General for Australia
- Incumbent
- Assumed office November 2024
- Preceded by: Grant Hehir

New Zealand Treasury Secretary and Chief Executive
- In office September 2019 – August 2024
- Preceded by: Gabriel Makhlouf
- Succeeded by: Iain Rennie

Personal details
- Education: Australian National University University of Melbourne

Caralee McLiesh PSM FCPA is an Australian economist and senior public servant who is currently serving as the auditor-general for the Commonwealth of Australia. She was previously Chief Executive and Secretary to the New Zealand Treasury from 2019 to 2024.

== Early life and education ==
McLiesh holds a Bachelor of Economics with First Class Honours from the Australian National University and a PhD in Finance from the University of Melbourne. Her thesis investigated the development of a comprehensive theory of takeover activity. She has published several reports and books through the World Bank press and research papers in economic journals. She is a fellow of Certified Practising Accountants (FCPA).

== Early career ==
McLiesh was an Associate and Senior Associate at the Boston Consulting Group in Melbourne and worked for the International Red Cross in Bosnia, Herzegovina and Botswana as a Development Delegate. Between 2000 and 2007, McLiesh worked in a number of roles for the World Bank in Washington D.C. including Programme Manager and Senior Economist.

McLiesh spent 10 years at the New South Wales Treasury. In this time, she held four different roles: Deputy Secretary, Fiscal and Economic; Deputy Secretary, Agency Budget and Policy; Deputy Secretary Human and Social Services, and; executive director, Human and Social Services. Notably her role in the NSW government saw her leading the development of State Budgets covering AUS$80 billion operating expenditure and AUS$350 billion in assets. In 2017 Caralee was awarded a Public Service Medal for outstanding public service to social impact investment policy and reform in New South Wales.

From 2018 to 2019, she was managing director at Technical and Further Education, New South Wales. The managing director role oversaw a budget of A$1.8 billion and workforce of 17,000 people.

== New Zealand Treasury ==
Regarding McLiesh's appointment as Chief Executive and Secretary to the New Zealand Treasury in September 2019, economist Eric Crampton praised her academic experience in advancing New South Wales's social impact agenda. She was the first woman to hold the position. Her period of employment included the COVID-19 pandemic and the 2023 transition between Labour and National-led governments.

During her keynote speech at the joint Reserve Bank of New Zealand–Treasury macroeconomic workshop in 2021 McLiesh emphasised that New Zealand's economy was just one of three economies that had maintained a positive GDP during the COVID-19 period. Treasury's management of COVID-19 saw directed and targeted response measures that supported short-term and long-term fiscal policies that minimised disruption and dislocation of the business and workforce relationship. Carrying out exit interviews at the end of her term, McLiesh commented in favour of New Zealand adopting a capital gains tax and a more efficient superannuation scheme.

In July 2024 McLiesh announced she would not seek a second term as Treasury secretary and that she would return to Canberra. On 1 August 2024 McLiesh's appointment as Auditor-General for Australia was made public. She was succeeded at the Treasury by Iain Rennie.

== Auditor-General ==
The office of Auditor-General is a ten-year statutory appointment made by the Governor-General on the advice of the Prime Minister. McLeish was announced in the role on 1 August 2024 and commenced the position on 4 November.

Government offices
Preceded by Gabriel Makhlouf	Chief Executive and Secretary to the New Zealand Treasury; 2019 – 2024	Succeeded by Iain Rennie
Preceded by Grant Hehir	Auditor-General for Australia; 2024 – present	Incumbent
