= Mary Reidy =

New Zealand nurse (1880–1977)

Mary Reidy MBE
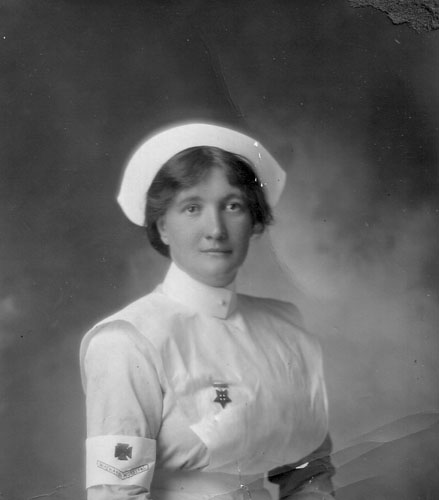
- Mary Reidy in 1916
- Born: Mary Anne Reidy; 17 June 1880; County Clare, Ireland
- Died: 17 January 1977 (aged 96); Hamilton, New Zealand
- Resting place: St. Mary's Catholic Church, Hamilton, New Zealand
- Occupation: Nurse
- Known for: Being a community leader, military service

Mary Anne Reidy MBE (1880–1977) was a New Zealand civilian and military nurse and community leader. She was born in County Clare, Ireland in 1880. Reidy served as a nurse for the New Zealand military from January 1916 to December 1918. The next 26 years of her life were spent attempting to preserve the hospital at Kawhia and ensuring the welfare of returned soldiers. She became a widely respected figure in her community. Reidy died on 17 January 1977.

== Early life ==
Reidy was born on 17 June 1880, at Kilmihil, but her family had moved to Auckland before she was 22. She then helped her father around the house for two years before her nursing career.

== Nursing career ==
In 1904, Reidy began to work at the Mater Misericordiae Hospital, starting out by washing dishes, but she soon became a nurse. In 1911, when Reidy was 31, she received formal training at the Waikato Hospital for three years.

== Military service ==
Reidy served in the military from January 1916 to December 1918. Initially posted in England she nursed at the No 1 New Zealand Stationary Hospital at Wisques, France from 1917 to 1918. She was very kind to the men, who nicknamed her "Ten Franc Reidy" for the money she lent to soldiers. She concluded her service after the hospital closed.

== Kawhia Hospital ==
After a brief stint training nurses at Waikato Hospital, Reidy took control of the cottage hospital in Kawhia, where she had been appointed Sister in 1921, and which faced closure due to finances. She was a tyrant, but a loving one. She worked for twenty-six years at various fundraisers to keep the hospital solvent, including a dog swimming race, as late as 1957. In the 1956 Queen's Birthday Honours, she was appointed a Member of the Order of the British Empire, for her contribution to back-blocks nursing and for the welfare of returned servicemen.
