= Iain Rennie =

New Zealand public servant

Iain Rennie CNZM
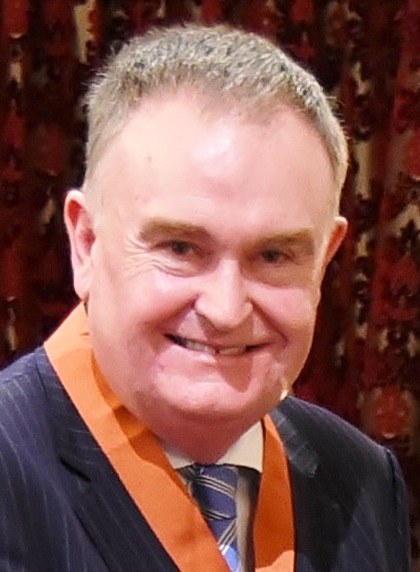
- Rennie in 2017

Secretary to the Treasury
- In office 30 November 2024 – present
- Prime Minister: Christopher Luxon
- Preceded by: Caralee McLiesh

State Services Commissioner
- In office 1 July 2008 – 2016
- Prime Minister: Helen Clark; John Key
- Preceded by: Mark Prebble
- Succeeded by: Peter Hughes

Personal details
- Born: 1964 (age 61–62) Wellington, New Zealand

Iain Robert Rennie CNZM (born 1964) is a New Zealand economist and senior public servant. He was State Services Commissioner from 2008 to 2016 and has been Secretary to the Treasury since November 2024.

== Early life and education ==
Rennie has a Bachelor of Arts with Honours in economics from Victoria University of Wellington. He also completed an Oxford Strategic Leadership Programme at Templeton College at the University of Oxford.

== Career ==
Rennie joined the Treasury in 1986 as an economic and financial analyst. Work he was involved with included the development of the Reserve Bank of New Zealand Act 1989. From 1989 to 1993 he was seconded to work as an economic advisor to opposition leader and (from 1990) prime minister Jim Bolger. He returned to the Treasury to work as a manager of fiscal analysis and budget management. From 1997 to 2007 he was deputy secretary of regulatory and tax policy.

In 2007 he transferred to the State Services Commission as the deputy state services commissioner to Mark Prebble. The following year, when Prebble retired. Rennie was promoted to State Services Commissioner and the head of state services. After completing an initial five-year term, he was reappointed for a three-year term in July 2013. Rennie retired in 2016 and was succeeded by Peter Hughes. In his role as Commissioner, Rennie was involved in driving state sector reform in line with the Government's objectives. The State Sector Amendment Act 2013 gave him greater responsibility for developing senior leadership and management capability, including appointments to key positions within the public service.

In retirement, Rennie took on economic consultancy contracts. He was appointed independent chair of the Treasury's Financial Statements of Government Audit Committee in 2021. In November 2024 he was announced as the Secretary to the Treasury, succeeding Caralee McLeish.

== Honours and awards ==
Rennie was appointed a Companion of the New Zealand Order of Merit, for services to the State, in the 2017 New Year Honours.

Government offices
Preceded by Mark Prebble	State Services Commissioner; 1 July 2008 – July 2016	Succeeded by Peter Hughes
Preceded by Caralee McLiesh	Secretary to the Treasury; 2024–present	Incumbent
