= Rei Hamon =

New Zealand landscape artist (1919–2008)

Rei Hamon CBE
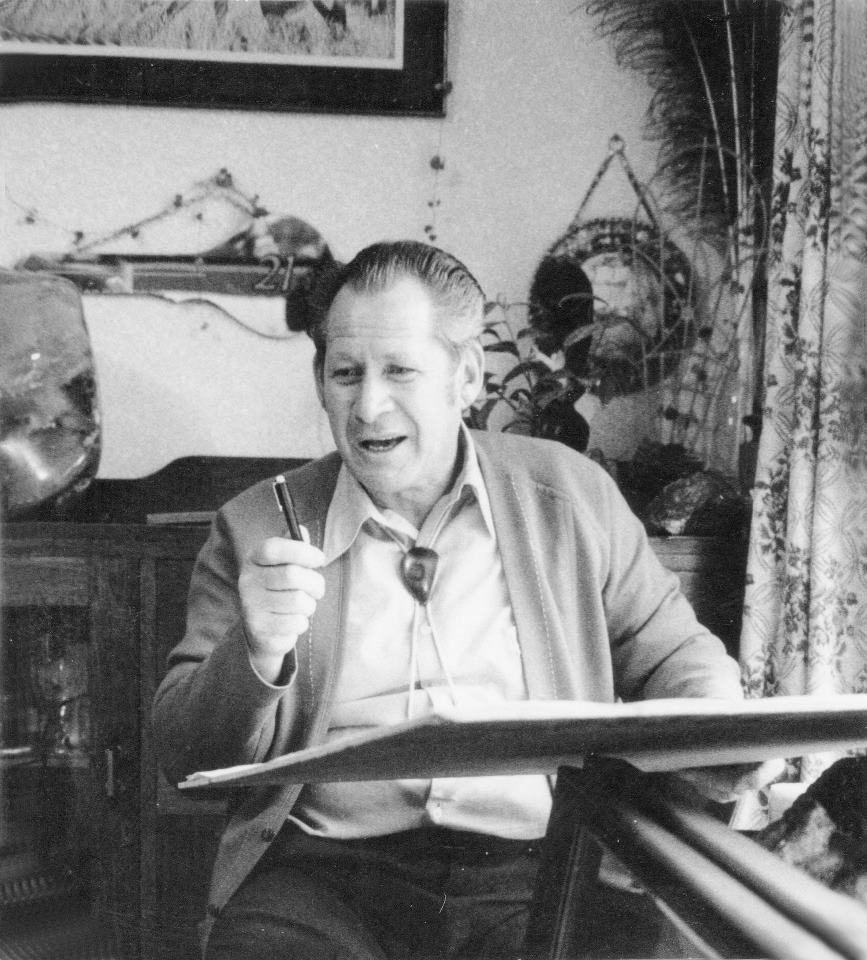
- Born: Francis Rei Paul Hamon; 17 December 1919; Gisborne, New Zealand
- Died: 16 August 2008 (aged 88); Thames, New Zealand
- Occupation: Painter
- Style: Pointillism
- Spouse: Maia Pohoiwi Weti
- Parent(s): Henry Hixon Hamon; Edith Violet Osborne

Francis Rei Paul Hamon CBE (17 December 1919 – 16 August 2008) was a New Zealand landscape artist. In 1976, his lithograph Jewels of Okarito was presented to Queen Elizabeth II by the New Zealand Government on the occasion of a state visit.

Hamon was born in 1919. He was the son of a white mother and a part-Maori father and grew up in Gisborne, New Zealand.

== Career ==
Utilizing a self-taught style of pointillism, Hamon's familiarity with the flora and fauna of the bush grew from the time that he worked splitting posts for sheep pens in the forests of the Urewera area.

Hamon was appointed a Commander of the Order of the British Empire, for services to art, in the 1981 New Year Honours. In 2010, a documentary on Hamon premiered, Rei Hamon: Man of Nature.

== Personal life ==
Hamon was the oldest of fourteen children and the father of fourteen more. Hamon was a member of the Church of Jesus Christ of Latter-day Saints (LDS Church).

== See also ==
- Chuck Close
- Henri-Edmond Cross
