= Bernie Galvin =

New Zealand economist (1993-2010)

Bernie Galvin CB

Secretary to the Treasury
- In office 1980–1986
- Preceded by: Noel Lough
- Succeeded by: Graham Scott

Personal details
- Born: Bernard Vincent Joseph Galvin; 15 March 1933 Brooklyn, Wellington, New Zealand
- Died: 2 June 2010 (aged 77) Wellington, New Zealand
- Spouses: Beverley Snook (div. 1979); Margaret Clark (m. 1980)
- Children: 4
- Relatives: Michael Galvin (son)
- Education: St Patrick's College, Wellington; Victoria University College; Harvard University
- Profession: Public servant; economist

Bernard Vincent Joseph Galvin CB (15 March 1933 – 2 June 2010) was a New Zealand public servant and economist. He served as the Secretary to the Treasury from 1980 to 1986, heading the department during a pivotal transition in New Zealand economic history that spanned the late Muldoon era interventionist policies and the initial implementation of market-oriented economic reforms known as Rogernomics.

== Early life and education ==
Galvin was born in the Wellington suburb of Brooklyn on 15 March 1933, the son of Margaret Jane and Eustace Bartholomew Galvin. He was educated at St Patrick's College, Wellington, where he was dux in 1948 and 1949, and went on to study economics at Victoria University College, graduating with a Bachelor of Arts degree in 1954. He later undertook graduate studies at Harvard University, earning a Master of Public Administration degree in 1961, and brought back economics-focused frameworks to the New Zealand public sector.

== Career ==
In 1955, Galvin joined the New Zealand Treasury as its first graduate recruit. During his early career, he spent time seconded to the Department of External Affairs and served in London as economic counsellor between 1965 and 1968.

Galvin later returned to executive policy roles, serving as permanent head of the Prime Minister's Department from 1976 to 1980 under Prime Minister Robert Muldoon. Between 1975 and 1986, he was a governor of the World Bank and the International Monetary Fund.

In late 1980, Galvin succeeded Noel Lough as Secretary to the Treasury. During the early 1980s, Galvin managed the department's economic advice amid increasing tension between Treasury's preference for structural reform and Muldoon's regulatory controls.

Following the election of the Fourth Labour Government in July 1984, Galvin oversaw the publication of Treasury's influential briefing paper, Economic Management (1984). The document provided the analytical foundation for Finance Minister Roger Douglas to enact comprehensive deregulation, tax reform, and floating of the New Zealand dollar.

Galvin retired as Secretary to the Treasury in 1986 and was succeeded by Graham Scott. Following his departure from Treasury, he served as chair of the Economic Development Commission from 1986 to 1989, and chaired the ministerial working party on the Accident Compensation Commission in 1991.

== Personal life and death ==
Galvin's first marriage was to Beverley Snook, a social worker, and the couple had four children, including actor Michael Galvin, before divorcing in 1979. He remarried in 1980, to political scientist Margaret Clark.

In 1988, Galvin authored Policy Coordination in Government: The New Zealand Experience, evaluating public sector management reforms and executive government advisory structures.

Galvin died in Wellington on 2 June 2010 after a short illness, at the age of 77, and he was buried in Mākara Cemetery. His second wife, Margaret Clark, conferred a damehood in 2009, died in 2026.

== Honours and awards ==
In 1977, Galvin was awarded the Queen Elizabeth II Silver Jubilee Medal. In the 1987 New Year Honours, he was appointed a Companion of the Order of the Bath, for public services.

Government offices
Preceded by Noel Lough	Secretary to the Treasury; 1980–1986	Succeeded by Graham Scott
