= Airini A'Court =

New Zealand painter (born 1953)

Airini A'Court (born 1953) is a New Zealand painter based in Wellington.

== Early life ==
Airini A'Court was born in 1953 in New Zealand.

== Education ==
A'Court completed a graphic design course at the Wellington Polytechnic.

== Career ==
A'Court worked as a commercial artist in illustration, poster art and fashion, and between 1972 and 1979 she worked as a designer for the New Zealand Railways Corporation.

In 1984, A'Court formed a freelancing partnership with a journalist, and for three years illustrated the Wellington Evening Post's "Style" column.

A'Court began painting full-time in 1992 after winning the Caltex Art Award for painting. Her influences include Egon Schiele and Henri de Toulouse-Lautrec.

A'Court has exhibited extensively in New Zealand, and notable exhibitions include the following:

Solo exhibitions:

- Mostly People at Tinakori Gallery, Wellington, 1994. This was A'Court's first exhibition at a dealer gallery as a new artist, a break with tradition for Tinakori Gallery by gallery director Marcia Shaw.
- Synergy at the Chiaroscuro Gallery, Auckland, 1996. This solo exhibition presented portraits and nudes in bright reds and blues, and was favourably reviewed by T.J. McNamara of The New Zealand Herald.
- Scent of a Woman at Statements Gallery, Napier, 1997.

Group exhibitions:

- Academy Women - A Century of Inspiration at the Academy of Fine Arts, Wellington, 1993. This exhibition was curated to mark the centenary of women's suffrage in New Zealand, and featured historical and contemporary works by 163 women associated with the Academy of Fine Arts since its inception in 1882. Some of the historical artists represented included Mollie Tripe, Rita Angus, Eve Page and Olivia Spencer Bower. The contemporary section included works by Janet Paul, Heather Busch, Shona McFarlane, Helen Kedgely and A'Court.
- Body Forms, a group exhibition at Statements Gallery in Napier, 1995. A'Court's works were paintings of female nudes, which were presented alongside bronze works by Heather McLeod, an artist from Dunedin.
- Upstairs Art at Mahara Gallery in Waikanae, 1995. This group show presented works by twelve women artists from around the Wellington region, and included works by Mollie Walter, Sylvia Meek, Hazel Brookes, Mary Archibald, Judith Salmon, Judith Sullivan, Susan Webb, Peggy Ellis, Pat White, Ele Street and Jan Doyle.
- New paintings by Airini A'Court and Gary Waldrom at Statements Gallery, Napier, 2002. This exhibition presented new works from A'Court and painter Gary Waldrom, from Central Hawke's Bay.
- Salon de Refuse: Norsewear Art Award at Wine Country Gallery, Havelock North, in 2004. This exhibition presented finalists of the 2004 Norsewear Art Award, including A'Court's work titled Aotearoa 04.

== Personal life ==
A'Court's son, Harry A'Court, is the Creative Director of Wellington-based studio Inject Design.

== Awards ==
- Merit award winner in the 1998 Norsewear Art Awards for her painting Enigma.
