= Airini Woodhouse =

New Zealand author and historian (1896–1989)

Airini Woodhouse QSM
- Born: Airini Elizabeth Rhodes; 8 November 1896; Dunedin, New Zealand
- Died: 13 April 1989 (aged 92); Timaru, New Zealand
- Occupation: Author
- Spouse: Randal Woodhouse
- Relatives: George Rhodes (grandfather); Arthur Rhodes (uncle); Heaton Rhodes (cousin); John Carne Bidwill (great-uncle); Robert Heaton Rhodes (great-uncle); William Barnard Rhodes (great-uncle)

Airini Elizabeth Woodhouse QSM (née Rhodes; 8 November 1896 – 13 April 1989) was a New Zealand community leader, historian, and author.

== Personal life ==
Airini Elizabeth Rhodes was born in Dunedin, New Zealand, on 8 November 1896. She was an only child. She grew up on Blue Cliffs, Canterbury, one of her family's sheep-stations. Arini was educated a governess and showed an early aptitude for writing. In 1913 she attended Craighead Diocesan School in Timaru.

On 22 September 1921 Arini married Randal Woodhouse at Upper Otaio. Her husband was the Medical Superintendent of Wellington Hospital, Shortly afterwards Randal resigned from his position to learn farming so he could be the manager of Blue Cliffs station. Arini had inherited a first option on the station from her father's estate. The couple established a life on Blue Cliffs station and had three children, Elizabeth, Carne, and Heaton. Arini's husband died on 1 October 1970 and Arini moved into her mother's house in Timaru.

Arini died on 13 April 1989.

== Career ==
Woodhouse joined the Red Cross during World War I and continued to work for them in World War II. She was president of the Blue Cliffs, Canterbury, sub-centre of the Red Cross during both wars, and was awarded a Voluntary Aid Detachment medal for service 1939–1945.

She was elected to the Blue Cliffs parish vestry in 1927, the first year women were admitted, and remained a member until 1961.

In the late 1950s, she and her husband became interested in the Māori rock drawings found in South Canterbury and campaigned for their preservation. She was on the committee of the South Canterbury Historical Society from its inception, and chair of the South Canterbury Centennial History Committee (1954–60). She also chaired the South Canterbury Regional Committee of the New Zealand Historic Places Trust from 1959 to 1975. In 1965 the South Canterbury Regional Committee named a peak in the Hunters Hills range after her, Mount Airini.

In 1969 she became the first woman in New Zealand to be granted registration as an owner-classer by the New Zealand Wool Handling Committee, allowing her to put the Kiwi brand on her bales.

In the 1981 New Year Honours, Woodhouse was awarded the Queen's Service Medal for community service.

=== Published works ===
She is the author of:

- Tales of pioneer women (1988)
- Blue Cliffs: the biography of a South Canterbury sheep station, 1856–1970 (1982)
- New Zealand Farm and Station Verse 1850–1950 (1967)
- Blue Cliffs School and District Activities 1910–1960 (1960)
- Guthrie-Smith of Tutira (1959)
- George Rhodes of the Levels and his Brothers (1937)
- The History of the Parish of Otaio and Blue Cliffs (with J. Hay, 1930)
- Bidwill of Pihautea: the life of Charles Robert Bidwill (1927)
