= Bernard Ashwin =

Senior public servant, economist (1896–1975)

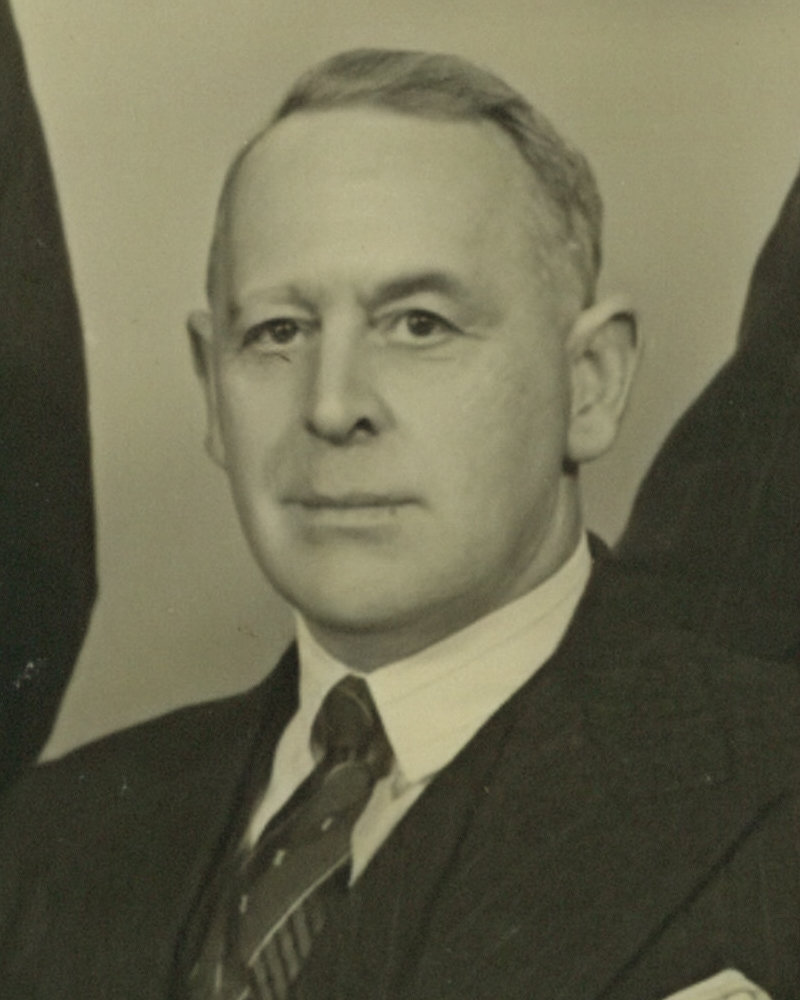
Ashwin in 1943

Sir Bernard Carl Ashwin KBE CMG (22 September 1896 – 12 February 1975) was a New Zealand senior public servant and economist. He was born in Paeroa, New Zealand, on 22 September 1896.

He was Secretary (i.e. head) of the New Zealand Treasury from 1939 to 1955.

Ashwin was appointed a Companion of the Order of St Michael and St George in the 1946 New Year Honours. In 1953, he was awarded the Queen Elizabeth II Coronation Medal. In the 1956 Queen's Birthday Honours, he was appointed a Knight Commander of the Order of the British Empire.
