= Graham Scott (public servant) =

New Zealand technocrat (born 1942)

Graham Scott CB

Secretary to the Treasury of New Zealand
- In office 1986–1993
- Preceded by: Bernie Galvin
- Succeeded by: Murray Horn

Personal details
- Born: Graham Cecil Scott; 26 May 1942 (age 84)
- Spouse: Claudia deVita Scott
- Education: Duke University (MA, PhD); University of Canterbury (MCom)

Graham Cecil Scott CB (born 1942) is a former official of the New Zealand government and a political candidate.

After a 1972 PhD from Duke University titled 'Industrial production and investment in a dynamic, multiregional, interindustry model of the United States,' he became Secretary of the New Zealand Treasury in 1986, and held that post until 1993. He later headed the Health Funding Authority and the Central Regional Health Authority. He was the executive chairman of Southern Cross Advisors Ltd.

In the 1995 Queen's Birthday Honours, Scott was appointed a Companion of the Order of the Bath, for public services.

In the 2005 elections, he was ranked fifth place on ACT New Zealand's party list, but the party did not gain enough votes for him to enter Parliament.

Government offices
Preceded by Bernie Galvin	Secretary to the Treasury; 1986-1993	Succeeded by Murray Horn
