= Airini Donnelly =

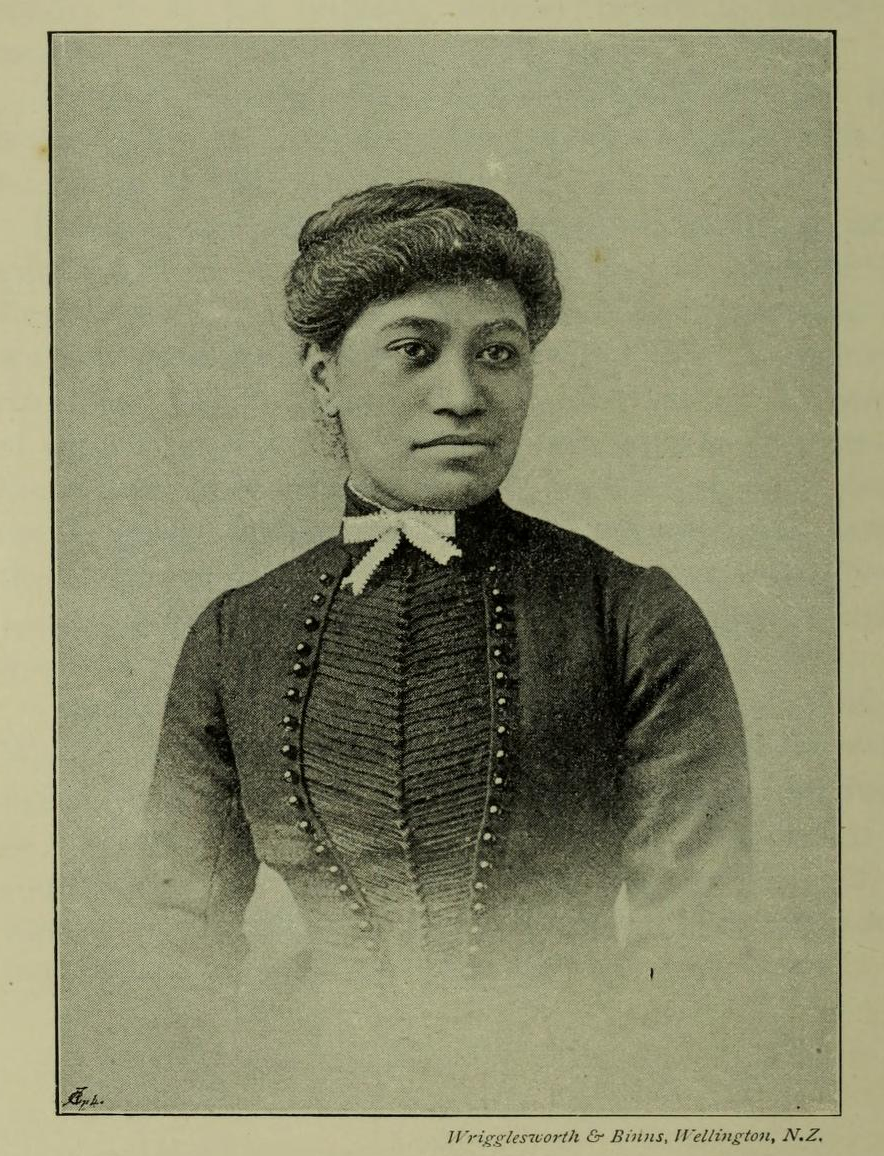

Airini Karauria Tamiwhakakiteaoterangi Donnelly or Airini Tonore (c. 1855 – 7 June 1909) was a New Zealand tribal leader, lawyer, and landowner of Māori descent; she identified with the Ngāti Kahungunu iwi. She served as an advocate in the Native Land Court in Rangitikei and was involved in numerous land deals that made her powerful.

She was born in Puketapu, Hawke's Bay, New Zealand where her mother was Haromi Te Ata and her father was Ngati Kahungunu chief Karauria or Karauria Pupu, she was the eldest of five children. She was the great-niece of Tareha Te Moananui. Her father died in battle at Gate Pā on 29 April 1864, after which she was sent to live with an uncle of her mother, Rēnata Kawepō, who sought to educate her in Māori lore and in the English language.

Her marriage to an Irish immigrant George Prior Donnelly took place in 1877, a year after she had initially met him while out horseriding. Her husband immigrated to the Hawke's Bay from County Tipperary in 1862. They had a daughter, Maude Airini Tiakitai, and a son, Henare Paraea, who died at three months old. Photographs of Airini and her daughter Maude are held Te Papa Tongarewa Museum of New Zealand, as well as a tangiwai,bowenite stone (pounamu) kuru (ear pendant) that is believed to have belonged to her. She became relatively wealthy, and fell out with some of her Maori relations when she became involved in a dispute over land ownership in a case known as Broughton v. Donnelly.

Airini and her husband were among the special guests seated with the Duke and Duchess of Cornwall during their visit to Rotorua in 1901. Three years later, they toured Europe, where they were presented at court in London. The couple were known to have servants, live well, and entertain.
