= New Zealand Treasury =

Economic and financial policy agency of New Zealand

The Treasury
- Te Tai Ōhanga (Māori)

Agency overview
- Formed: 1840
- Jurisdiction: New Zealand
- Headquarters: Level 3, 1 The Terrace, Wellington 6011
- Employees: 600
- Annual budget: Vote Finance; Total budget for 2025/26 ▼$10,634,584
- Minister responsible: Hon Nicola Willis, Minister of Finance
- Agency executive: Iain Rennie, Chief Executive and Secretary
- Website: treasury.govt.nz

The New Zealand Treasury (Māori: Te Tai Ōhanga) is the central public service department of New Zealand charged with advising the Government on economic policy, assisting with improving the performance of New Zealand's economy, and managing financial resources. The minister responsible for the Treasury is the Minister of Finance of New Zealand; however, from 1996 to 2002, there existed a more specific position of Treasurer of New Zealand. The role was created for Winston Peters by the Fourth National Government under Jim Bolger after the 1996 election, and abolished by Helen Clark's government in 2002.

Treasury has four main functions:

- Provide advice to improve economic and fiscal conditions for high levels of economic growth and improved living standards.
- Monitor and manage the financial affairs of the Crown.
- Assess and test other Government agencies' advice and proposals that have economic and financial implications.
- Provide leadership, with other central agencies, to develop a high-performing State sector.

== History ==
The Treasury is one of New Zealand's oldest institutions, having been first established in 1840. Initially the Treasury consisted of just a few officials responsible for managing the Government's day-to-day financial affairs. In the 1920s the department took on a supervisory role over other departments’ spending and oversight of government borrowing.

However, the most dramatic change to the role of the Treasury came in the 1950s when the department began to develop its role as economic advisor to the Government. The Treasury "hit the spotlight" in this role during a wave of far-reaching, and often controversial, economic reforms in the 1980s and early 1990s (dubbed "Rogernomics" and "Ruthanasia"). This period also coincided with a general shift towards higher scrutiny of government activity and performance, making the Finance portfolio and Treasury operations more transparent.

Since the 1950s, the Treasury has evolved from being a control agency to a "central agency". During this time, departments have become largely free to manage their own resources, with the Treasury's role being to provide central agency leadership, co-ordination and monitoring.

Between 2008 and 2011 Treasury administered the Crown Retail Deposit Guarantee Scheme. Under the scheme the government bailed out nine finance firms including South Canterbury Finance to the value of approximately $2 billion.

As of 30 June 2025, the Treasury employs 600 people, is the Government's lead advisor on economic and financial policy, and has the overall vision of helping governments achieve higher living standards for New Zealanders.

== Role ==
Specific areas of work undertaken by the Treasury include:

- advice on the government's economic strategy and macroeconomic policies
- advice on financial and public sector management systems
- advice on tax strategy, including the objectives of the tax system and the choice and mix of taxes
- advice on Budget strategy and the design of the Budget process. This includes managing the Budget initiatives process and producing the Budget documents
- preparation and publication of macroeconomic, tax revenue and fiscal forecasts, and monitoring of the domestic and international economies
- preparation and publication of monthly and annual consolidated Crown financial statements
- management of the Crown's debt portfolio and associated financial investments
- management of commercial, contractual and Treaty of Waitangi-related claims against the Crown
- advice on the Crown's ownership interests in Crown companies including state-owned enterprises (SOEs), Crown financial institutions and Air New Zealand
- advice on policy interventions, departmental votes and Crown entities to ensure the state's resources and powers are used effectively to achieve the results sought by the elected Government.
- Releasing a Prefu or Pre-election fiscal update before each general election.

=== Statutory reporting ===
In addition to regular reporting obligations as part of the annual financial cycle, the Treasury is required to produce several other documents under the Public Finance Act 1989 including the:

- Statement on long-term fiscal position
- Wellbeing report
- Investment statement
- Pre-election economic and fiscal update
- Half-year economic and fiscal update

These documents must be accompanied by statement of responsibility signed by the Secretary to the Treasury.

== Ministers ==
The Treasury serves 12 portfolios and 8 ministers.

Officeholder	Portfolios	Other responsibilities
Hon Nicola Willis	Lead Minister (The Treasury); Minister of Finance; Minister for Economic Growth; Minister for Social Investment	
Hon David Seymour	Minister for Regulation	Associate Minister of Finance
Hon Shane Jones	Minister for Regional Development	Associate Minister of Finance
Hon Chris Bishop	Minister of Infrastructure; Minister of Transport	Associate Minister of Finance
Hon Simeon Brown	Minister of State Owned Enterprises; Minister of Health	
Hon Scott Simpson	Minister for ACC	
Hon Simon Watts	Minister of Revenue	
Rt Hon Winston Peters	Minister for Rail	

== List of secretaries to the Treasury ==
The Secretary to the Treasury is the public service head of the department. The role was created in 1873 when the offices of paymaster-general and under treasurer were amalgamated.

	Name	Portrait	Term of office
1	Charles Thomas Batkin		1873–1878
2	James Clark Gavin		1878–1890
3	James Barnes Heywood		1890–1906
4	Robert Joseph Collins		1906–1910
5	Joseph William Poynton		1910–1912
6	George Frederick Colin Campbell		1912–1921
7	James Jacob Esson		1922–1925
8	Robert Edward Hayes		1925–1929
9	Alexander Dallas Park		1930–1935
10	George Rodda		1935–1939
11	Bernard Ashwin		1939–1955
12	Ed Greensmith		1955–1964
13	Doug Barker		1964–
14	Noel Davis		−1968
15	Henry Lang		1968–1977
16	Noel Lough		1977–1980
17	Bernie Galvin		1980–1986
18	Graham Scott		1986–1993
19	Murray Horn		1993–1998
20	Alan Bollard		1998 – April 2002
—	Mark Prebble (acting)		April 2002 – 8 April 2003
21	John Whitehead		8 April 2003 – 1 June 2011
22	Gabriel Makhlouf		1 June 2011 – 27 June 2019
23	Caralee McLiesh		16 September 2019 – 15 September 2024
24	Iain Rennie		18 November 2024 – present

== Structure ==
Senior leadership

- Secretary and Chief Executive
  - Chief Economist and Deputy Secretary, Economic System
  - Chief Operating Officer and Deputy Secretary, Strategy, Performance & Engagement
  - Deputy Secretary, Budget & Public Services
  - Deputy Secretary, Financial & Commercial Operations
  - Deputy Secretary, Growth & Public Services
  - Deputy Secretary, Macroeconomics & Growth

== Units within the Treasury ==
=== Debt Management Office ===
The New Zealand Debt Management Office (NZDMO) is the part of The Treasury responsible for managing the Crown's debt, its cash flows and its interest-bearing deposits. The 1988 reforms of the Government's financial management led to its establishment with the aim of improving the management of the Government's debt portfolio.

=== Central Agencies Shared Services ===
Central Agencies Shared Services (CASS) is a shared services centre housed within the Treasury. Set up in March 2012, it provides information technology and management, human resources, and finance services to the Treasury, the Department of the Prime Minister and Cabinet, and the Public Service Commission. Aside from providing these services, the goal of CASS is to set an example for other state sector organisations in sharing service delivery functions.

== Crown company monitoring ==
The Crown owns many companies, including state-owned enterprises, Crown entities, and Crown Research Institutes. The Treasury's Commercial Performance and Governance directorate assists the Crown in the running of these. This directorate includes what was the Crown Ownership Monitoring Unit (COMU, pronounced "co-moo") from November 2009 to February 2014, and before that the Crown Company Monitoring and Advisory Unit.

== Controversies ==
The Treasury has courted controversy, particularly since the Rogernomics reforms of the 1980s. Given the agency's key influence and impact on fiscal policy, it has been accused by critics in recent years of inaccurate forecasts, regulatory capture and political partisanism, and accepting corporate gifts from the financial industry.
