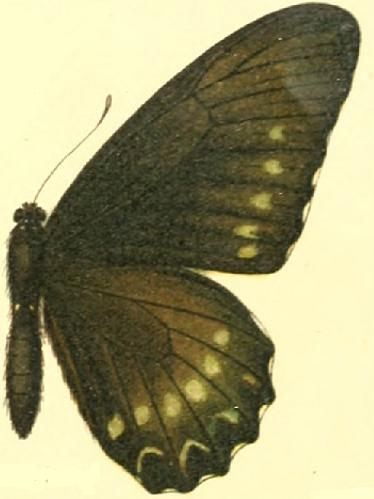

Scientific classification
- Kingdom: Animalia
- Phylum: Arthropoda
- Clade: Pancrustacea
- Class: Insecta
- Order: Lepidoptera
- Family: Papilionidae
- Genus: Battus
- Species: B. polystictus

Binomial name
- Battus polystictus (Butler, 1874)

Synonyms
- Papilio polystictus Butler, 1874; Papilio polystictus janira Rothschild & Jordan, 1906

= Battus polystictus =

Species of butterfly

Battus polystictus is a species of butterfly from the family Papilionidae that is found in Brazil, Paraguay, Uruguay and Argentina.

The larvae feed on Aristolochia brasiliensis, Aristolochia fimbriata and Aristolochia triangularis.

== Subspecies ==
- Battus polystictus polystictus (Brazil: Paraná, Santa Catarina, Rio Grande do Sul, Paraguay, Uruguay, Argentina: Misiones, Corrientes to Buenos Aires) Möhn, 1999, Butterflies of the World 5: 7, plate 9, figures 1-4, plate 19, figures 1-2.
- Battus polystictus galenus (Fruhstorfer, 1907) (Brazil: Minas Gerais, São Paulo, Espirito Santo, Rio de Janeiro) Möhn, 1999, Butterflies of the World 5: 7, plate 9, figures 5-6.
