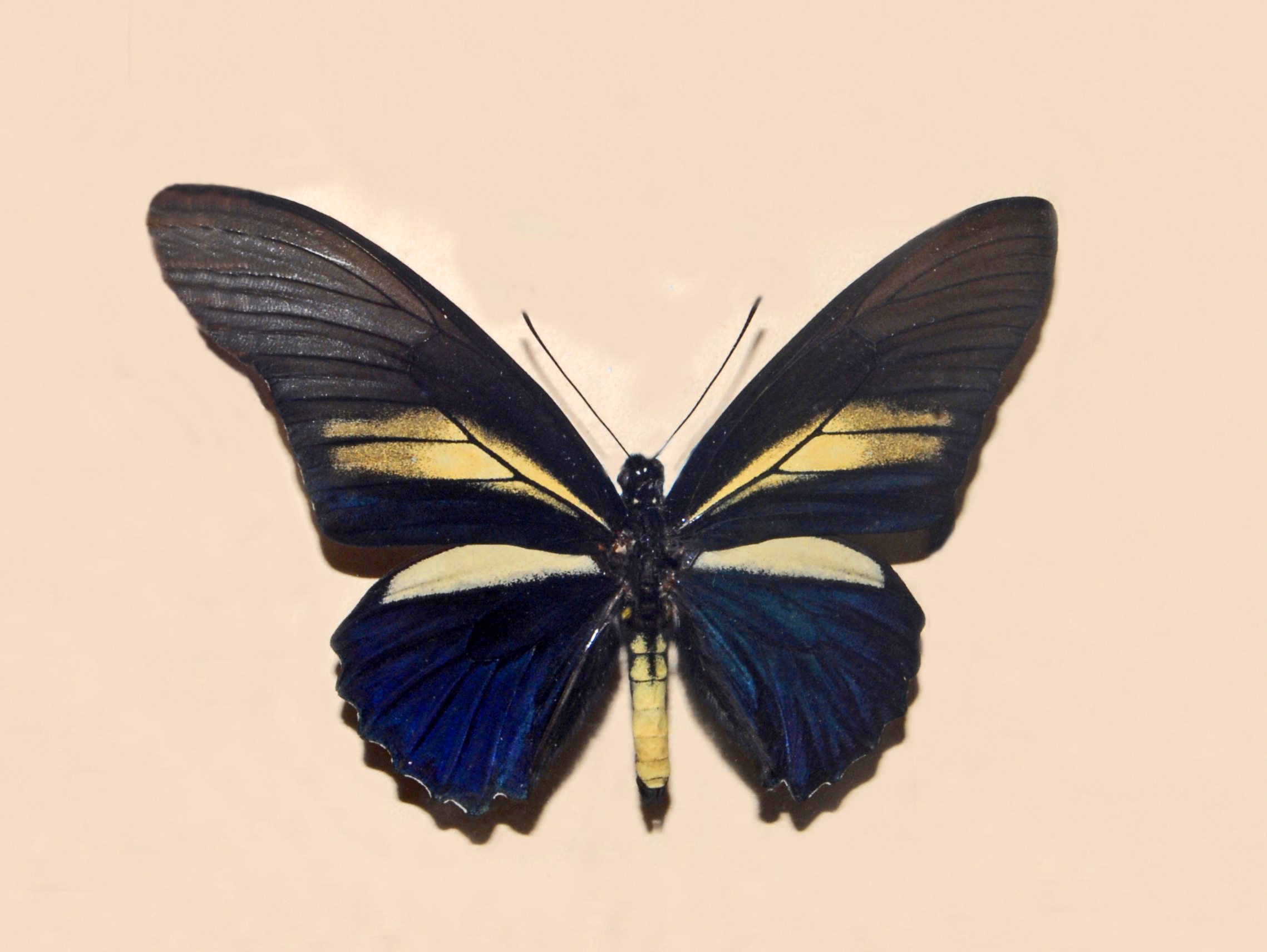
- Mounted specimen on display at Museo di Scienze Naturali Enrico Caffi, Bergamo

Scientific classification
- Kingdom: Animalia
- Phylum: Arthropoda
- Clade: Pancrustacea
- Class: Insecta
- Order: Lepidoptera
- Family: Papilionidae
- Genus: Battus
- Species: B. crassus

Binomial name
- Battus crassus (Cramer, 1777)

Synonyms
- Papilio crassus Cramer, 1777; Battus (Battus) crassus Brown & Mielke, 1967; Papilio lepidus C. & R. Felder, 1861

= Battus crassus =

Crassus swallowtail

Species of butterfly

Battus crassus, the Crassus swallowtail, is a species of butterfly from the family Papilionidae.

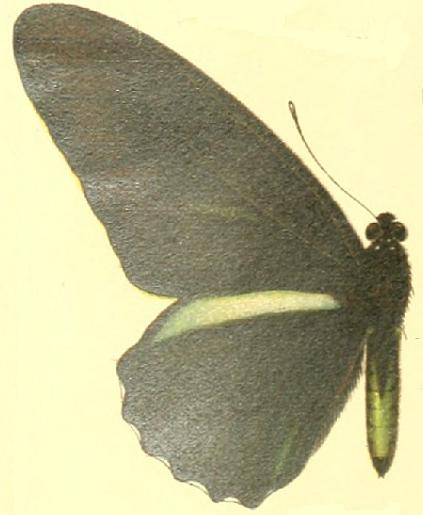
Illustration of a form lacking the forewing patch

== Description ==
A very long-winged species. Forewing with white patches in and below the cell; hindwing with large white costal area, which in the male reaches to the base. In the subspecies lepidus Fldr. the white patches on the upper surface of the forewing are absent.

The black-brown larva (probably variable in its ground colour) has no spots. The thoracic hump of the pupa is very long and divided at the tip.

== Food plants ==
The larvae feed on:

- Aristolochia cymbifera
- Aristolochia esperanzae
- Aristolochia gigantea
- Aristolochia macroura
- Aristolochia veraguensis
- Aristolochia odora
- Aristolochia didyma
- Aristolochia brasiliensis

== Subspecies ==
- Battus crassus crassus (Peru, Surinam, Brazil: Amazonas, Rio de Janeiro, northern Argentina: Misiones)
- Battus crassus hirundo (Röber, 1925) (northern Bolivia)
- Battus crassus paraensis (Brown, 1994) (Brazil: Pará)
- Battus crassus lepidus (C. & R. Felder, 1861) (Costa Rica, Venezuela, western Colombia, western Ecuador)

== Status ==
Widespread but solitary and rarely collected. HERE
