= A. labiata =

A. labiata may refer to:

- Aristolochia labiata, a flowering plant species
- Aurelia labiata, a jellyfish species
