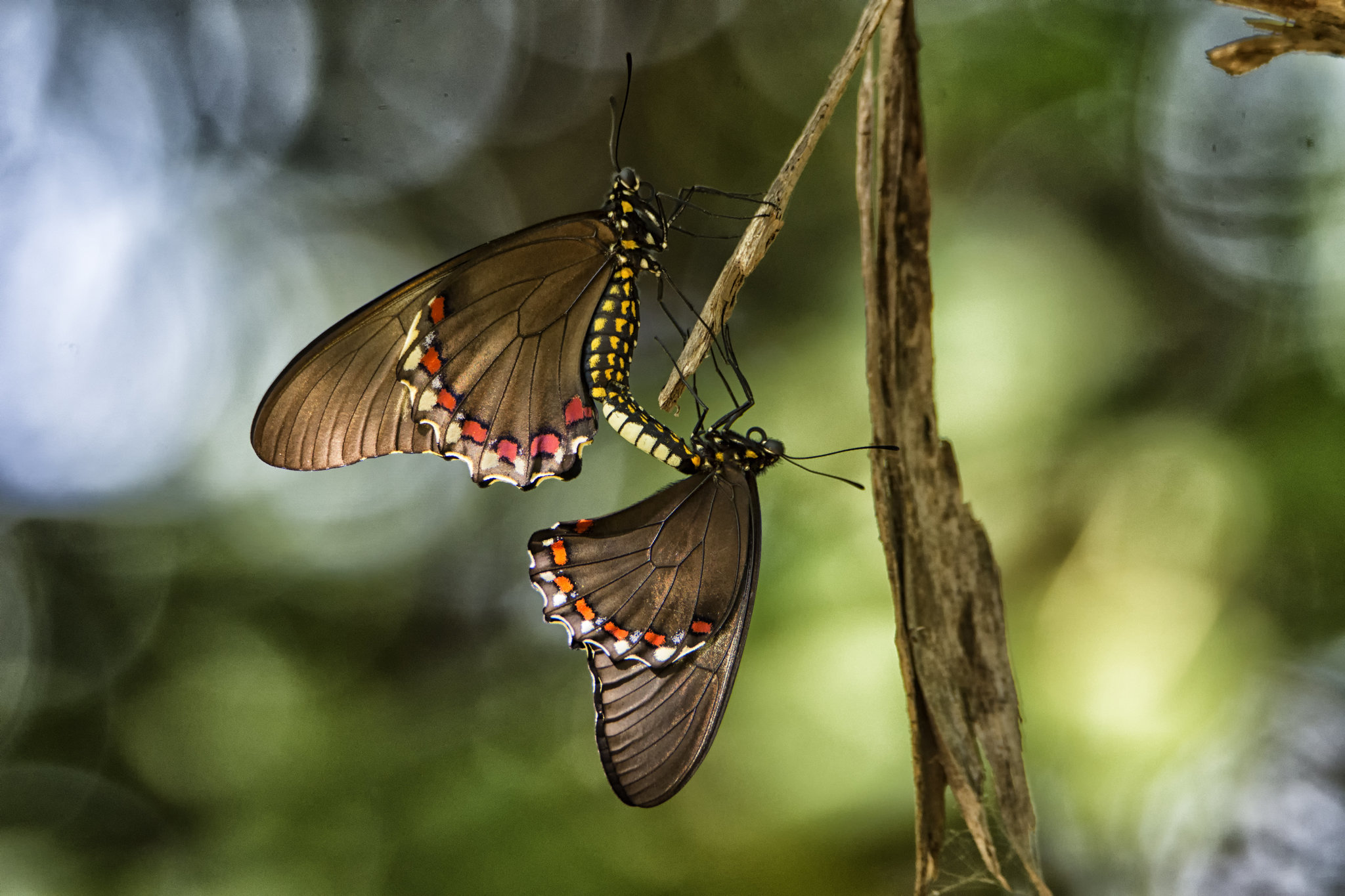

Scientific classification
- Domain: Eukaryota
- Kingdom: Animalia
- Phylum: Arthropoda
- Class: Insecta
- Order: Lepidoptera
- Family: Papilionidae
- Genus: Battus
- Species: B. eracon

Binomial name
- Battus eracon (Godman & Salvin, 1897)

Synonyms
- Papilio eracon Godman & Salvin, 1897; Papilio eracon f. ochracea Vázquez, 1953 preocc. (not Rousseau-Decelle, 1933); Papilio eracon ab. incolorus Vázquez, 1957

= Battus eracon =

West-Mexican swallowtail

Species of butterfly

Battus eracon, the west-Mexican swallowtail or Colima swallowtail, is a species of butterfly in the family Papilionidae. It is found in western Mexico where it is local and uncommon. The larvae feed on Aristolochia tentaculata.

== Description ==
The forewing has a row of submarginal spots. The hindwing has a uniformly curved band of spots, placed about midway between the cell and the outer margin. Under surface of the hindwing has red submarginal spots, each with a yellowish white dot at the outer side.
