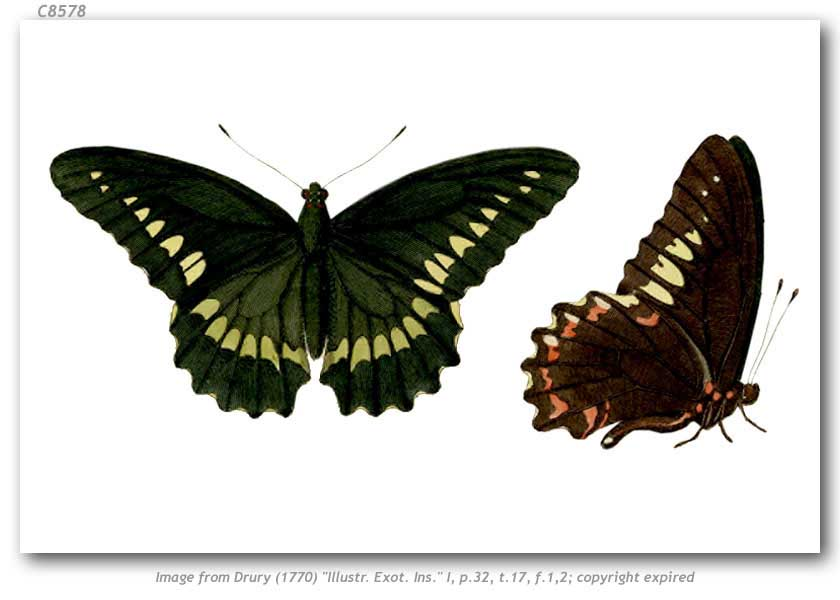
- Male

Conservation status
- Extinct (IUCN 3.1)

Scientific classification
- Domain: Eukaryota
- Kingdom: Animalia
- Phylum: Arthropoda
- Class: Insecta
- Order: Lepidoptera
- Family: Papilionidae
- Genus: Battus
- Species: B. polydamas
- Subspecies: †B. p. antiquus

Trinomial name
- †Battus polydamas antiquus (Rothschild & Jordan, 1906)

= Battus polydamas antiquus =

Extinct subspecies of butterfly

Battus polydamas antiquus is an extinct subspecies of the Polydamas swallowtail within the butterfly family Papilionidae. It is only known by a drawing from 1770 by British entomologist Dru Drury. It was endemic to Antigua.

== Taxonomy ==
There are over 20 Battus polydamas subspecies. While many are considered rare, B. p. antiquus is the only subspecies currently listed as extinct. Dru Drury received his butterflies from a variety of sources during a period of history when cartography was not precise. There exists, to those who have examined his three-volume work Illustrations of Natural History, a plethora of errors in his taxonomy. Such errors may indicate that B. p. antiquus never existed at all, though this is disputed.

== Description ==
Drury's illustration depicts a male. The ground color of the forewings and hindwings is black. The upperside of the forewings consists of a row of eight green spots. The upper four spots are small. The sixth one is the biggest. The row of spots on the hindwing is narrower.
