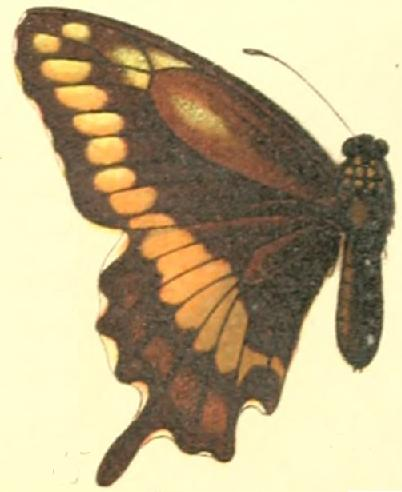

Conservation status
- Vulnerable (IUCN 2.3)

Scientific classification
- Kingdom: Animalia
- Phylum: Arthropoda
- Clade: Pancrustacea
- Class: Insecta
- Order: Lepidoptera
- Family: Papilionidae
- Genus: Battus
- Species: B. zetides

Binomial name
- Battus zetides (Munroe, 1971)

= Battus zetides =

Zetides swallowtail

Species of butterfly

Battus zetides, the zetides swallowtail, is a species of butterfly in the family Papilionidae and is found in Haiti and the Dominican Republic.

Battus zetides has on the upper surface of both wings a yellowish band, and on the under surface of the hindwing a silver band.

Known only from high elevations in Haiti and the Dominican Republic. Said to be "locally common under the right conditions and at the right times of year" but regarded also as a rare species. It is represented in few collections and specimens are sold at high prices.

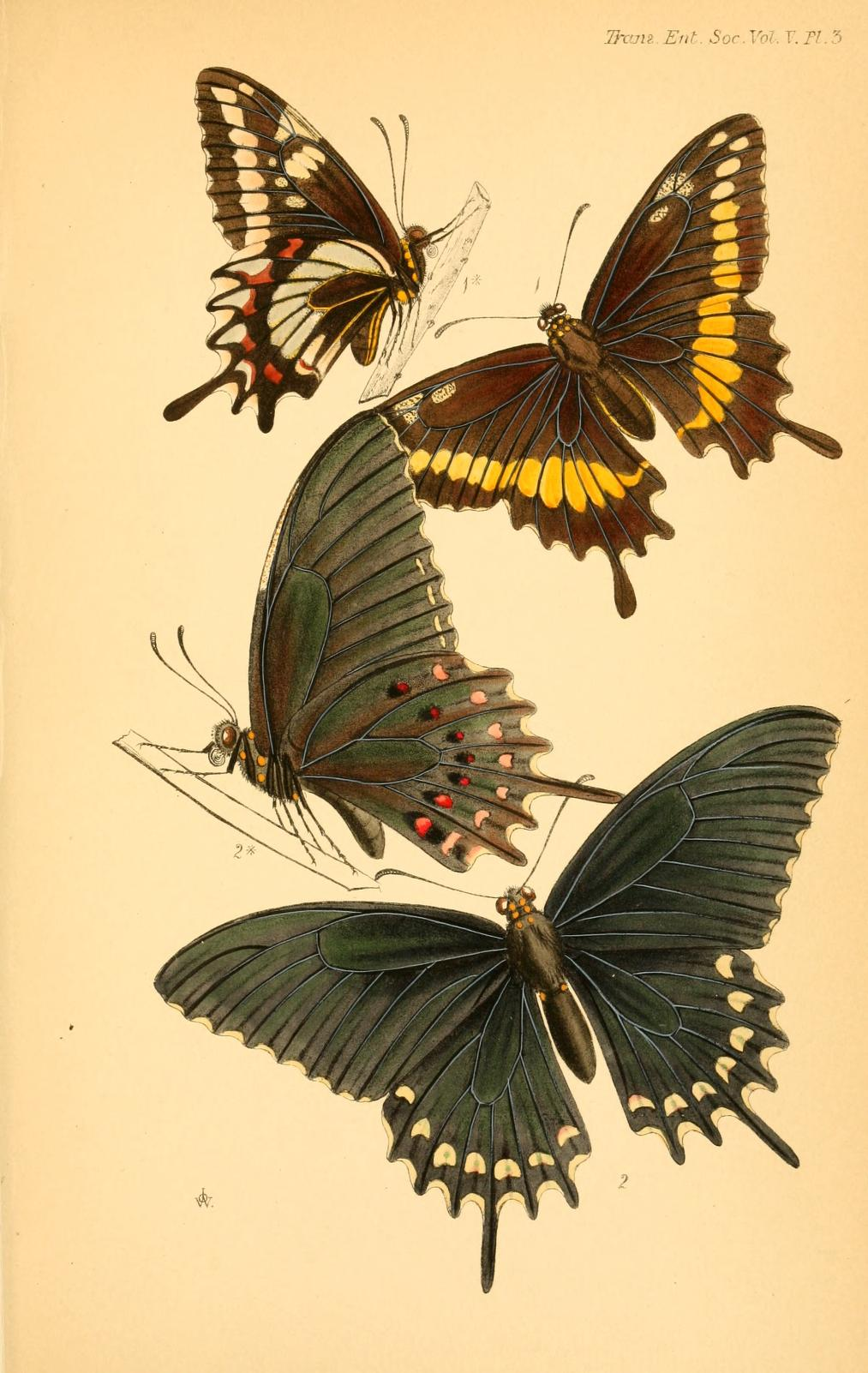
Top two insects

Originally described as zetes (Westwood, 1847) as the common name suggests. This name had already been used by Carl Linnaeus for Papilio zetes Linnaeus, 1758 and had to be replaced as it was a junior homonym.

== Sources ==
- Lewis, H. L., 1974 Butterflies of the World ISBN 0-245-52097-X Page 23, figure 5 (as zetes)
- Edwin Möhn, 2002 Schmetterlinge der Erde, Butterflies of the World Part V (5), Papilionidae II:Battus. Edited by Erich Bauer and Thomas Frankenbach Keltern : Goecke & Evers; Canterbury : Hillside Books.ISBN 978-3-931374-70-9 Illustrates and identifies 14 species and 49 subspecies. Plate 1, figures 1–4.
