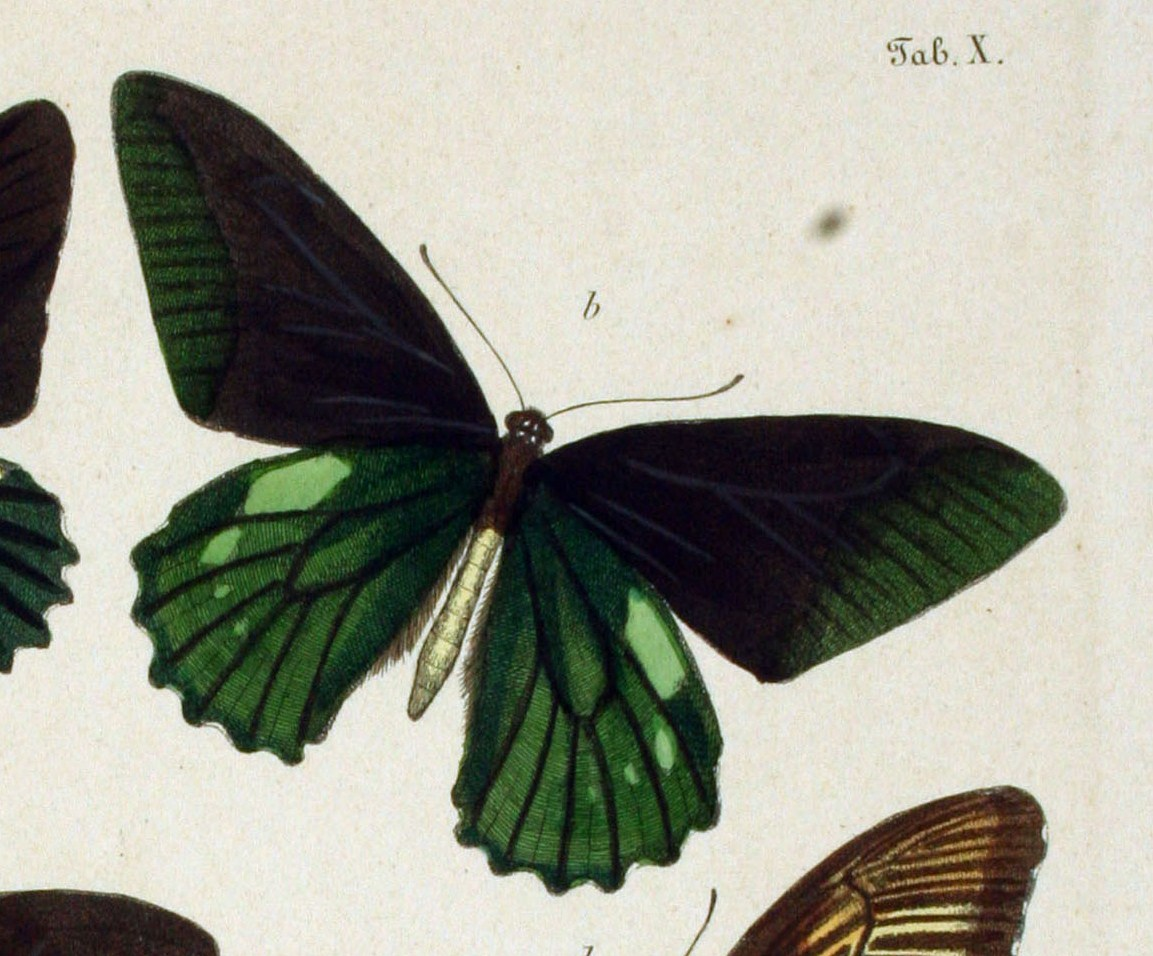
- Illustration from the Felders' Novara Expedition Atlas, male, dorsal view
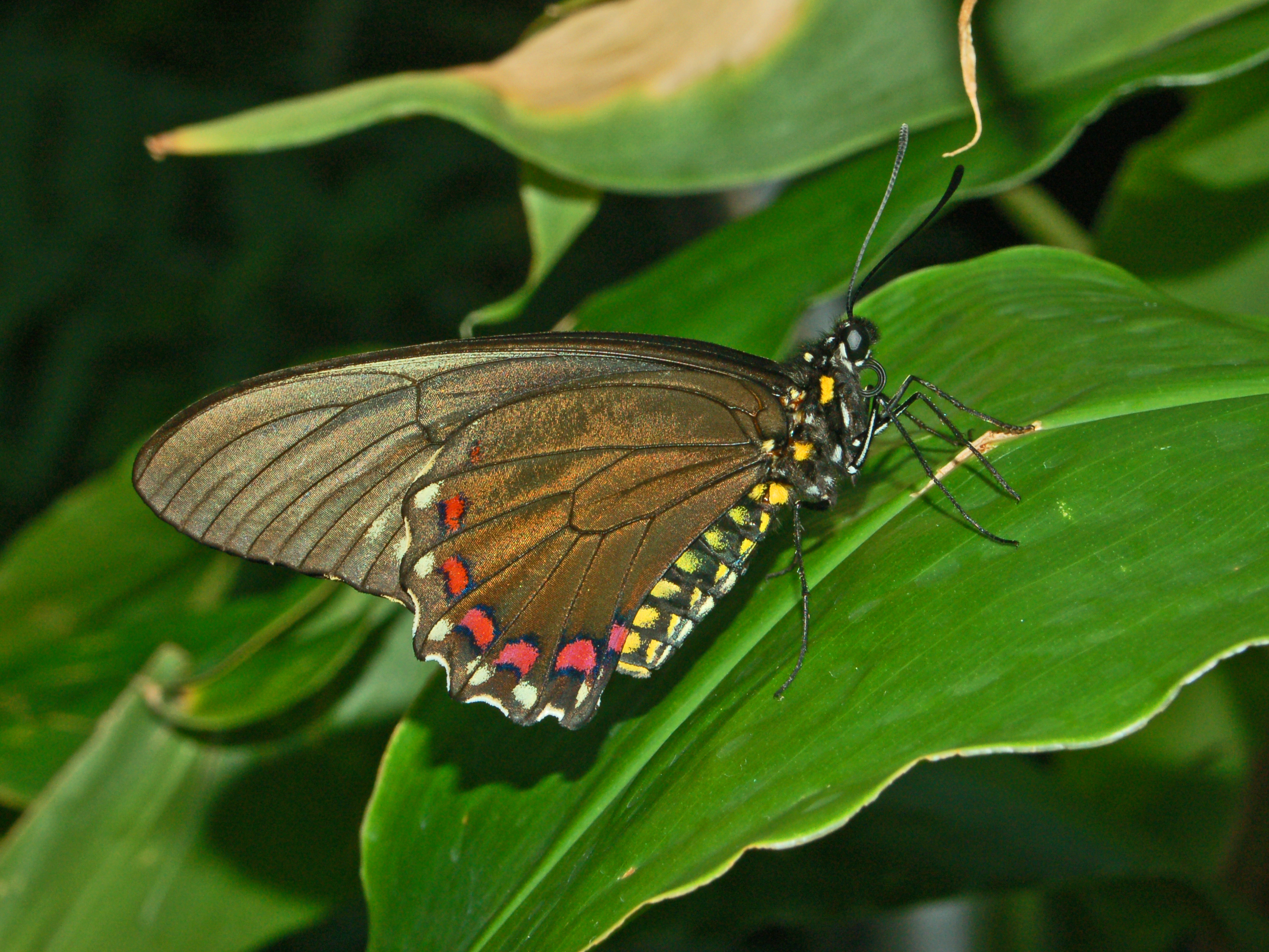
- Live Battus ingenuus, female, ventral view

Conservation status
- Least Concern (IUCN 3.1)

Scientific classification
- Kingdom: Animalia
- Phylum: Arthropoda
- Clade: Pancrustacea
- Class: Insecta
- Order: Lepidoptera
- Family: Papilionidae
- Genus: Battus
- Species: B. ingenuus

Binomial name
- Battus ingenuus (Dyar, 1907)

Synonyms
- Papilio ingenuus Dyar, 1907; Papilio latinus C. Felder & R. Felder, 1861 preocc. (not Donovan, 1805); Papilio belus f. chrysomaculatus Niepelt, 1915; Papilio belus camposia Schaus, 1928; Papilio belus chalceus f. ochracea Vázquez, 1957

= Battus ingenuus =

Dyar's swallowtail

Species of butterfly

Battus ingenuus, the Dyar's swallowtail or confused swallowtail, is a species of butterfly in the family Papilionidae.

== Description ==
Battus ingenuus has a wingspan of about 82–95 millimetres (3.2–3.7 in). The uppersides of the wings are basically black with greenish reflections and pale green patches on the hindwings, while the undersides are mainly brownish, with red and white spots on the edges of the hindwings. The body is blackish, with yellow spots on the sides of the thorax and the abdomen and a few white spots on the underside of the abdomen. Males have a pale yellowish-greenish upper abdomen.

== Distribution ==
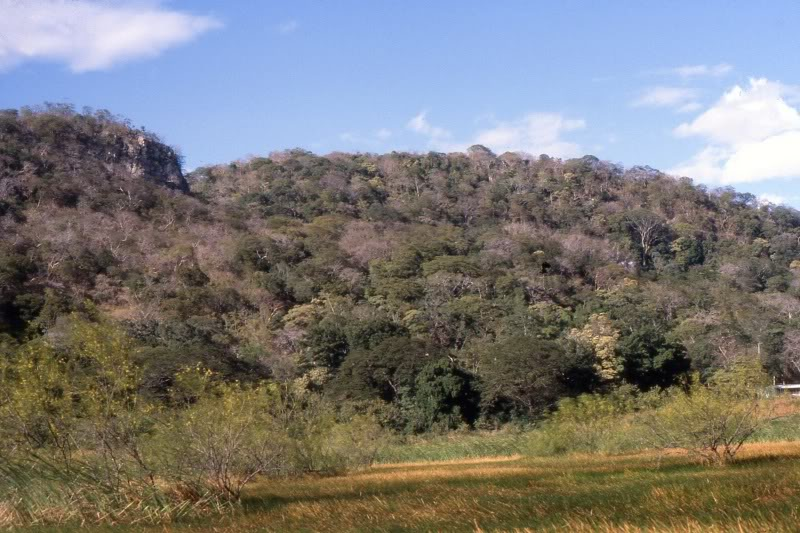
Habitat of Battus ingenuus in tropical deciduous forest - Guanacaste Province, Palo Verde, Costa Rica.

Battus ingenuus is present from southeastern Mexico to eastern Venezuela (Belize, Colombia, Costa Rica, Ecuador, El Salvador, Honduras, Nicaragua, Panama, Peru and Trinidad).

== Habitat ==
Battus ingenuus can be found from low elevations up to moderate elevations in the Andes, at about 900 metres (3,000 ft) above sea level. In monsoonal areas of Costa Rica, the habitat is known as tropical deciduous forest, where most of the trees lose their leaves at the end of the dry season.

== Life cycle ==
The larvae feed on Aristolochia constricta. As the caterpillars feed off these poisonous pipevines, the insects become poisonous themselves, tasting very bad to birds.
