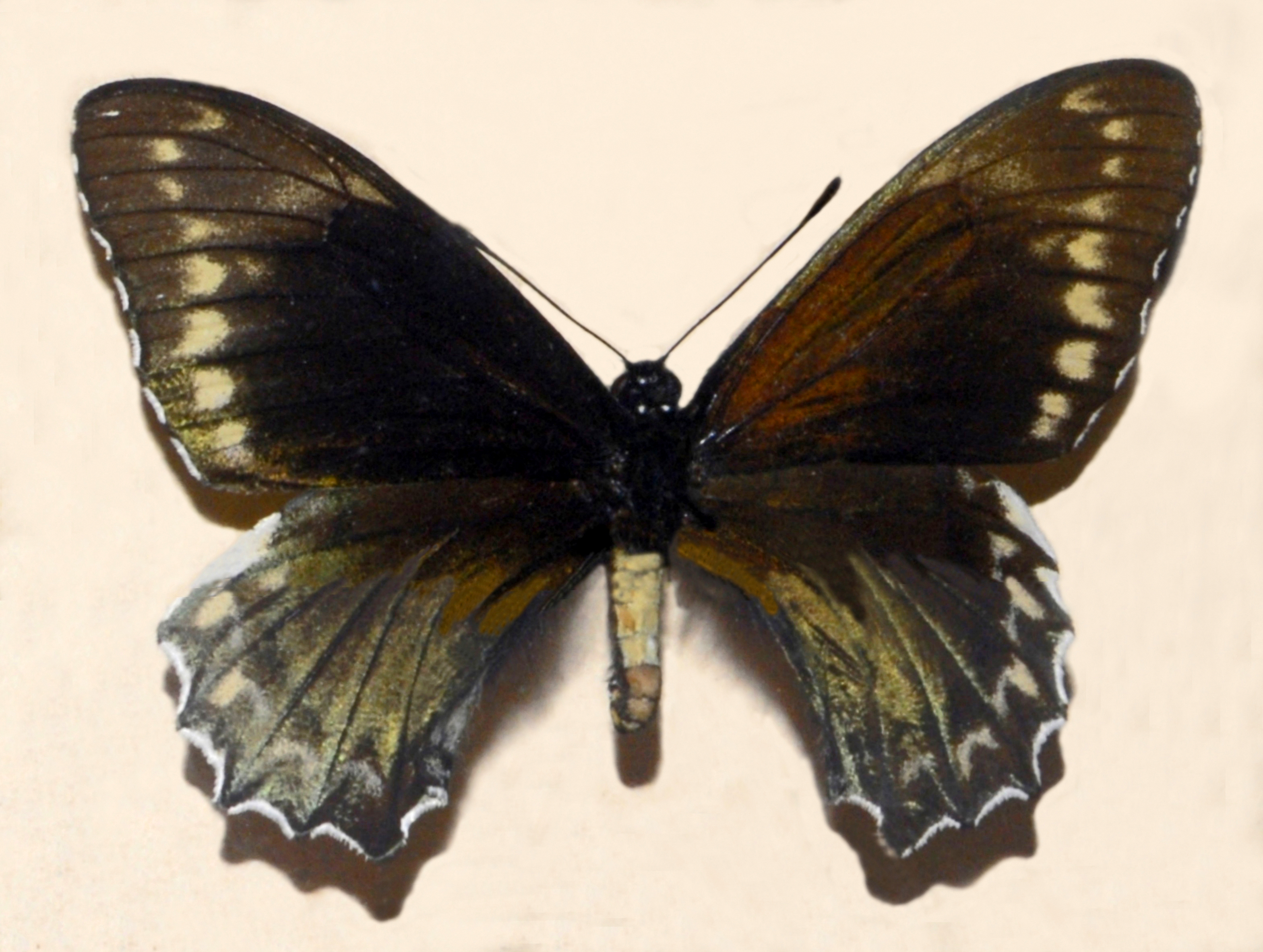
- Mounted specimen on display at Museo di Scienze Naturali Enrico Caffi, Bergamo

Scientific classification
- Kingdom: Animalia
- Phylum: Arthropoda
- Clade: Pancrustacea
- Class: Insecta
- Order: Lepidoptera
- Family: Papilionidae
- Genus: Battus
- Species: B. madyes

Binomial name
- Battus madyes (Doubleday, 1846)

Synonyms
- Papilio madyes Doubleday, 1846; Battus madyas; Papilio madyes crispus Rothschild & Jordan, 1906

= Battus madyes =

Madyes swallowtail

Species of butterfly

Battus madyes, the Madyes swallowtail, is a species of butterfly from the family Papilionidae.

== Description ==
Battus madyes has a wingspan reaching about 70 millimetres (2.8 in). The body is black, while the abdomen of the male is yellowish white above. The dorsal side of the wings is black or dark brown with a submarginal line of yellowish markings. The under surface of the hindwings is greenish yellow, with red or yellow submarginal spots. The outer edge of the hindwings is scalloped. The host plants of its caterpillars are Aristolochia species.

== Distribution and habitat ==
This species can ben found in Argentina, Bolivia, Ecuador and Peru. It lives in the Andes between 1000and 2500 m above sea level.

== Subspecies ==
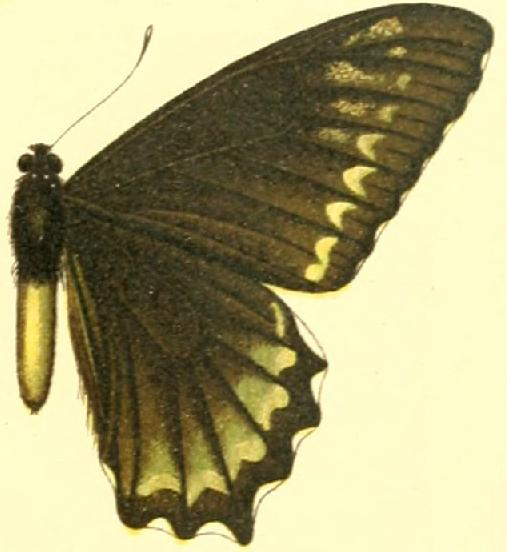
Illustration of B. m. philetas from The Macrolepidoptera of the World. Vol. 5.

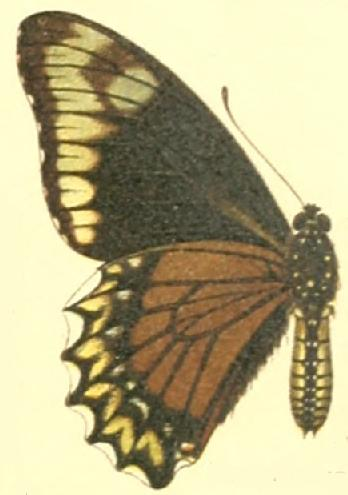
Illustration of B. m. tucumanus from The Macrolepidoptera of the World. Vol. 5.

- Battus madyes madyes (Bolivia) Möhn, 1999, Butterflies of the World 5: 6, plate 8, figures 1–2, plate 18, figure 6. Under surface of the hindwing streaked with black on the veins.
- Battus madyes chlorodamas (Guenée, 1872) (eastern Peru) Möhn, 1999, Butterflies of the World 5: 6, plate 7, figures 5–6, plate 18, figure 5. The commonest form in collections. Bands of spots on the upper surface broad, on the forewing white (females) or yellow (males). Smart The Illustrated Encyclopedia of the Butterfly World page 159 figure 20, underside.
- Battus madyes montebanus (Dyar, 1913) (Peru) Möhn, 1999, Butterflies of the World 5: 6, plate 7, figure 8.
- Battus madyes plinius (Weymer, 1890) (northern Peru) Möhn, 1999, Butterflies of the World 5: 6, plate 7, figures 3–4, plate 18, figures 3–4. Forewing above with four small spots. Hindwing beneath ochre yellow; submarginal spots small.
- Battus madyes tucumanus (Rothschild & Jordan, 1906) (north-western Argentina) Möhn, 1999, Butterflies of the World 5: 6, plate 8, figures 3–4.Like madyes, but the apex of the forewing beneath not washed over with yellow; hindwing beneath smoky brown.
- Battus madyes adloni (Ehrmann, 1926) (central Ecuador) Möhn, 1999, Butterflies of the World 5: 5, back, figure 5–6; Möhn, 1999, Butterflies of the World 8: 4, plate 4, figure 4.
- Battus madyes philetas (Hewitson, 1869) (southern Ecuador) Möhn, 1999, Butterflies of the World 8: 4, plate 4, figures 5–6. Smart The Illustrated Encyclopedia of the Butterfly World page 158 fig. 13, underside.
- Battus madyes magnimacula (Joicey & Talbot, 1925) (northern Peru) Möhn, 1999, Butterflies of the World 5: 6, plate 7, figure 7.
- Battus madyes lojaensis Möhn, 1999 (southern Ecuador) Möhn, 1999, Butterflies of the World 5: 5, plate 7, figures 1–2, plate 18, figures 1–2
- Battus madyes buechei Lamas, 1998 (central Peru)Möhn, 1999, Butterflies of the World 5: 6, back, figures 3–4
- Battus madyes callangaensis Möhn, 2001 (Peru) Möhn, 1999, Butterflies of the World 5: 6 as montebanus Spots on the upper surface much smaller than in chlorodamas.
- Battus madyes frankenbachi Möhn, 2001 (Peru)
