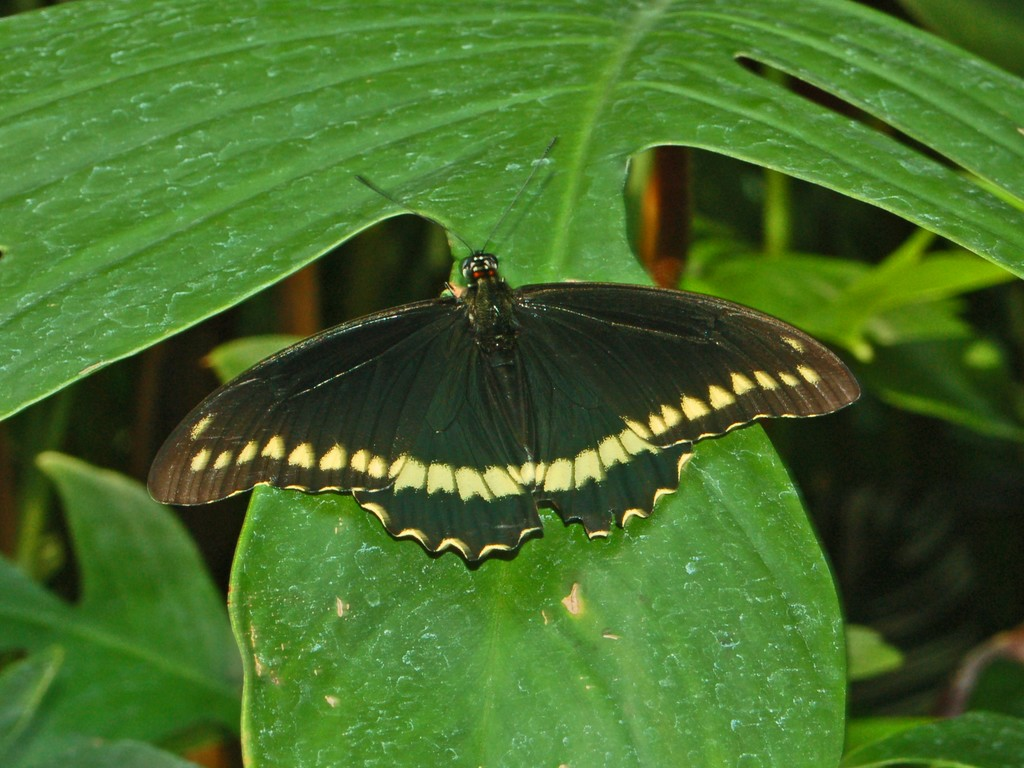

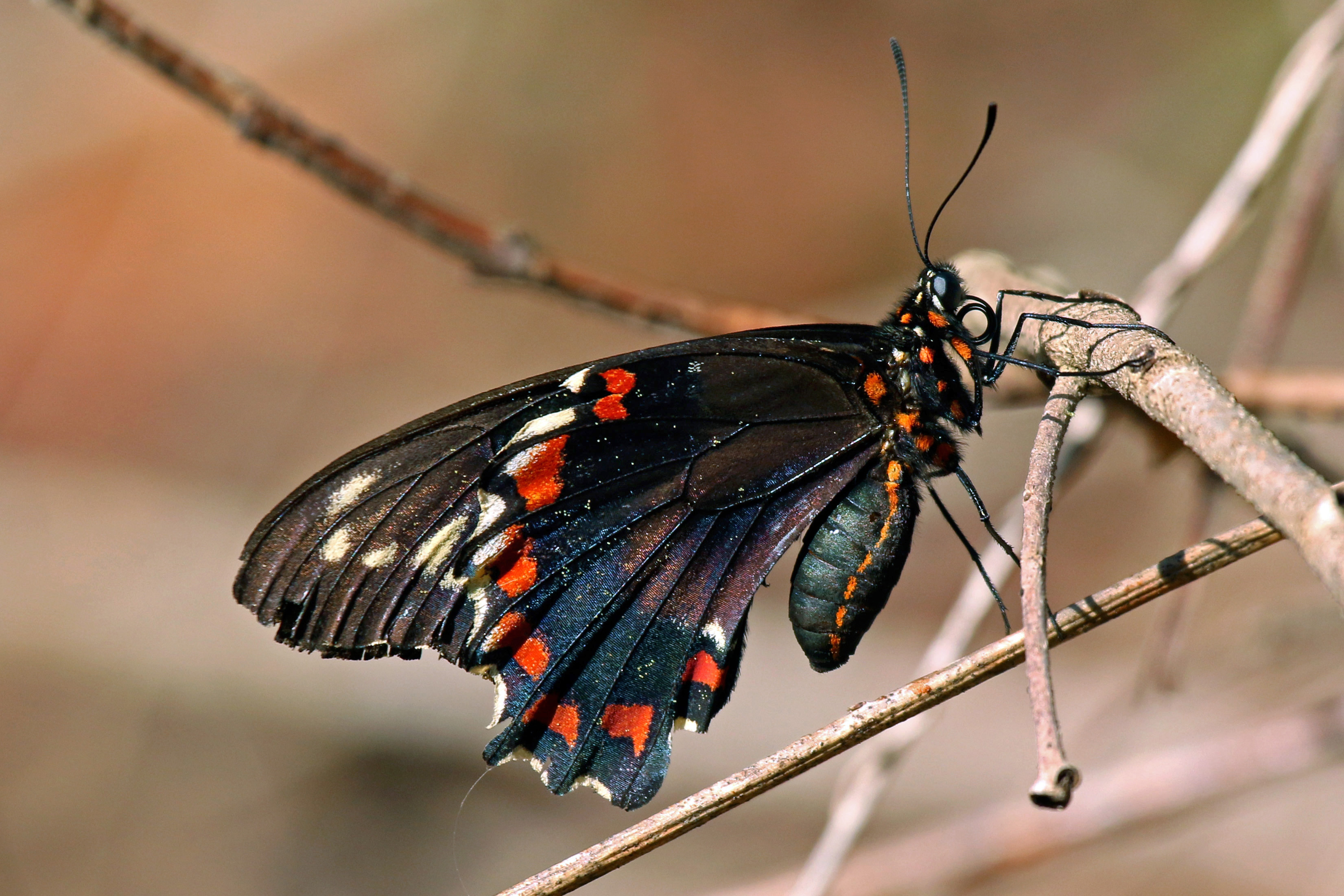
- B. p. jamaicensis

Conservation status
- Least Concern (IUCN 3.1)

- Secure (NatureServe)

Scientific classification
- Kingdom: Animalia
- Phylum: Arthropoda
- Clade: Pancrustacea
- Class: Insecta
- Order: Lepidoptera
- Family: Papilionidae
- Genus: Battus
- Species: B. polydamas

Binomial name
- Battus polydamas (Linnaeus, 1758)

Synonyms
- Papilio polydamas Linnaeus

= Battus polydamas =

Species of butterfly

Battus polydamas, also known as the gold rim swallowtail, the Polydamas swallowtail or the tailless swallowtail, is a species of butterfly in the family Papilionidae. The species was first described by Carl Linnaeus in his 10th edition of Systema Naturae, published in 1758. Adults generally have black wings with yellow markings while the larval stage is mainly about consuming acids from toxic plants to make themselves unpalatable to predators. They are mainly found in the Neotropical region, and in many of the Caribbean islands.

== Distribution and habitat ==
The Polydamas swallowtail is widespread in the Neotropical realm throughout Mexico, Central and South America, the Caribbean, and in southern United States, including Texas and Florida. It also inhabits many Caribbean islands such as Jamaica, Cuba, Puerto Rico, Haiti and the Dominican Republic. Within this broad range, B. polydamas prefers habitats where they can access its larval host plants, particularly species in the genus Aristolochia. However, it is most often found in open woodlands, along the edges of forests, or abandoned fields, and occasionally in gardens with their preferable host plants.

== Morphology ==
The wingspan of an adult B. Polydamas is 84 to 110 mm without the tail. The top of the wings are black with a broad submarginal band formed by large yellow spots. The undersides of the forewings have the same pattern, while the hindwings have a submarginal row of red lunules. This butterfly flies from April to November in three generations in the north of its range, throughout the year in several generations in the tropics.

Life cycle

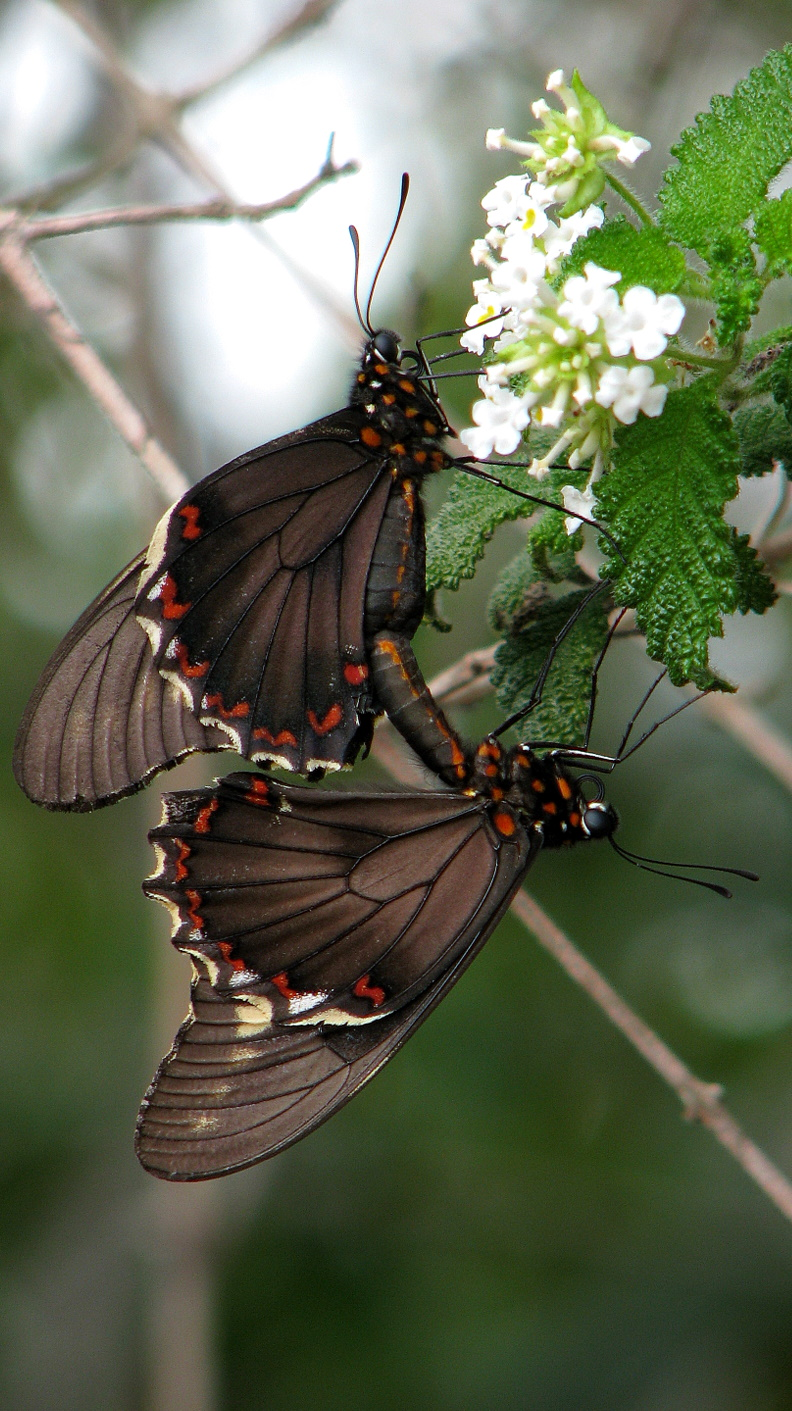
Mating

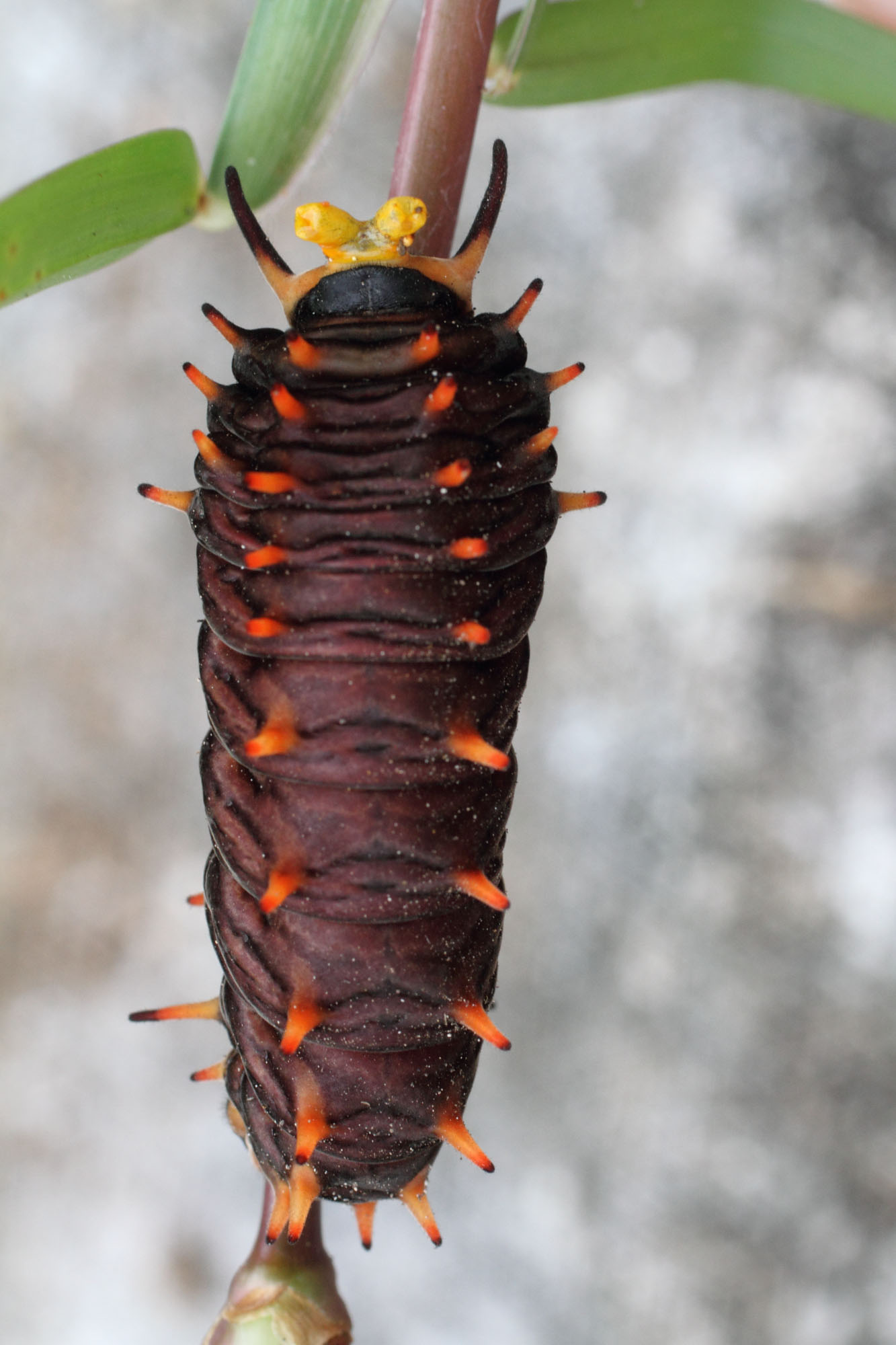
Larva

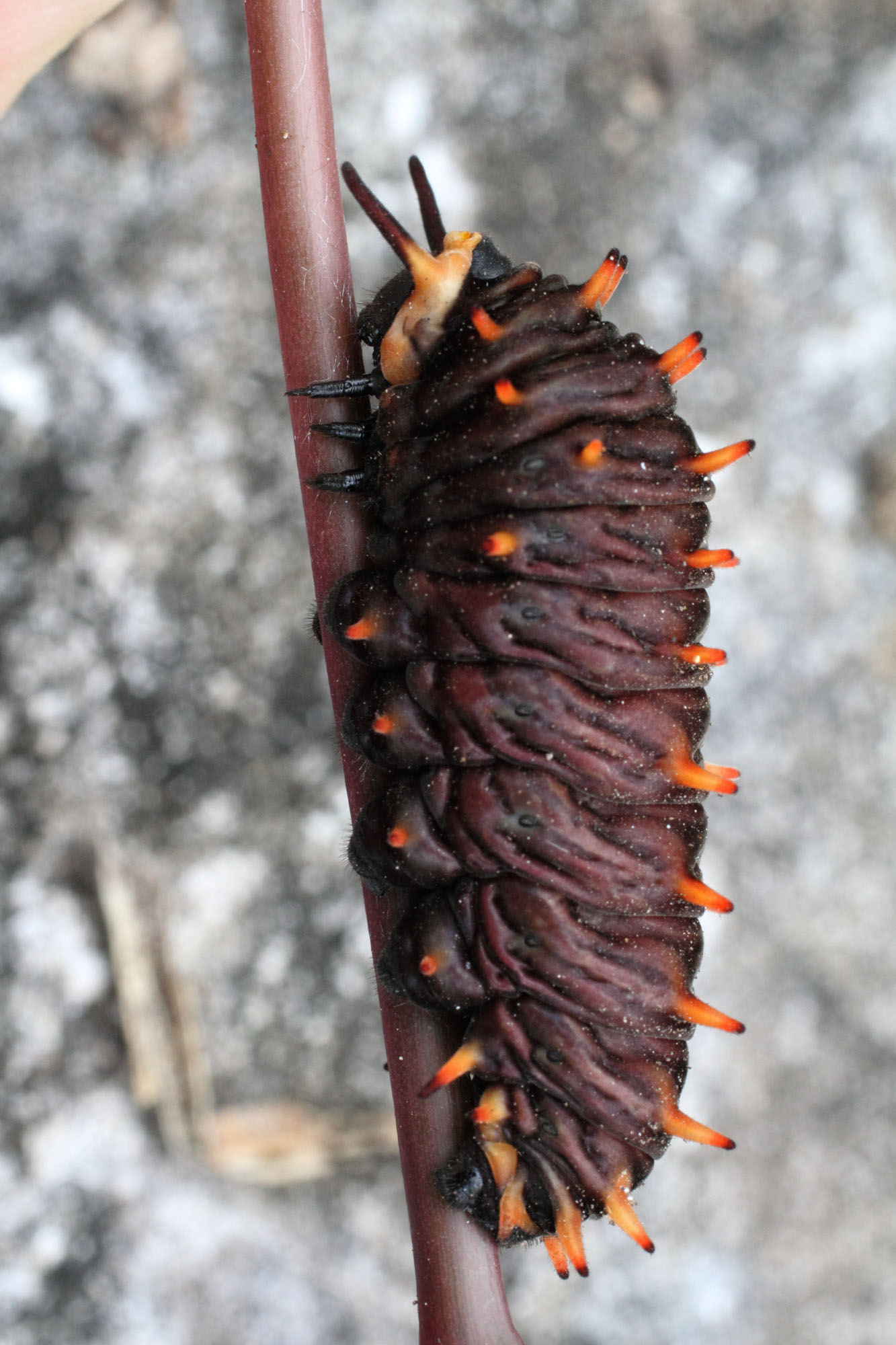
Larva

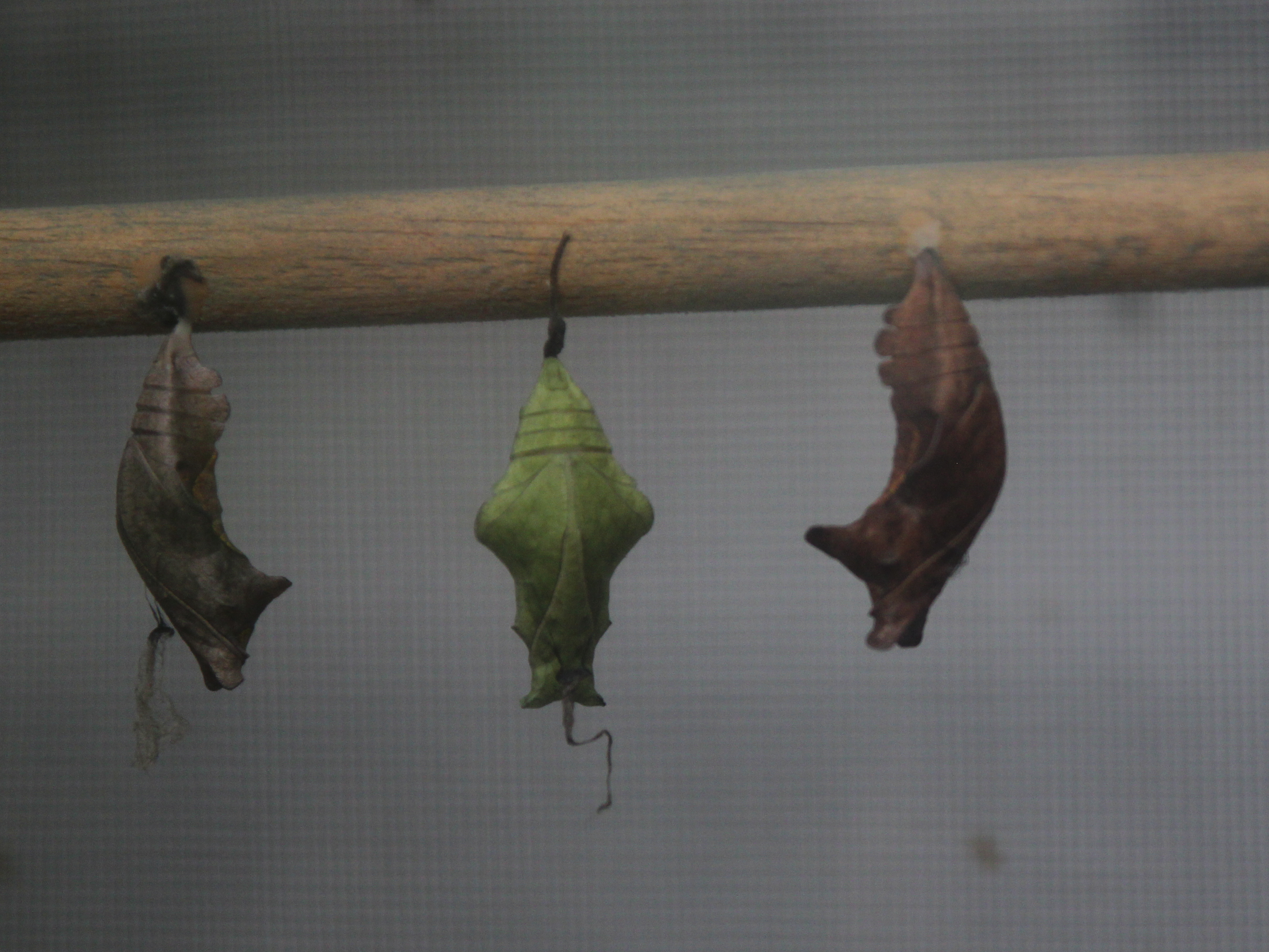
Pupa

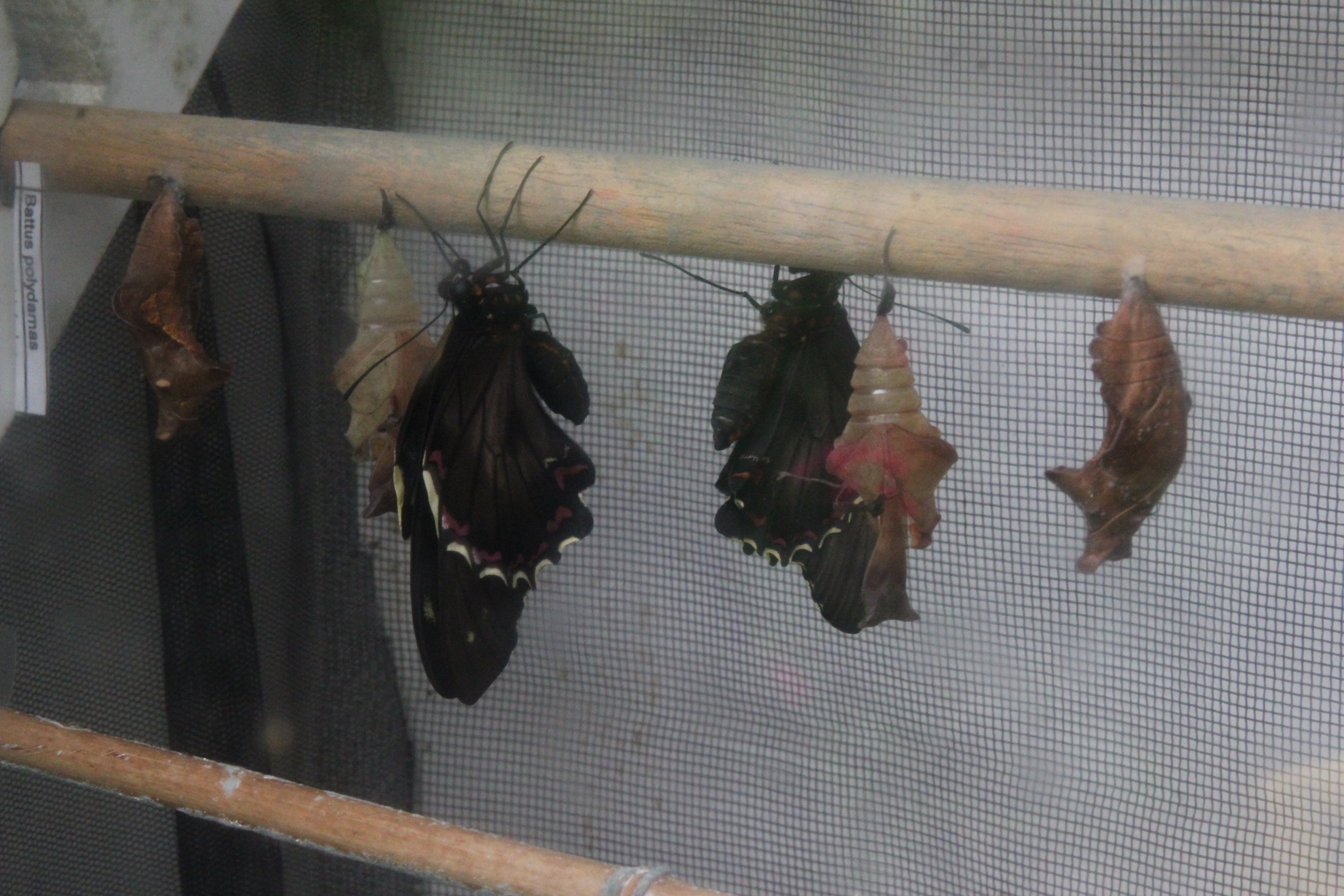
Emerging from pupa

== Chemical defense in larvae ==
Swallowtail butterflies build their chemical defense by feeding on toxic host plants that make them distasteful to predators, ultimately increasing their fitness. For instance, the larvae of B. polydamas feed exclusively on plants of Aristolochia species, containing aristolochic acids (AA). Throughout their larval development, they consume and accumulate aristolochic acids in their body and integument. And the amount of AA content they can contain increases with the size of larvae.

== Subspecies ==
The species is divided into the following subspecies:

- †B. p. antiquus (Rothschild & Jordan, 1906) – Antigua (extinct)
- B. p. archidamas (Boisduval, 1836) – Chile
- B. p. atahualpa Racheli & Pischedda, 1987 – Peru
- B. p. cebriones (Dalman, 1823) - Martinique
- B. p. christopheranus (Hall, 1936) - Saint Kitts and Nevis, Montserrat (possibly extinct)
- B. p. cubensis (Dufrane, 1946) – Cuba (including Isla de la Juventud), Cayman Islands (Grand Cayman)
- B. p. dominicus (Rothschild & Jordan, 1906) – Dominica
- B. p. grenadensis (Hall, 1930) - Grenada, possibly southern Grenadines
- B. p. jamaicensis (Rothschild & Jordan, 1906) – Jamaica
- B. p. lucayus (Rothschild & Jordan, 1906) – Florida, Bahamas
- B. p. lucianus (Rothschild & Jordan, 1906) – St. Lucia (possibly extinct)
- B. p. neodamas (Lucas, 1852) – Guadeloupe
- B. p. peruanus (Fuchs, 1954) – Peru
- B. p. polycrates (Hopffer, 1865) – Hispaniola (Haiti and the Dominican Republic)
- B. p. polydamas (Linnaeus, 1758) – tropical Central and South America
- B. p. psittacus (Molina, 1782) – Chile, Argentina
- B. p. renani Lamas, 1998 – Peru
- B. p. streckerianus (Honrath, 1884) – Peru
- B. p. thyamus (Rothschild & Jordan, 1906) – Puerto Rico (including Culebra), Virgin Islands
- B. p. vincentius (Rothschild & Jordan, 1906) - Saint Vincent and the Grenadines
- B. p. weyrauchi Lamas, 1998 – Peru
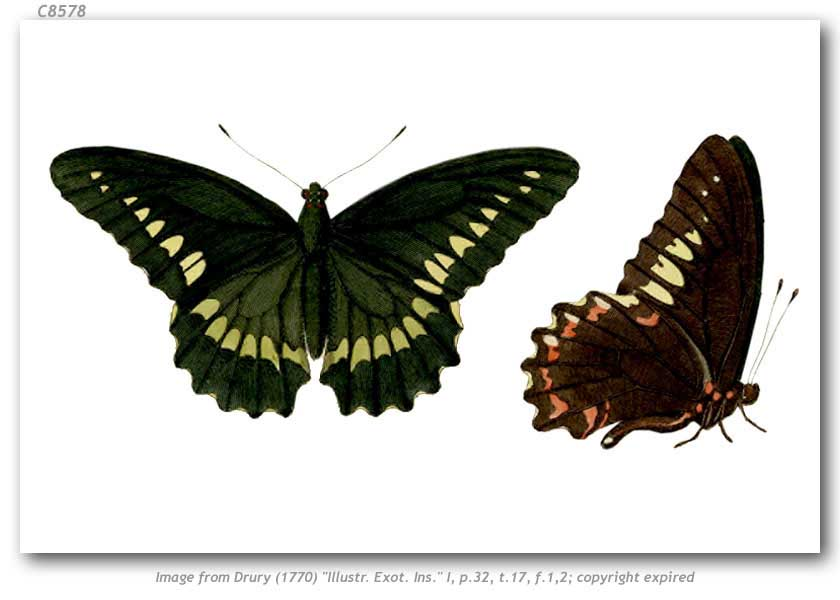
  †B. p. antiquus, extinct subspecies
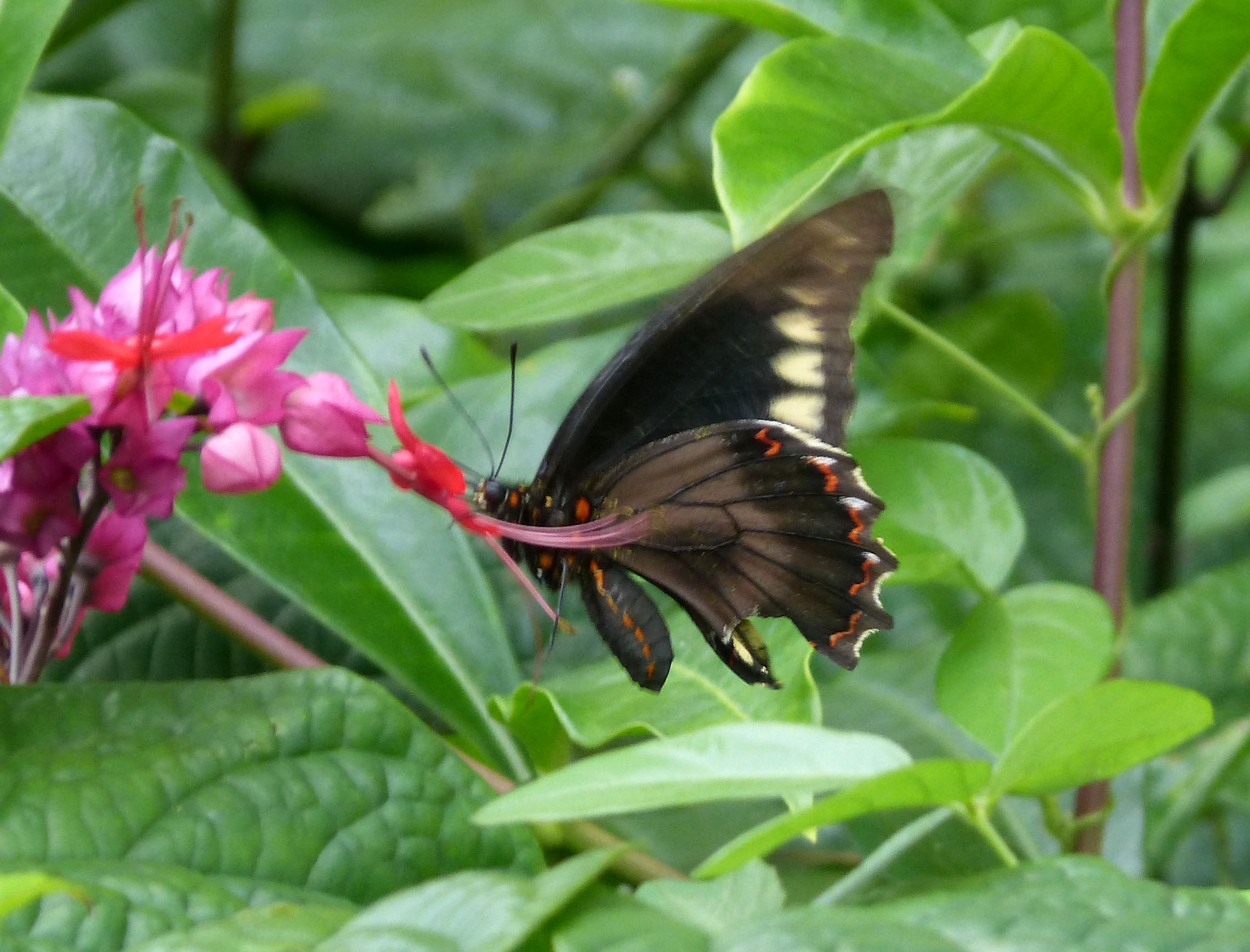
  B. p. cubensis, Cuba
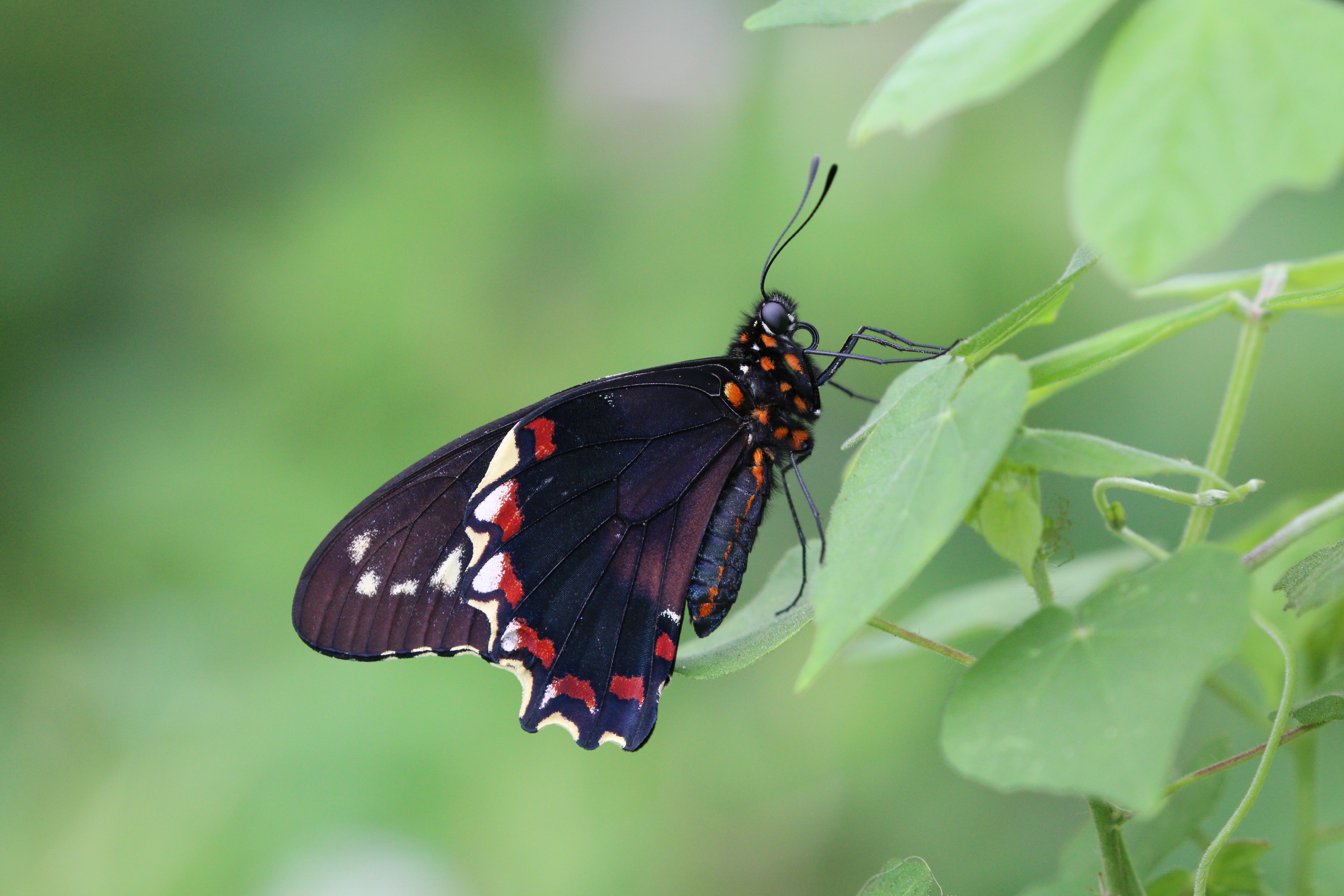
  B. p. jamaicensis, Jamaica
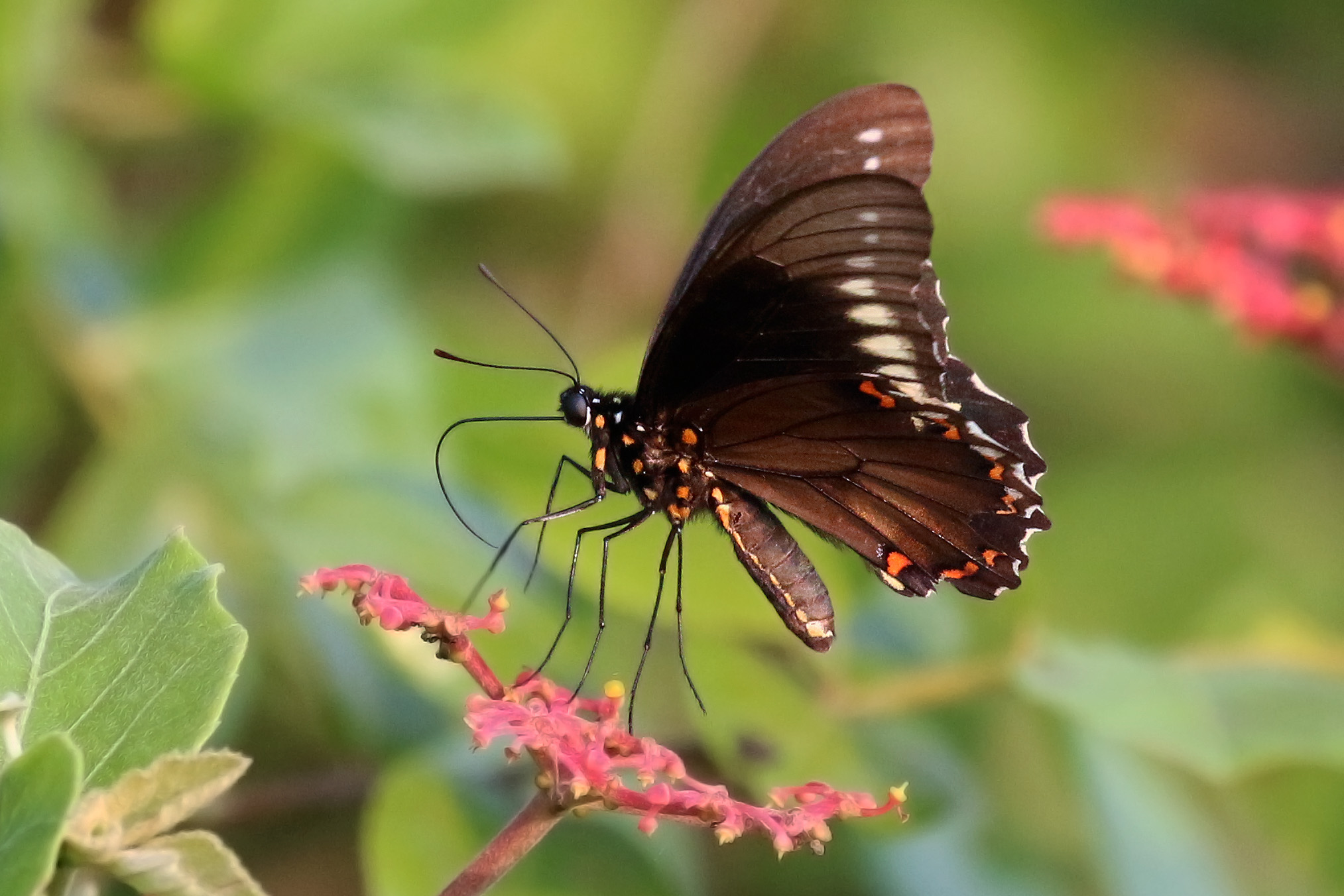
  B. p. polydamas, Southern Amazon, Brazil
