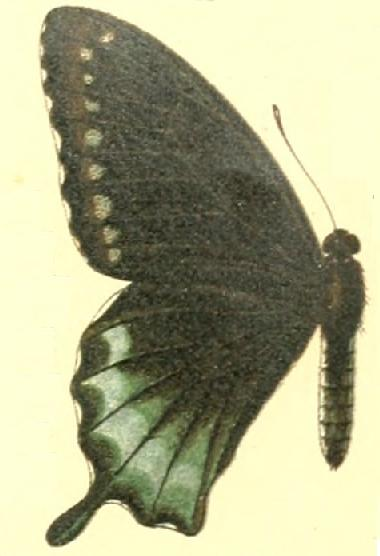

Scientific classification
- Kingdom: Animalia
- Phylum: Arthropoda
- Clade: Pancrustacea
- Class: Insecta
- Order: Lepidoptera
- Family: Papilionidae
- Genus: Battus
- Species: B. devilliersii

Binomial name
- Battus devilliersii (Godart, 1823)

Synonyms
- Papilio devilliersii Godart, 1823; Battus devilliers; Battus (Battus) devilliersi Möhn, 1999

= Battus devilliersii =

Species of butterfly

Battus devilliersii is a species of butterfly from the family Papilionidae that is found in Cuba and the Bahamas.

== Description ==
It has tails on both hindwings. The forewings have a submarginal row of white spots. The hindwing on the upper surface has a submarginal band, and on the underside with one or more silver spots.

== Description from Seitz ==
P. devilliers Godt. (6a). Hitherto known with certainty only from Cuba; the older authors assigned it to Florida also, which is perhaps due to an error. Tailed. Forewing with a submarginal row of white spots; hind-wing on the upper surface with a submarginal band, and on the under with one or more silver spots.

== Biology ==
The larvae feed on Aristolochia elegans.
