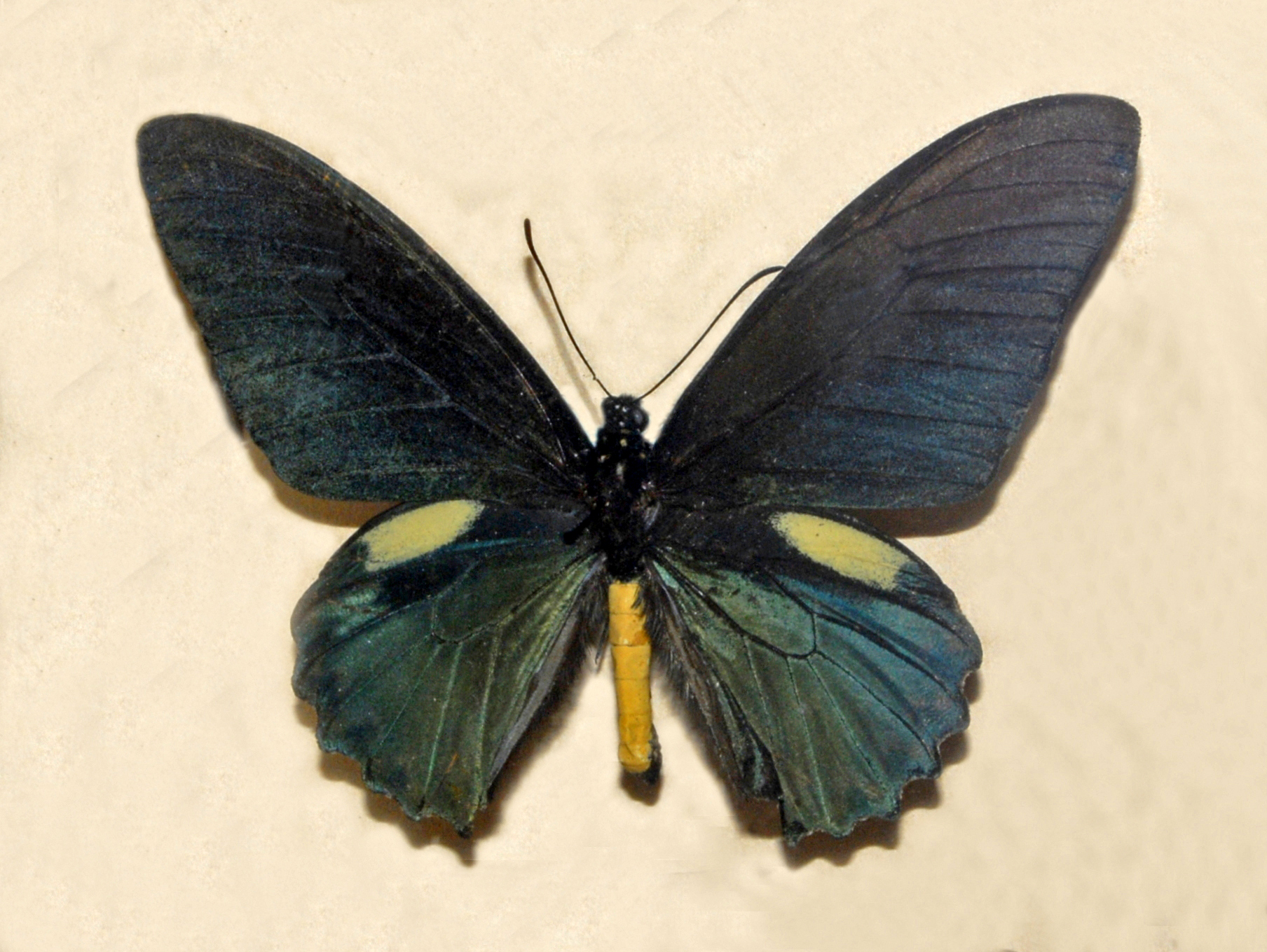
- Mounted specimen of male - on display at Museo di Scienze Naturali Enrico Caffi, Bergamo

Scientific classification
- Kingdom: Animalia
- Phylum: Arthropoda
- Clade: Pancrustacea
- Class: Insecta
- Order: Lepidoptera
- Family: Papilionidae
- Genus: Battus
- Species: B. belus

Binomial name
- Battus belus (Cramer, 1777)

Synonyms
- Papilio belus Cramer, 1777; Papilio numitor Cramer, [1777]; Papilio amulius Esper, 1792; Papilio caburi Kaye, 1906; Papilio heteropterus Zikán, 1937; Papilio belus chalceus Rothschild & Jordan, 1906

= Battus belus =

Belus swallowtail

Species of butterfly

Battus belus, the Belus swallowtail is a species of butterfly from the family Papilionidae that is found in Brazil, Colombia, Guatemala, Peru and Venezuela.

== Description ==
Battus belus is a large Butterfly with a wingspan of 80 to 100 mm. The wings are without a tail. The upperside is black widely suffused with structural green or blue green, with variable white patches and bands. The underside is pearl sheened brown with a submarginal row of small white dots and big red chevrons. The caterpillars are brown marked with black.

"Forewing of the male without white spots on the upper surface; hindwing with one to seven white spots on the disc, the first of which is always large; the forewing of the female is similar to that of the male or it has a large pale yellow area. Hindwing beneath in both sexes with white dots outside the red submarginal spots".

== Subspecies ==
- Battus belus belus (Guyanas, Surinam) In the male the hindwing usually has only one white spot, yet specimens occur which have a row of small spots in the disc. Two forms of the female are known; female-f. belus Cr. is similar to the male and has on the hindwing either only one spot or a complete row; in ab. amulius Esp. the spots on the undersurface of the hindwing are yellow. The second variety of the female is female-f. amazonis R. and J.; it has a yellow area on the forewing like the female-f. varus of the subspecies varus Koll. See also Möhn, 1999, Butterflies of the World 5: 8, plate 12, figures 1–2.
- Battus belus varus (Kollar, 1850) (Guatemala to Venezuela, Colombia, Peru, Brazil: Amazonas) Hindwing with a band of spots diminishing in width posteriorly. The female occurs in two forms. The common form is female-f. latinus Fldr., it is similar to the male, but the forewing has some submarginal spots and the first spot of the band of the hindwing is about as large as the second. The very rare form with large yellowish area on the forewing, occupying the extremity of the cell and the adjacent part of the disc, is female-f varus Koll. See also Möhn, 1999, Butterflies of the World 5: 8, plates 12, figures 5–8, plate 14, figure 4, plate 20, figures 1–2
- Battus belus belemus (Bates, 1864) (Brazil: Pará, Amazonas) Has a straight band on the hindwing; only the form of the male similar to the female is known. See also Möhn, 1999, Butterflies of the World 5: 8, plate 12, figure 3
- Battus belus cochabamba (Weeks, 1901) (Bolivia, Peru) Hindwing usually with a broad straight macular band; sometimes the last five spots small, very rarely wanting. See also Möhn, 1999, Butterflies of the World 5: 8, plate 13, figures 1–8, plate 14, figures 1–3, plate 20, figures 3–4. Smart, 1976 The Illustrated Encyclopedia of the Butterfly World page 159 fig. 18
- Battus belus aureochloris Brown, 1994 (Brazil: Pará) See also Möhn, 1999, Butterflies of the World 5: 8, plate 12, figure 4
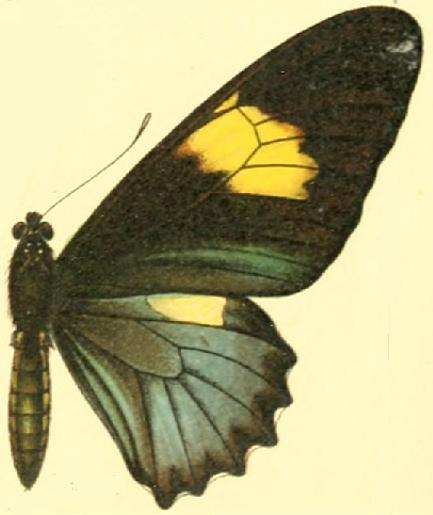
B. b. belus female-f. amazonis R. and J, which resembles the female of subspecies varus

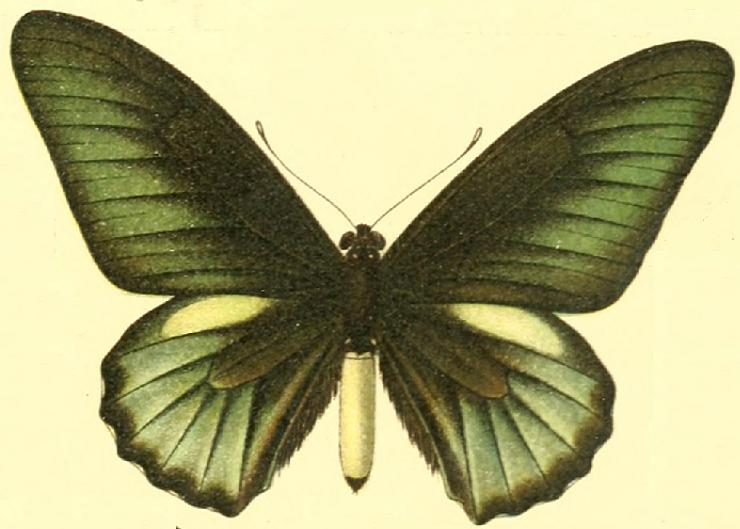
Male - illustration from The Macrolepidoptera of the World Vol. 5.

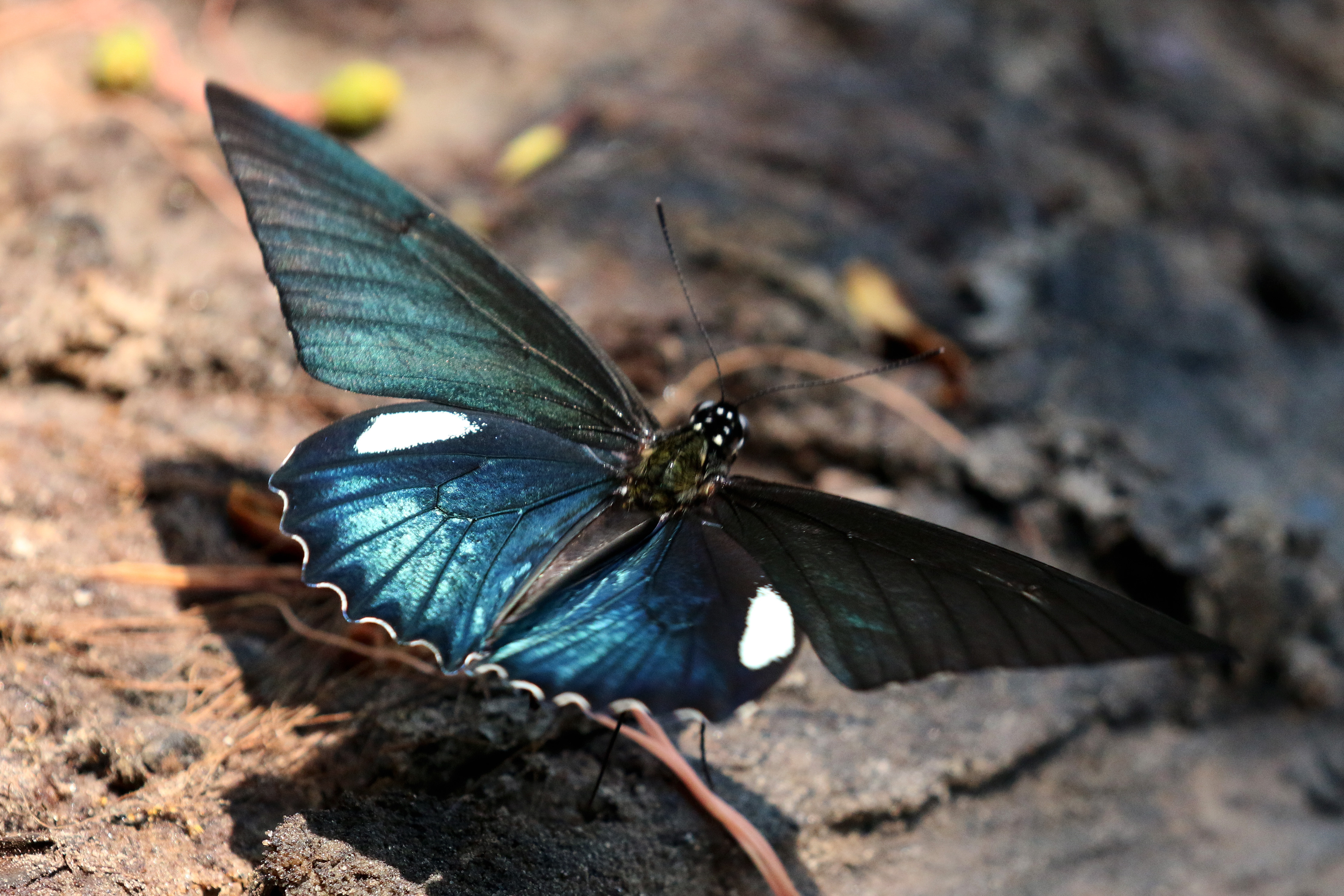
B. b. belus male
Cristalino River, Southern Amazon, Brazil

== Biology ==
Battus belus lives in the Amazon rainforest. The larvae feed on Aristolochia species. "The male is called by Bates a swift and bold flier; the female with yellow area on the forewing he found on flowers at the edge of the forest. The females are much more rarely caught than the males". (Jordan, 1907)

== Distribution ==
This species is widespread in the Neotropical realm.
