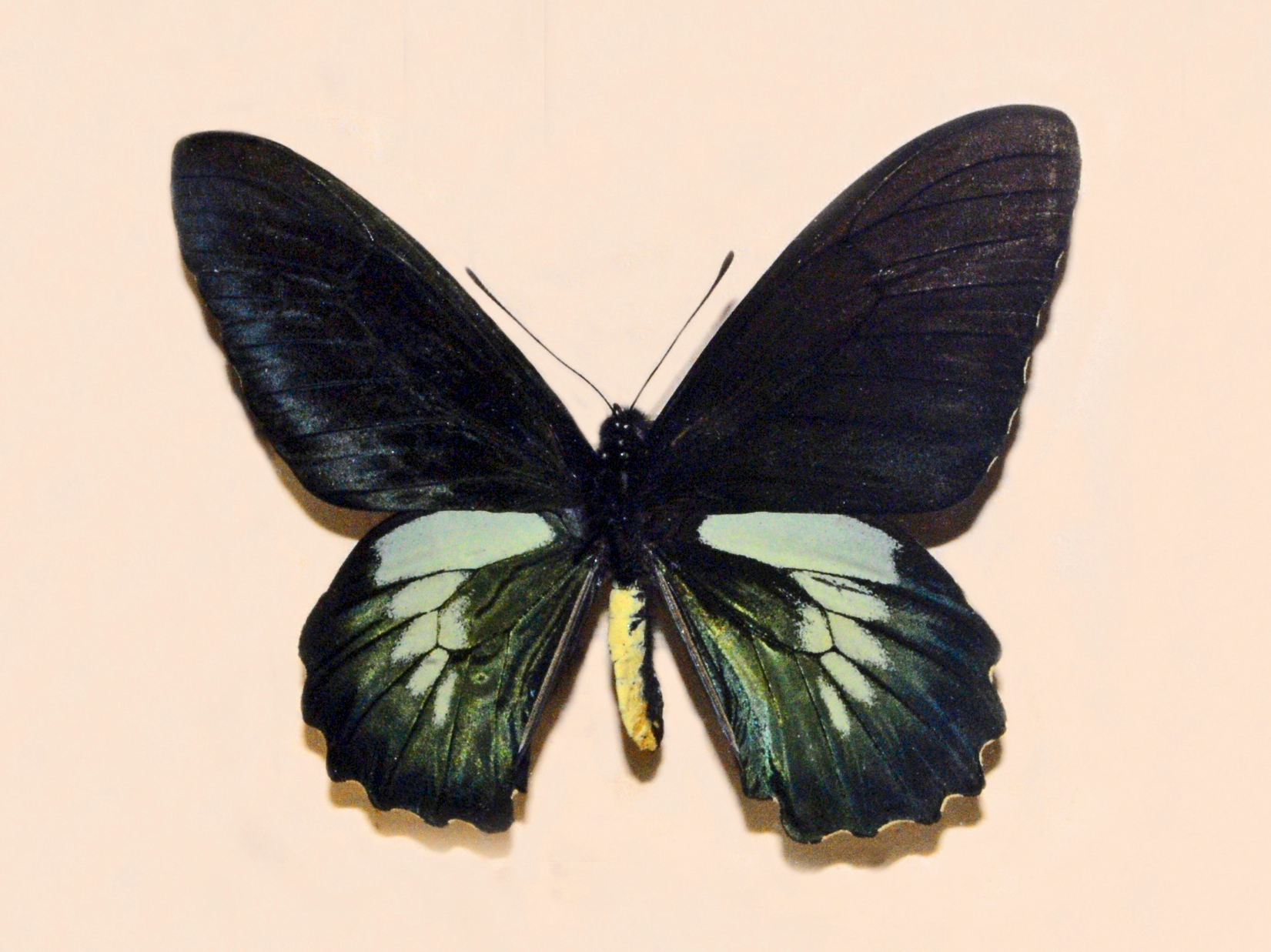
- Mounted specimen on display at Museo di Scienze Naturali Enrico Caffi, Bergamo

Scientific classification
- Kingdom: Animalia
- Phylum: Arthropoda
- Clade: Pancrustacea
- Class: Insecta
- Order: Lepidoptera
- Family: Papilionidae
- Genus: Battus
- Species: B. laodamas

Binomial name
- Battus laodamas (C. Felder & R. Felder, 1859)

Synonyms
- Papilio laodamas (C. Felder & R. Felder, 1859); Papilio chrysodamas (H.W. Bates, 1864); Papilio chromealus (Ehrmann, 1912); Papilio procas (Godman & Salvin, 1890) (preocc. Cramer, 1777)

= Battus laodamas =

Species of butterfly

Battus laodamas, the green-patch swallowtail or yellow-spotted swallowtail, is a species of butterfly in the family Papilionidae.

== Description ==
Battus laodamas has a wingspan of about 90 millimetres (3.5 in). It is a black or dark brown butterfly with green reflections. The dorsal side of the hindwings shows a broad cream or pale green band and a series of cream or pale green spots. The underside of the wings is lighter brown, with a submarginal line of whitish spots on the forewings and a submarginal line of red markings on the hindwings. The forewings have a rounded apex and the outer edge of the hindwings is scalloped. The host plant of its caterpillars is Aristolochia tentaculata.

== Distribution ==
This species is native to the Neotropical realm. It is present in Mexico, Guatemala, Honduras, Costa Rica, Panama, Colombia and Venezuela.

== Subspecies ==
- Battus laodamas laodamas (C. Felder & R. Felder, 1859) Möhn, 1999, Butterflies of the World 5: 7, plate 10, figures 7-8, plate 19, figures 5-6. Smart, 1976 The Illustrated Encyclopedia of the Butterfly World page 158 fig. 14 . Colombia - S.W. Venezuela
- Battus laodamas copanae (Reakirt, 1863) Möhn, 1999, Butterflies of the World 5: 7, plate 10, figures 3-4. S. Mexico, Guatemala, Honduras
- Battus laodamas iopas (Godman & Salvin, 1897) Möhn, 1999, Butterflies of the World 5: 7, plate 10, figures 1-2 N. Mexico
- Battus laodamas rhipidius (Rothschild & Jordan, 1906) Möhn, 1999, Butterflies of the World 5: 7, plate 10, figures 5-6. Costa Rica, Panama

== Gallery ==
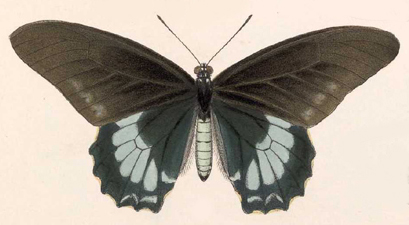
Illustration of B. l. iopas from Biologia Centrali-Americana-Insecta, Vol III Plate 65. Publ. in 1881

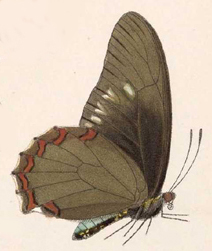
Underside of B. l. iopas
