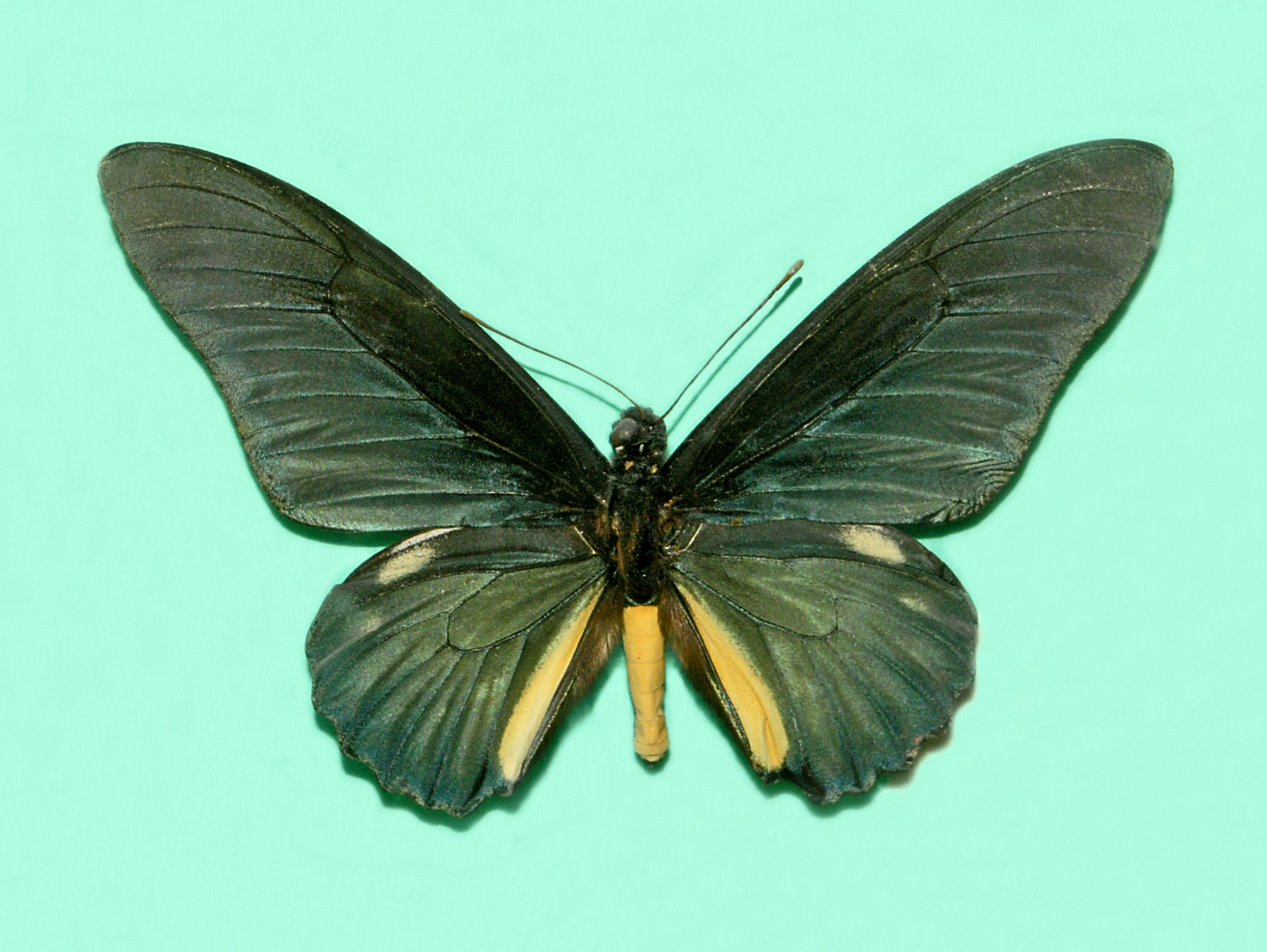
- Museum specimen of Battus lycidas, male
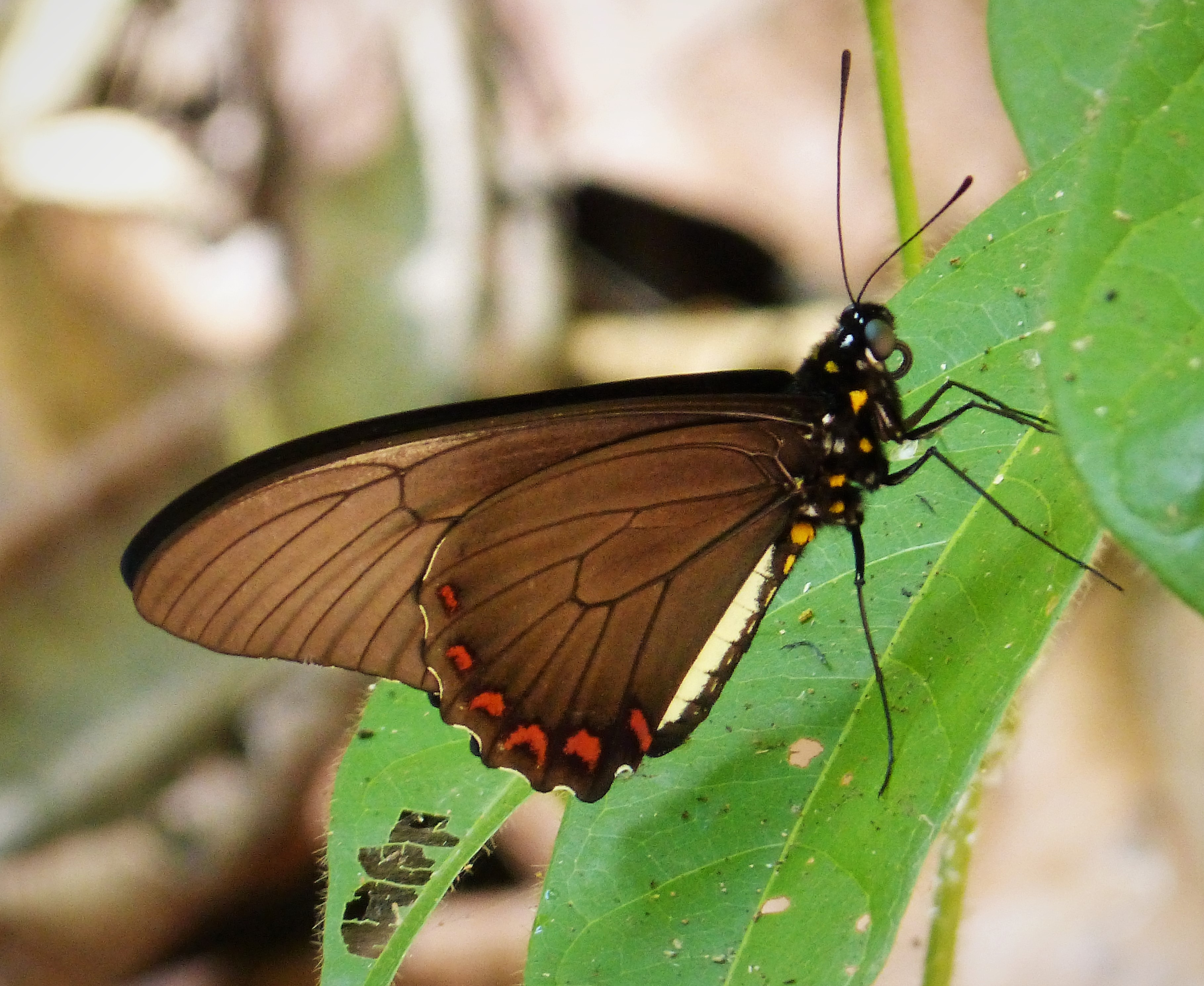

Scientific classification
- Kingdom: Animalia
- Phylum: Arthropoda
- Clade: Pancrustacea
- Class: Insecta
- Order: Lepidoptera
- Family: Papilionidae
- Genus: Battus
- Species: B. lycidas

Binomial name
- Battus lycidas (Cramer, [1777])

Synonyms
- Papilio lycidas Cramer, [1777]; Papilio erymanthus Cramer, [1777]

= Battus lycidas =

Cramer's swallowtail

Species of butterfly

Battus lycidas is a species of butterfly in the family Papilionidae native to the Neotropical realm. It is commonly known as Cramer's swallowtail, the Lycidas swallowtail, and the yellow-trailed swallowtail.

== Description ==
The wingspan of Battus lycidas can reach 10–11 millimetres (0.39–0.43 in). Wings are basically black, with yellow markings and a greenish structure-colour. The hind wings are tailless. This species shows a sexual dimorphism, as in males hind wings have anal androconial creamy yellow patches and the abdomen is yellow cream, while in the females hind wings have faint pale yellow spots forming a discontinuous strip in the middle area. Little is known about this species, but it is not considered threatened. Adults fly in May and June visiting flowers of Warscewiczia coccinea (Rubiaceae) and blooms of Vochysia guatemalensis (Vochysiaceae). The larvae of Battus lycidas feed on Aristolochia huberiana. and on Aristolochia constricta.

== Distribution ==
This species can be found from Mexico to northern Bolivia and southern Pará, Brazil. It is rare in Costa Rica.

== Habitat ==
These butterflies prefer the canopy, the margins of streams and clearings, at an elevation of 0–800 metres (0–2,625 ft) above sea level.
