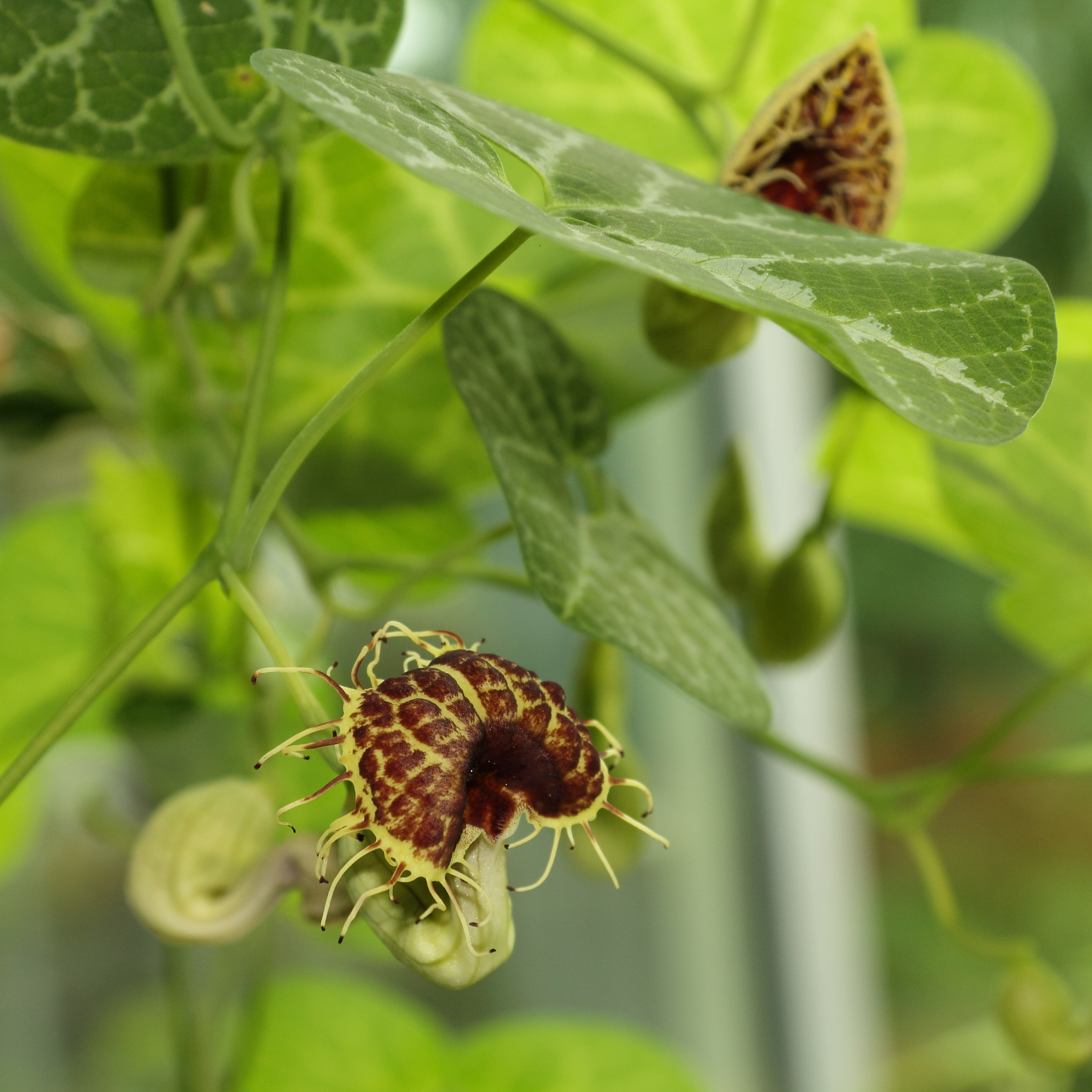

Scientific classification
- Kingdom: Plantae
- Clade: Tracheophytes
- Clade: Angiosperms
- Clade: Magnoliids
- Order: Piperales
- Family: Aristolochiaceae
- Genus: Aristolochia
- Species: A. fimbriata

Binomial name
- Aristolochia fimbriata Cham. & Schltdl 1832

= Aristolochia fimbriata =

Species of vine

Aristolochia fimbriata is a species of perennial plant in the family Aristolochiaceae. It is found in Brazil, Paraguay, Bolivia, Uruguay, and Argentina. The flowering plant attracts butterflies and is known for its traditional medicinal properties.
