= Georges Rousseau-Decelle =

French entomologist

Georges Rousseau-Decelle (2 January 1878, in Roche-sur-Yon – 1965) was a French entomologist.

Rousseau-Decelle amassed a large collection of worldwide butterflies containing many rare species, notably in the genera Morpho and Ornithoptera. He was primarily interested in infraspecific variation.

Georges Rousseau-Decelle was a chevalier de la Légion d’Honneur and a member of the Société entomologique de France.

== Works ==
Partial list
Note the extreme "splitting" (dividing a taxon into multiple taxa) on the basis of minute morphological differences)

- (1933) Quelques formes nouvelles et aberrantes des genres Papilio et Charaxes (Lep.) Bulletin de la Société entomologique de France 37(20): 301-307][P. cleotas lemoulti, P. c. l. individual female form horizonicus, P. c. l. individual female form luteovirens, P. oxynius individual female form niveomarginatus]
- (1933) Note sur quelques formes nouvelles des genres Papilio et Charaxes (Lep.) Bulletin de la Société entomologique de France 38(17):269-273[P. oxynius female form ochracea, P.pausanias pausanias individual male forme burneomaculatus]
- (1935) Note sur quelques formes nouvelles de Morpho (Lep. Morphidae) Bulletin de la Société entomologique de France 40(15):219-226 [M. hercules male individual form violina, M. perseus caius, M.caius form tiberius, M. hecuba obidonus male individual form minima, M. peleides faustina, M. portis thamyris male individual form aegoides, M. p. t. male individual form claro, M. p. t. male individual form argentatus, M. eugenia male individual form parthenopa, M. e. male individual form rosea, M. aega female individual form saphiralineata, M. cypris male individual form cellamaculosa, M. menalaus male individual form purpureotinctus, M. menelaus male individual form chlorophorus, M. godarti male individual form lactescens, M. didius male individual form bipunctata, M. d. male individual form subrufa]
- (1936) Des variations parallèles chez les Morphos des espèces hecuba et perseus (Lepidopt. Morphidae), pp. 293–296, pl. 13. In: Livre Jubilaire de M. Eugène-LouisBouvier. Paris, Fermin-Didot et Cie.
- (1943) Notes sur quelques formes nouvelles de Papilio américains (Lep. Papilionidae) Bulletin de la Société entomologique de France 48(8) :109-113, pl. 1[P. gundlachianus male individual form unipunctus, P. g. male individual form pauperimus, P. vertumnus diceros female individual form regularis, P. drucei male individual form nucalensis, P. iphidamas female individual form poverella, P. lysander isanae, P.l. male individual form extensa, P. l. male individual form reducta, P. neophilus olivencius female individual form rosissima, P. lycophron lycophron male individual form thersitoides, P. l. pirithous female individual form suffusa, P. hyppason male individual form unimacula, P. garleppi interruptus female form xanthica, P.torquatus polybius female form albosignata, P.scamander grayi female individual form leucomelas, P.s.g. male individual form laticlavius, P. s. eurymander female individual form arlequina, P. lysithous form lucius]
- 1960. Note sur une forme nouvelle de Papilio anchises Linn. Papilio anchises orinocensis, subsp. nov. Novedades científicas. Contribuciones ocasionales del Museo de Historia natural La Salle (Caracas) 26: 1-7, 3 figs. [new forms: P. a. o. male form smaragdalis, P. a. o. female form meania]
