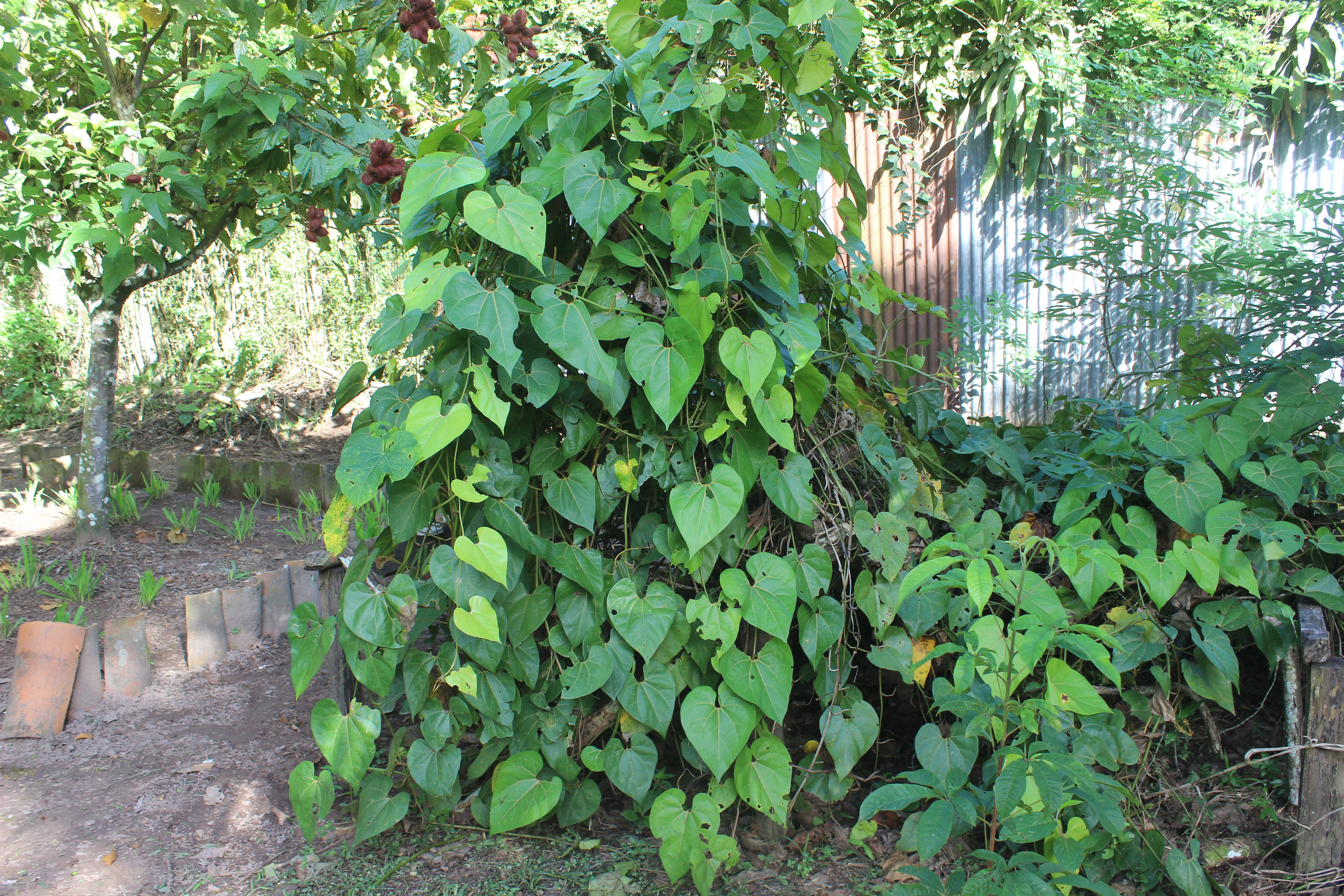

Scientific classification
- Kingdom: Plantae
- Clade: Tracheophytes
- Clade: Angiosperms
- Clade: Magnoliids
- Order: Piperales
- Family: Aristolochiaceae
- Genus: Aristolochia
- Species: A. didyma

Binomial name
- Aristolochia didyma S.Moore

= Aristolochia didyma =

Species of vine

Aristolochia didyma, or yawar panga is a plant found in South America (French Guiana, Brazil, Peru, Panama, Bolivia, Colombia, Ecuador) of the genus Aristolochia. It is a powerful purgative, sometimes used in traditional rites to purify the body a few days before an Ayahuasca session.

Caution is required; injuries are linked to aristolochic acid contained in some species of this family, as in Belgium incorrect identification and misuse of Aristolochia species have resulted in severe consequences. Some cases of kidney failure were related after taking a slimming product in which Guang Fang Ji (Aristolochia) had been used instead of Han Fang Ji (Stephania).
