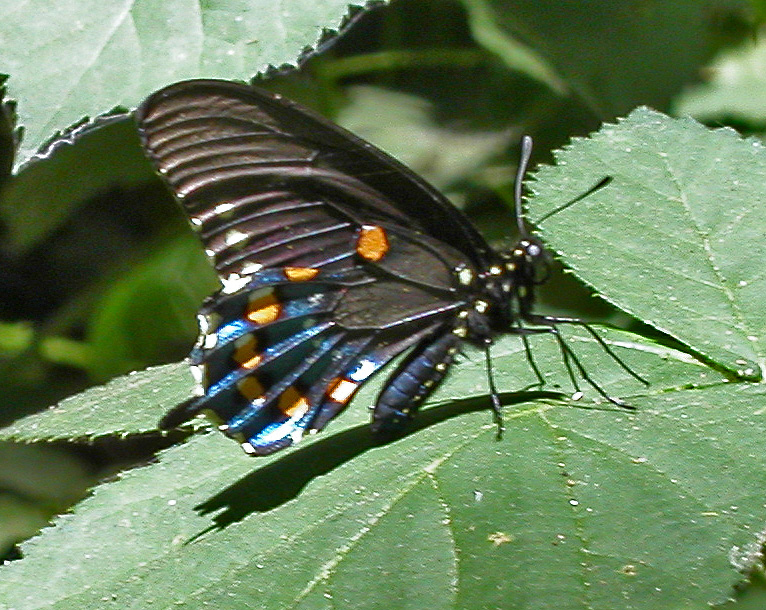
- Pipevine swallowtail (Battus philenor)
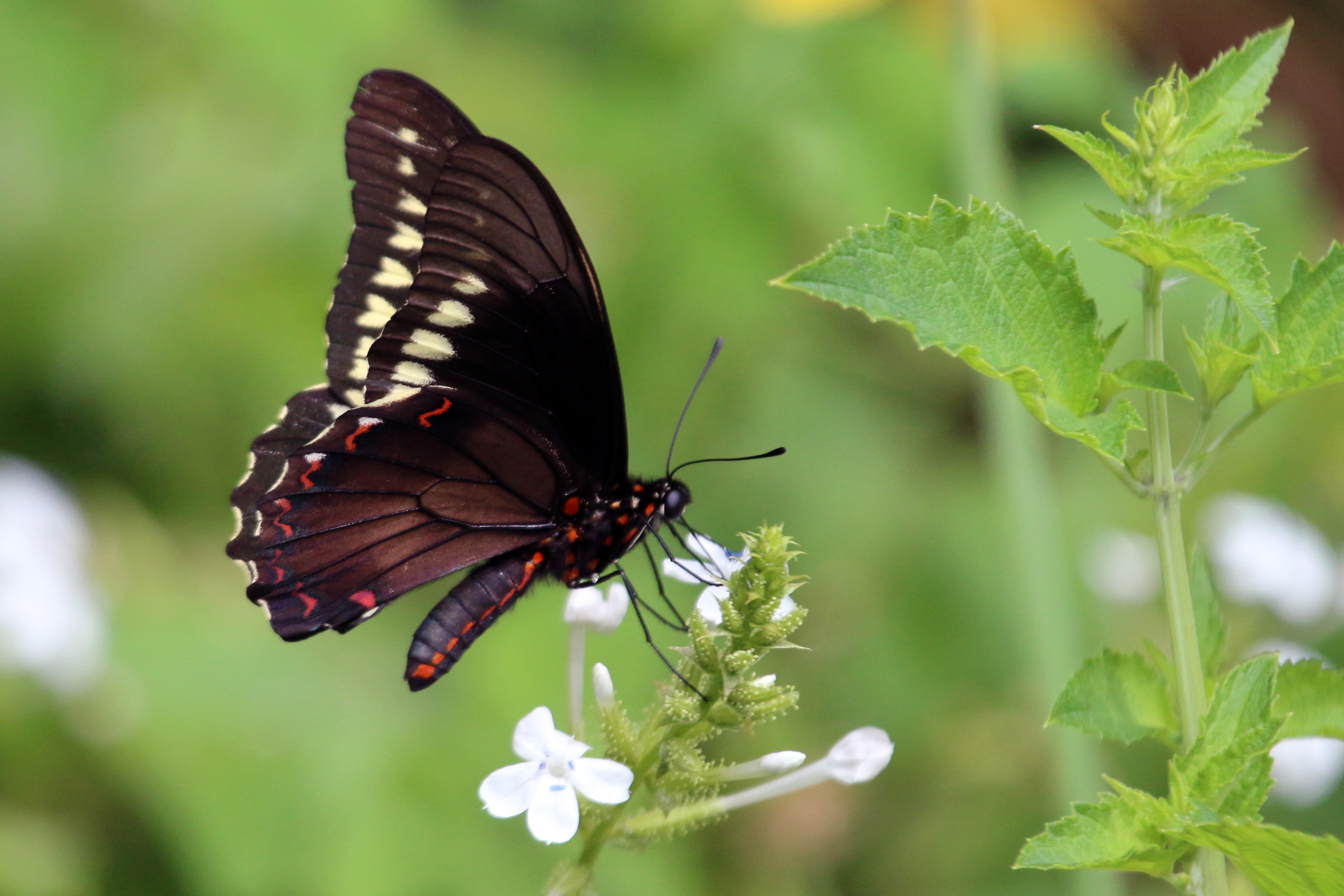
- Polydamas swallowtail (Battus polydamas)

Scientific classification
- Kingdom: Animalia
- Phylum: Arthropoda
- Class: Insecta
- Order: Lepidoptera
- Family: Papilionidae
- Tribe: Troidini
- Genus: Battus; Scopoli, 1777

Type species
- Papilio polydamas Linnaeus, 1758

Species
- See text

= Battus (butterfly) =

Genus of butterflies

Battus is a New World genus of butterflies that are usually found around pipevine (genus Aristolochia) plants. The caterpillars feed off the poisonous pipevines, making the insects poisonous themselves; they taste very bad to ward off predators. Since birds avoid these butterflies, other swallowtail species mimic their coloration. The common North American species are Battus polydamas and Battus philenor.

== Etymology ==
In Greek mythology, Battus is a shepherd who witnessed Hermes stealing Apollo's cattle. Because he broke his promise not to reveal this theft, Hermes turned him to stone.

== Species ==
Listed alphabetically within groups:

subgenus: Battuosa Möhn, 1999

species group: belus Möhn, 1999

- Battus belus (Cramer, 1777) – Belus swallowtail
- Battus crassus (Cramer, 1777) – Crassus swallowtail
- Battus eracon (Godman & Salvin, 1897) – west-Mexican swallowtail, Colima swallowtail
- Battus ingenuus (Dyar, 1907) – Dyar's swallowtail, confused swallowtail
- Battus laodamas (C. & R. Felder, 1859) – green-patch swallowtail, yellow-spotted swallowtail
- Battus lycidas (Cramer, [1777]) – Cramer's swallowtail, yellow-trailed swallowtail
- Battus polystictus (Butler, 1874)

species group: madyes Möhn, 1999

- Battus madyes (Doubleday, 1846) – Madyes swallowtail

subgenus: Battus Möhn, 1999

species group: philenor

- Battus devilliersii (Godart, 1823)
- Battus philenor (Linnaeus, 1771) – pipevine swallowtail
- Battus zetides (Munroe, 1971) – Zetides swallowtail

species group: polydamus Möhn, 1999

- Battus polydamas (Linnaeus, 1758) – Polydamas swallowtail, gold rim swallowtail, or tailless swallowtail

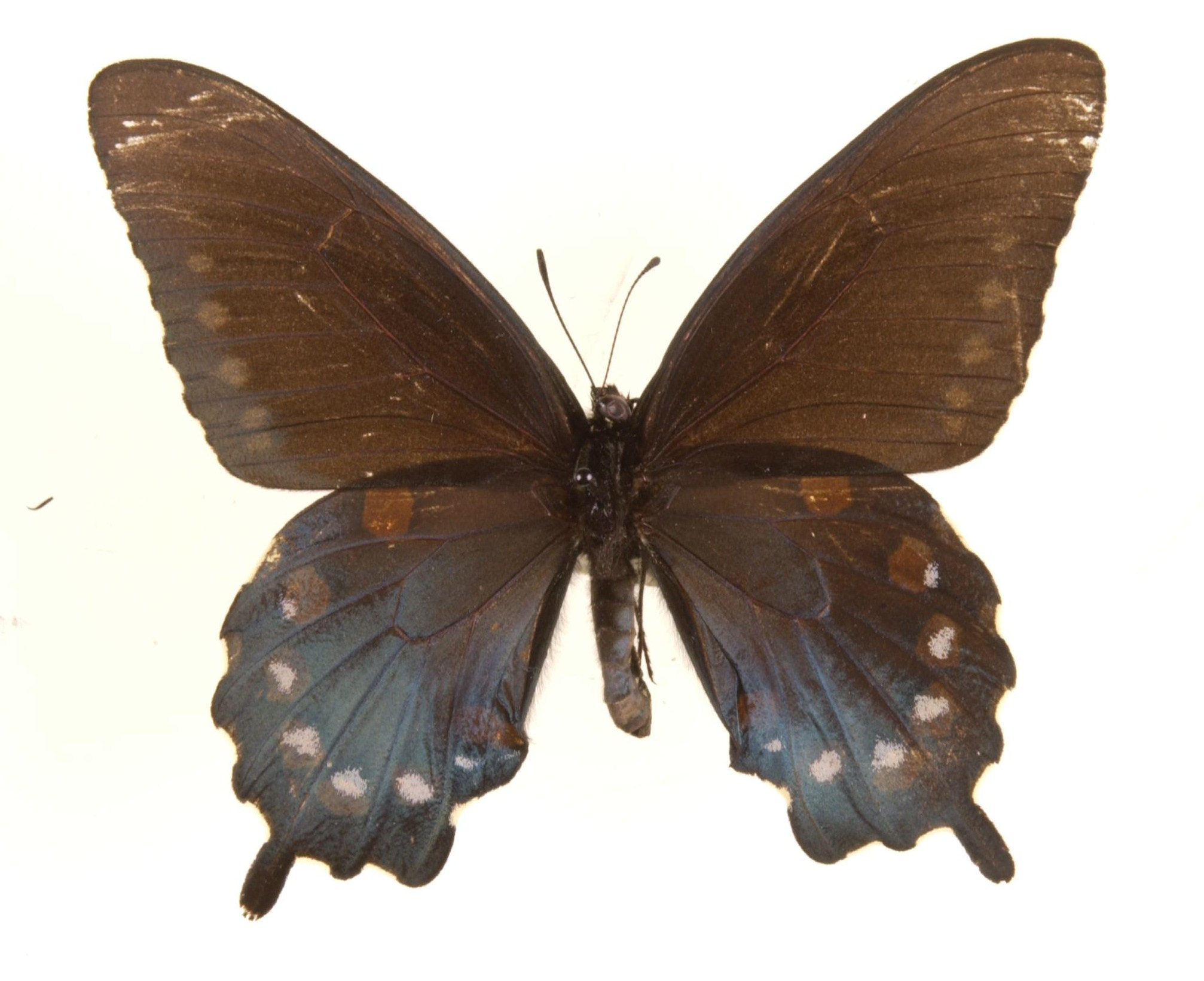
Museum specimen of Battus philenor

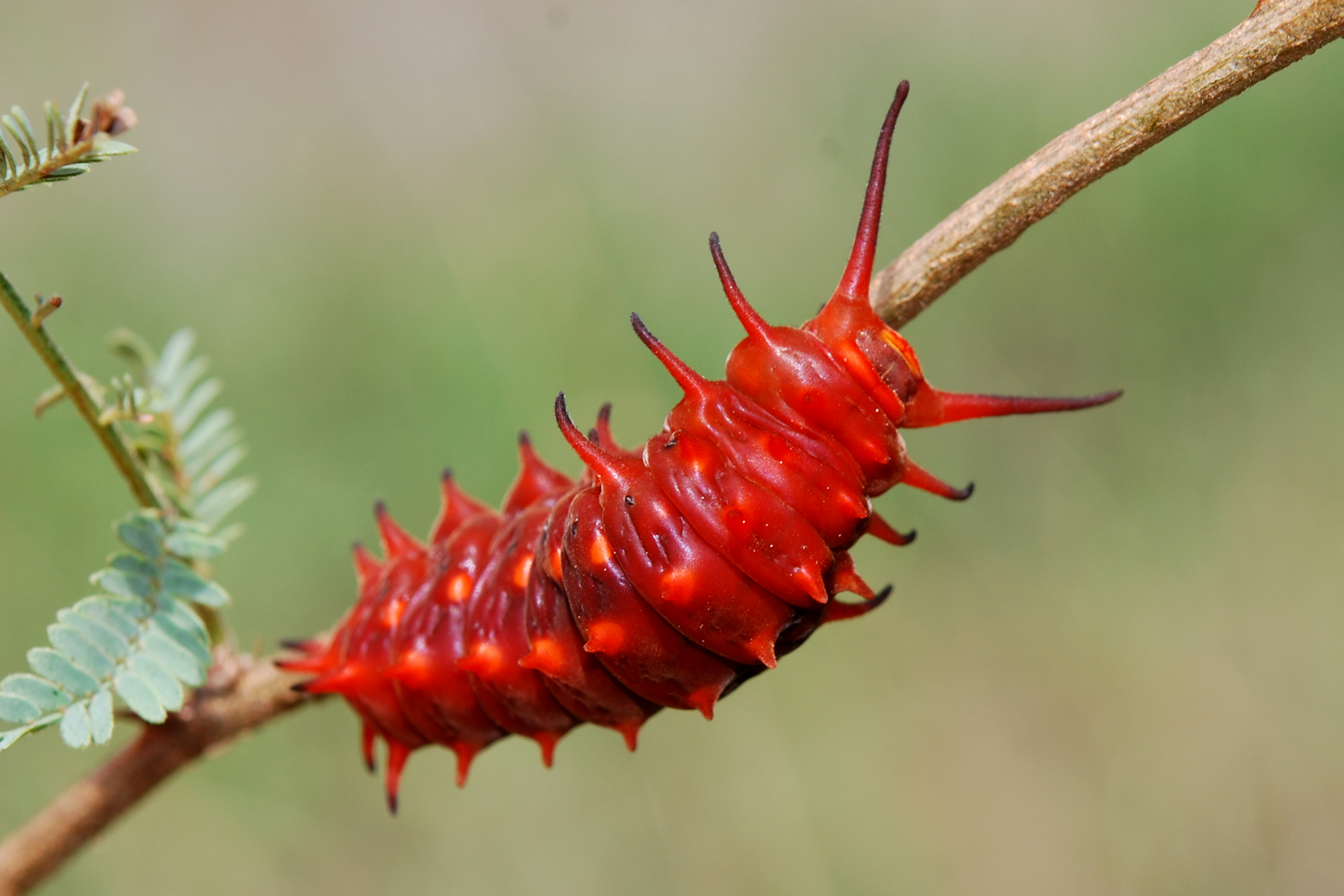
Battus philenor caterpillar, high-temperature red form

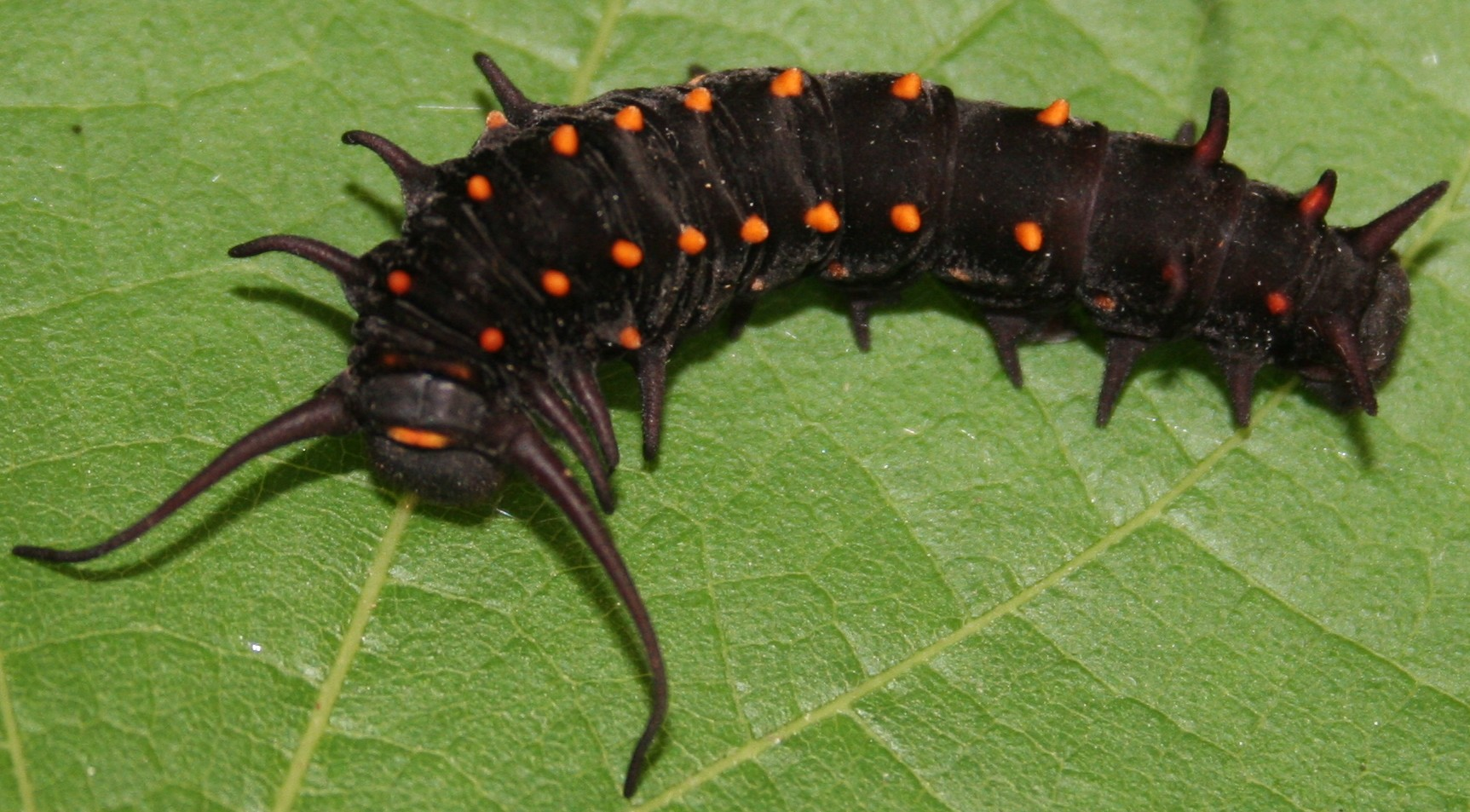
Battus philenor caterpillar, low temperature black form

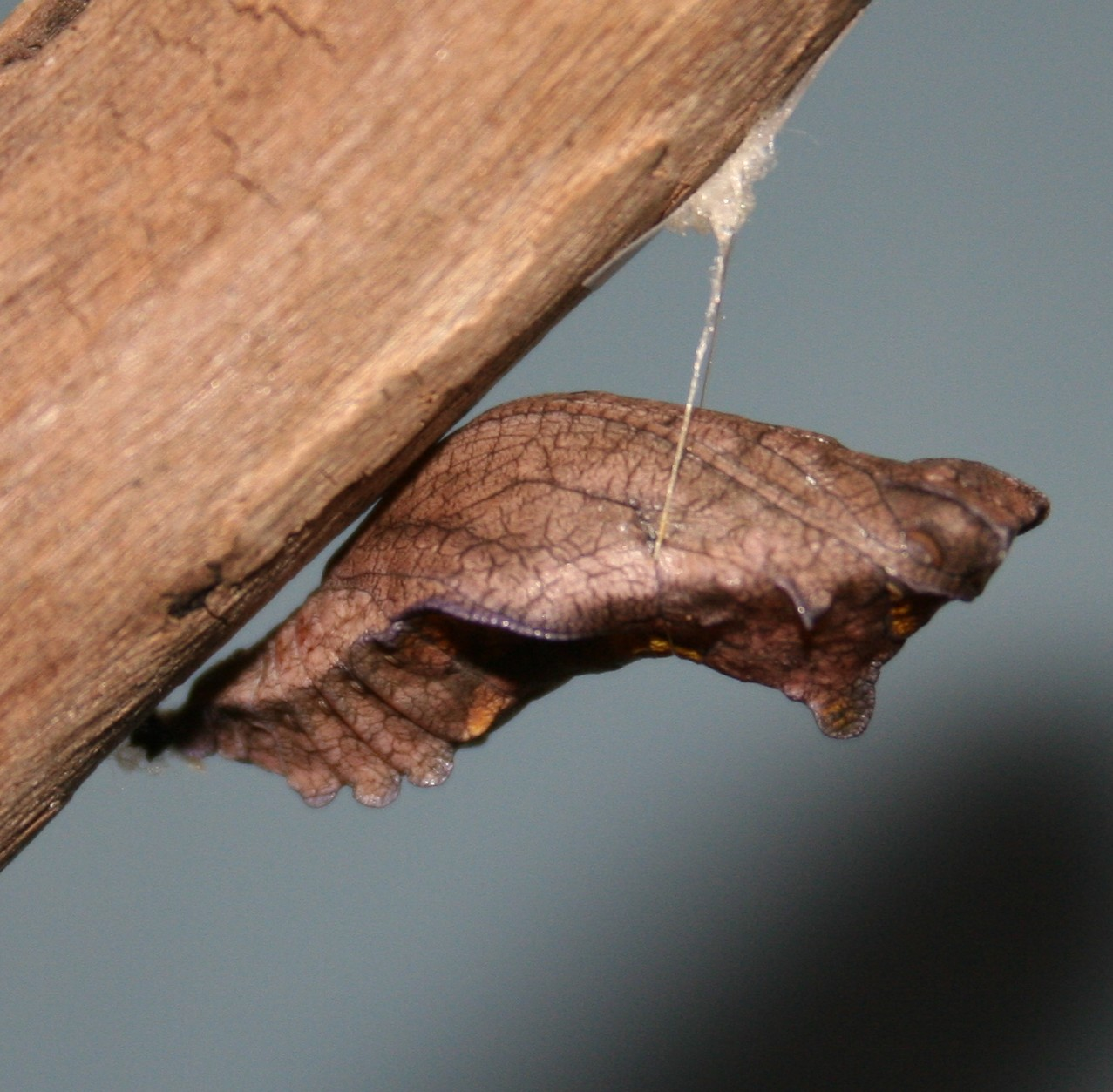
Battus philenor pupa
