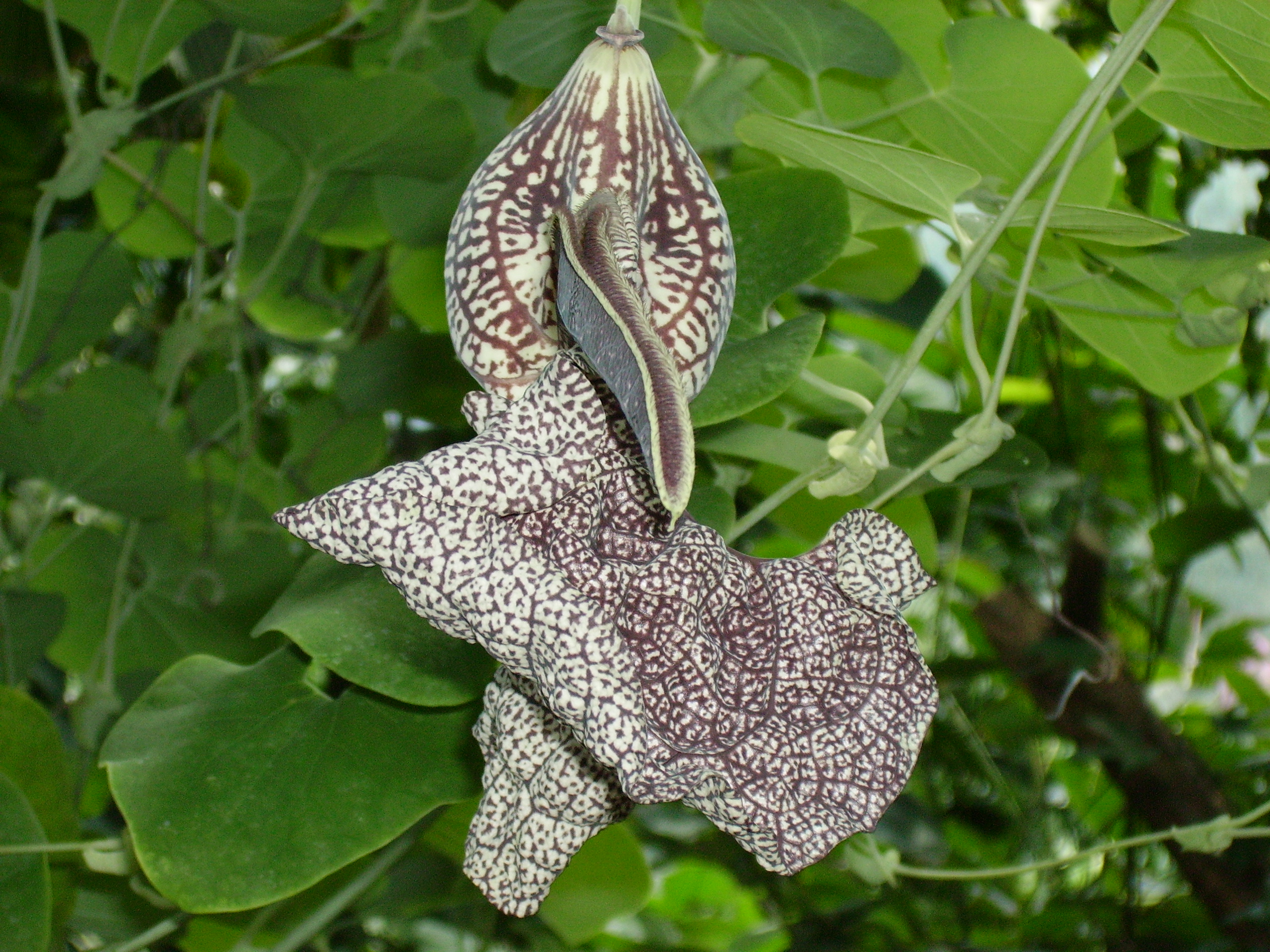

Scientific classification
- Kingdom: Plantae
- Clade: Tracheophytes
- Clade: Angiosperms
- Clade: Magnoliids
- Order: Piperales
- Family: Aristolochiaceae
- Genus: Aristolochia
- Species: A. labiata

Binomial name
- Aristolochia labiata Willd.

Synonyms
- Aristolochia brasiliensis Mart. et Zucc.

= Aristolochia labiata =

Species of vine

Aristolochia labiata, the mottled Dutchman's pipe or rooster flower, is an ornamental plant which is native to Brazil.
