= Skinner (surname) =

Skinner is a surname. It is an occupational surname of English origin, from the Old Norse word 'skinn', denoting someone who stripped the hide from animals, to be used in the production of fur clothing or leather.

Notable people with the surname include:

== Politics and law ==
- Ahmad Wally Skinner (1924–2014), Bruneian nobleman and politician
- Alanson Skinner (1794–1876), New York politician
- Alonzo A. Skinner (1814–1877), United States judge
- Avery Skinner (1796–1876), New York politician
- Avery Skinner (volleyball) (born 1999), American volleyball player
- Carlton Skinner (1913–2004), Governor of Guam
- Cortlandt Skinner (1727–1799), Loyalist officer during the American Revolutionary War
- Dennis Skinner (born 1932), British MP for Bolsover
- Ed Skinner (1936–2015), American politician
- Harry Skinner (politician) (1855–1929), US Representative from North Carolina
- Henry Skinner (1926–1986), British judge
- James John Skinner (1923–2008), Irish-born Zambian politician and jurist
- Jerry Skinner (1900–1962), New Zealand MP
- Jillian Skinner (born 1944), Australian politician
- Leo Skinner (1901–1970), Irish Fianna Fáil politician
- Mark Skinner (1813–1887), US Attorney for Illinois
- Nancy Skinner (California politician) (born 1954), Democratic member of the California State Senate
- Nancy Skinner (commentator), radio and television commentator based in Michigan
- Onias C. Skinner (1817–1878), Illinois jurist and lawyer
- Peter Skinner (born 1959), British Labour politician, MEP for South East England
- Richard Skinner (American politician) (1778–1833), American politician, attorney, and jurist from Vermont
- Roger Skinner (1773–1825), New York judge
- Samuel K. Skinner (born 1938), White House Chief of Staff during the presidency of George H. W. Bush
- Sandy Skinner (born 1988/1989), Saint-Pierrais politician
- Thomas Gregory Skinner (1842–1907), US Representative from North Carolina
- Thomson J. Skinner (1752–1809), US Representative from Massachusetts
- Tom Skinner (1909–1991), New Zealand trade unionist
- William I. Skinner (1812–1891), New York politician

== Writers ==
- Charles Montgomery Skinner (1852–1907), American writer
- Constance Lindsay Skinner (1877–1939), Canadian writer, historian
- Harriet Hayes Skinner (1817–1893), American writer and editor
- Mollie Skinner (1876–1955), Australian writer
- Quentin Skinner (born 1940), Regius Professor of Modern History at Cambridge University and author

== Media and arts ==
- Claire Skinner (born 1964), English actress
- Cornelia Otis Skinner (1899–1979), American author and actress
- Emily Skinner (born 1970), American stage actress
- Emily Skinner (born 2002), American actress
- Fannie Lovering Skinner (1856–1938), American composer
- Frank Skinner (born 1957), English comedian
- Frank Skinner (1897–1968), American composer
- Grahame Skinner, Scottish singer
- James Scott Skinner (1843–1927), Scottish fiddler
- Jane Skinner (born 1967), American news anchor
- Janet Lynn Skinner (born 1955), American gospel musician
- John Skinner (1721–1807), Scottish historian and songwriter
- Katch Skinner, British ceramicist
- Leonard Skinner (1933–2010), American schoolteacher most famous as the namesake of the band Lynyrd Skynyrd
- Mike Skinner (born 1978), British rapper under the name the Streets
- Penelope Skinner (born 1971), British playwright & screenwriter
- Quest Skinner (born 1978), American mixed media artist
- Richard Skinner (born 1951), British radio broadcaster
- Robin Daniel Skinner (born 1998), English musician under the name Cavetown
- Tom Skinner (born 1980), English drummer
- Zena Skinner (1927–2018), British cookery expert on television and radio

== Sports ==
- Steve Keirn (born 1951), American professional wrestler best known as "Skinner"
- Al Skinner (born 1952), American men's college basketball head coach and a former collegiate and professional basketball player
- Albert Skinner (1868–?), English footballer
- Avery Skinner (born 1999), American professional volleyball player
- Barbara Skinner (1911–1942), British racing driver
- Bernard Skinner (sailor) (1930–2016), Canadian Olympian
- Bob Skinner (born 1931), American professional baseball player
- Brett Skinner (born 1983), Canadian ice hockey player
- Brian Skinner (born 1976), American professional basketball player
- Callum Skinner (born 1992), Scottish track cyclist
- Craig Skinner (born 1969), American volleyball coach
- Deontae Skinner (born 1990), American football player
- Edward Arthur Skinner, (1847–1919) English cricketer
- Jeff Skinner (born 1992), Canadian ice hockey player
- Jimmy Skinner (1917–2007), former head coach of the NHL's Detroit Red Wings
- JL Skinner (born 2001), American football player
- Joel Skinner (born 1961), baseball player
- Jonty Skinner, South African Olympian and American swimming coach
- Mike Skinner (NASCAR) (born 1957), NASCAR driver
- Mykayla Skinner (born 1996), American artistic gymnast
- Quentin Skinner (American football) (born 2001), American football player
- Roy Skinner (1930–2010), American basketball coach who helped integrate the NCAA's Southeastern Conference
- Sam Skinner (footballer) (born 1997), Australian rules footballer
- Sonny Skinner (born 1960), American professional golfer
- Stuart Skinner (born 1998), Canadian ice hockey goaltender
- Talvin Skinner (born 1952), American professional basketball player
- Todd Skinner (1958–2006), American rock climber
- Wilfred Skinner (1934–2003), Singaporean international player in association football and field hockey
- Zephaniah Skinner (born 1989), Australian rules footballer

== Others ==
- Bernard Skinner (died 2017), English lepidopterist
- B. F. Skinner (1904–1990), American behaviorist, psychologist and author
- Clarence Skinner (1881–1949), Universalist minister
- Edith Skinner (1902–1981), Canadian vocal coach working in the United States
- Edward Skinner (1869–1910), British architect
- Ernest M. Skinner (1866–1960), American pipe organ craftsman
- Eugene Skinner (1809–1864), founder of the town of Eugene, Oregon
- Francis Skinner (1912–1941), friend of Ludwig Wittgenstein
- George Herbert Skinner (1872–1931), British carburetter manufacturer
- H. Catherine W. Skinner (1931-2025), American geologist
- Harrie Skinner (1854–1936), founder of the Royal Automobile Club of Australia
- Henry Skinner (1861–1926), American lepidopterist
- Herbert Wakefield Banks Skinner (1900–1960), British physicist
- John Kendrick Skinner (1883–1918), Scottish recipient of the Victoria Cross
- John O. Skinner (1845–1932), American physician, recipient of the Medal of Honor
- Leslie Skinner (1900–1978), American scientist and military officer
- Michael Skinner, American epigeneticist
- Wickham Skinner, American educator

== Disambiguation pages ==
- Charles Skinner (disambiguation)
- Clarence Skinner (disambiguation)
- Craig Skinner (disambiguation)
- David Skinner (disambiguation)
- Edward Skinner (disambiguation)
- Frank Skinner (disambiguation)
- Harry Skinner (disambiguation)
- Henry Skinner (disambiguation)
- James Skinner (disambiguation)
- Michael Skinner (disambiguation)
- Stephen Skinner (disambiguation)
- Thomas Skinner (disambiguation)
- Will Skinner (disambiguation)

== Fictional characters ==
- Agnes Skinner, mother of Seymour Skinner in The Simpsons
- Rodney Skinner, the Invisible Man in the film The League of Extraordinary Gentlemen
- Seymour Skinner (Principal Skinner), Springfield elementary school principal in The Simpsons
- Walter Skinner, from The X-Files
- Chef Skinner, the main villain of the 2007 film Ratatouille
- Skinner (comics), a Marvel Comics demon
- Skinner (Neighbours), on the Australian soap opera Neighbours from 1988 to 1989
- Mr Skinner, henchmen from 101 Dalmatians (1996 film)
- Simon Skinner, Manager of Sandford's supermarket in Hot Fuzz (2007 film)
