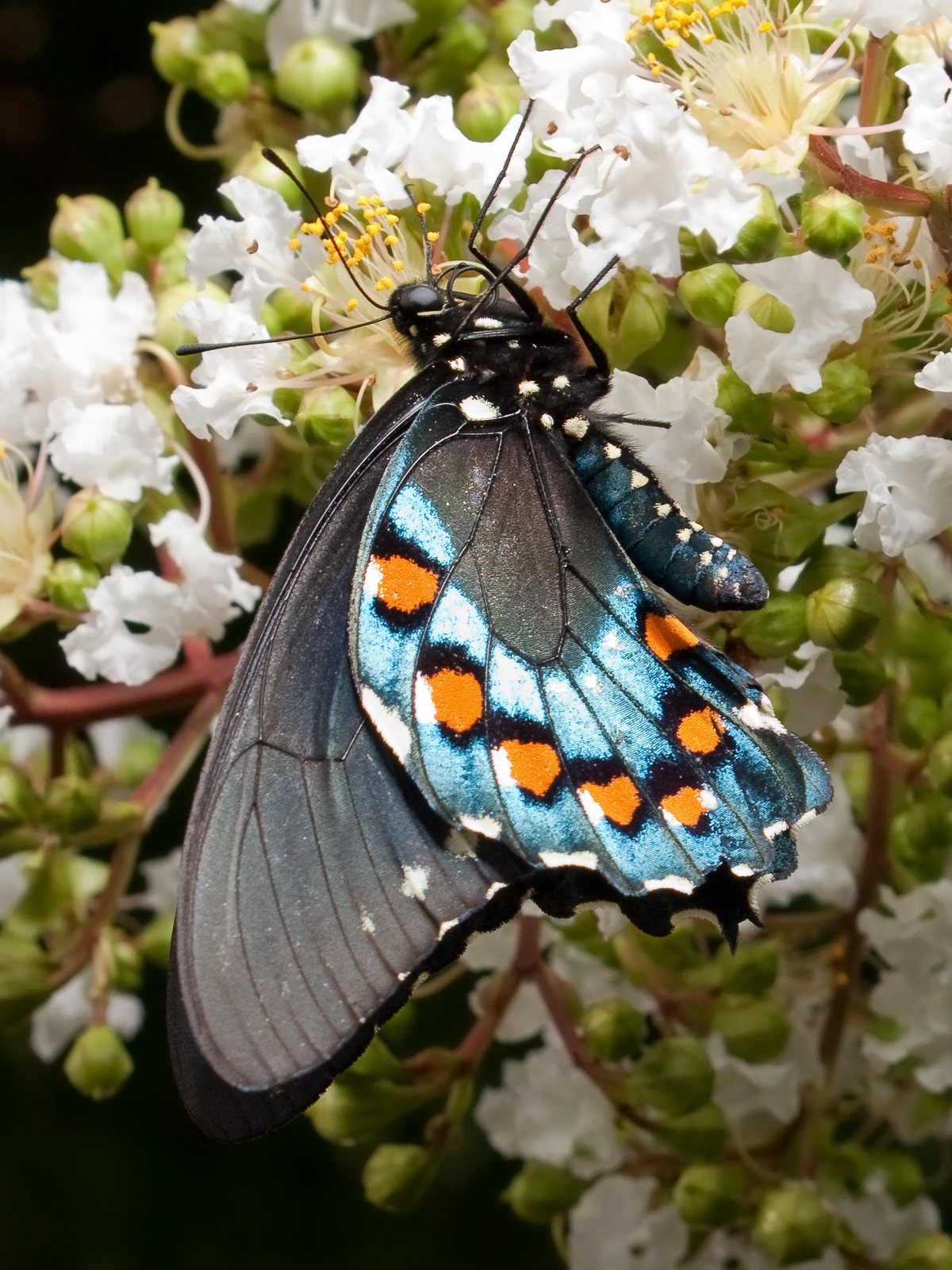
- Ventral view
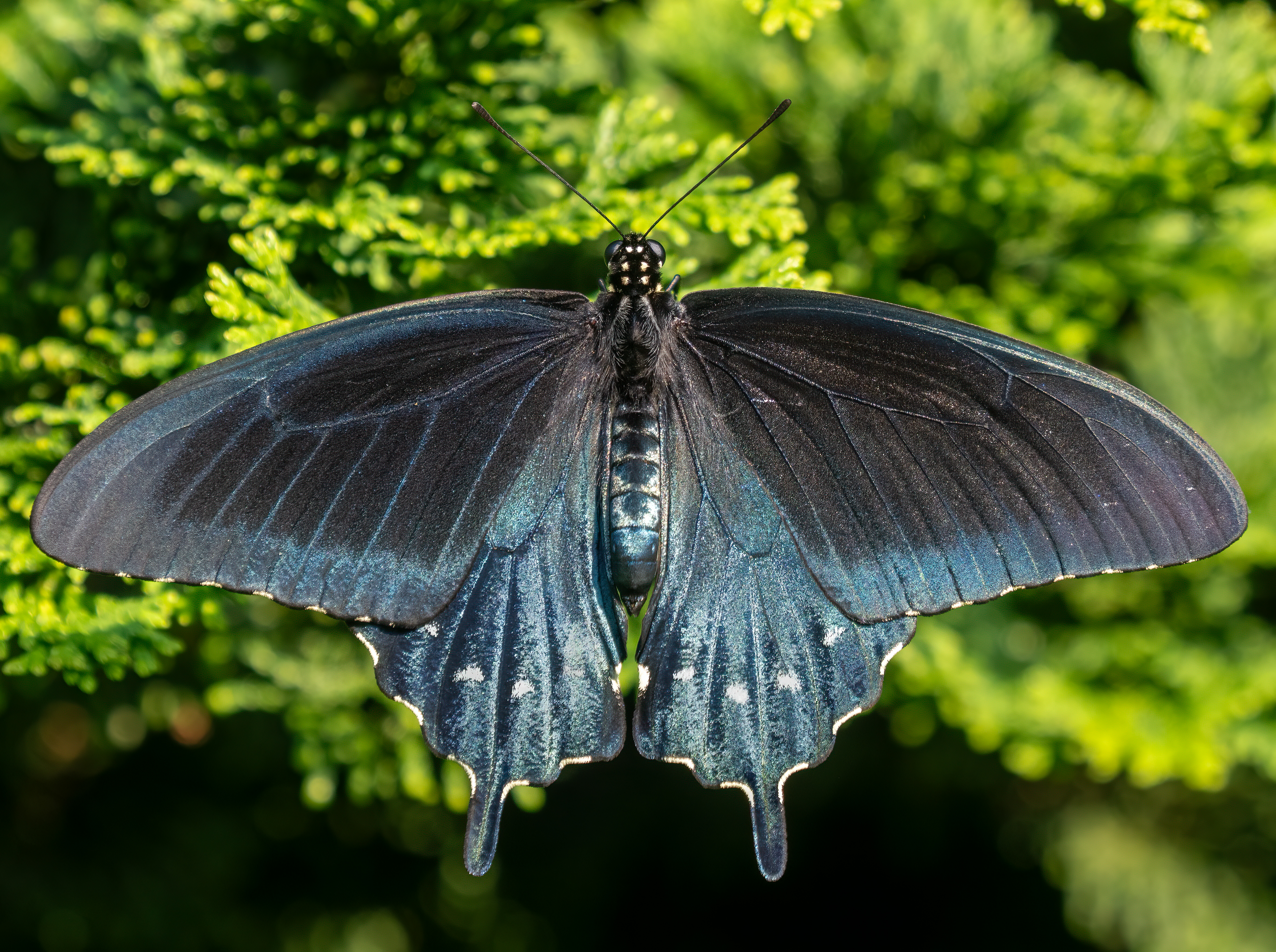
- Dorsal view

Conservation status
- Least Concern (IUCN 3.1)

- Secure (NatureServe)

Scientific classification
- Kingdom: Animalia
- Phylum: Arthropoda
- Clade: Pancrustacea
- Class: Insecta
- Order: Lepidoptera
- Family: Papilionidae
- Genus: Battus
- Species: B. philenor

Binomial name
- Battus philenor (Linnaeus, 1771)

Subspecies
- See text

= Battus philenor =

Pipevine swallowtail

Species of butterfly

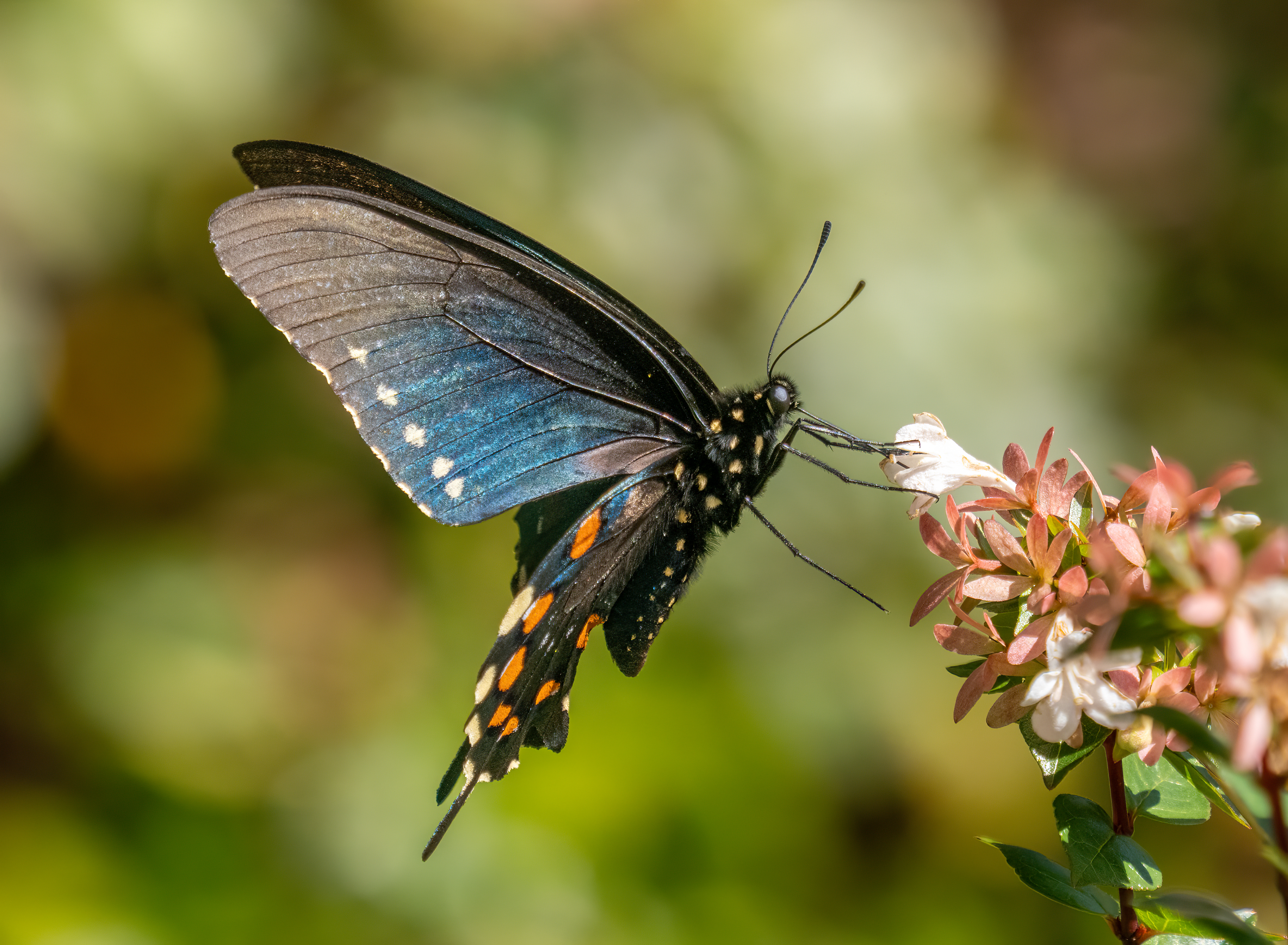
Female B. philenor fluttering at a flower in Tennessee

Battus philenor, the pipevine swallowtail or blue swallowtail, is a swallowtail butterfly found in North America and Central America. This butterfly is black with iridescent-blue hindwings. They are found in many different habitats, but are most commonly found in forests. Based on environmental temperatures, Caterpillars are often black or red. They feed on compatible plants of the genus Aristolochia. They are known for sequestering acids from the plants they feed on in order to defend themselves from predators by being poisonous when consumed. The adults feed on the nectar of a variety of flowers. Some species of Aristolochia are toxic to the larvae, typically tropical varieties. While enthusiasts have led citizen efforts to conserve pipevine swallowtails in their neighborhoods on the West coast, the butterfly has not been the subject of a formal program in conservation or protected in legislation. The butterfly is however of "Special Concern" in Michigan, which is on the Northern limit of its range.

== Nomenclature ==
The pipevine swallowtail was first identified in 1771 by Linnaeus and originally was placed in the genus Papilo, as was typical for butterflies. In 1777, it was moved to the genus Battus by Scopoli. The name Battus comes from the founder of the Greek colony of Cyrenaica, Battus I, and the species name philenor comes from the Greek word meaning 'fond of husband'. The pipevine swallowtail also belongs to the tribe Troidini, a group of butterflies whose larvae all feed on plants of the genus Aristolochia. They are referred to as the Aristolochia butterflies.

== Distribution and habitat ==
The pipevine swallowtail has a wide distribution across the Northern Americas. In the United States, the butterfly is found in New England down to Florida west to Nebraska, Texas, New Mexico, Arizona, California, and Oregon. There is also an isolated population which is geographically disjunct in central California. Researchers presume that this population may have arisen through recent colonization, based on this pipevine swallowtail's distinct egg-clutch size and lack of mimetic relationships with other Battus philenor populations. They have been observed as far south as Mexico and as far north as Ontario, although these sightings are inconsistent.

The butterfly frequents warmer, more temperate environments, and can be found mostly in open grasslands, woodlands, meadows, and backyard gardens. They favor anywhere pipevine (Aristolochia) can grow in abundance.

== Host plants and food resources ==
=== Larvae ===
Pipevine swallowtail larvae feed on plants within the genus Aristolochia. These are commonly known as pipevine plants, which is where the butterfly gets its common name. This plant genus is known to have active aristolochic acids, which pipevine swallowtail larvae sequester and use for defensive properties.

A common host plant is the Virginia snakeroot, (Aristolochia serpentaria), which can be found in the Eastern United States and in Florida. It has broad-leaved and narrow-leaved forms, and both act as hosts for swallowtail larvae. Other host plants include Pipevine (Aristolochia macrophylla), Woolly Dutchman's pipe (Aristolochia tomentosa), Texas Dutchman's pipe (Aristolochia reticulate), Watson's Dutchman's pipe (Aristolochia watsonii), and California Dutchman's pipe (Aristolochia californica). Some Aristolochia species are actually toxic or extremely distasteful to larvae and thus may act as death traps for the butterflies. This is especially true of exotic variants.

=== Adults ===
Pipevine swallowtail adults use nectar-producing plants as hosts; there are many plants that fit this criterion. These butterflies frequent thistle (Cirsium) flowers, the pink and purple flowers of the Phlox species, and ironweed of Vernonia species.

== Life cycle ==
=== Eggs ===
The eggs of the pipevine swallowtail vary in color from red to orange. They are small and are laid on host plant stems. A distinctive feature of these eggs which is shared by all Aristolochia butterflies is that the outer layer of the egg is covered by a firm and nourishing excretion laid in vertical stripes along the outside. The egg appears bumpy due to the excretion forming large beads along the bands. The female pipevine swallowtail deposits this excretion from a gland above the ovipositor during the egg laying process.

These butterflies lay their eggs on the leaves of host plants in clusters with access to sunlight. The larvae hatch after a few days and immediately eat the remnants of the egg from which they emerged.

=== Larvae ===
Pipevine swallowtail larvae are around 5 cm in length and vary in color from dark brown to black. Since the larvaes coloring is temperature-dependent, in areas of higher temperature such as Texas and Arizona, a red coloring dominates, whereas black coloration occurs at cooler temperatures. Larvae have bright orange spots on the ends of tubercles in rows along their body, and at either end of the body the tubercles are elongated into filaments. Full grown larvae have a glossy or velvet appearance due to many fine hairs. Larvae sex determination can be done by looking at pits along the ventral surface at the ends of the abdominal sections.

Larvae spend almost all their time eating the leaves of their host plants. Once they completely remove edible matter from one plant they move to the next one. They eat in groups at first but as food sources deplete they become more solitary as they move on in search of fresh host plants. Larvae filaments help them identify vertical plants, which are then determined to be host or non-host by using their mouthparts. The larvae feed and wander for several weeks before finding an isolated spot to pupate.

=== Pupae ===
The pipevine swallowtail pupae are colored green or brown. They are about 6 to 7 cm in length. These pupae differ from other swallowtail butterfly pupae in that the sides of their pupae bodies widen into a sort of a winged appearance, with distinctive purplish edges along the sides of these extensions.

Pipevine swallowtail pupation takes place many feet off the ground on tree trunks or other suitable spots. Pupation is rare on green surfaces. Pupation begins when the larva releases silk to form a support structure so that the chrysalis can hang safely. In colder climates, it will spend the winter as a pupa, but in warmer climates, pupation only lasts a few weeks. Prior to emerging as an adult, the wing markings of the butterfly can be seen through the chrysalis.

=== Adults ===
Pipevine swallowtail adults have a wingspan from 7 to 13 cm. The dorsal wings of an adult male are black with vibrant blue iridescence on the hind wings. Female iridescence is duller in appearance. Bright orange spots are visible on the back end of the ventral wings. The adults from Californian populations of these butterflies have smaller and hairier bodies and are thought to be a subspecies Battus philenor hirsute.

The adult pipevine swallowtail male spends most of its time feeding and searching for mates. Males have also been observed to take moisture and nutrients from mud, a behavior that is motivated by the presence of other males. Females spend their time feeding, being courted by males, and reproducing. Immediately after emerging from the chrysalis, adult butterflies spend time near the pupa case and dry their wings and remove pupal waste products from their bodies. The butterflies are seen during the spring and summer months.

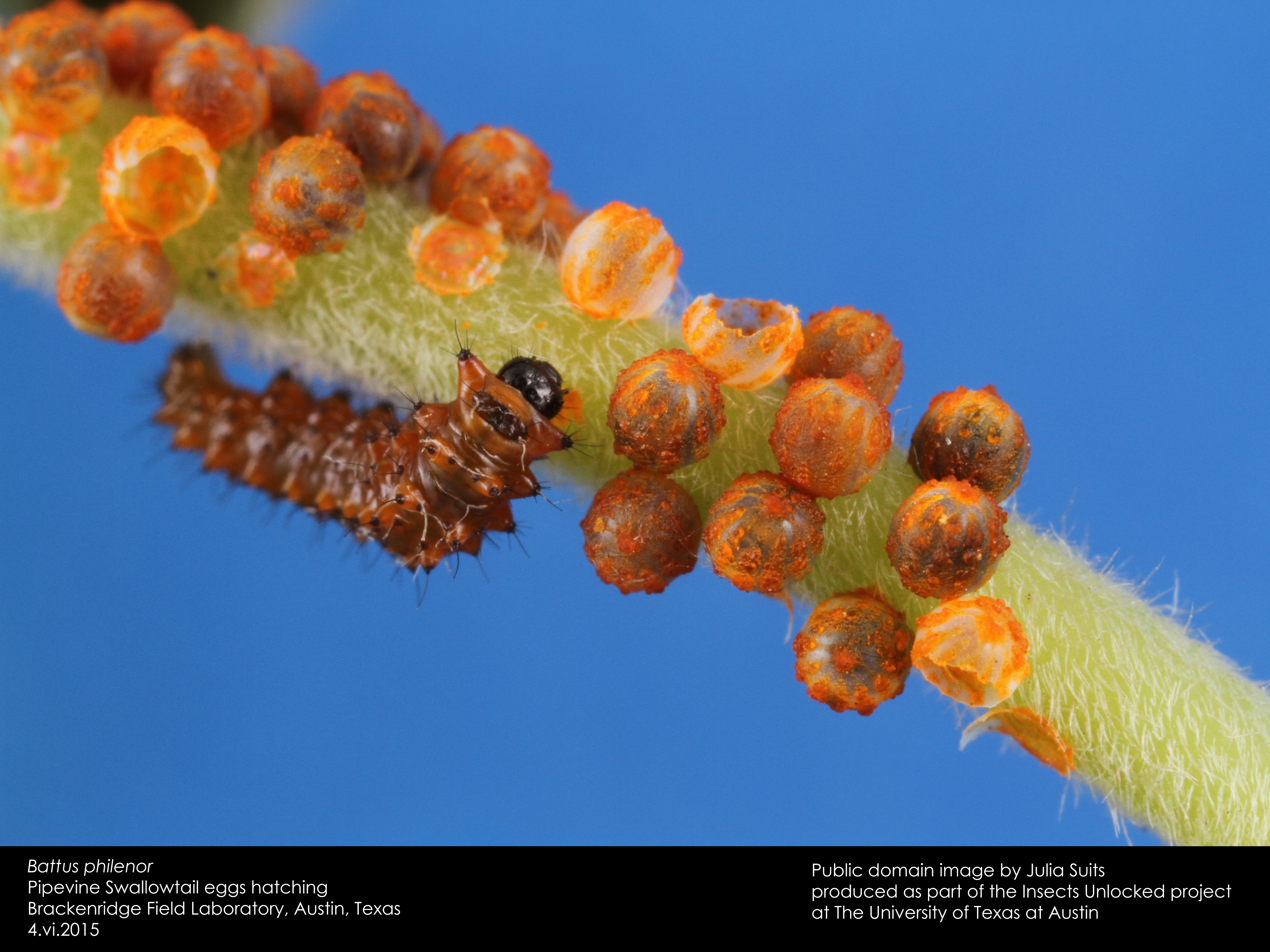
Pipevine swallowtail eggs with vertical stripes

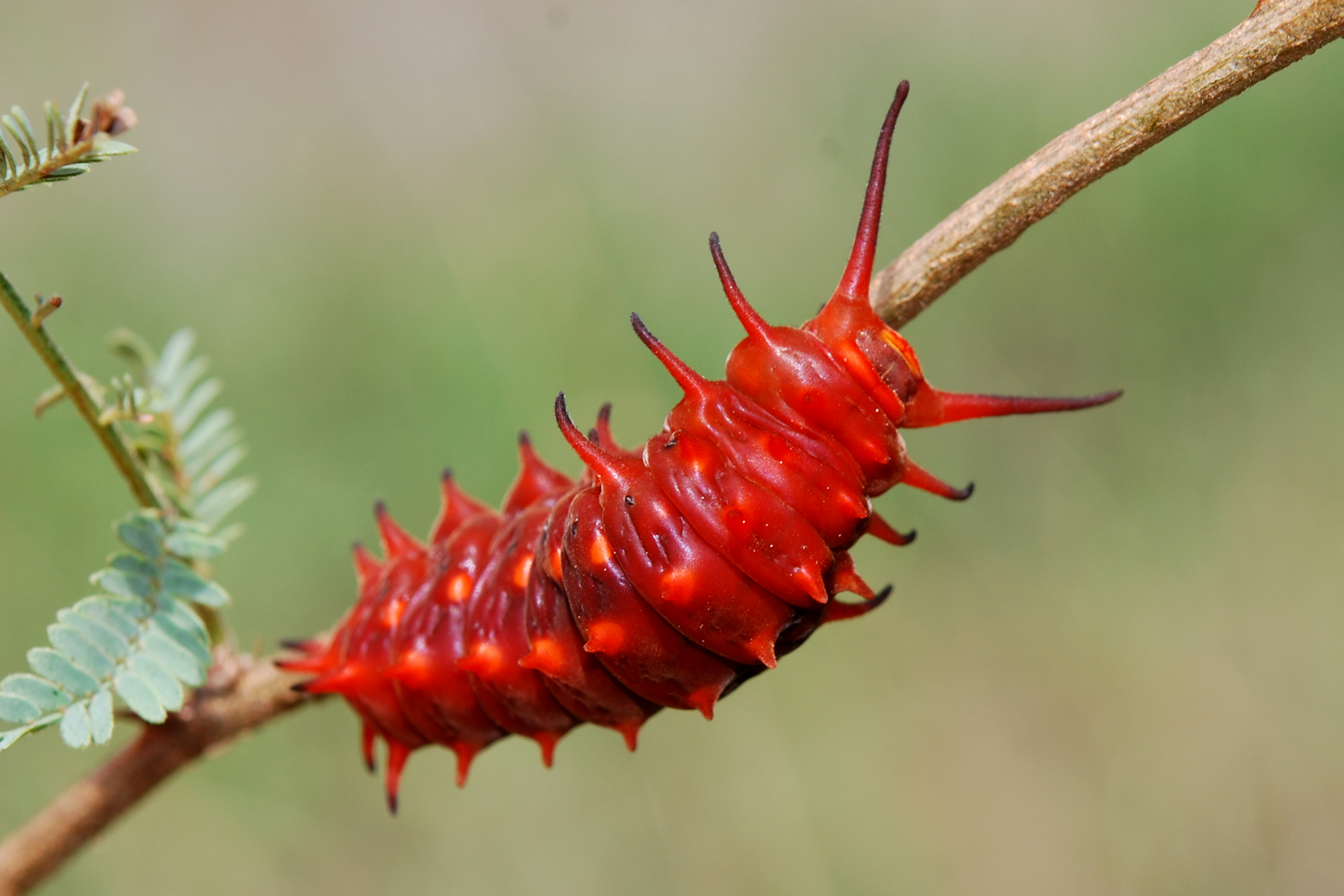
Red pipevine swallowtail larva

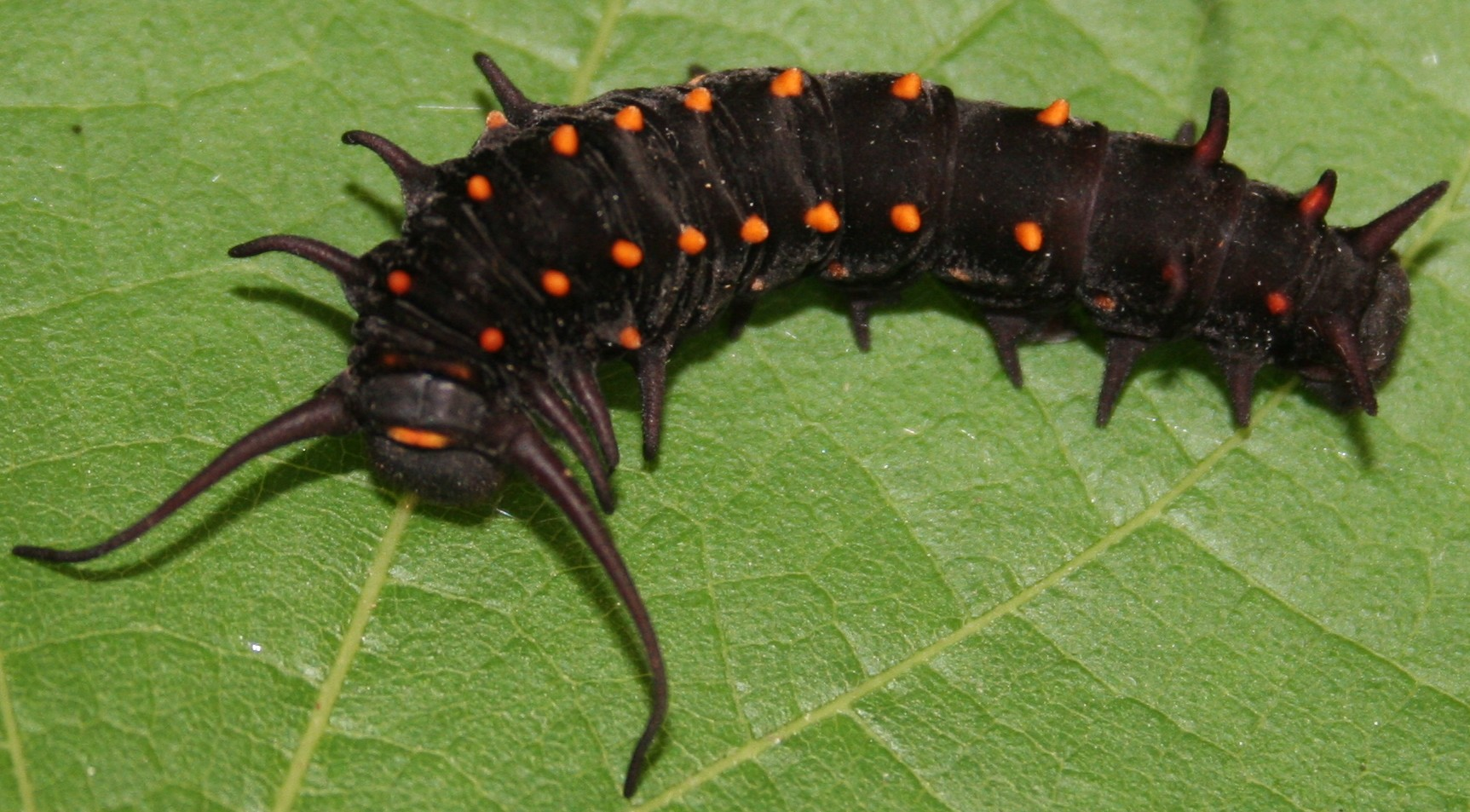
Dark pipevine swallowtail larva

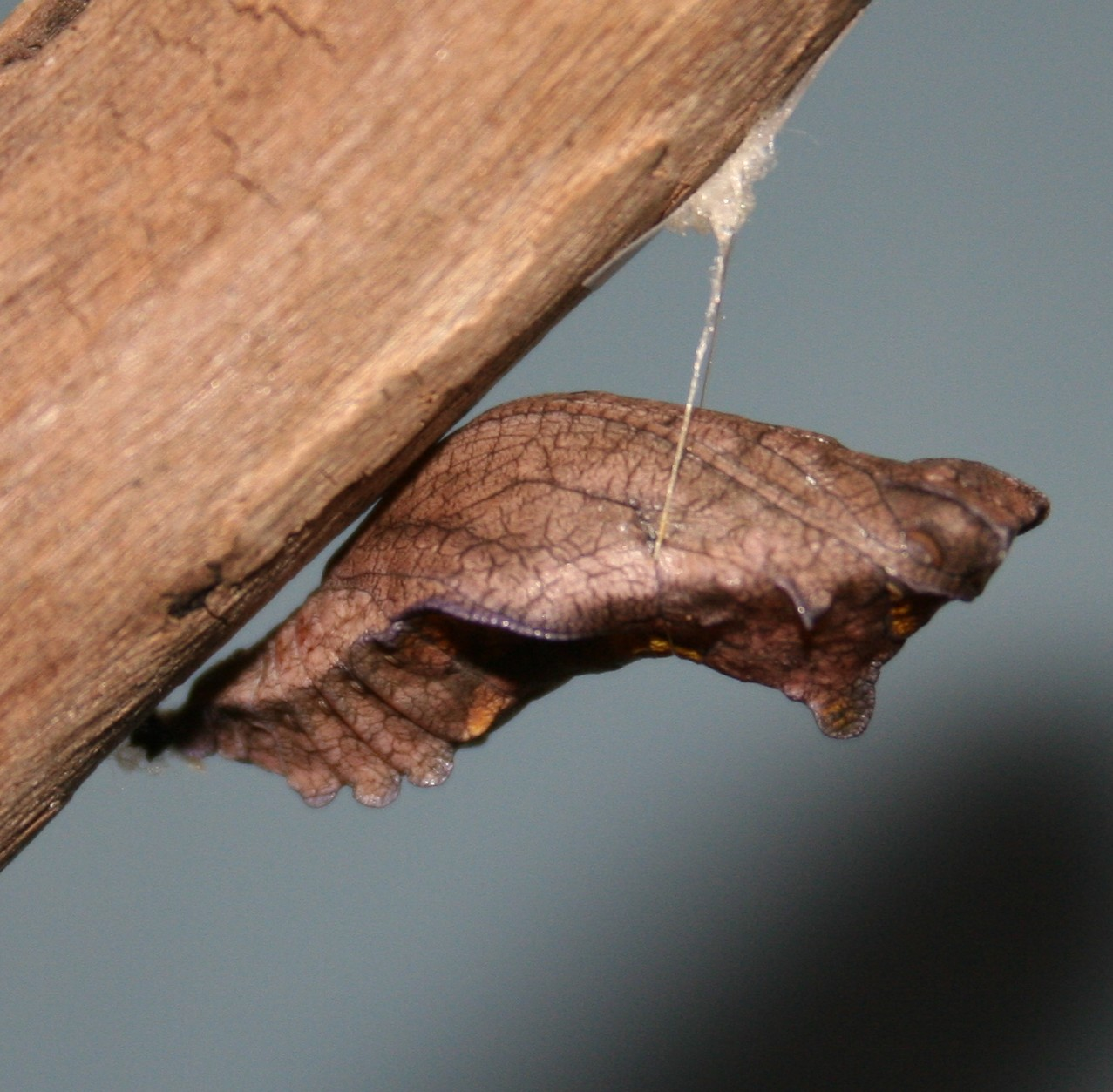
Pipevine swallowtail chrysalis

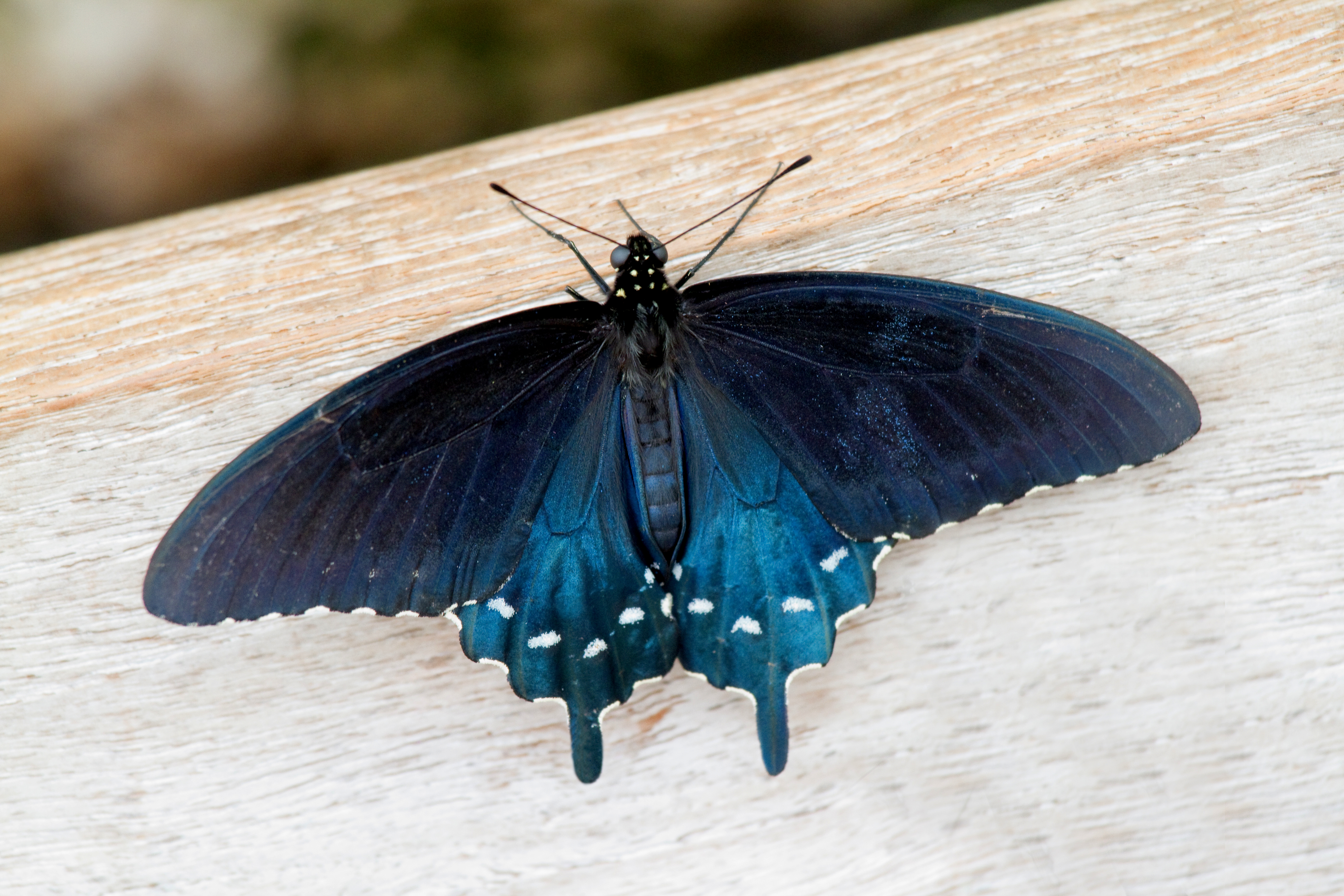
Pipevine swallowtail dorsal view

== Mating ==
=== Mating process ===
Males frequently visit host plants to find females. Once found, males spend a long time hovering above the female, and courtship occurs as the male fans the female with pheromones from above. The males' iridescent hind wings are also believed to be involved in attracting females. Males may also use sodium taken up from mud as a nuptial gift during mating.

=== Oviposition ===
Females identify host plants on which to lay their eggs by leaf shape, which can lead to mistakes in egg laying and thus compromising the eggs' survival rates. Aristolochic acid presence may also act as an oviposition chemical stimulant.

== Natural enemies ==
The pipevine swallowtail larva has few natural predators but there have been observed cases of other butterfly larvae feeding on swallowtail larva. Parasites can also threaten larvae, with certain fly and wasp species being the most dangerous. Birds are the greatest threat to larvae, as many species will eat them whenever they can. As a result of bird predation, this butterfly has evolved a chemical defense using the aristolochic acids found in their host plants.

== Defense ==
All host plants for the pipevine swallowtail have some form of aristolochic acids, which the larva sequesters while they feed. These acids are passed on to future eggs, pupa, and adult butterflies, so over generations, the level of acid in the body of the butterflies rises as the acid accumulates. High levels of acid make the larvae and adults unpalatable to bird predation. Other predators also include anole lizards and, in rare cases, lady beetle larvae.The bright orange spots present on larvae and adult butterflies are thought to serve as warnings to predators, alerting them to the potential bad taste, should the predator decide to make a meal out of the swallowtail.

== Mimicry ==
As a result of the pipevine swallowtails' natural defense through acid sequestering, many other species of butterflies, like the red-spotted purple butterfly, female eastern tiger swallowtail and eastern black swallowtail butterflies, promothea silkmoth males and the spicebush swallowtail use the pipevine swallowtail as a template for mimicry. Several other swallowtail subspecies have similar coloring to the pipevine swallowtail so that predators may also associate them with distaste. This is called Batesian mimicry. Pipevine swallowtails may also be involved with Müllerian mimicry, in which two distasteful species resemble each other, and thus act as a mimic and model; certain millipede species look like pipevine larvae and release hydrogen cyanide when in danger.

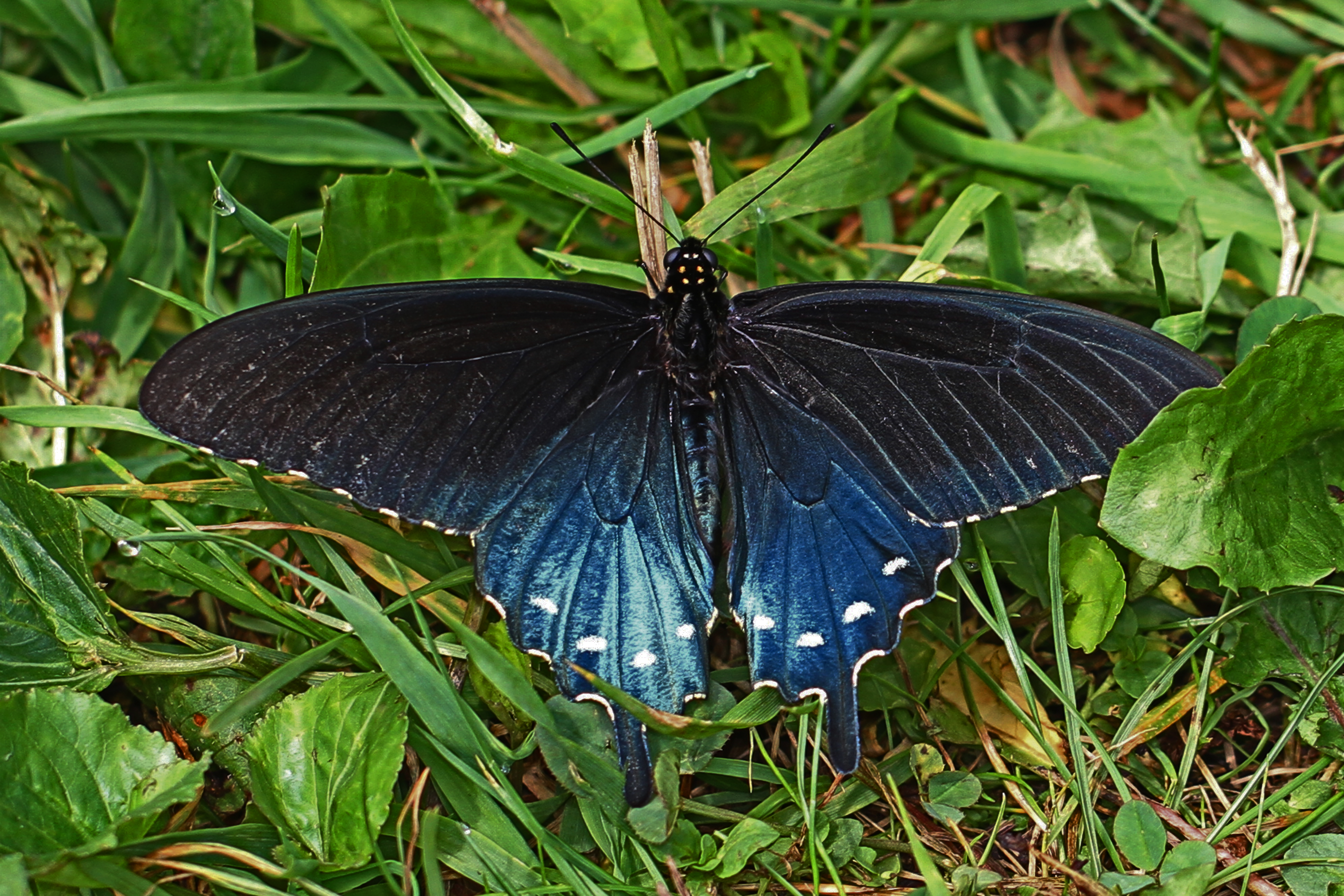
Pipevine swallowtail UP (model)

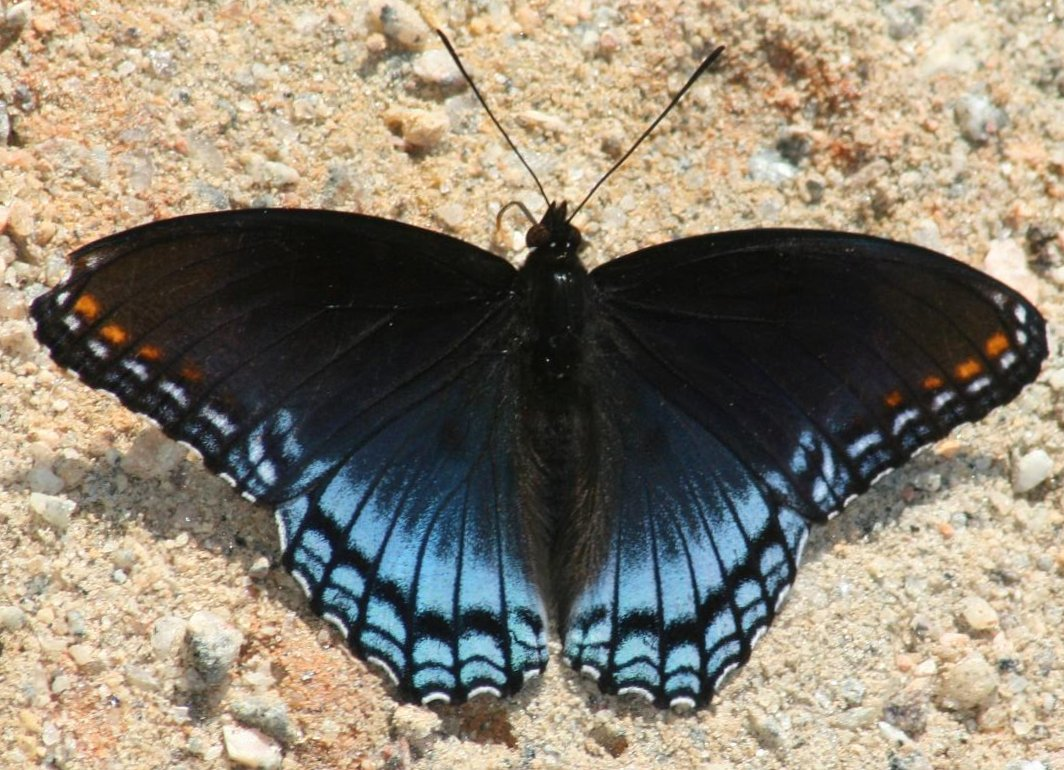
Red spotted purple butterfly UP (mimic)

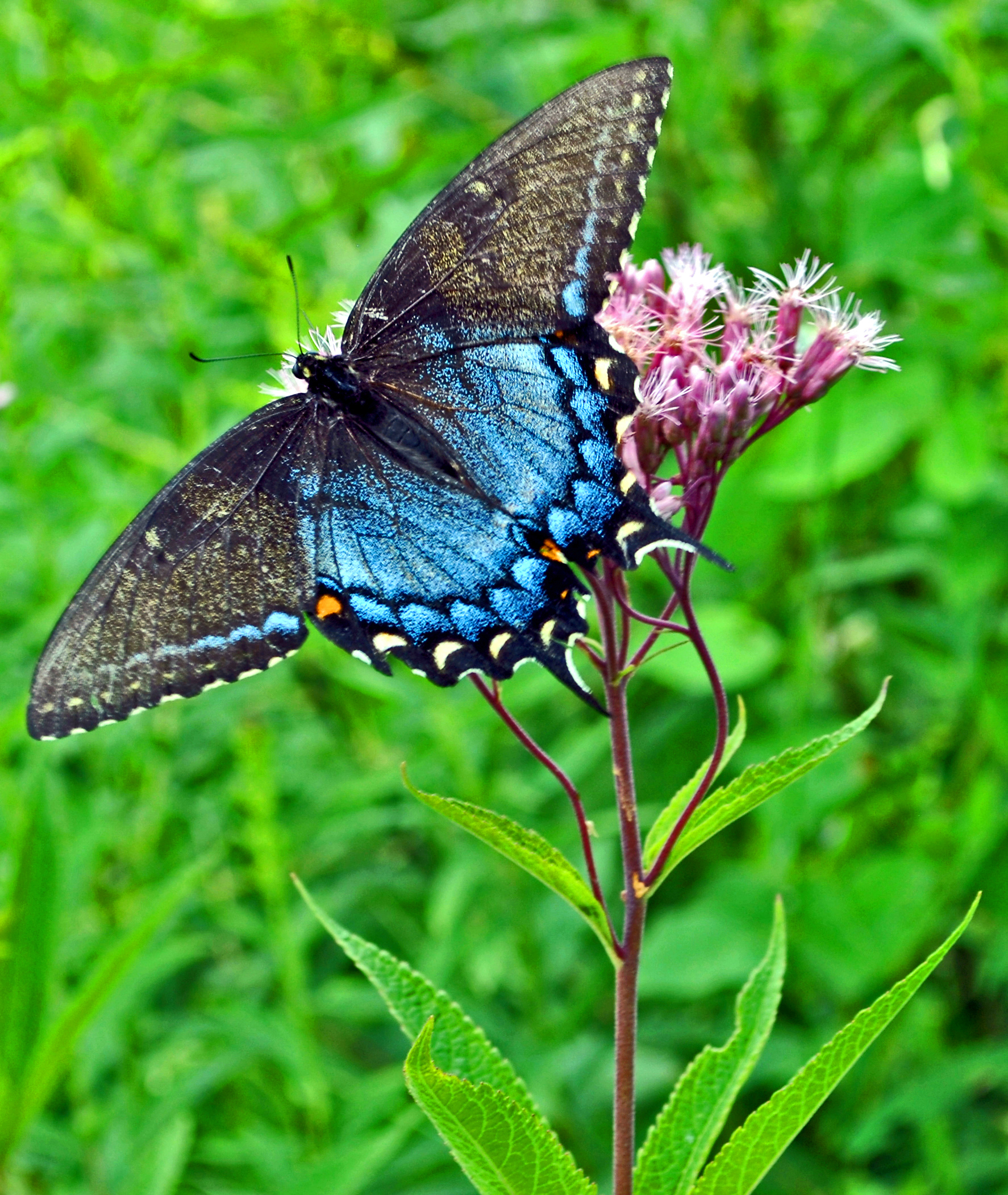
Female eastern tiger swallowtail UP (mimic)

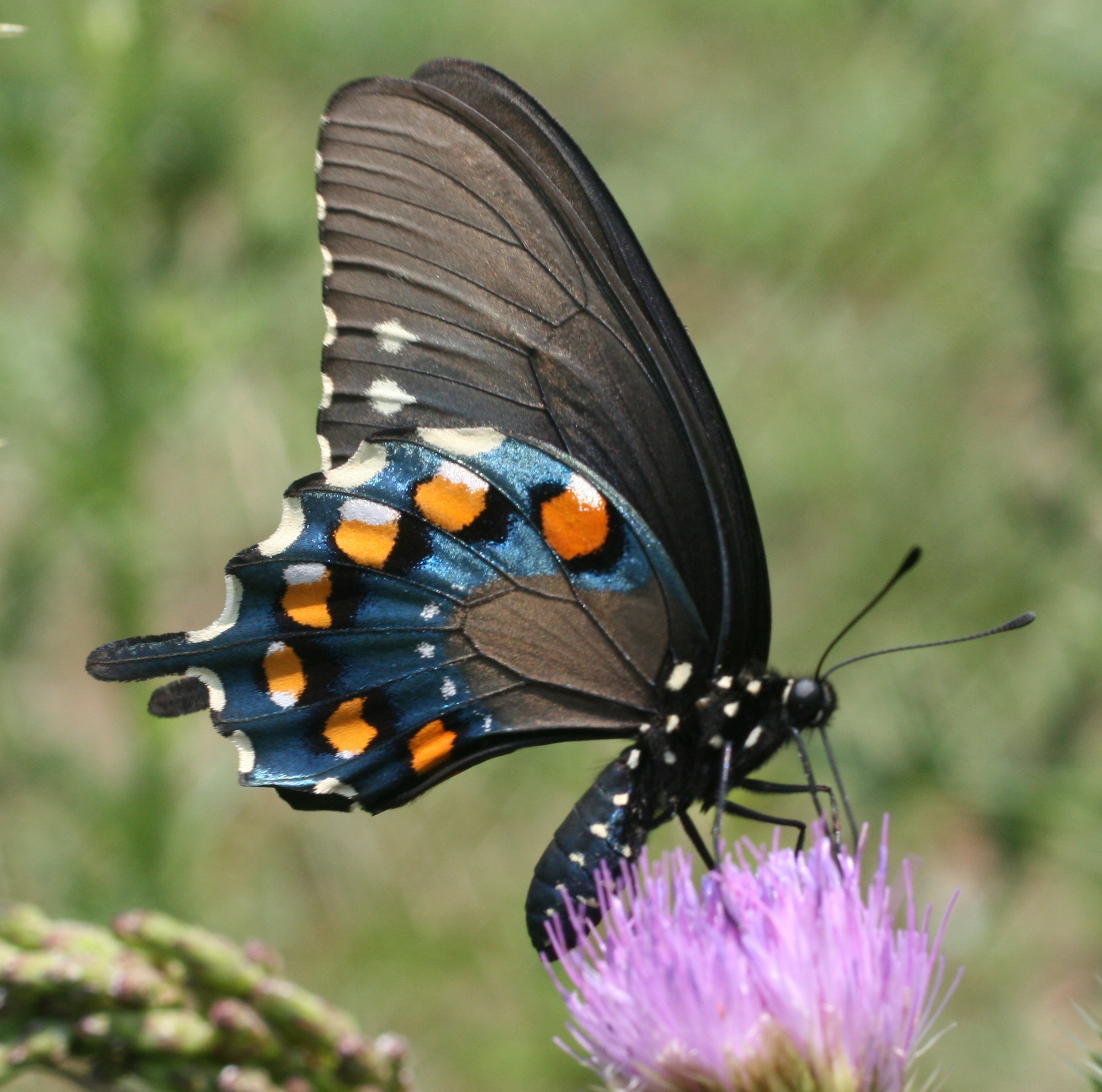
Pipevine swallowtail UN (model)

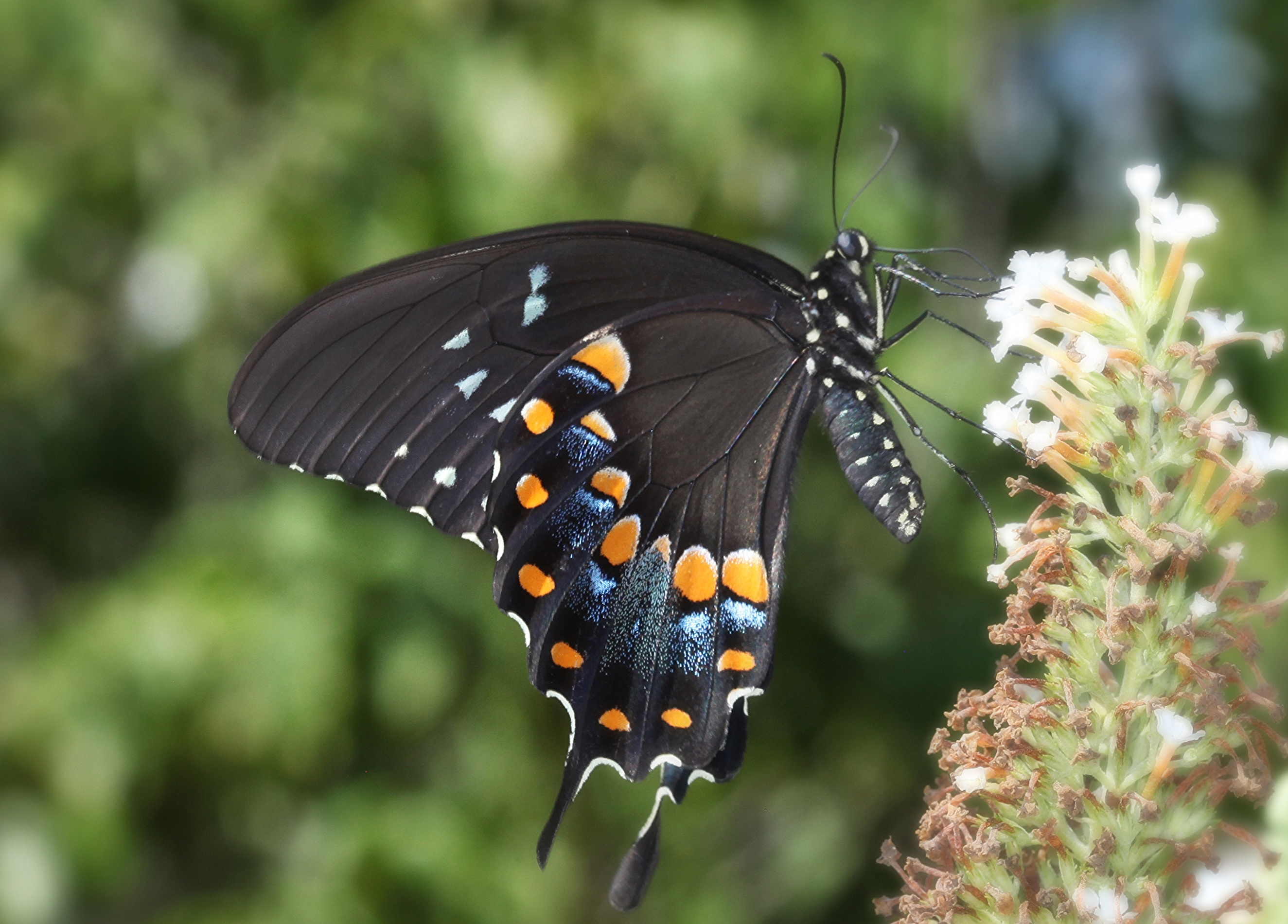
Spicebush swallowtail UN (mimic)

== Subspecies ==
- Battus philenor hirsuta
