= Crinodes biedermani =

Scientific classification
- Kingdom: Animalia
- Phylum: Arthropoda
- Class: Insecta
- Order: Lepidoptera
- Superfamily: Noctuoidea
- Family: Notodontidae
- Tribe: Dudusini
- Genus: Crinodes
- Species: C. biedermani

Binomial name
- Crinodes biedermani Skinner, 1905

Species of moth

Crinodes biedermani is a species of moth in the family Notodontidae (the prominents). It was first described by Skinner in 1905 and it is found in North America.

The MONA or Hodges number for Crinodes biedermani is 8028.
