= Henry Skinner =

Henry Skinner may refer to:

- Henry Skinner (businessman), Australian businessman
- Henry Skinner (cricketer) (born 1921, date of death unknown), Barbadian cricketer
- Henry Skinner (entomologist) (1861–1926), American entomologist
- Henry Skinner (judge), British barrister and judge
- Henry Alan Skinner (1899–?), Canadian anatomist and classical scholar
- Harry Skinner (ethnologist) (1886–1978), New Zealand ethnologist
- Hank Skinner (1962–2023), American convicted murderer
