= Battus philenor hirsuta =

Scientific classification
- Kingdom: Animalia
- Phylum: Arthropoda
- Clade: Pancrustacea
- Class: Insecta
- Order: Lepidoptera
- Family: Papilionidae
- Genus: Battus
- Species: B. philenor
- Subspecies: B. p. hirsuta

Trinomial name
- Battus philenor hirsuta Skinner, 1908

Subspecies of butterfly

Battus philenor hirsuta, the California pipevine swallowtail or hairy pipevine swallowtail, is a subspecies of the pipevine swallowtail that is endemic to Northern California in the United States. The butterfly is black with hindwings that have iridescent green-blue coloring above and a row of orange spots below; the caterpillars are black with fleshy protrusions and rows of orange spikes. It feeds solely on Aristolchia californica, the California pipevine. The subspecies is smaller in size, hairier, and lays eggs in larger clutch sizes than the other subspecies of Battus philenor.

== Taxonomy ==
The species Battus philenor was described by biologist Linnaeus in 1771, who placed it in the Papilo genus. It was later moved to the Battus genus by Scopoli in 1777. Using specimens from Plumas County in 1908, Henry Skinner classifed a newfound variety of the species Papilo philenor, and named it the Papilo philenor hirsuta. He noted that this subspecies has longer hairs than other pipevine swallowtails, and thus used hirsuta to name the subspecies, which in Latin translates to English as rough or hairy.

== Behavior ==
The egg clutches of this butterfly are deposited on the shoot tips of the A. californica, or the California pipevine, a perennial vine native to riparian, chaparral, and woodland ecosystems of the California Coast Ranges, Sacramento Valley, and Sierra Nevada foothills. The larvae feed exclusively on the foliage and shoot tips of the pipevine, although adults eat floral nectar from a variety of plants.

The pipevine swallowtail, like other Battus philenor, is an ovipositer. B. philenor hirsuta is known to only oviposit on A. californica, the pipevine, though it has been observed to mistakenly oviposit on plants with similar leaf shapes. This mistake leads to larvae death as B. philenor hirsuta can only survive on the California pipvine. The plant contains a toxic substance called aristolochic acid. The larvae sequester the toxin as a defense, and both the juvenile and adult butterflies have high concentrations of the aristolochic acid in their tissues. Like other Battus philenor species, the blue iridescence and the orange spots of the California pipevine swallowtail have an aposematic function in warning predators of its toxicity. Other butterflies and moths mimic the distinctive coloration of the pipevine swallowtail to avoid predators; however, there are no known mimics of this Californian subspecies.

== Distribution and habitat ==
Populations of the California pipevine swallowtail are found throughout the Sacramento Valley and outside of the valley in Contra Costa and Alameda counties. These populations are isolated from other pipevine swallowtail populations, making it a separate subspecies.

The host plant species of B. philenor hirsuta, the California pipevine, is thought to have been part of Northern California's ancient flora back to the Pleistocene era. However, it is still unknown if the California population of the pipevine swallowtail had existed during that time, or if its presence in California had been a more recent development.

=== Return to San Francisco ===
The species' presence was drastically reduced in San Francisco, but was being brought back as of 2017, through efforts mainly attributed to Tim Wong, an aquatic biologist at the California Academy of Sciences. He gathered caterpillars from nearby areas and raised them in his backyard. He also used the butterflies he raised to repopulate the San Francisco Botanical Garden.
