= Emily Skinner =

Emily Skinner may refer to:

- Emily Skinner (actress, born 1970), American Tony-nominated stage actress from Virginia
- Emily Skinner (actress, born 2002), American actress from California; known for her roles as Amber in Disney Channel's Andi Mack and Diana in Brat's Total Eclipse

== See also ==
- Emily (disambiguation)
- Skinner (surname)
