= Thomas Skinner =

Thomas or Tom Skinner may refer to:

== Politicians ==
- Thomas Skinner (died c. 1411), MP for Shrewsbury
- Thomas Skinner (Lord Mayor of London, 1596), clothworker, Alderman, and Lord Mayor of London
- Thomas Skinner (Lord Mayor of London, 1794), Lord Mayor of London
- Thomas Gregory Skinner (1842–1907), US representative from North Carolina

== Other people ==
- Thomas Skinner (historical writer) or Skynner (c. 1629–1679), Colchester physician and historical writer
- Thomas Skinner, plaintiff in Skinner's Case, 1668-9
- Thomas Skinner (British Army officer, born 1759) (1759–1818), British Army military engineer officer
- Thomas Skinner (British Army officer, died 1843) (c. 1800–1843), British Army officer and author
- Thomas Skinner (British Army officer, born 1804) (1804–1877), British Army officer, commissioner of public works in Ceylon
- Thomas Skinner (etcher) (1819–1881), English etcher, inventor, and amateur oil-painter
- Sir Thomas Skinner, 1st Baronet (1840–1926), British-born financial writer, publisher, and businessman, director of the Canadian Pacific Railway, governor of the Hudson's Bay Company
- Thomas Edward Barnes Skinner (1840–1902), British Postmaster General of Ceylon
- Thomas Skinner (sailor), British 1928 Olympian sailor
- Tom Skinner (trade unionist) (1909–1991), New Zealand trade unionist
- Tom Skinner (minister) (1942–1994), American evangelist minister and motivational speaker
- Thomas Skinner (television executive), American television and film executive
- Tom Skinner (drummer) (born 1980), English musician and music producer
- Thomas Skinner (businessman) (born 1991), English businessman
