= Charles Skinner =

Charles Skinner may refer to:

- Charles R. Skinner (1844–1928), U.S. representative from New York
- Charles Montgomery Skinner (1852–1907), American writer
- Charles Nelson Skinner (1833–1910), Canadian lawyer, judge, and politician
- Charles Skinner (geologist)
- Charlie Skinner (1912–1972), Australian rules footballer
