= Harry Skinner =

Harry Skinner may refer to:

- Harry Skinner (dancer), dancer with the Royal New Zealand Ballet
- Harry Skinner (ethnologist) (1886–1978), New Zealand soldier, ethnologist, university lecturer, museum curator, and librarian
- Harry Skinner (footballer) (fl. 1878–?), English professional footballer
- Harry Skinner (politician) (1855–1929), U.S. Representative from North Carolina

== See also ==
- Henry Skinner (disambiguation)
