= William Skinner =

William Skinner may refer to:

- William Skinner (MP) (1596–1627), MP for Great Grimsby, 1626
- William Skinner (British Army officer) (1700–1780), British military engineer
- William Skinner (North Carolina general) (1728–1798), general in the North Carolina militia during the American Revolution
- William Skinner (bishop) (1778–1857), bishop of Aberdeen in the Scottish Episcopal Church
- William Skinner (ethnographer) (1857–1946), New Zealand surveyor, historian, and ethnographer
- William I. Skinner (1812–1891), American politician from New York
- G. William Skinner (1925–2008), American anthropologist and scholar of China
- William W. Skinner (1874–1953), American chemist, conservationist, and college football coach
- William C. Skinner (1855–1922), president of Colt's Manufacturing Company
- William Henry Skinner (1838–1915), Welsh architect who migrated to New Zealand
- William Skinner of Corra (1823–1901), town clerk of Edinburgh
- William Skinner (EastEnders), fictional character from EastEnders spin-off "CivvyStreet"
- William Skinner (hurdler) (born 1964), American hurdler, 1986 All-American for the Maryland Terrapins track and field team

== See also ==
- Will Skinner (disambiguation)
- Bill Skinner (1939–2015), American javelin thrower
