= James Skinner =

James Skinner may refer to:

- James Skinner (MP) (died 1558), MP for Reigate
- James Skinner (missionary) (died 1821) English missionary and translator, see J. V. S. Taylor
- James Skinner (East India Company officer) (1778–1841), Anglo-Indian soldier, founder of cavalry regiments, Skinner's Horse and 3rd Skinner's Horse
- James Atchison Skinner (1826–1894), Scottish-born farmer, merchant and political figure in Ontario, Canada
- James Scott Skinner (1843–1927), Scottish fiddler and dancing master
- J. Allen Skinner (1890–1974), British trade unionist and pacifist
- Jimmy Skinner (footballer) (1898–1984), English footballer
- Jimmy Skinner (1917–2007), ice hockey coach
- Jimmy Skinner (American football) (born 1984), American football coach and quarterback
- James John Skinner (1923–2008), Irish-born Zambian and Malawian jurist
- James A. Skinner (born 1944), former CEO of McDonald's
- James Skinner (CANZUK International) (fl. 2011–2018), executive director of CANZUK International
- James L. Skinner (born 1953), American theoretical chemist
