= Michael Skinner =

Michael or Mike Skinner may refer to:

- Mike Skinner (racing driver) (born 1957), American NASCAR competitor, inaugural NASCAR Truck Series champion
- Michael Skinner (rugby union) (born 1958), former English rugby player
- Mike Skinner (musician) (born 1978), British rapper/musician who performed using the stage name, The Streets
- Michael Skinner (biologist) (born 1956), American molecular biologist and fertility specialist
- Michael Skinner (magician) (1941–1998), American close-up magician
