= David Skinner =

David Skinner may refer to:

- David Skinner (journalist) (born 1973), journalist and editor of Humanities magazine and previously of The Weekly Standard
- David Skinner (cricketer) (1920–1998), English cricketer
- David Skinner (producer) (born 1946), American film producer
- David Skinner (musician), British musician and songwriter
- David Skinner (musicologist) (born 1964), Director of Music at Sidney Sussex, Cambridge, and founder of Alamire
- David E. Skinner II (1920–1988), shipping heir and philanthropist in Seattle, Washington
- David Arthur Skinner (born 1980), British pianist, bandleader, and composer
- David Ray Skinner (born 1952), writer, illustrator, singer/songwriter, graphic designer and e-publisher of SouthernReader.com
