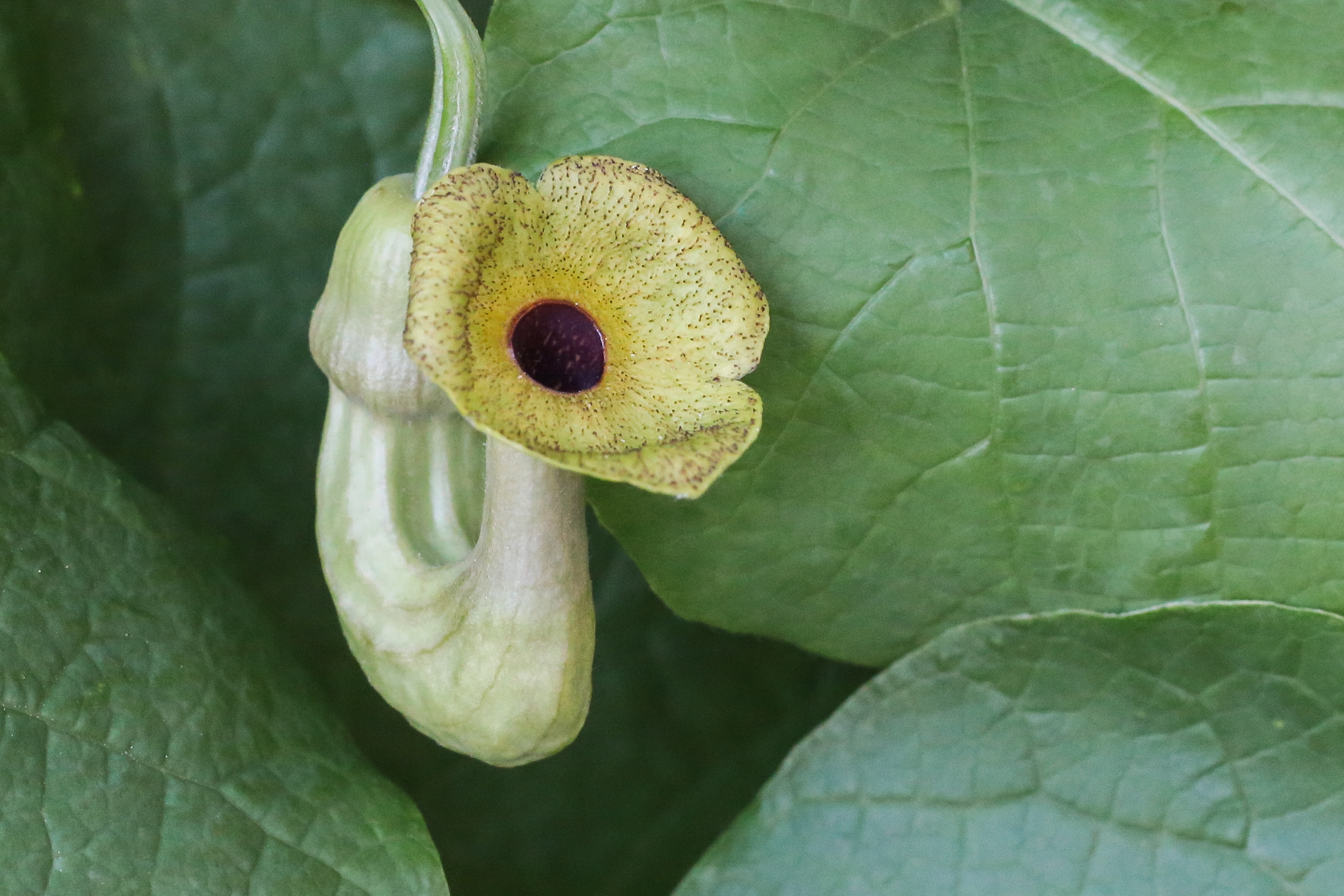

Scientific classification
- Kingdom: Plantae
- Clade: Tracheophytes
- Clade: Angiosperms
- Clade: Magnoliids
- Order: Piperales
- Family: Aristolochiaceae
- Genus: Aristolochia
- Species: A. macrophylla

Binomial name
- Aristolochia macrophylla Lam.

Synonyms
- Aristolochia arkasana Lodd., nom. nud.; Aristolochia durior Hill; Aristolochia frutescens Marshall; Aristolochia grandifolia Salisb.; Aristolochia hitchcockii Gand.; Aristolochia sipho L'Hér.; Hocquartia macrophylla Dumort.; Isiphia glabra Raf.; Isotrema macrophyllum (Lam.) C.F.Reed; Isotrema sipho (L'Hér.) Raf., not validly publ.; Siphisia glabra Raf.; Siphisia macrophylla (Lam.) Asch.; Siphisia sipho (L'Hér.) Klotzsch

= Aristolochia macrophylla =

Species of vine

Aristolochia macrophylla, Dutchman's pipe or pipevine, is a perennial vine native to the eastern United States. A. macrophylla belongs to the plant family Aristolochiaceae and is found primarily along the Cumberland Mountains and Blue Ridge Mountains in the eastern portion of the United States, as well as Ontario, Canada. This species of plant has received considerable attention in the past few decades for the discovery of a potent compound called aristolochic acid, which has been the focus of debate due its harmful side effects.

Aside from its decorative qualities, owing to its large leaves and dense growth, it is cultivated in gardens because it is a larval host for the pipevine swallowtail, Battus philenor.

== Description ==
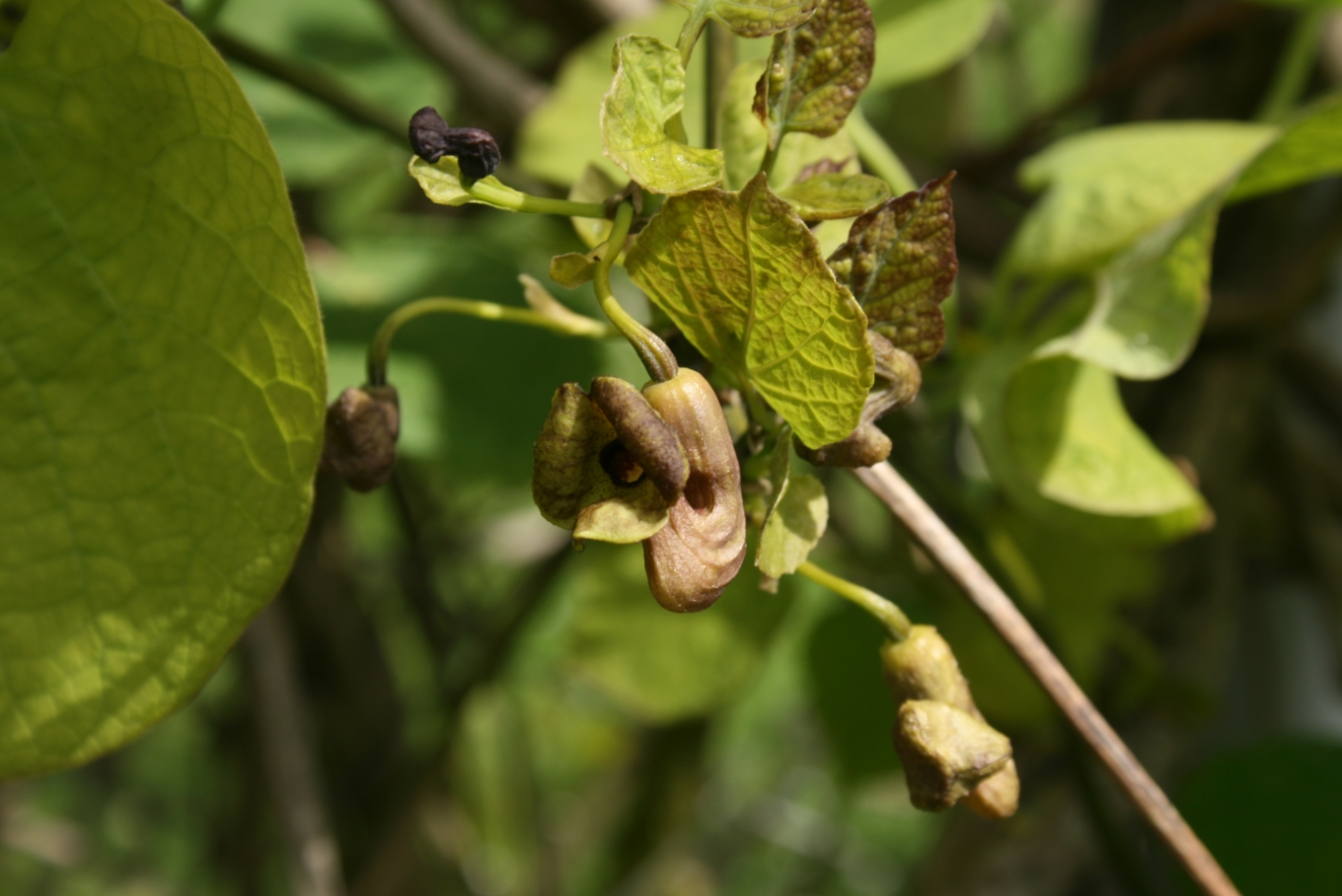
Flower of Aristolochia macrophylla

This vine is a flowering plant that can grow up to 9 metres (30 ft) at a relatively fast rate. In the early stages of its development, the vines of A. macrophylla are very stiff and rigid, but as the plant develops, the vines become much more flexible and stable. This is because the plant is composed of sclerenchymatous cortical tissue, which has an outer cylinder, or layer, as well as an inner cylinder. Years of research showed that it is the outer sclerenchymatous cylinder that gives the stems of this plant its mechanical stability. This species flowers between the months of June and August in the U.S. with its seeds ripening in September and October. The large heart-shaped leaves can range between 15–30 cm (6–12 in). These dark green leaves can overlap and cover an arbor or trellis. Plants can also be used to provide extensive covers for pillars, sun porches, fences, walls as well as other things.

=== Flowers and fruit ===
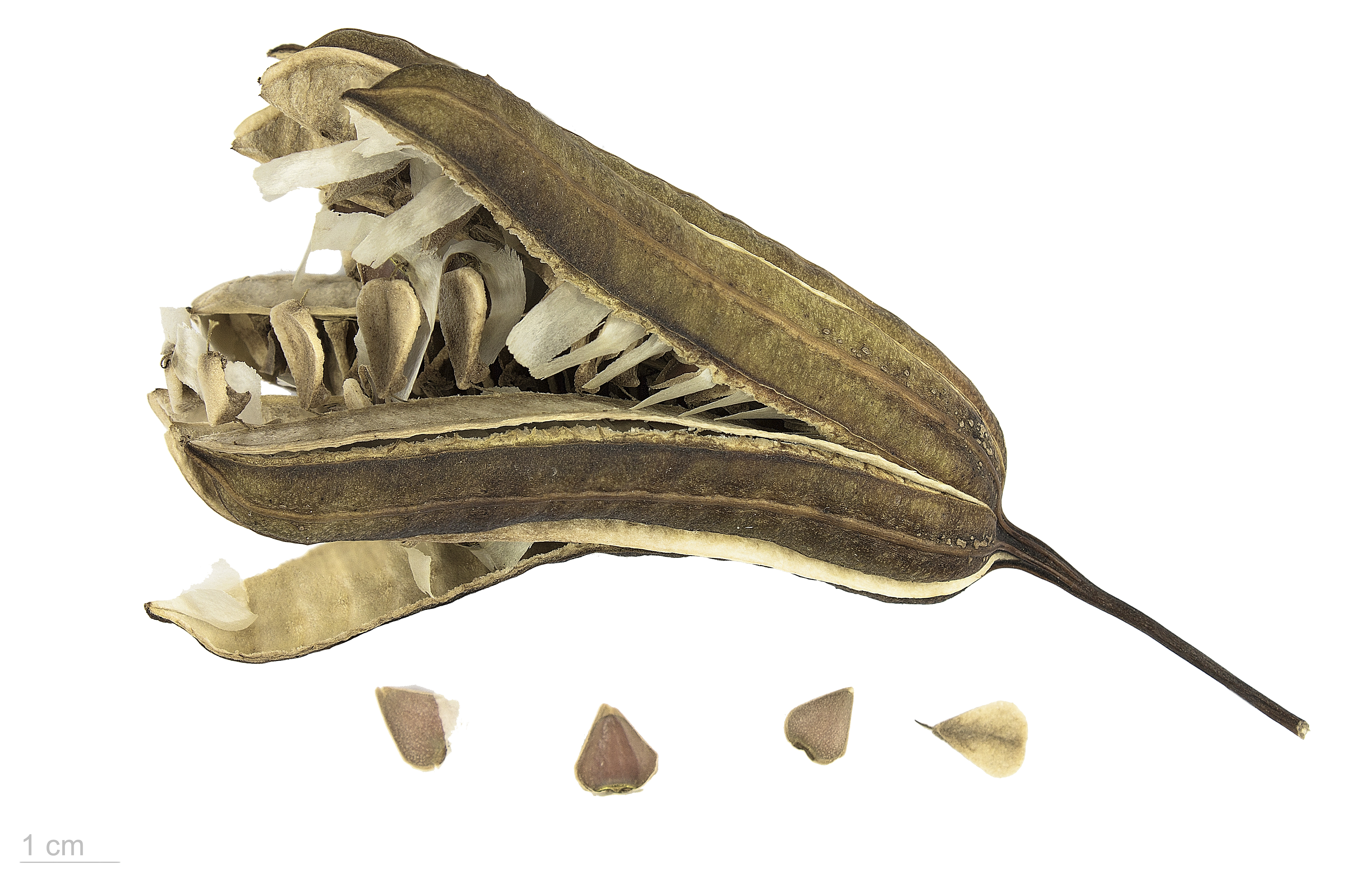
Aristolochia macrophylla - MHNT

The reason why A. macrophylla is often referred to as "Dutchman's pipe" is because of the 5 cm (2 in) yellowish-green flowers they produce. Each flower also sprouts from the calyx mouth to further produce 3 brownish-purple lobes. It is this complex of the flowers and lobes that gives the species a close resemblance to Dutch smoking pipes. The flowers may be hidden by the thick vegetation of the pipevine.

The flowers start to open up in May and June in the U.S. and the fragrant flowers attract small flies and gnats. Once an insect has arrived to the flower, the insect is trapped inside a tube, which forces the insect to carry out pollination. Once pollination has been completed and time has passed since pollination, a fruit resembling a cucumber, between 6–10 cm in height, and 3 cm in diameter is produced. The fruit then ripens, usually around September in the U.S., turns brown and splits into six fragments to disperse its small, triangular seeds.

== Distribution ==
A. macrophylla has a relatively wide distribution. It is found from Maine to Alabama, and reaches all the way to Georgia, Tennessee and Kansas. The plant species generally ranges from the Eastern region of the United States up to Michigan, with the exception of Ohio, Indiana and Illinois, and reaches the southeast up until Florida where the presence of this species comes to an abrupt halt. It is also common in Mississippi and Alabama all the way up north to Maine and Ontario, Canada. A. macrophylla is considered to be a threatened species in Maryland. Although the species is not endangered yet, the pipevine could be well on its way to endangerment if measures are not taken to protect this species from the negative consequences of deforestation and other aspects of human disturbance.

== Habitat and ecology ==
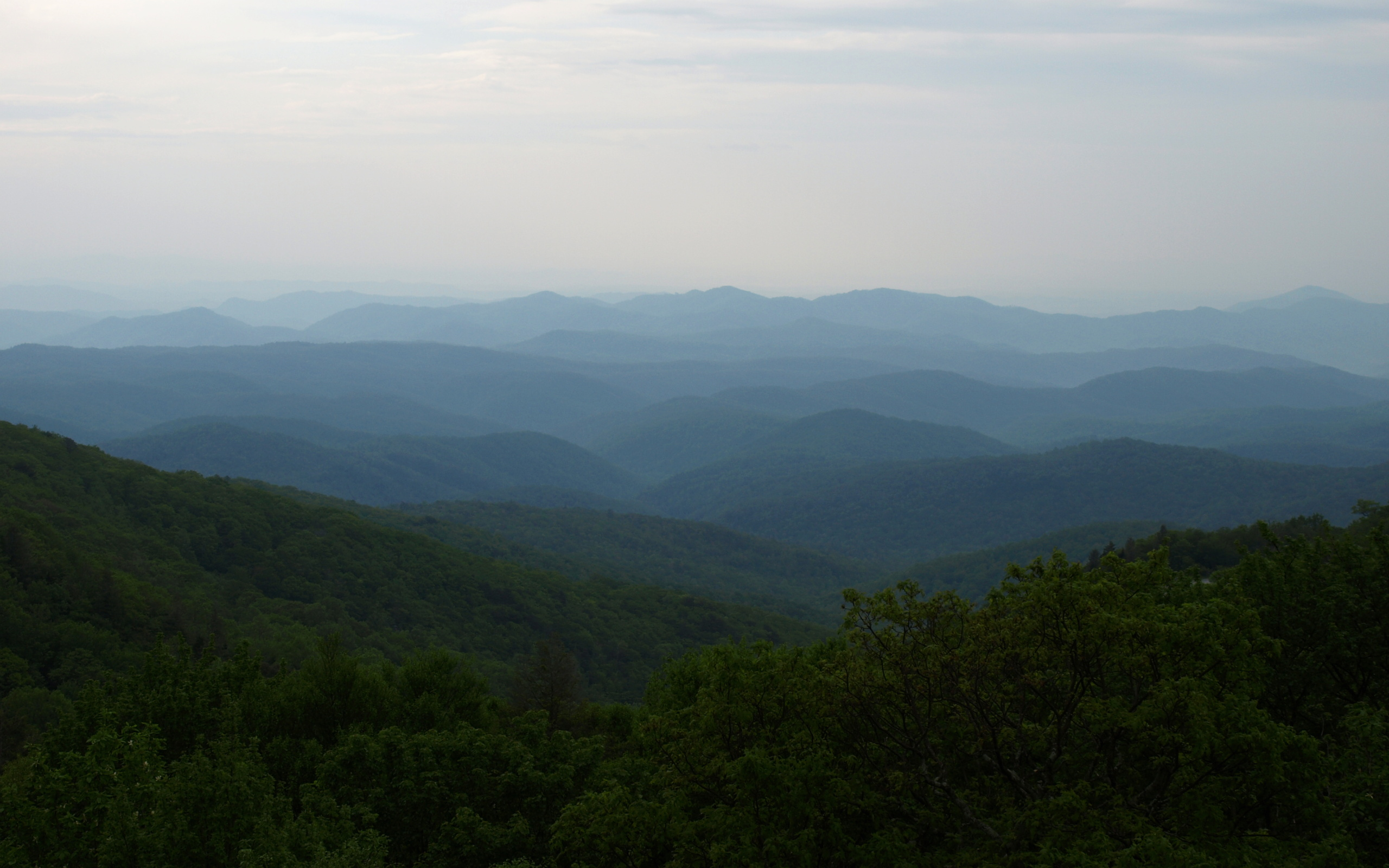
Blue Ridge Mountains

A. macrophylla is native to the southeast of the United States, however it is also found in the northeast, as well as Ontario, Canada. This plant species resides largely in the Cumberland and Blue Ridge Mountains of southeastern United States. They are native to wooded slopes, gaps, as well as ravines which are mainly in the Cumberland and Blue Ridge Mountains from West Virginia, to Kentucky, Tennessee and northern Georgia. Pipevine eventually spread to other parts of the eastern coast of the United States. A. macrophylla is naturally found in light sandy soil, medium loamy soil and heavy clay soils, with a preference for drained soils. This species is also primarily found in alkaline soils with high pH. A. macrophylla has a strong preference for moist soils, while being intolerant to dry soils.
