= Aristolochia watsonii =

Scientific classification
- Kingdom: Plantae
- Clade: Tracheophytes
- Clade: Angiosperms
- Clade: Magnoliids
- Order: Piperales
- Family: Aristolochiaceae
- Genus: Aristolochia
- Species: A. watsonii

Binomial name
- Aristolochia watsonii Wooton & Standl.

Synonyms
- Aristolochia porphyrophylla Pfeifer

Species of vine

Aristolochia watsonii (Watson's Dutchman's pipe, southwestern pipevine, Indian root, snakeroot) is a perennial plant in the birthwort family (Aristolochiaceae), found growing among plants of the Arizona Uplands in the Sonoran Desert. The plant is inconspicuous, small and hard to spot, but can be found by following the pipevine swallowtail (blue swallowtail, Battus philenor) which lays eggs on it.

== Description ==
=== Growth pattern ===
It grows as vine with scrambling stems that create a dense, tangled mat over the years when growing on open ground.

=== Roots, stems, and leaves ===
According to one source, stems are 150 to 450 mm (6 to 18 in) long, with greenish-brown arrowhead-shaped 5 to 65 mm (1/4 to 2 1/2 in) leaves. Another source states stems can reach 0.9 m (3 ft), in dense mats that are 0.3 to 0.6 m (1 to 2 ft) wide. It drops its leaves in the fall and winter (cold-deciduous), and loses stems as well as leaves in a freeze. In full sun and drought conditions, leaves turn from green to purple-brown.

=== Inflorescence and fruit ===
It has "bizarre" looking, musky-smelling flowers, which resemble the ear of a rodent. It blooms from April to October. 25 to 40 mm (1 to 1 1/2 in) flowers are shaped like a rodent's ear are green or burgundy-brown outside to the ear rim, then green speckled with burgundy-brown inside, with hairs on the opening ear rim. Flowers last 1–2 days.

Fruits are capsules having five vertical ribs with triangular-shaped flat and black seeds in each of five compartments.

=== Ecological interactions ===
Flowers shaped and smelling like a rodent's ear attract small blood-sucking flies, which are deceived by the appearance and odor and get trapped in the convoluted flower form for a day, then escape to pollinate another plant. It attracts the pipevine swallowtail, and is where the butterfly gets its distasteful toxins that protect the butterfly from predation. The caterpillar may eat all of the leaves on a plant, but they then grow back.

=== Toxicity ===
All parts of this plant are toxic to humans.

== Habitat and Distribution ==
It is found from Arizona to western Texas, in mountains at elevations from 600 to 1,400 m (2,000 to 4,500 ft).

== Human use ==
Native Americans believed it could be used to treat snakebites, hence its common names Indian root or snakeroot. It is currently found in some nurseries that feature native plants as it is a good landscape plant in a butterfly garden.
