= Edward Skinner =

Edward Skinner may refer to

- Edward Skinner (architect) (1869–1910), British architect who practiced in Ceylon
- Edward Skinner (cricketer) (1847–1919), English first-class cricketer

== See also ==
- Edward Skinner King (1861–1931), American astronomer
