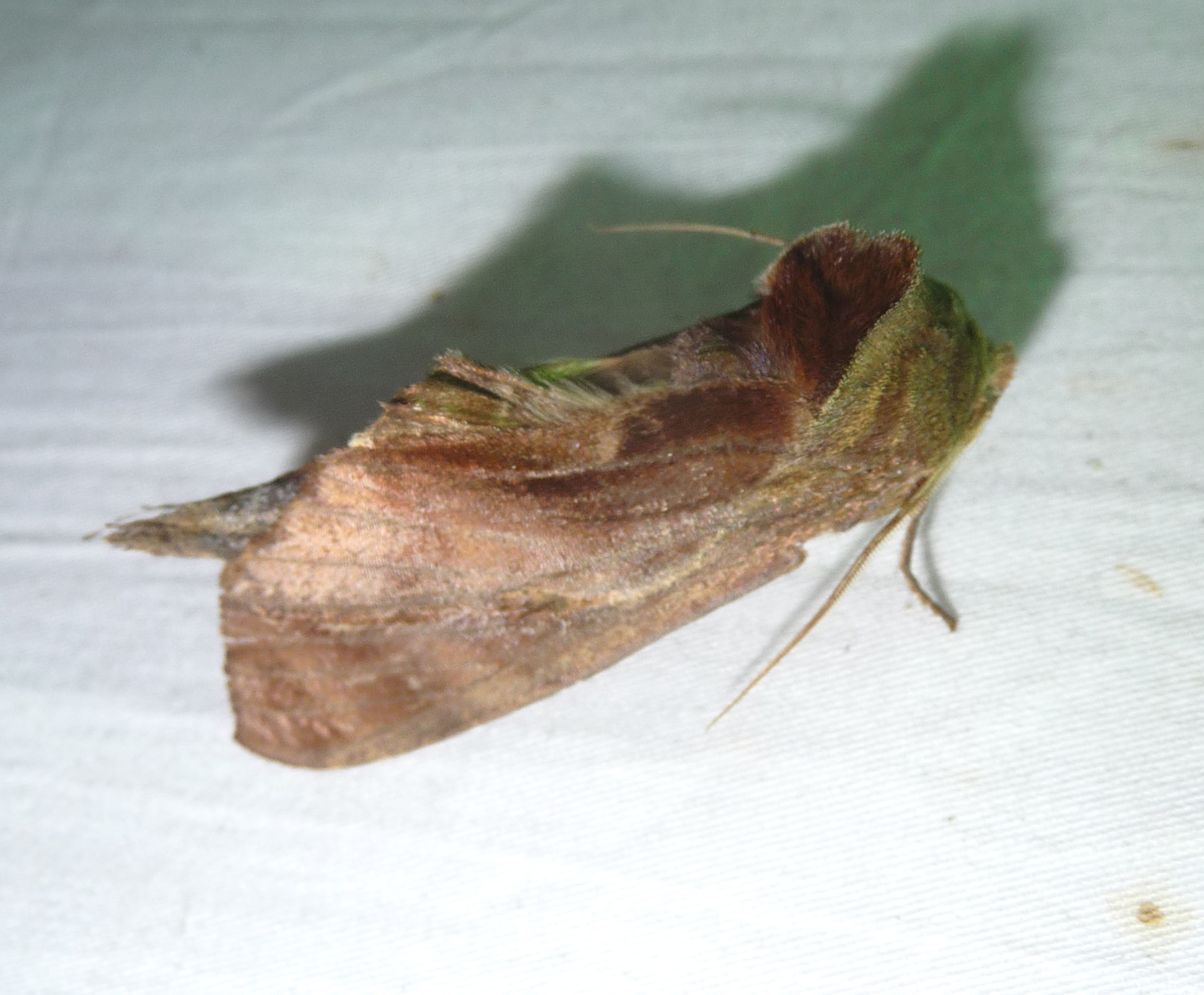
- Crinodes besckei

Scientific classification
- Domain: Eukaryota
- Kingdom: Animalia
- Phylum: Arthropoda
- Class: Insecta
- Order: Lepidoptera
- Superfamily: Noctuoidea
- Family: Notodontidae
- Tribe: Dudusini
- Genus: Crinodes; Herrich-Schäffer, 1855

= Crinodes =

Genus of moths

Crinodes is a genus of moths of the family Notodontidae erected by Gottlieb August Wilhelm Herrich-Schäffer in 1855.

== Selected species ==
- Crinodes biedermani (Skinner, 1905) (sometimes placed in Astylis)
