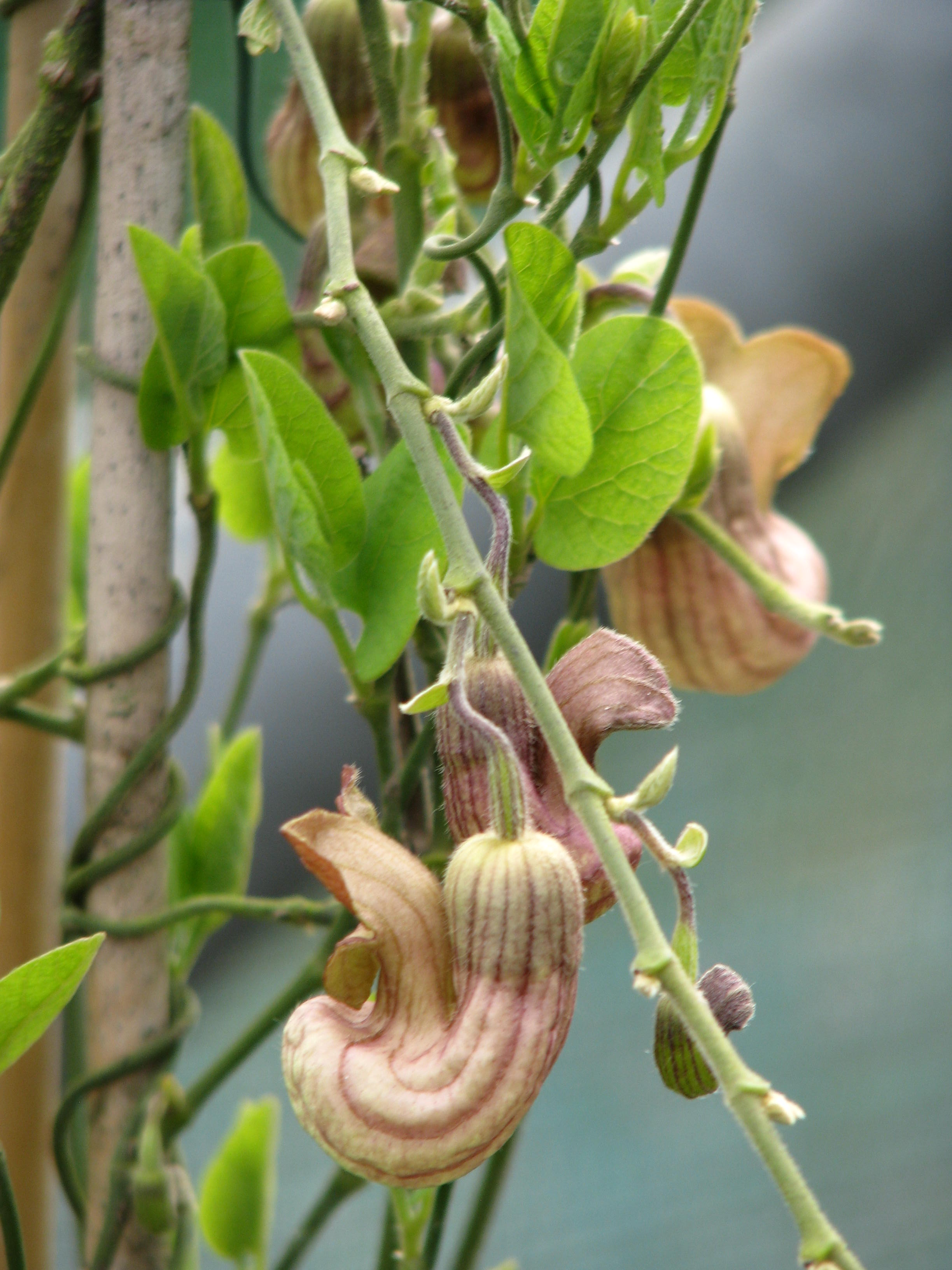

Conservation status
- Apparently Secure (NatureServe)

Scientific classification
- Kingdom: Plantae
- Clade: Embryophytes
- Clade: Tracheophytes
- Clade: Spermatophytes
- Clade: Angiosperms
- Clade: Magnoliids
- Order: Piperales
- Family: Aristolochiaceae
- Genus: Aristolochia
- Species: A. californica

Binomial name
- Aristolochia californica Torr

= Aristolochia californica =

Species of flowering plant

Aristolochia californica, the California pipevine, California Dutchman's-pipe, or California snakeroot is a perennial woody vine of western North America.

== Distribution and habitat ==
The vine is endemic to northern California. It is native to the Sacramento Valley, northern Sierra Nevada foothills, San Francisco Bay Area, Northern Inner California Coast Ranges, southeastern Klamath Mountains.

The plant grows along riparian streambank areas, in chaparral, oak woodland, and mixed evergreen forest habitats. It is found below 700 metres (2,300 ft) in elevation.

== Description ==
Aristolochia californica is a deciduous vine. It grows from rhizomes, to a length usually around 5 feet (1.5 m), but can reach over 20 feet (6.1 m). The twining trunk can become quite thick in circumference at maturity.

It sends out new green heart-shaped leaves after it blooms. The bloom period is January through April.

The plant produces large, green-to-pale-brown, curving pipe-shaped flowers, with purple veins and a yellow-to-red lining. The U-shaped flowers produce winged capsular green fruits.

=== Pollination ===
The California pipevine's flowers have a musty unpleasant odor which is attractive to tiny carrion-feeding insects. The insects crawl into the convoluted flowers and often become stuck and disoriented for some time, picking up pollen as they wander. Most eventually escape. The plant is not insectivorous, as was formerly thought. Fungus gnats (Mycetophilidae) may prove to be the effective pollinators. G.L. Stebbins suggested that pollination by deceit is presumed.

== Chemistry ==
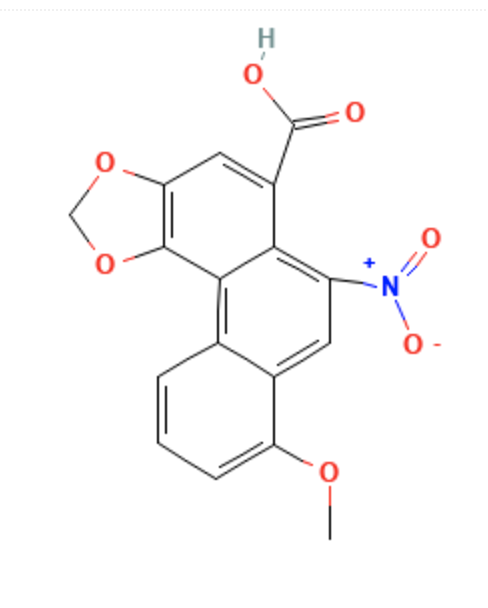
This example of an aristolochic acid is a monocarboxylic acid that is a phenanthrene-1-carboxylic acid, with a methylenedioxy- group at the 3rd and 4th positions, a methoxy- group at the 8th position, and a nitro group at the 10th position.

Like the other members of the family Aristolochiaceae, A. californica is highly toxic, producing a group of secondary metabolites known as aristolochic acids. Aristolochic acids are compounds that are composed of nitrophenanthrene carboxylic acids that have been utilized for medicinal purposes, being used in Chinese herbal medicines and usually included as a part of some weight-loss regimens. However, due to several warnings of the toxic effects of aristolochic acids by the US Food and Drug Administration and regulatory authorities of other countries, the sale and usage of aristolochic acids in medicine has been banned in multiple countries. The reasoning for this is that aristolochic acids act as a carcinogen and a nephrotoxin, inducing urothelial cancers and kidney failure. It has also been found that it may even act as a mutagen.

== California pipevine swallowtail butterfly ==
The larva of the endemic California pipevine swallowtail butterfly (Battus philenor hirsuta) relies on the California pipevine as its only food source. The red-spotted black caterpillars consume the leaves of the plants, and then take up the plant’s toxins, making them unpalatable to predators.

Due to their unpalatability from the sequestered aristolochic acids from Aristolochiaceae spp., there are several known species of butterflies that use Battus philenor, as an overall species, as a model for Batesian mimicry, including Papilio troilus L., the darker female morph of Papilio glaucus L., and Papilio polyxenes. However, there are no known species that mimic Battus philenor hirsuta specifically in the Northern California region.

The female butterflies tend to lay their eggs as clutches on an individual plant, preferring to lay only one clutch per shoot to ensure that the induced defenses of A. californica do not negatively affect a second clutch of offspring and so that they do not compete with one another. Having one clutch that feeds on the same shoot at the same time allows for a larger number of larvae to feed on the plant while the defenses are lower. It has been found that these clutches of caterpillars take part in aggregative feeding as to manipulate the type and/or size of the plant's induced defense in response to herbivory.

== See also ==
- Flora of the California chaparral and woodlands
- List of California native plants
- Pipevine swallowtail butterflies — nectar sources
