= Frank Skinner (disambiguation) =

Frank Skinner (born 1957) is a British comedian.

Frank Skinner may also refer to:

- Frank Skinner (composer) (1897–1968), American composer for motion pictures
- Frank J. Skinner (1891–1935), National Football League player
- Frank Leith Skinner (1882–1967), Canadian plant breeder
- Frank W. Skinner (1852–1932), American civil engineer, editor of the Engineering Record
- Eddie Skinner (Frank E. Skinner, 1908–1987), American stock car driver
