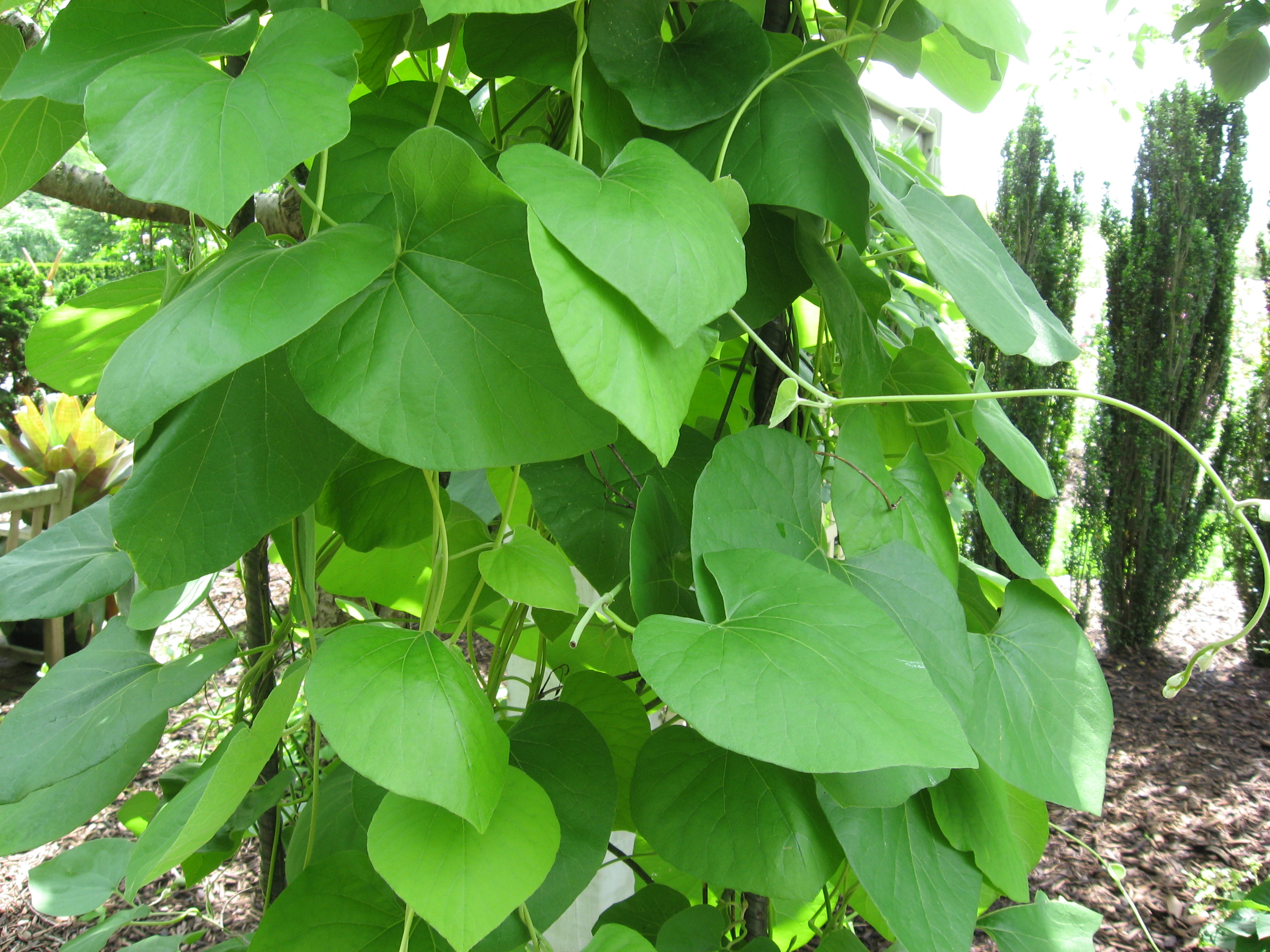

Scientific classification
- Kingdom: Plantae
- Clade: Tracheophytes
- Clade: Angiosperms
- Clade: Magnoliids
- Order: Piperales
- Family: Aristolochiaceae
- Genus: Aristolochia
- Species: A. tomentosa

Binomial name
- Aristolochia tomentosa Sims

Synonyms
- Isotrema tomentosum (Sims) H.Huber

= Aristolochia tomentosa =

Species of vine

Aristolochia tomentosa is a species of flowering plant in the family Aristolochiaceae.

Its native range includes the southeastern and South Central United States. The common name for the plant is woolly Dutchman's-pipe because the flower superficially resembles a Dutch smoking pipe.
