= Charles Skinner (geologist) =

Geologist

Charles Skinner is a geologist who was Head of Group Exploration at diamond miners De Beers. He co-authored "The Sculptures of Sydney Kumalo and Ezrom Legae" with Gavin Watkins.
