= Clarence Skinner =

Clarence Skinner may refer to:

- Jerry Skinner (Clarence Farrington Skinner, 1900–1962), New Zealand politician
- Clarence Skinner (cricketer) (1900–1969), a Barbadian cricketer
- Clarence Skinner (minister) (1881–1949), Universalist minister and dean of Crane School of Theology
