= Will Skinner =

Will Skinner may refer to:

- Will Skinner (American football) (1874–1953), American football coach
- Will Skinner (rugby union) (born 1984), rugby player

== See also ==
- William Skinner (disambiguation)
