= Henry Skinner (cricketer) =

Barbadian cricketer

Personal information
- Born: 8 September 1921; Saint Peter, Barbados
- Batting: Right-handed
- Bowling: Leg break
- Source: Cricinfo, 17 November 2020

Henry Skinner (born 8 September 1921, date of death unknown) was a Barbadian cricketer. He played in two first-class matches for the Barbados cricket team in 1941/42 and 1944/45.
