= Craig Skinner =

Craig Skinner may refer to:

- Craig Skinner (engineer), British Formula One engineer
- Craig Skinner (footballer) (born 1970), English footballer
- Craig Skinner (volleyball) (born 1969), American volleyball coach
