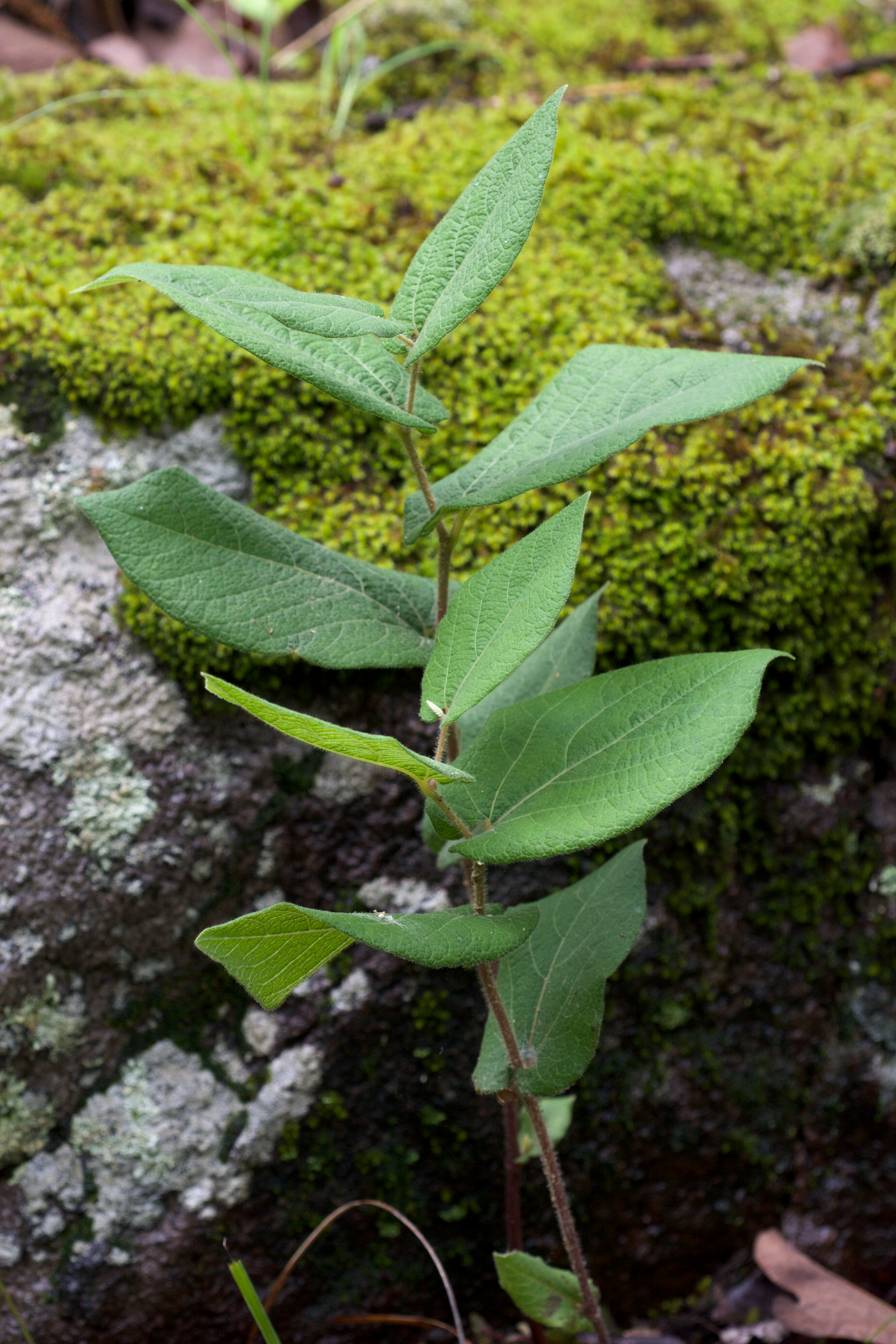

Conservation status
- Apparently Secure (NatureServe)

Scientific classification
- Kingdom: Plantae
- Clade: Tracheophytes
- Clade: Angiosperms
- Clade: Magnoliids
- Order: Piperales
- Family: Aristolochiaceae
- Genus: Aristolochia
- Species: A. reticulata

Binomial name
- Aristolochia reticulata Nutt.

= Aristolochia reticulata =

Species of vine

Aristolochia reticulata, the Red River snakeroot, Texas Dutchman's pipe, or Texas pipevine, is a species of perennial herb in the family Aristolochiaceae, and endemic to Arkansas, Louisiana, Oklahoma, and Texas. Its habit is erect to sprawling, up to 0.4 meters in height. It flowers in summer and late spring, and summer and grows in moist, sandy soils.

== Synonyms ==
- Siphisia reticulata (Nutt.) Klotzsch
