= Jimmy Skinner (footballer) =

English footballer

Personal information
- Full name: James Frederick Skinner
- Date of birth: 11 October 1898
- Place of birth: Beckenham, England
- Date of death: 1984
- Height: 5 ft 8 in (1.73 m)
- Position: Wing half

Senior career*
Years	Team	Apps	(Gls)
- Beckenham Town
1919–1925	Tottenham Hotspur	89	(3)
- * Club domestic league appearances and goals

James Frederick Skinner (11 October 1898 – September 1984) was an English professional footballer who played for Beckenham and Tottenham Hotspur.

== Early life ==
Skinner was born in Beckenham. He attended Manor Road school in West Ham and went to play for West Ham schools and represented the London schools side of 1912–13. In 1913 the schoolboy star was chosen to play for England schoolboys.

== Football career ==
Skinner began his career at Beckenham before joining Tottenham Hotspur in 1919 the wing half made his debut against Clapton Orient on 11 October 1919 his 21st birthday. In a career that was cut short by injury he made a total of 95 appearances and scored on three occasions in all competitions for the Spurs.

== Post-football career ==
Skinner ran several businesses including a drapery shop in Ladbroke Grove, a grocers located in Enfield before running a building company in Harlow and later a fruit farm.

== Death ==
Skinner died in September, 1984 at Cranborne, Dorset.
