= Thomas Skinner (British Army officer, died 1843) =

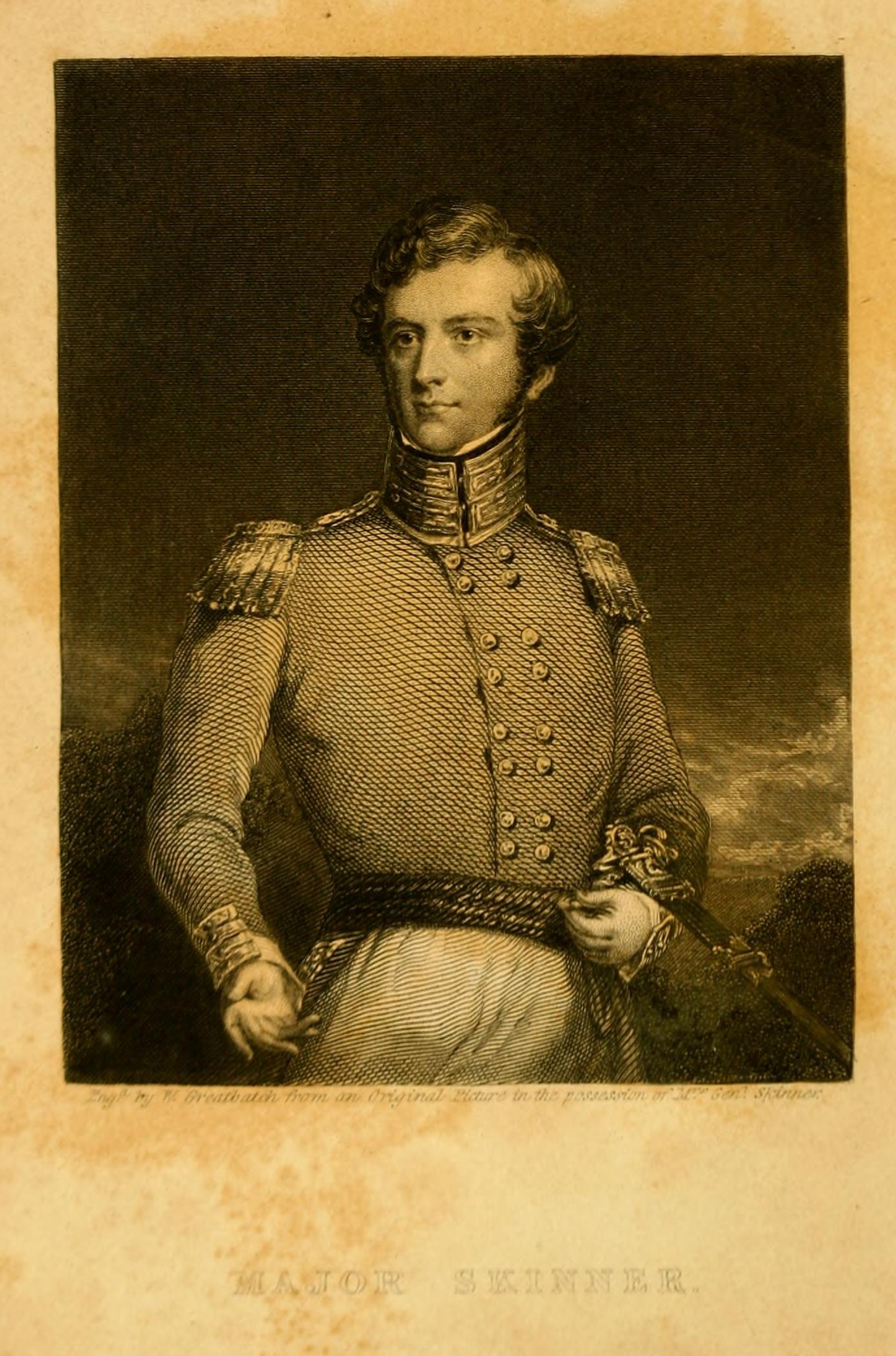

Thomas Skinner (1800? – 1843), was a British soldier and author. He commanded the 31st Foot in the First Anglo-Afghan War in 1842 and 1843. While there he was made a C.B. and brevet lieutenant-colonel. In 1832 he had published Excursions in India and four years later Adventures during a Journey Overland to India.

== Life ==
Born about 1800, he was son of Lieutenant-general John Skinner. He entered the army on 25 January 1816 as an ensign in the 16th Foot; he became lieutenant on 6 August 1819, captain on 9 October 1823, and exchanged into the 31st Foot on 25 March 1824.

Skinner went with his regiment to India shortly before 1826, on the voyage he was a witness to the Kent ship disaster.

He was stationed at Hardwar, in the North-West provinces, near the foot of the Himalayas. He made expeditions into little-known mountainous districts, and wrote up his explorations in Excursions in India (London, 1832). After returning home on leave, he went back to India in 1833 by the overland route through Egypt, Syria, and Palestine. He travelled down the Euphrates, and embarked on the Persian Gulf. He published an account of this journey in Adventures during a Journey Overland to India (London, 1836).

On 24 November 1835 Skinner attained the rank of major, and in 1842 he joined the force assembled at Jalalabad under Sir George Pollock for the relief of Kabul. He commanded the 31st Foot in the campaign, and on 26 July 1842 was present at the conflict of Mazeena, near Jalalabad. He accompanied Pollock's advance, and was given the task of clearing the hills on the left of the valley of Tezin in the engagement there on 13 September.

Skinner received for his services the Cross of the Order of the Bath and the Cabul medal, and was gazetted on 23 December to the brevet rank of lieutenant-colonel. He died at Landaur on 5 May 1843, in bad health from the campaign.

== Notes ==
Attribution

- This article incorporates text from a publication now in the public domain: Lee, Sidney, ed. (1897). "Skinner, Thomas (1800?-1843)". Dictionary of National Biography. Vol. 52. London: Smith, Elder & Co.
