= David Skinner (journalist) =

American journalist

David Paul Skinner (born February 25, 1973) is the editor of Humanities magazine, which is published by the National Endowment for the Humanities.

Before assuming the editorship of Humanities in 2007, Skinner was an assistant managing editor at The Weekly Standard, for which he frequently wrote. Prior to joining the Standard in November 1998, Skinner was managing editor of The Public Interest.

David Skinner has written for The Wall Street Journal, Slate, The Washington Times, The New Atlantis, Education Next, and other publications. He is on the usage panel for the American Heritage Dictionary. Until 2007, he edited Doublethink, a quarterly journal for young writers published by America's Future Foundation. He also was formerly associated with the Galley Slaves blog, along with fellow Weekly Standard staffers Jonathan V. Last and Victorino Matus.

Skinner's first book, The Story of Ain't: America, Its Language, and the Most Controversial Dictionary Ever Published (ISBN 978-0-06-202746-7), was published in 2012.

== Bibliography ==
=== Books ===
- Skinner, David (2012). The story of ain't : America, its language, and the most controversial dictionary ever published. New York: HarperCollins.

=== Critical studies and reviews ===
- Chiasson, Dan (November 2012). "The humble vernacular : a word-of-mouth dictionary". Reviews. Harper's Magazine. 325 (1950): 90–94. Review of The story of ain't.
