= Stephen Skinner =

Stephen or Steven Skinner may refer to:

- Stephen Skinner (lexicographer) (1623–1667), English physician, lexicographer and etymologist
- Stephen Skinner (Canadian politician) (1725–1808), provincial legislator in Nova Scotia
- Stephen Skinner (American politician), state legislator in West Virginia
- Stephen Skinner (author) (born 1948), Australian author of books on magic, feng shui and sacred geometry
- Steve Skinner (Stephen Karl Skinner, born 1981), English footballer
- Steven K. Skinner, CEO of KemperSports
