= Thomas Skinner (historical writer) =

Thomas Skinner (1629? – 1679) was a Colchester physician and historical writer.

== Biography ==
Skinner was probably the son of Nicholas Skinner, who was educated at Bishops Stortford and was admitted sizar of St. John's College, Cambridge, on 29 May 1646, at the age of sixteen. He proceeded doctor of medicine from St. John's College, Oxford, on 17 July 1672, and is described as sometime of Cambridge University. Skinner practised at Colchester, and is stated to have been "physician to [George Monck] Duke of Albemarle, when residing at New Hall in Essex", He was buried at St. Mary's, Colchester, on 8 August 1679.

== Bibliography ==
Skinner was the author of:

1. Elenchi Motuum Nuperorum in Anglia pars tertia, sive Motus Compositi, 8vo, 1676. This was a continuation of Bates's Elenchus; an English translation of all three parts was published in 1685.
2. The Life of General Monk, Duke of Albemarle, 8vo; this was published in 1723 by William Webster, curate of St. Dunstan's-in-the-West, with a preface vindicating Monck's character, and attributing the manuscript to Skinner. A letter from Skinner to the secretary of state in January 1677 states that he was solicited by the Christopher, 2nd Duke of Albemarle to write a life of his father in Latin, but only this English version of the life has survived. Skinner applied to Dr. Samuel Barrow and others for assistance in his task, and claims to have had access to a collection of Monck's papers, but C. H. Firth states the book is of little value, and contains no information respecting Monck's career of any special value.
