= Henry Skinner (judge) =

Sir Henry Skinner

Justice of the High Court
- In office 1982 – 15 March 1986

Sir Henry Albert Skinner (20 May 1926 – 15 March 1986) was a British barrister and High Court judge who sat in the Queen's Bench Division from 1980 until his death in 1986.

He was appointed a QC in 1965. In 1966, he was appointed Recorder of Leicester.

In 1982, Skinner pleaded guilty to a charge of driving without due care and attention after killing another driver. He was fined £300.
