= Edward Skinner (cricketer) =

English cricketer

Edward Alfred Skinner (18 January 1847 – 10 February 1919) was an English first-class cricketer active 1871–81 who played for Surrey. He was born in Mitcham and died in Brighton.
