= Michael Skinner (biologist) =

American geneticist

Michael Kirtland Skinner
- Born: May 12, 1956 (age 69); Redmond, Oregon
- Known for: work on epigenetics and epigenetic transgenerational inheritance
- Spouse: Roberta Anne McMaster (married 1975 in Pendleton, Oregon)

Michael Kirtland Skinner (born 1956) is a U.S. biologist specializing in reproductive biology and epigenetics.

Skinner was born in Redmond, Oregon to Hugh Kirtland Skinner and Tonya Valorie Skinner née Wolf.

He obtained A.S. at Warner Pacific College in Portland in 1977, B.A. in chemistry at Reed College, Portland, in 1979, Ph.D. in biochemistry at Washington State University in 1982, and post-doc at the University of Toronto until 1984. He is the Editor-in-Chief of the journal Environmental Epigenetic published by Oxford University Press.

In 1975, Skinner married Roberta Anne McMaster. They have two children.

Dr. Michael Skinner is a professor in the School of Biological Sciences at Washington State University. He did his B.S. in chemistry at Reed College in Portland Oregon, his Ph.D. in biochemistry / chemistry at Washington State University, and his Postdoctoral Fellowship at the C.H. Best Institute at the University of Toronto. He has been on the faculty of Vanderbilt University and the University of California at San Francisco. He is the Founding Director of the Center for Reproductive Biology at WSU and UI. Dr. Skinner is an expert in testis and ovary biology and cell-cell interactions, and his current research has demonstrated the ability of environmental toxicants to promote the epigenetic transgenerational inheritance of disease phenotypes due to abnormal germ line epigenetic programming in gonadal development. This non-genetic form of inheritance is how the environment can impact biology, evolution and disease etiology. He has identified epigenetic biomarkers for a number of human diseases including male infertility, paternal transmission of autism, arthritis, and preterm birth. Dr. Skinner has over 350 peer reviewed publications and has given over 350 invited symposia, plenary lectures and university seminars. He has done Ted talks and had documentaries done on his research with BBC Horizon, PBS Nova, Smithsonian, and France ARTE. He has founded several biotechnology companies.

== Awards ==
Skinner was the 2013 recipient of Smithsonian magazine's American Ingenuity Award in the Natural Science category.
