= Henry Skinner (entomologist) =

American entomologist (1861–1926)

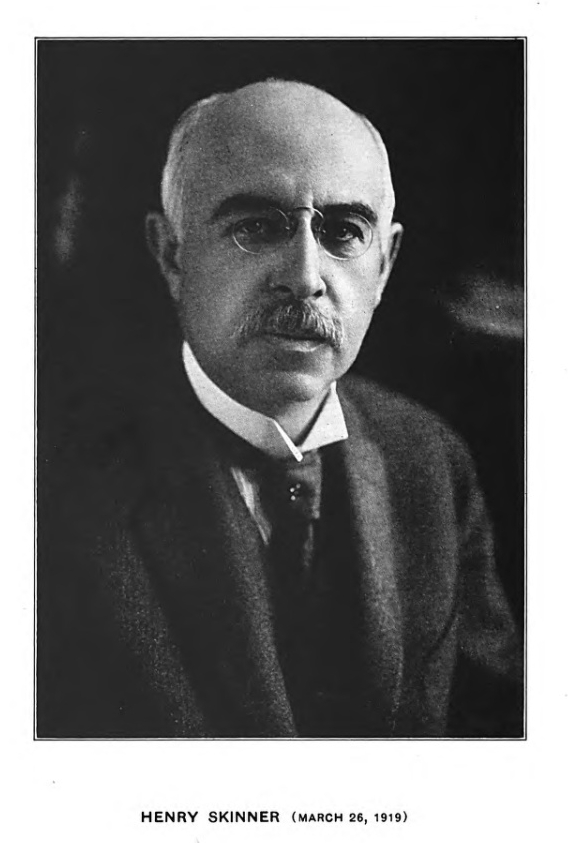
Skinner in 1919

Henry Skinner (March 27, 1861 – May 29, 1926) was an American gynecologist and entomologist. He served as an editor for Entomological News and as a curator of the entomological collections of the Academy of Natural Sciences, Philadelphia. He specialized on the lepidoptera of North America.

== Life and work ==
Skinner was born in Philadelphia to William and Sarah Irvin Skinner. He went to public schools and then Rugby Academy, 1879. He studied science (BS, 1881) and medicine (MD, 1884) at the University of Pennsylvania. After receiving his medical degree, he practiced in Philadelphia until 1900, working along with William Goodell in gynecology. He retired from medical practice in 1900 and then became more involved in entomology and worked as the Pennsylvania State Entomologist and as a professor at the horticultural society. He was especially interested in the lepidoptera and collected widely in the region as well as to places in North Carolina, New York, Missouri, Colorado and Utah. In 1913 he was a member of the International Commission of Zoological Nomenclature. He was an editor of the newsletter "Entomological News" where he suggested that the wide range of readers should be provided with articles ranging from taxonomy for the professionals to more readable material for amateurs. he edited the periodical from 1890 until 1910. He was known for his humour and once wrote about “...a new word, ‘Sloppydoptera,’ which has reference to specimens captured with a baseball bat or temporarily loaned to the new baby as playthings before being ‘sent out’.” He was a member of the American Entomological Society from 1883, serving as a secretary from 1898 to 1915 and as president from 1916 to 1925. He was elected to the Academy of Natural Sciences of Philadelphia in 1881. He gave public lectures at the Ludwick Institute. He received an honorary doctorate in 1911 from the University of Pittsburgh.

Skinner described several new lepidoptera subspecies and described a few species. His types are held in Philadelphia. He also worked on the systematics of the North American Hesperiidae, including those of Cuba. Harrison Dyar was critical of Skinner for not taking into account larval characteristics in his taxonomic works.

Skinner married Celia Angela Beck in 1886 and they had a daughter and a son. He lived in Philadelphia and in 1907, they moved to Ardmore and later to a farm near Schuylkill falls.
