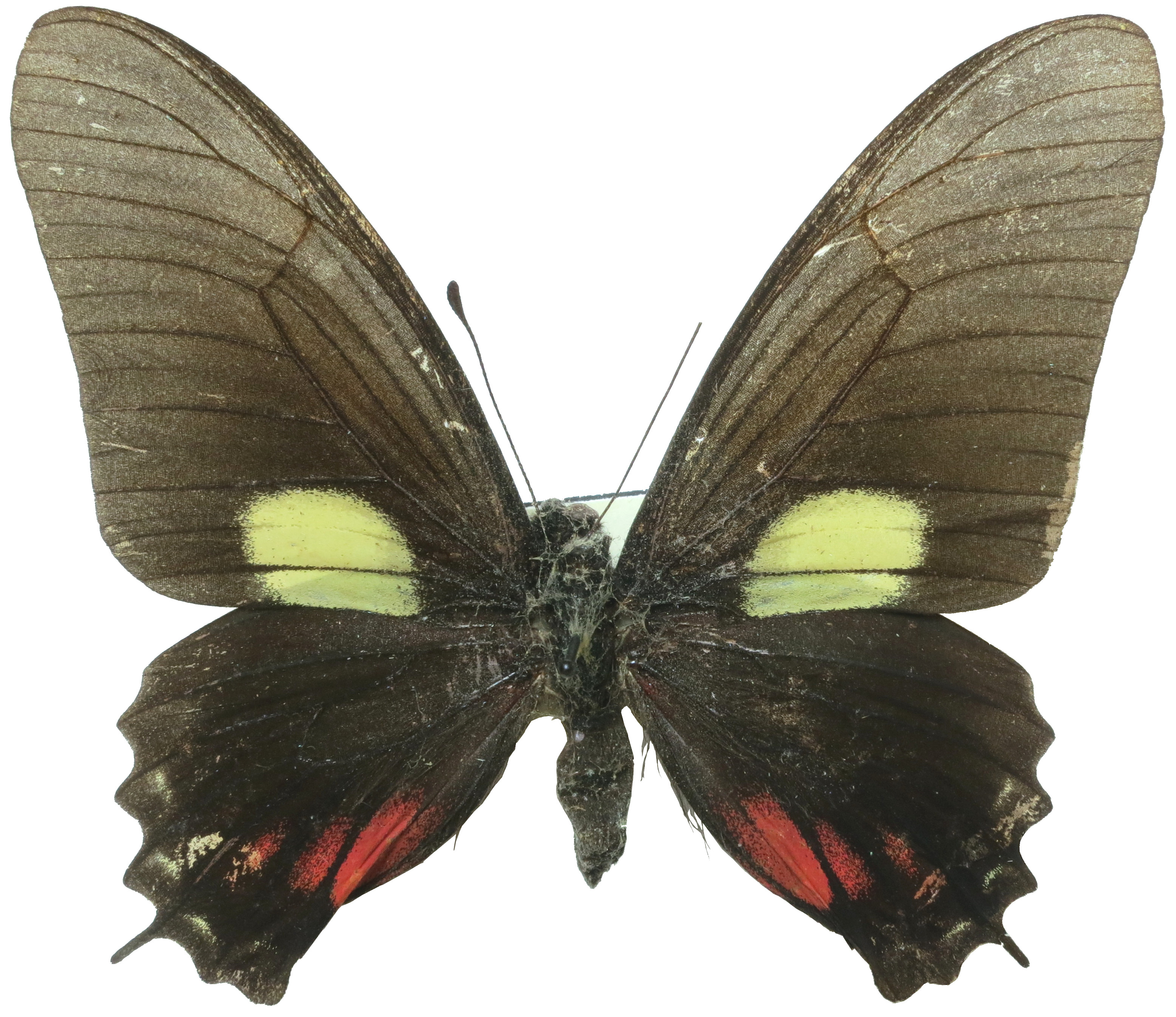
- M. x. xynias - Chapare, Bolivia

Scientific classification
- Kingdom: Animalia
- Phylum: Arthropoda
- Clade: Pancrustacea
- Class: Insecta
- Order: Lepidoptera
- Family: Papilionidae
- Genus: Mimoides
- Species: M. xynias

Binomial name
- Mimoides xynias (Hewitson, 1875)

Synonyms
- Papilio xynias Hewitson, 1875; Eurytides xynias; Papilio trapeza f. trapezoides Niepelt, 1913; Papilio trapeza Rothschild & Jordan, 1906; Papilio harmodius xeniades ♀-f. androna Rothschild & Jordan, 1906; Papilio xynias xisuthrus Niepelt, 1908; Papilio trapeza concoloratus Joicey & Talbot, 1922

= Mimoides xynias =

Species of butterfly

Mimoides xynias is a species of butterfly in the family Papilionidae. It is found in the Neotropical realm.

== Subspecies ==
- M. x. xynias Peru, Bolivia
- M. x. trapeza (Rothschild & Jordan, 1906) Ecuador

== Description from Seitz ==
P. xynias Hew. (13 c). Forewing with large pale green area at the hindmargin; hindwing acutely dentate, with short, narrow tail and a few red discal spots posteriorly. Beneath the forewing has a white, very faintly- green hindmarginal spot, which is smaller than the spot on the upper surface. No scent-scales. Female not known. — Eastern slopes of the Andes of Bolivia and Peru. P. trapeza R. & J. (13 c). Forewing narrower in the middle than in harmodius, the hindmargin shorter, a white spot at the hindmargin, not extending to the 2. median; hindwing triangular, sharply dentate, with 2 to 4- red spots from the hindmargin forwards, the posterior spot the largest. Beneath the white hindmarginal spot of the forewing is longer than in all the forms of harmodius. Female unknown. — East Ecuador and North-East Peru

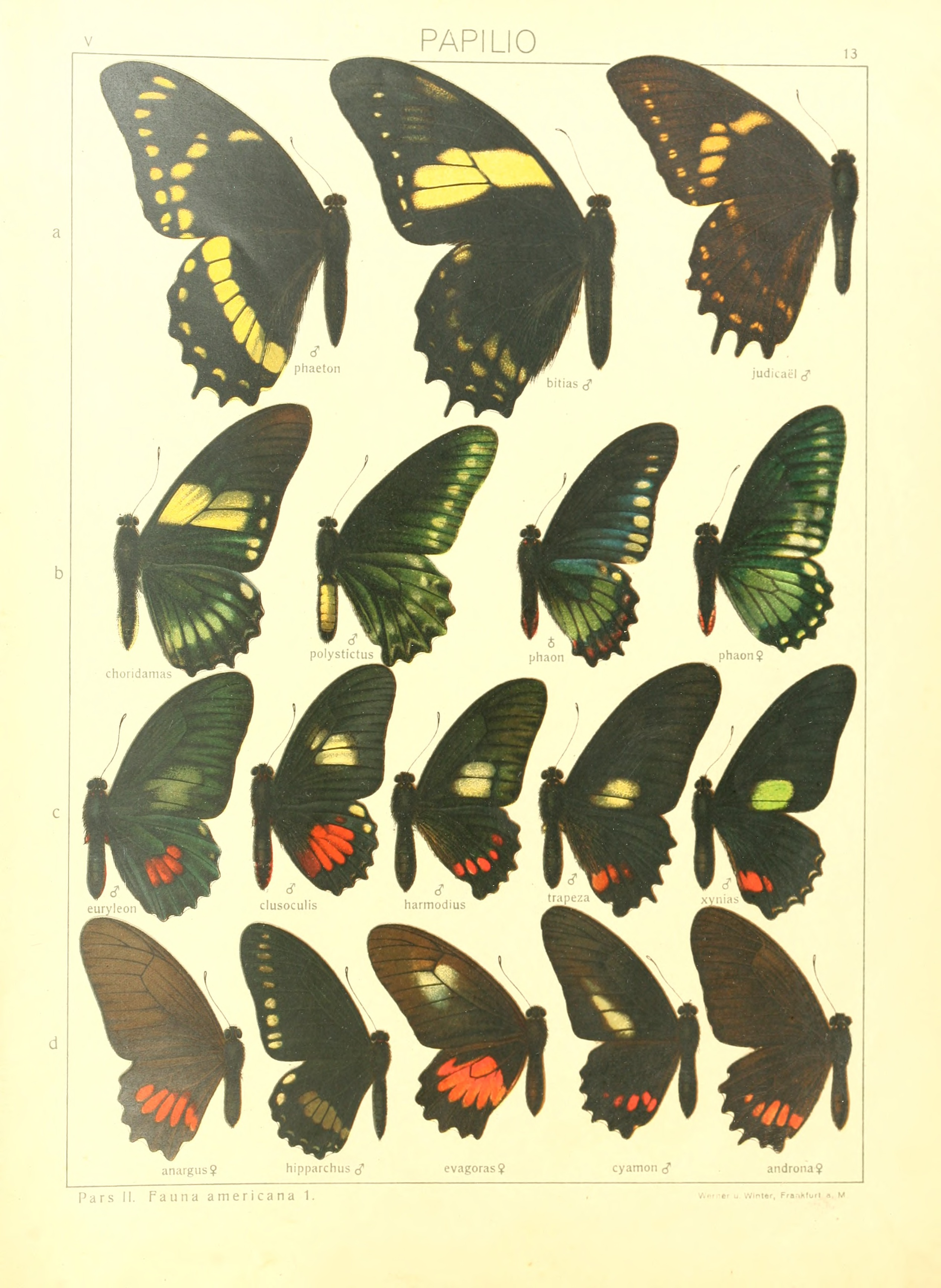
Seitz Plate 13

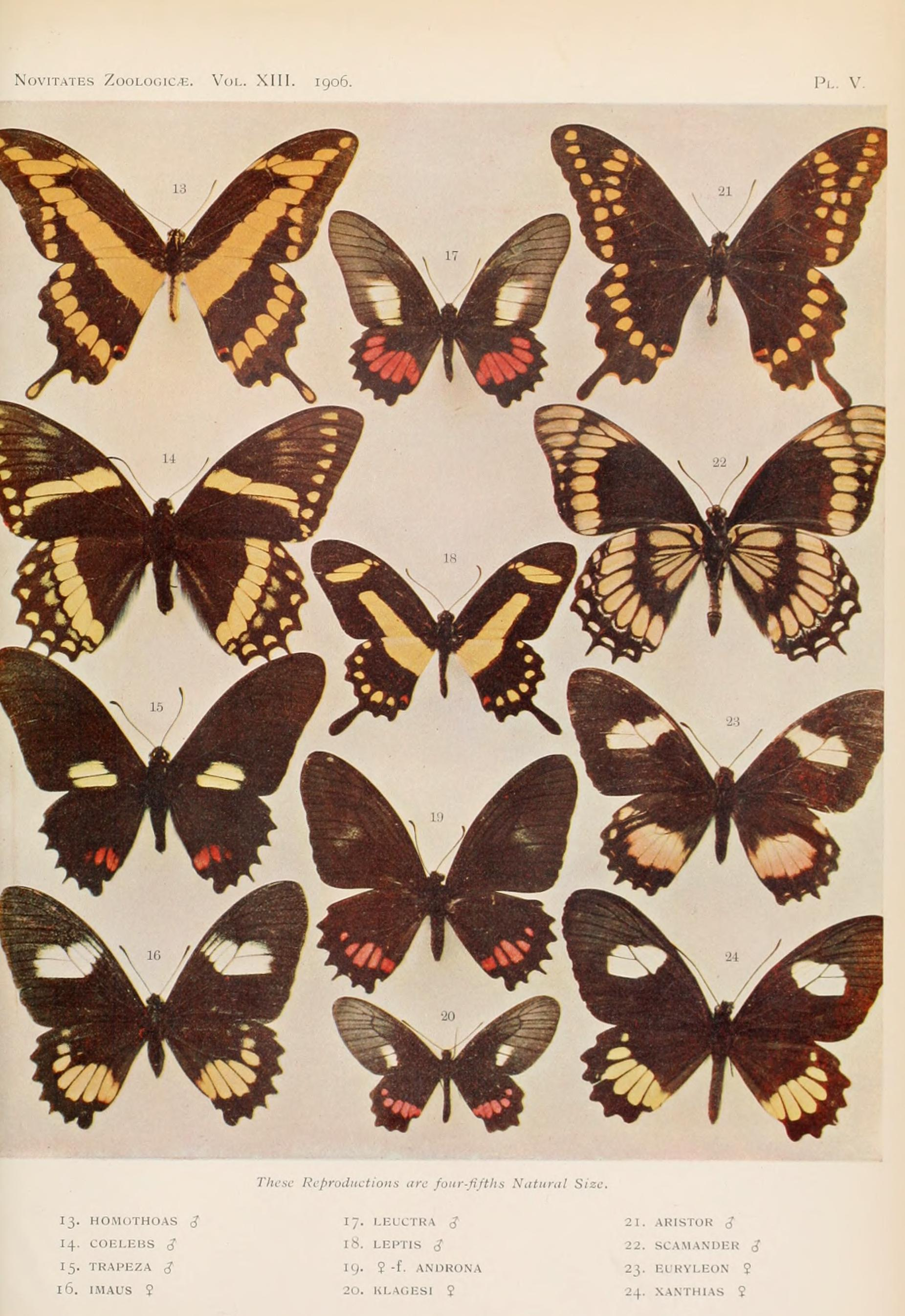
Novitates Zoologicae 1906 Plate 5
