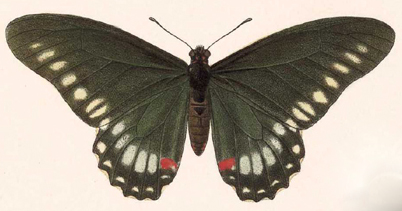
- Green form

Scientific classification
- Kingdom: Animalia
- Phylum: Arthropoda
- Clade: Pancrustacea
- Class: Insecta
- Order: Lepidoptera
- Family: Papilionidae
- Genus: Mimoides
- Species: M. phaon

Binomial name
- Mimoides phaon (Boisduval, 1836)

Synonyms
- Papilio phaon Boisduval, 1836; Papilio ulopos Gray, [1853]; Papilio xenarchus Hewitson, [1853]; Papilio eridamas Reakirt, 1866; Papilio metaphaon Butler, 1874; Papilio pharax Godman & Salvin, [1890]; Papilio hipparchus Staudinger, 1884; Papilio pharnabazus Ehrmann, 1920; Papilio pyrholochus Ehrmann, 1920; Papilio phaon f. nero Röber, 1931 (preocc. Fabricius, 1793); Eurytides hipparchus

= Mimoides phaon =

Red-sided swallowtail

Species of butterfly

Mimoides phaon, the red-sided swallowtail or variable swallowtail, is a species of butterfly in the family Papilionidae. It is native to the Americas.

== Description ==
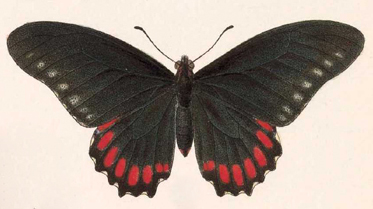
Red form

The dorsal side of the red-sided swallowtail's wings is variable. They are mainly black with the hindwings having a postmedian band of spots, which are either greenish blue or red. Some individuals have one or two rows of smaller light colored spots along the outer margin of the hindwing. The forewing has a row of whitish spots along the outer margin, which may be reduced or lacking in some individuals. The underside of the wings is less variable than the upperside. The outer margin of the hindwing has a row of small red crescents. The basal area of the hindwing, the thorax, and the head are spotted with red. The abdomen has a row of lateral red spots, which distinguish M. phaon from other members of its genus.

== Description from Seitz ==
P. phaon Boisd. Similar to the preceding species [Mimoides protodamas]; the spots on thorax and abdomen red, the posterior abdominal segments with red lateral spots. Very variable. Spots on the upper surface of the forewing bluish yellow-grey or purer white -yellow; discal band of the hindwing grey-blue, rarely red. Under surface without distinct cell-streaks, forewing without basal spots, hindwing with 3. Scent-scales present in the male. Mexico to West Ecuador and Venezuela. The following forms have been described as species: ab. loc. xenarchus Hew., hindwing with broad red band; ab. loc. eridamas Reak., the red band of the hindwing narrow, the spots composing it separated; these two forms only known from East and South Mexico; ab. phaon Boisd. (I3b), forewing with submarginal spots, but without discal spots, the band of the hindwing just entering the apex of the cell; ab. ulopos Gray (= immarginatus Oberth), forewing without spots or with only indications of them, band of the hindwing broad, entering more or less far into the cell; ab. therodamas Feldr., with discal and submarginal spots on the forewing and narrow, slanting band on the hindwing, separated from the cell; ab. metaphaon Butl. has on the hindwing a very large blue-green discal area, occupying a good part of the cell; in ab. pharax Godm. & Salv. the hindwing has a red anal spot and the discal band is remote from the cell. All these forms are connected with one another by transitions.

== Subspecies ==
- Mimoides phaon phaon (Boisduval, 1836)
- Mimoides phaon therodamas (C. Felder & R. Felder, 1865)

== Distribution ==
The nominate subspecies, M. p. phaon, is found in northeastern Mexico, Belize, and Honduras. The other subspecies, M. p. therodamas, is found in Colombia, Venezuela, and eastern Ecuador. In October, 2008, M. p. phaon was found in the Lower Rio Grande Valley in southern Texas, making it the first swallowtail of the genus Mimoides to stray into the United States.

== Life cycle ==
The red-sided swallowtail caterpillar is mainly black with its head and thorax spotted with blue and yellow. The abdomen is striped laterally with blue, yellow, black, and white. The last segments are spotted like the head.

== Host plants ==
The red-sided swallowtail feeds on Annona species as a caterpillar.
