= Poço das Antas Biological Reserve =

Protected area in Brazil

- Reserva Biológica de Poço das Antas
- IUCN category Ia (strict nature reserve)
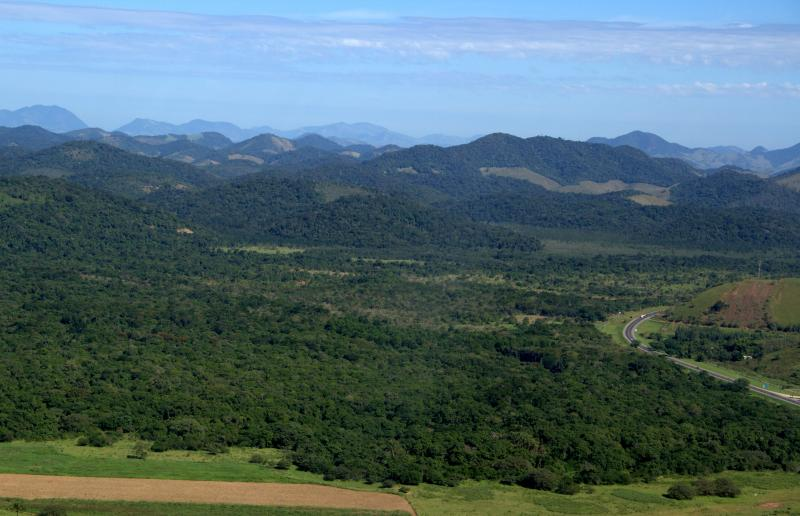
- Aerial view of Poço das Antas Biological Reserve

- Location within Brazil
- Location: Rio de Janeiro State, Brazil
- Coordinates: 22°33′11″S 42°16′55″W
- Area: 50 km^{2} (19 sq mi)
- Designation: Biological Reserve
- Established: 1974

Poço das Antas Biological Reserve (Portuguese: Reserva Biológica Poço das Antas) is a biological reserve located in Rio de Janeiro State, Brazil.

The reserve, which covers 5,052 hectares (12,480 acres) in the Atlantic Forest biome, was created on 11 March 1974. It is administered by the Chico Mendes Institute for Biodiversity Conservation.

The reserve is in the municipality of Silva Jardim, Rio de Janeiro. The terrain is relatively flat, with elevations from 14 to 205 metres (46 to 673 ft). Average annual rainfall is 2,400 millimetres (94 in). Temperatures range from 18 to 35 °C (64 to 95 °F) with an average of 23 °C (73 °F). The São João River defines the boundary of the reserve, which is laced with small springs, channels and streams.

== Environment ==
The vegetation includes dense lowland rainforest, some flooded and some not. Some areas have suffered deforestation. Over 365 plant species have been recorded, of which 12 are on the IUCN list of endangered species.

The reserve is home to 77 known species of mammals. Currently, the mammal population is threatened due to many reasons such as wildfires and poaching. The reserve is famous for its golden lion tamarins (Leontopithecus rosalia), which represent most part of the few remaining wild golden lion tamarins in the world. There is estimated to be 1000 tamarins in the reserve and surrounding areas. Currently the Golden Lion Tamarin Conservation Project (GLTCP) is attempting to save the golden lion tamarins from extinction.

Migratory bird species include swallow-tailed kite (Elanoides forficatus), plumbeous kite (Ictinia plumbea), blue ground dove (Claravis pretiosa), dark-billed cuckoo (Coccyzus melacoryphus), white-collared swift (Streptoprocne zonaris), Sick's swift (Chaetura meridionalis), black jacobin (Florisuga fusca), black-throated mango (Anthracothorax nigricollis), white-rumped monjita (Xolmis velatus), yellow-browed tyrant (Satrapa icterophrys), rusty-margined flycatcher (Myiozetetes cayanensis), streaked flycatcher (Myiodynastes maculatus), piratic flycatcher (Legatus leucophaius), fork-tailed flycatcher (Tyrannus savana), white-winged becard (Pachyramphus polychopterus), red-eyed vireo (Vireo olivaceus), lined seedeater (Sporophila lineola) and sooty grassquit (Tiaris fuliginosus).

== Conservation ==
The Biological Reserve is a "strict nature reserve" under IUCN protected area category Ia. The purpose is to fully preserve the biota and other natural attributes without direct human interference. As well as protecting the coastal forest ecosystem and remaining native fauna and preserving endangered indigenous species, the reserve has the function of creating laboratories to create and restock examples of flora and fauna.

Protected species include the white-necked hawk (Buteogallus lacernulatus), maned sloth (Bradypus torquatus), maned wolf (Chrysocyon brachyurus), purple-winged ground dove (Claravis geoffroyi), golden lion tamarin (Leontopithecus rosalia), the catfish Microcambeva barbata, the butterflies Mimoides lysithous and Parides ascanius, and Salvadori's antwren (Myrmotherula minor).

== Sources ==
- Brito, Daniel; Oliveira, Leonardo C.; Mello, Marco Aurélio R. (2004), "An overview of mammalian conservation at Poço das Antas Biological Reserve, southeastern Brazil", Journal for Nature Conservation, 12 (4): 219–228, doi:10.1016/j.jnc.2004.09.001
- Rebio de Poço das Antas (in Portuguese), Chico Mendes Institute for Biodiversity Conservation
- Unidade de Conservação: Reserva Biológica de Poço das Antas (in Portuguese), MMA: Ministério do Meio Ambiente
