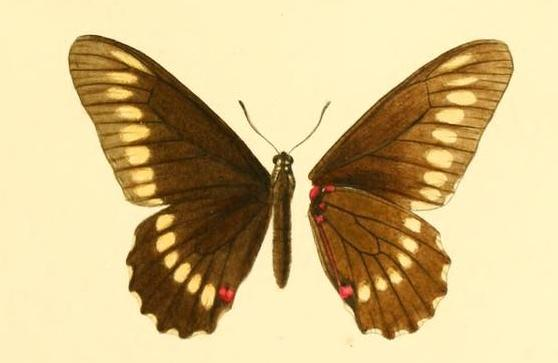

Scientific classification
- Kingdom: Animalia
- Phylum: Arthropoda
- Clade: Pancrustacea
- Class: Insecta
- Order: Lepidoptera
- Family: Papilionidae
- Genus: Mimoides
- Species: M. microdamas

Binomial name
- Mimoides microdamas (Burmeister, 1878)

Synonyms
- Papilio microdamas Burmeister, 1878

= Mimoides microdamas =

Species of butterfly

Mimoides microdamas is a Neotropical butterfly in the family Papilionidae. It is found in southern Brazil, Argentina and Paraguay.

== Description ==
A yellowish band from the costal margin of the forewing to the anal angle of the hindwing; under surface without red basal spots on the forewing, with four spots on the hindwing. Female similar to the male.

== Biology ==
A lowland species.
