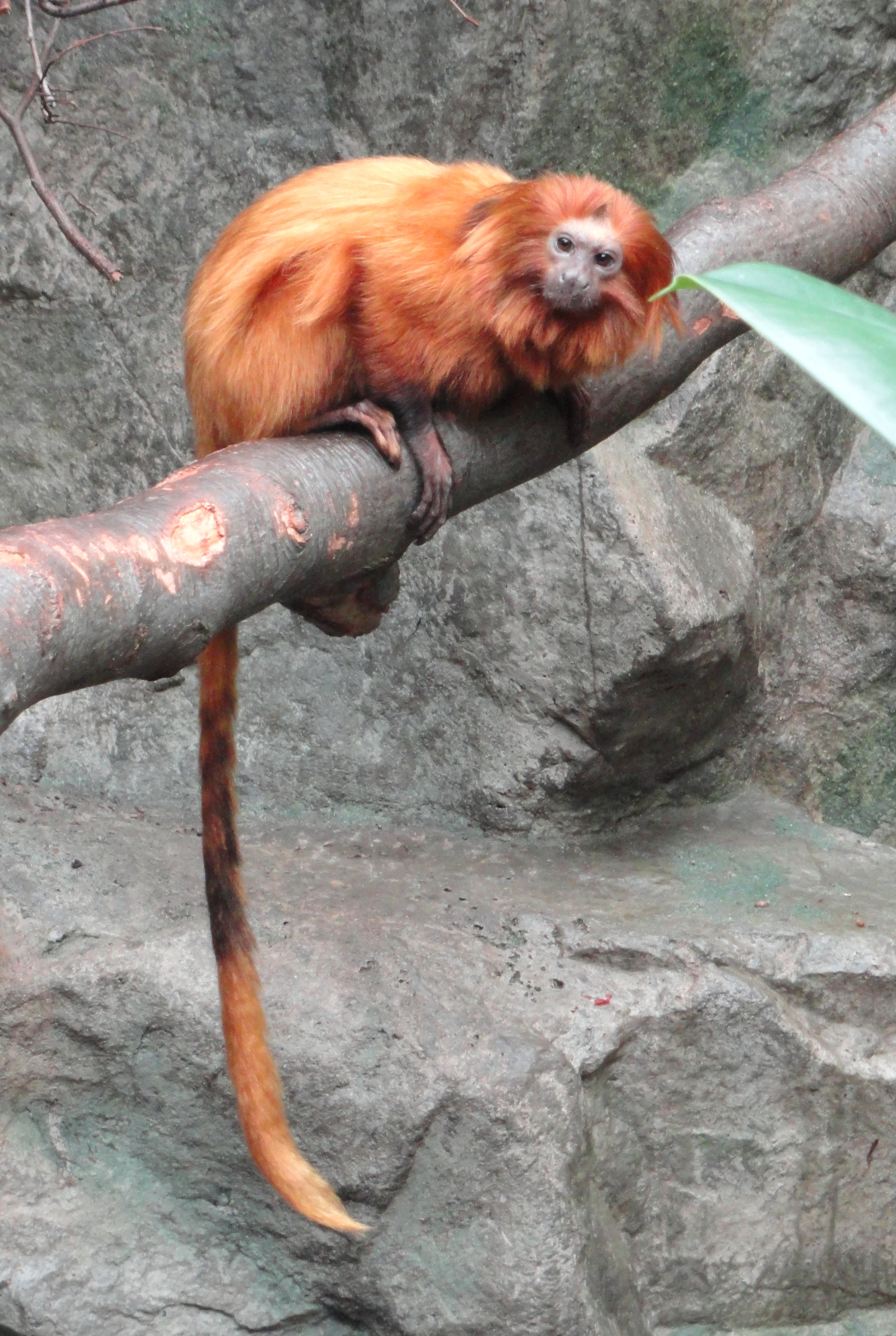
- Male at Copenhagen Zoo, Copenhagen, Denmark
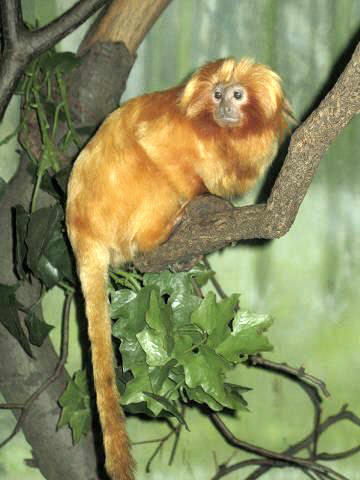
- Female at the Bronx Zoo, New York, United States

Conservation status
- Endangered (IUCN 3.1)
- CITES Appendix I

Scientific classification
- Kingdom: Animalia
- Phylum: Chordata
- Class: Mammalia
- Order: Primates
- Family: Callitrichidae
- Genus: Leontopithecus
- Species: L. rosalia

Binomial name
- Leontopithecus rosalia (Linnaeus, 1766)

Synonyms
- Jacchus rosalia brasiliensis Fischer, 1829; Jacchus rosalia guyannensis Fischer, 1829; Leontocebus leoninus Pocock, 1914; Leontopithecus aurora Elliot, 1913; Leontopithecus marikina Lesson, 1840; Simia rosalia Linnaeus, 1766

= Golden lion tamarin =

Species of New World monkey

The golden lion tamarin (Leontopithecus rosalia; Portuguese: mico-leão-dourado [ˈmiku leˈɐ̃w do(w)ˈɾadu, - liˈɐ̃w -]), less commonly known as the golden lion marmoset, is a small New World monkey of the family Callitrichidae. Endemic to the Atlantic coastal forests of Brazil, the golden lion tamarin is an endangered species. Its geographic range is entirely within the state of Rio de Janeiro. A 2022/2023 census estimated about 4,800 individuals living in the current primary area of occurrence in the non-coastal area of the São João and Macaé river basins, with unknown but smaller additional numbers in limited coastal forests and to the west of the primary area of occurrence. There is a captive population maintaining about 490 individuals among 150 zoos.

== Physical characteristics ==
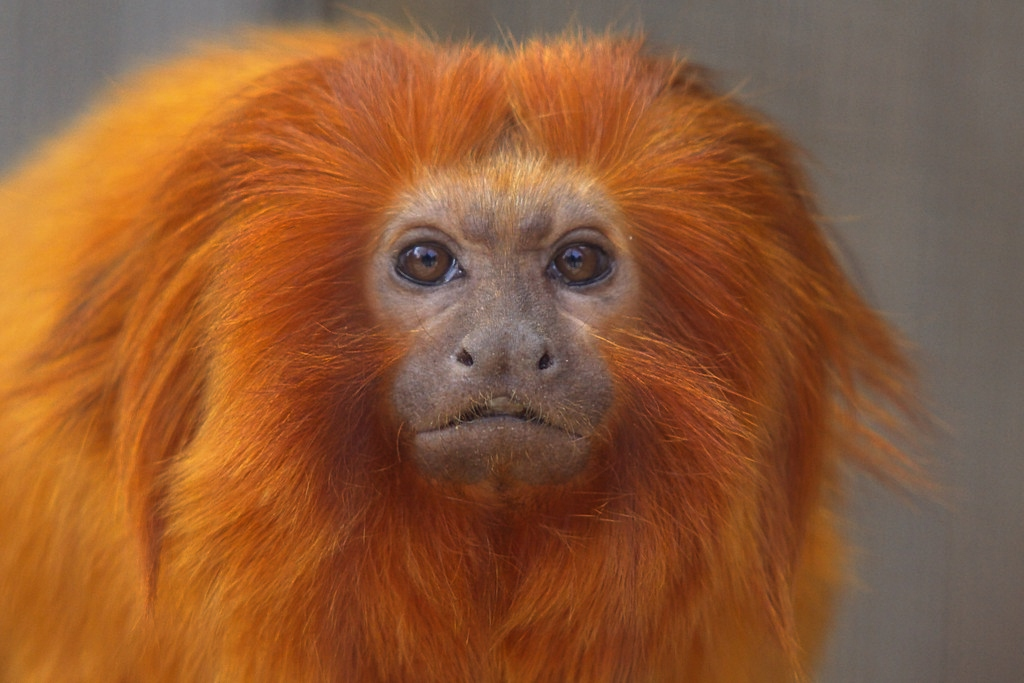
Closeup on the golden lion tamarin's face

The golden lion tamarin gets its name from its bright reddish-orange pelage and the extra-long hairs around the face and ears, which give it a distinctive mane. Its face is dark and hairless. The bright orange fur of this species does not contain carotenoids, which commonly produce bright orange colors in nature. The golden lion tamarin is the largest of the callitrichid monkeys. It is typically around 261 mm (10.3 in) and weighs around 620 g (1.37 lb). Almost no size difference exists between males and females. As with all callitrichids, the golden lion tamarin has claw-like nails, instead of the flat nails found in other monkeys and apes, although callitrichids do have a flat nail on the big toe.

Golden lion tamarins walk, run, and bound quadrupedally on top of branches, or, less frequently, they run and walk on the ground. When golden lion tamarins run or bound, their hindlimbs alternately overstride their forelimbs, and their feet are set atop the support and grasp it almost perpendicular to the line of travel, making the body's angle of travel oblique rather than precisely parallel to the substrate, a pattern known as "transaxial bounding". In addition, facilitated by their claw-like nails, golden lion tamarins cling and climb on vertical tree trunks (see photographs in Serra (2019), pp 108–117, 137, 155).

== Habitat and distribution ==
The golden lion tamarin has a limited current area of occupancy, as most of the original habitat in the Brazilian state of Rio de Janeiro has been lost to deforestation. Today, the species is confined to fragments of forest within the state, including Poço das Antas Biological Reserve, União Biological Reserve, other protected areas, and privately owned lands. Most of the area of occupancy is characterized by vegetation types classified as dense broadleaf evergreen or seasonal deciduous and semideciduous forest, with some tamarins living in areas closest to the coast found in a sandy soil forest type called "arboreal restinga". Golden lion tamarins are thought to occur primarily in low-elevation forests, up to 150 or 300 meters above sea level, but a 1990–1992 survey identified two groups above 500 meters, and reports from the recently identified western geographic area include records above 700 meters.

Golden lion tamarin population estimates in the 1960s and 1970s ranged from only 100 to 600, although these estimates were not based on range-wide censuses. The first such census, carried out 1990–1992, counted about 560 wild individuals and there were about 100 additional individuals from the reintroduction program living in the wild. Since then, following conservation efforts including reintroduction of zoo-born animals and translocation of wild individuals from small, at-risk forest fragments (both largely to areas then unoccupied by tamarins), reforestation with a particular focus on connecting separated areas of habitat, and community-based conservation and engagement programs, the population has grown significantly. Most recently, a 2022-23 census estimated about 4,800 golden lion tamarins living in the current primary area of occurrence in the noncoastal area of the São João and Macaé River basins, with unknown but smaller additional numbers in limited coastal forests and to the west of the primary area of occurrence.

== Behaviour and ecology ==
Leontopithecus rosalia in Singapore Zoo

=== Diet ===
In the wild, golden lion tamarins eat mostly fruits and small animal prey, in addition to smaller quantities of nectar and plant exudates (tree gum).

==== Plant material ====
Fruits, mostly ripe, are the plant part consumed by golden lion tamarins for more than 80% of plant species eaten. Tamarins swallow the seeds of most fruits they consume and are considered to function as effective seed dispersers for many plant species.

Wild golden lion tamarins eat from a wide variety of plant species, with 160 species noted in one multiple-group study. Despite this variety of food plants, they appear to get most of their plant food from a smaller subset of species. For example, just seven of the 160 plant species noted eaten by golden lion tamarins in the União Biological Reserve accounted for 56% of total plant feeding observations.

The most common reported source of nectar in golden lion tamarin diets are the flowers of the tree Symphonia globulifera. Nectar consumption typically represents a small proportion of the plant diet (6%-10% of observations or time), but some groups may concentrate heavily on nectar during the cool, dry season in at least some years.

Exudates or tree gum are soft, semiliquid substances produced by trees and lianas in response to damage to exterior bark or to disease. Golden lion tamarins in the Poço das Antas Reserve fed occasionally on tree gum that they found opportunistically on trees and woody lianas, and gum consumption represented less than 2% of total feeding observations or time. Lion tamarins (and other tamarins) lack the dentition and other specializations for gum-feeding characteristic of marmoset genera, e.g., Callithrix and Cebuella.

==== Animal prey ====
Animal prey reported as eaten by wild golden lion tamarins in at least one study include frogs and tree frogs, amphibian egg masses, lizards, snakes, nestling birds, bird eggs, snails, spiders, centipedes, katydids, grasshoppers, crickets, beetles and beetle larvae, cockroaches, ants, stick insects, butterflies, caterpillars, and insect-infested tree galls. Orthopteran insects (e.g., grasshoppers, katydids, and crickets) were the most commonly eaten prey in one study.

Golden lion tamarins capture most of their prey animals from hidden crevices in tree bark, rotten wood, holes in trees, vine tangles, within curled dead leaves, between the leaves and in the basins of bromeliads, inside hollow bamboo, under the sheaths of palm leaves, or in leaf litter on the ground and debris accumulated in limb junctions and palm apices. A golden lion tamarin captures such hidden prey by inserting its fingers, hand, and even forearm into the visually inaccessible recesses, groping blindly by sense of touch, grasping an encountered prey item, and withdrawing and eating it. This is a form of the foraging technique known as "extractive foraging on embedded foods", and in golden lion tamarins has been termed "micro-manipulation". Peres reported that such extractive foraging accounted for 98% of prey captures observed in one study in the Poço das Antas Biological Reserve. Lion tamarins (the genus Leontopithecus as a whole) have significantly longer and narrower hands (including longer fingers) than other callitrichids. This is considered to be an adaptation to their micro-manipulation foraging behavior.

=== Home range and use of space ===
Golden lion tamarin groups are highly territorial; they have areas of exclusive use, but engage in aggressive encounters with neighboring groups at borders and in areas of overlap. These encounters feature chases and characteristic vocalizations and posturing, and can include brief physical contact and fights. Peres proposed that these encounters served to reinforce boundaries and preserve areas of exclusive use, "preventing neighbors from trespassing farther" (p 232). The term "home range" is used here, representing the full area that a tamarin group uses, including both areas of exclusive use and areas of overlap with neighboring groups. For one study group in Poço das Antas Biological Reserve, about 60% of the study group's home range was overlapped by the home ranges of neighboring groups.

A long-term study in Poço das Antas Biological Reserve calculated a mean home range size of 50.5 ha (124.8 acres) for golden lion tamarin groups over one-year periods(pp 66–67), with a range of 17.4-87.7 ha (43.0-216.7 acres). Reports from União Biological Reserve indicate larger home range sizes there, which may be a result of lower population density in União at the time of the studies as well as differences in calculation methods. Golden lion tamarin home ranges are not static over time. One study found a mean of 77% home range overlap for a group between one year and the next. Wild golden lion tamarins use their home ranges unevenly, with some areas used much more heavily than others. In a study in Poço das Antas Biological Reserve, "core areas", where 50% of a group's location records were documented, averaged around 10% of a group's total home range.

Reports of average daily travel distances for individual groups range from 1,339 to 2,135 m (4,393 to 7,005 ft). Single-day travel distances for groups vary more widely. For example, in one study of two groups in União Biological Reserve, single-day travel distances ranged from 401 to 3,916 m (1,316 to 12,848 ft).

=== Sleeping sites ===
Golden lion tamarins usually spend more than half their time in overnight sleeping sites and thus they are active for less than half the day. Two groups in the União Biological Reserve spent an average of 14.2 hours and 13.1 hours in their sleeping sites (calculated from Table 1). Active periods are longer in the austral summer, which have more hours of daylight. In the Poço das Antas Biological Reserve, golden lion tamarins left their sleeping sites in the morning an average of 10 min after sunrise and entered at the end of the day an average of 82 min before sunset.

Multiple authors have reported that golden lion tamarins prefer to sleep in naturally occurring tree holes. Tree holes, also termed tree cavities or tree hollows, are reported as the predominant sleeping site for other lion tamarin species as well. In an extensive study of golden lion tamarins in the Poço das Antas Biological Reserve, tree holes were the most commonly used type of site (63.6% of "nights"), followed by (non-native) bamboo clusters at ground level (17.5%), vine tangles in trees (9.6%), and large bromeliads growing on trees (4.7%). Golden lion tamarin groups in the União Biological Reserve used tree holes exclusively or almost exclusively. This heavy use of tree holes is in contrast to other callitrichid genera, which have been reported to use tree holes, but typically not predominantly, or to not use tree holes at all.

Golden lion tamarin groups use multiple sleeping sites across time. Some groups in the Poço das Antas Biological Reserve used more than 40 sites across multiple years of study. Groups use a small subset of these sites frequently, suggesting that some sites are highly preferred over others. In the Poço das Antas Biological Reserve, golden lion tamarin groups used the same sleeping site on consecutive nights in roughly 50% of the cases when sites for consecutive nights were identified. Two groups in the União Biological Reserve used the same site on consecutive nights at somewhat lower rates, 20% and 38%.

Multiple authors have discussed the role of sleeping site selection in relation to (overnight) predation, proposing that tree holes may provide greater protection from predators than other sleeping site types (for example,)

=== Predators ===
Only a few published reports confirm the identities of successful predators on golden lion tamarins, with these cases including a boa constrictor (Boa constrictor) (p 158), a small cat identified as an ocelot (Felis pardalis), and a feral dog (Canis familiaris), the latter two incidents involving reintroduced zoo-born golden lion tamarins. However, circumstantial evidence suggests that additional species are golden lion tamarin predators as well: raptors; capuchin monkeys (Cebus/Sapajus nigritus); coatimundis (Nasua nasua); and tayra (Eira barbara).

Tayra were strongly suspected as the primary predator in a series of deaths and disappearances in Poço das Antas Biological Reserve. From 1995 to 2000, a sharp increase in predation was noted in the golden lion tamarin study population in the reserve, substantially reducing the estimated reserve population from 350 to 220 individuals during this period. At least during this period, most documented predation appeared to have occurred overnight, at or near sleeping sites. Several authors have discussed the role of sleeping site selection in relation to (overnight) predation, noting that tree holes, a den type frequently used by golden lion tamarins, may provide greater protection from predators than other sleeping site types, although most of the documented events at the Poço das Antas reserve occurred at such tree hole sleeping sites.

Wild golden lion tamarins approach and mob some arboreal and terrestrial predators, e.g., snakes and tayra, as well as perched raptors, but are reported to retreat quietly from capuchin monkeys(p 240). Golden lion tamarins also use alarm vocalizations in reaction to predators. Calls associated with terrestrial and arboreal predators are reported to differ from those associated with flying predators, in both captive situations and the wild.

=== Cognition ===
Bigger (heavier) brains, relative to body weight, are said to be correlated with, and are implied to be causally linked to, better cognitive performance on a variety of tasks, e.g., Jerison, but see Reader and Laland and van Schaik et al. Primates tend to have relatively larger brains than other mammalian orders, or any other group of living animals, but tamarins and marmosets have relatively smaller brains than apes and other monkeys.

Reader et al. (2011), using a single measure of nonhuman primate intelligence that combined performance on a variety of cognitive laboratory tasks, showed that callitrichid primates (lion tamarins, tamarins, and marmosets) perform poorly compared to apes, macaques, baboons, capuchin monkeys, and even lemurs and lorises. Lion tamarins (species of the genus Leontopithecus) had the lowest value of this intelligence measure among all primate genera in this dataset. In similar comparative studies of primate cognitive performance, by Deaner et al., members of the marmoset genus Callithrix were ranked 23rd of 24 primate genera, lower than even the lemurs and lorises that were included. Lion tamarins were not tested in these studies, and extrapolation from the performance of the genus Callithrix to that of Leontopithecus should be made cautiously. Deaner et al. and Dunbar and Schulz both concluded that, in general, marmosets and tamarins (including lion tamarins) perform poorly relative to other primates on laboratory tests of non-social problem-solving and strategic thinking.

Other papers have included or focused on lion tamarin cognitive performance. Day et al. studied the extraction of foods from novel puzzle-boxes by captive lion tamarins, other tamarins, and marmosets. The lion tamarins (study subjects included black and golden-headed lion tamarins in addition to golden lion tamarins) began working on the tasks significantly faster and had more successful task solutions than either the other tamarins or the marmosets. Menzel and Beck conducted a study of spatial memory and detour behavior by a family group of six golden lion tamarins that were living in a large, outdoor free-ranging zoo exhibit. When their preferred arboreal travel routes were severed, the tamarins learned quickly how to find and navigate detours.

=== Tool use ===
Stoinski and Beck reported observations of golden lion tamarins using and modifying tools while living in free-ranging zoo exhibits. Eight different individual golden lion tamarins were seen to spontaneously use tools and three individuals were seen to modify tools. The tamarins used twigs, which in some cases they broke off prior to use, as well as the wire antennas of their radiocollars. The most common modes of tool use were prying under tree bark and probing in tree crevices while foraging for animal prey, and probing on skin and through fur during allo- and auto-grooming. The total number of tool use bouts was not reported, but Stoinski and Beck stated that "the behavior was frequent, occurring at least weekly" (p 321). Tool use was developed independently within several different groups of free-ranging golden lion tamarins.

Following Shumaker et al.'s definitions of tool use and manufacture, golden lion tamarins are one of only two callitrichid species documented to have used tools. The other reported case of callitrichid tool use was also from a lion tamarin - one wild black lion tamarin (Leontopithecus chrysopygus) that inserted and probed with a stick between the leaves of a bromeliad to expel insects. This was the only case of tool use documented in the Kaisin et al. study, which involved observation of four groups for a total of more than 2,500 hours. For golden lion tamarins, despite thousands of hours of monitoring by skilled observers, there are no reports of tool use by wild individuals or by reintroduced individuals and their descendants.

Shumaker et al. emphasized that tool use is not unequivocally an indicator of intelligence; much animal tool use is based on simple associative learning processes or genetically programmed behaviors. However, the golden lion tamarins described by Stoinski and Beck exhibited flexibility when modifing and using different types of tools (twigs, wire), in several different ways (inserting, probing, prying, reaching), on different substrates (bark, tree holes, skin), and in different contexts (foraging, grooming).

=== Social structure ===
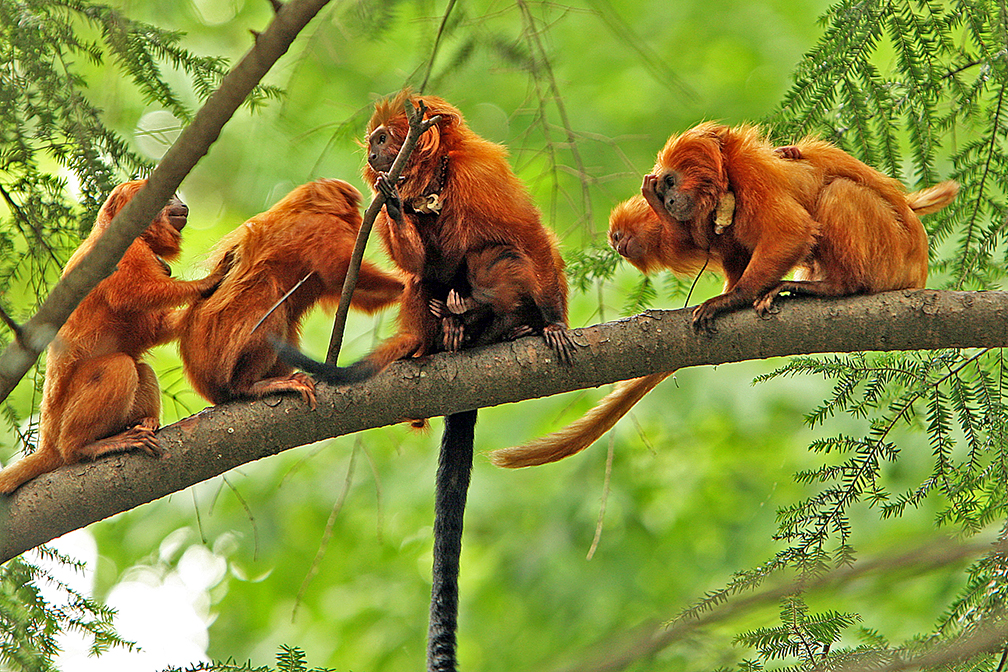
Family groups may consist of up to eight members.

Golden lion tamarins are social and groups typically consist of two to eight members. These groups usually consist of one breeding adult male and female but may also have two or three males and one female or the reverse. Other members include subadults, juveniles, and infants of either sex. These individuals are typically the offspring of the adults. When more than one breeding adult is in a group, one is usually dominant over the other, which is maintained through aggressive behavior. The dominance relationship between males and females depends on longevity in the group. A newly immigrated male is subordinate to the resident adult female that inherited her rank from her mother. Both males and females may leave their natal groups at the age of four, but females may replace their mothers as the breeding adult, if they die, which will lead to the dispersal of the breeding male who is likely her father. This does not happen with males and their fathers. Dispersing males join groups with other males and remain in them until they find an opportunity to immigrate to a new group. The vast majority of recruits to groups are males. A male may find an opportunity to enter into a group when the resident male dies or disappears. Males may also aggressively displace resident males from their group; this is usually done by two immigrant males that are likely brothers. When this happens, only one of the new males is able to breed and suppresses the reproduction of the other. A resident male may also leave a vacancy when his daughter becomes the breeding female and he must disperse to avoid inbreeding.

=== Communication ===
Like other callitrichids, golden lion tamarins use auditory, olfactory, and visual signals to communicate within and between groups.

==== Vocal communication ====
Because the dense structure of their rainforest habitat limits opportunity for visual signaling, golden lion tamarins rely mostly on sound for real-time communication about group movement, availability of food, predator presence, and intergroup spacing, and they vocalize at a high rate during daily group activities. The most extensive published study on within-group vocal behavior in wild golden lion tamarins reported that adults emitted an average of 2.1 vocalizations/minute.

Ruiz-Miranda and Kleiman identified a repertoire of 15 to 21 vocalizations, grouped into six categories defined by acoustic similarities - tonal, atonal, clucks, trills, multisyllable calls, and combination calls. Note that other published reports have each used different names and grouping systems for golden lion tamarin calls.

Most of their vocalizations appear to provide information about the caller - identity, location, activity, and perhaps intent. However, some vocalizations appear to provide information external to the caller, including alarm calls to the presence of a predator. Boinski and coauthors reported that different within-group call types tended to each be associated with specific behavioral or spatial contexts, thus provided accurate, "honest" information about the caller to the rest of the group.

Long calls are loud, relatively long vocalizations used by golden lion tamarins both for within-group and between-group communications related to intergroup spacing, including during territorial encounters between neighboring groups.

Young golden lion tamarins are also highly vocal, and may call at up to three times the rate of adults. Up to nine months of age, they mostly use loud rasps (one of the "atonal" vocalizations), medium or long trills, or combinations of rasps and trills. Early, before two months of age, these vocalizations are given by an infant thought to be signaling to be nursed or picked up by an adult. As immature golden lion tamarins begin eating solid food, these rasps and trills are used persistently while begging for food from other group members.

==== Olfactory communication ====
Like other marmosets and tamarins, golden lion tamarins scent-mark using multiple glandular regions. Research on other callitrichids indicates that scent marks allow receivers to differentiate individuals and determine sex, dominance status, and female reproductive status, and this may be true for golden lion tamarins, as well.

Studies on scent-marking in zoo and wild golden lion tamarins have led researchers to propose specific within- and between-group communication functions that may vary by sex and dominance status, and that scent may serve as a marker for important ecological resources. However, challenges in ascribing or excluding particular functions for scent-marking in callitrichids have been noted in studies on other callitrichid species, including conflicting interpretations of scent-marking data from wild moustached tamarins (Saguinus mystax) (compare with) and saddleback tamarins (Saguinus fuscicollis) (compare and with). Further, a summary largely focused on cottontop tamarins (Saguinus oedipus) and common marmosets (Callithrix jacchus) demonstrates the complex relationship between social context and chemical communication in callitrichids.

==== Visual communication ====
A small array of visual signals has been described for golden lion tamarins. The most striking of the visual signals are the arch displays. Similar displays have been described for many New World monkeys, including callitrichid and noncallitrichid species. The arch walk, the highest intensity of the golden lion tamarins arch displays, is characterized by erected fur, lowered head, forward-directed gaze, strongly arched back, rigid limbs, and tail held down and pressed forward(p 130). The arch-walking individual typically walks away from the apparent target of the signal. It has been noted that the arch display "makes the animal look larger and more conspicuous"(p 251). The within-group functional significance of this striking but infrequent behavior is not entirely clear; see (p 252), and particularly for discussion of this behavior's context and potential meanings.

Other visual signals reported from zoo environments are summarized in and additional behaviors from both zoos and the wild are reported elsewhere (Oliveira et al. 2003).

=== Reproduction ===
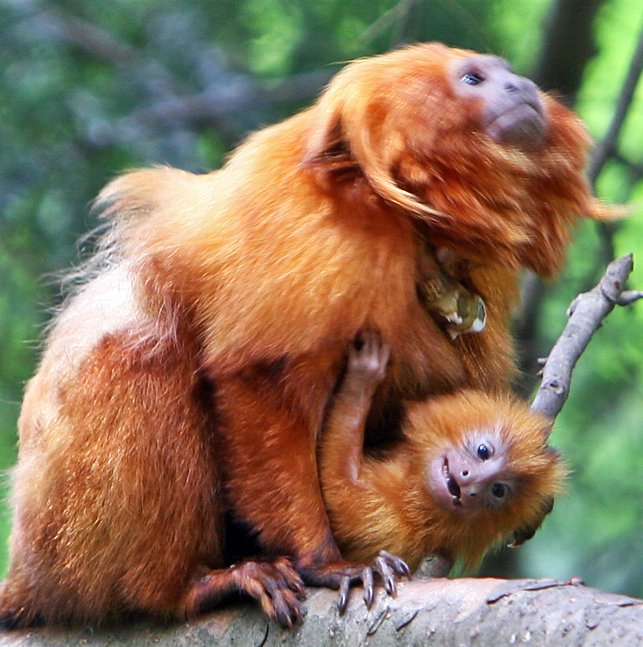
The mother provides transportation at the early stages of the infant's life.

The mating system of the golden lion tamarin is largely monogamous. When two adult males are in a group, only one of them mates with the female. There are cases of a male mating with two females, usually a mother and daughter. Reproduction is seasonal and depends on rainfall. Mating is at its highest at the end of the rainy season between late March to mid-June, and births peak during the September–February rains. Females are sexually mature between 15 and 20 months old, but they cannot reproduce until 30 months old. Only dominant females can reproduce and will suppress the reproduction of the other females in the group. Males may reach puberty by 28 months. Tamarins have a four-month gestation period. Golden lion tamarin groups exhibit cooperative rearing of the infants, because tamarins commonly give birth to twins, and to a lesser extent, triplets and quadruplets. For example, 78% of recorded births in 2001 in the Poço das Antas Reserve consisted of twins. A mother is not able to provide for her litter and needs the help of the other members of the group. The younger members of the groups may lose breeding opportunities, but they gain parental experience in helping to rear their younger siblings. In their first 4 weeks, the infants are completely dependent on their mother for nursing and carrying. By week five, the infants spend less time on their mother's back and begin to explore their surroundings. Young reach their juvenile stage at 17 weeks and begin to socialize with other group members. The subadult phase is reached at 14 months, when a tamarin first displays adult behaviors.

== Conservation ==
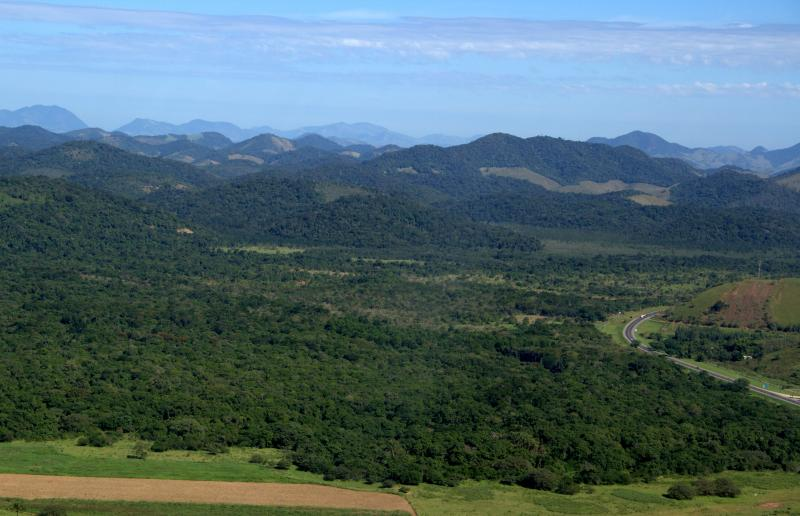
Aerial view of Poço das Antas Biological Reserve

The geographic ranges of and available habitats for golden lion tamarins have both shrunk drastically in the five centuries since the arrival of Portuguese explorers in Brazil in 1500. However, no estimates of the size of the population before 1500 are known, and the first published estimates did not appear until the 1970s. By then, golden lion tamarin population estimates ranged from only 100 to 600 surviving individuals, although these estimates were not based on range-wide censuses. The first such census, carried out in 1990-1992, counted about 560 wild individuals and about 100 additional individuals from the reintroduction program were living in the wild. Since then, the population has grown significantly, following conservation efforts that include reintroduction of zoo-born animals and rescue and translocation of wild individuals from small, at-risk forest fragments (both largely to areas then unoccupied by tamarins), reforestation with a particular focus on connecting separated areas of habitat, and community-based conservation and engagement programs. Most recently, a 2022/2023 census estimated more than 4,800 golden lion tamarins living in the current primary area of occurrence in the noncoastal area of the São João and Macaé River basins, with unknown but smaller additional numbers in limited coastal forests and to the west of the primary area of occurrence.

The Associação Mico-Leão-Dourado (Golden Lion Tamarin Association) is a Brazilian not-for-profit focused on conservation of golden lion tamarins in their primary area of occurrence. The association has identified a number of ongoing threats to continued recovery of the species. Key threats include habitat loss and fragmentation, hunting and trapping for the pet trade, the recently highlighted threat of a yellow fever or other disease epidemics, and the potential impact of non-native species, most notably the introduced marmoset species that are now found in many of the forest areas occupied by golden lion tamarins, and a feral population of introduced golden-headed lion tamarins (Leontopithecus chrysomelas) within 50 km of the geographic range of the golden lion tamarin, presenting a threat of hybridization (most of the golden-headed lion tamarins were removed between 2015 and 2018).

Although not specifically identified in association publications, climate change may also present a threat to long-term survival for golden lion tamarins. Meyer and coauthors used climate-change modeling to estimate how much of the historic geographic ranges of the four lion tamarin (Leontopithecus) species would be suitable for their survival in 2050 and 2080. They concluded that the amount of climatically suitable habitat for golden lion tamarins would be severely reduced by 2050 and insufficient for population survival by 2080. The authors stressed caution in interpreting and acting on this conclusion because of numerous uncertainties in the modeling process.

Key events in the conservation of golden lion tamarins outlined below describe past and ongoing efforts to address many of these threats.

- 1970s: Following their field studies, which indicate a small, declining wild population of golden lion tamarins, Adelmar Coimbra-Filho and Alceo Magnanini championed efforts that resulted in the 1974 creation of the federal Poço das Antas Biological Reserve. In 1980, there were an estimated 75 to 150 golden lion tamarins living within the reserve.
- 1983: The Golden Lion Tamarin Conservation Program began activities in Brazil, launching the first systematic field studies of behavioral ecology of golden lion tamarins in the Poço das Antas Biological Reserve, later expanding to the União Biological Reserve and reintroduction sites, and initiating a community-based environmental education program in the area surrounding Poço das Antas. The program's successor, the Associação Mico-Leão-Dourado, a Brazilian not-for-profit, was launched in 1992 and is active today.
- 1984: The first zoo-born tamarins were reintroduced into the wild. Reintroductions, totaling 146 zoo-born golden lion tamarins, continued between 1984 and 2000.

1994 (through 1997): Forty-three wild tamarins were rescued from small, at-risk forest fragments and translocated to the site of the future União Biological Reserve.

1997: Reforestation efforts were begun by the Associação Mico-Leão-Dourado, with a focus on creating forested corridors to connect separated forest fragments, thus connecting separated subpopulations of golden lion tamarins. By 2022, the association had planted a total of 4.4 km^{2} (1.7 sq mi) with native forest trees in Poço das Antas Biological Reserve and on 15 private farms with tamarins.

1998: A second federally protected area for golden lion tamarins, the União Biological Reserve, was created. This area had been the release site for tamarins translocated from smaller forest fragments in 1994-1997.

2003: Golden lion tamarin conservation status improved from critically endangered to endangered in the IUCN Red List of threatened species.

2007-2024: The Associação Mico-Leão-Dourado acquired several privately held properties. Each provides opportunities for reforestation to establish critical forest connections between separated golden lion tamarin subpopulations.

2016: The Associação Mico-Leão-Dourado adopted an overall 2025 goal of 2,000 wild golden lion tamarins living in 25,000 ha (61,766 acres; 250 km^{2}, 97 miles^{2}) of connected and protected habitat, which computer modeling suggested would achieve 100% probability of species survival for the next 100 years, with retention of 98% of (then current) genetic diversity during that period.

2016-2019: An outbreak of yellow fever caused extensive mortality among golden lion tamarins, killing around 30% of the wild population, including most or all of the tamarins in the Poço das Antas Biological Reserve. The Brazilian primatological and public health communities recognized yellow fever as an existential threat to nonhuman primate populations, and developed a dosage of surplus human yellow fever vaccine appropriate for smaller body-sized animals. After the Rio de Janeiro Primate Center tested the vaccine's efficacy and safety on lion tamarins housed there, Associação Mico-Leão-Dourado biologists begin vaccinating wild tamarins in 2021, apparently the first such program for wild individuals of an endangered primate. As of the end of 2024, 489 individuals had been vaccinated.

2020: Wildlife passageways across the recently widened highway BR-101 were completed, including one land bridge (was being forested) and 10 canopy overpasses. BR-101 runs adjacent to a portion of Poço das Antas Biological Reserve and between the two sections of União Biological Reserve, as well as separating Poço das Antas and one section of União from relatively large tamarin subpopulations on the northern side of the highway. The company that designed and constructed the highway expansion was legally required to fund these mitigating actions to maintain and expand fragment connectivity and reduce traffic-related wildlife deaths on this busy highway. Tamarins were already using two of the canopy overpasses by late 2021.

2022/2023: The fourth census of wild golden lion tamarins showed an estimated population of more than 4,800 in the species' primary area of occurrence, indicating rapid recovery from the yellow fever epidemic.

=== Reintroduction ===
In the early 1980s, the Smithsonian National Zoological Park and the Rio de Janeiro Primate Center initiated a program to reintroduce captive-born golden lion tamarins to bolster the existing wild population, thought to be no more than 600 individuals at the time. From 1984 to 2000, as part of the Golden Lion Tamarin Conservation Program (and later the Associação Mico Leão Dourado), 146 captive-born and seven confiscated wild-born golden lion tamarins were released into the wild; 17 of these were released in the Poço das Antas Biological Reserve, early in the program, and the remainder on 20 privately owned ranches and farms in the species' historic area of occurrence. The animals had been born at or lived in 43 different zoos and research centers in Brazil, Europe, and the United States. None of the release sites, including the specific release sites in Poço das Antas, was thought to have wild golden lion tamarins at the time of the reintroductions.

The reintroduced, captive-born golden lion tamarins all had prerelease veterinary examinations. Those from Europe or the United States were quarantined for 30 days, either at one of several designated zoo quarantine facilities before shipment or at the Rio de Janeiro Primate Center after arrival in Brazil. All of the captive-born individuals were acclimated for at least 24 hours in outdoor cages at the reintroduction sites before their release. The animals were monitored on five or six days per week for at least three months after being released. Most were given supplementary food and artificial shelter boxes for at least several months, and were captured and returned to the release site if they got lost. This intensive postrelease support improved early survival rate, although efforts to train tamarins in survival-critical skills before release did not appear to affect postrelease survival.

Over time, some of the reintroduced golden lion tamarins and/or their offspring were translocated to eight other privately owned locations, and recovery of forests on private lands has also allowed the tamarins to expand on their own to additional ranches and farms. As of 2022, 22 of the farms and ranches with golden lion tamarins were official private nature reserves. At the time of the most recent census, in 2022/2023, an estimated 2,256 surviving descendants of reintroduced golden lion tamarins remained, representing almost half (46%) of the total estimated population in the species' primary area of occurrence, in the noncoastal area of the São João and Macaé River basins in the Brazilian state of Rio de Janeiro.

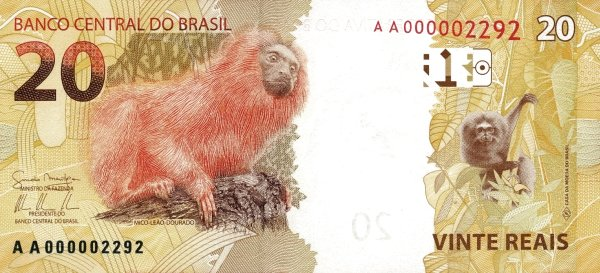
Golden lion tamarin on the Brazilian Real R$20 banknote

=== Translocation ===
During a 1990-1992 survey, a number of golden lion tamarin groups were identified in very small and/or immediately imperiled forest fragments in the Rio de Janeiro State municipalities of Cabo Frio, Búzios, Saquarema, and Araruama. Between 1994 and 1997, under the administration of the Associação Mico-Leão-Dourado (Golden Lion Tamarin Association), 43 individuals from some of these forest remnants, in Cabo Frio, Búzios, and Saquarema (si family groups and one single individual), were rescued and translocated to the location of what would become (in 1998) the União Biological Reserve. The reserve lies within the species' historic area of occurrence but had no resident golden lion tamarins at the time. The two primary goals of the translocation program were to rescue imminently threatened golden lion tamarins and to add genetic diversity to the more protected part of the population.

The population at the União reserve has grown substantially since the initial translocations. The population had already grown to 120 by December 2000, and to more than 220 in 30 family groups by 2006. The most recent census, carried out in 2022-2023, estimated that 473 descendants of the original translocated golden lion tamarins existed. This represented 10% of the total estimated 2022-2023 population of 4,869 in the species' primary area of occurrence in the non-coastal area of the São João and Macaé river basins (calculated from, Supplementary Materials).
