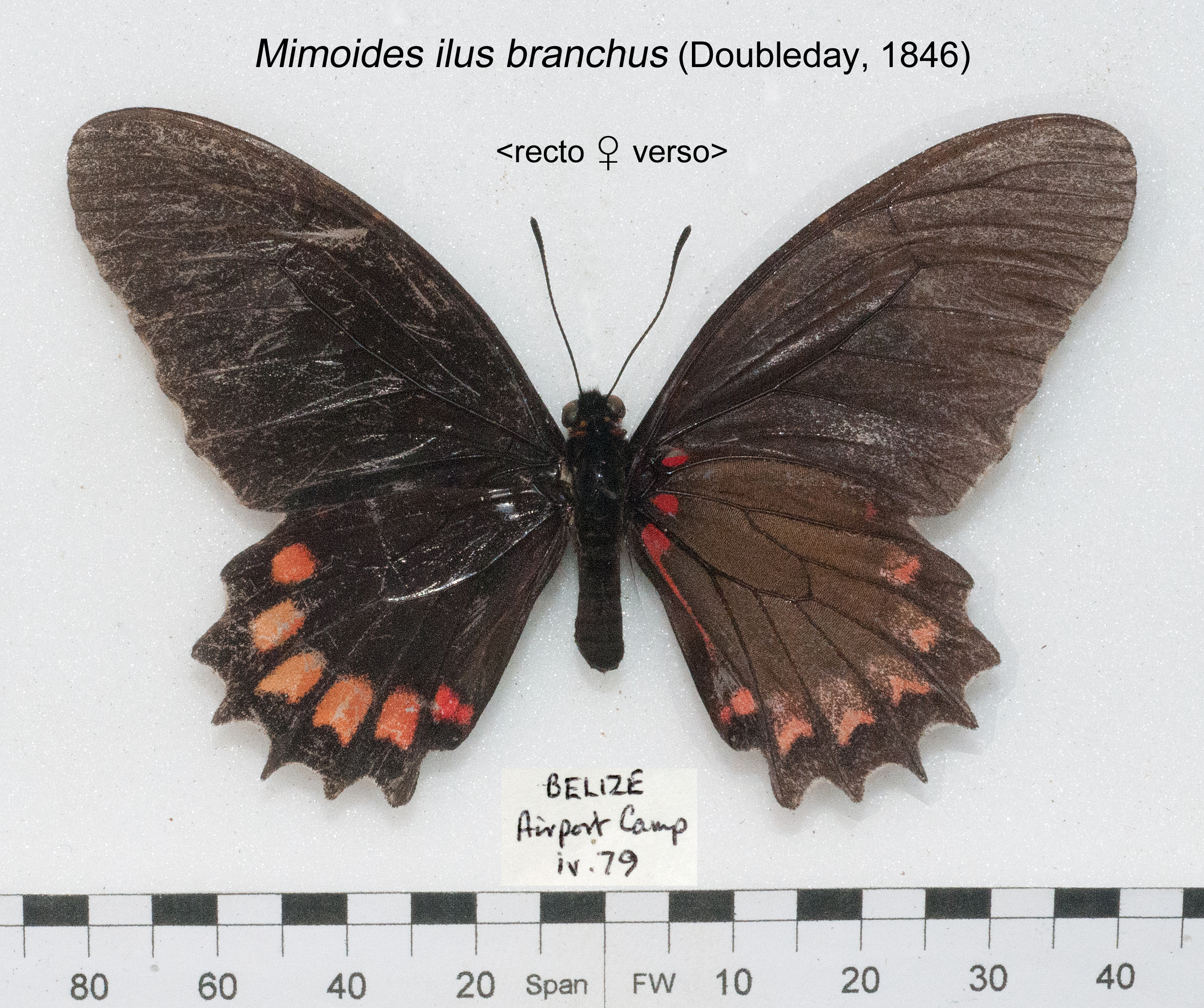
- M. i. branchus

Scientific classification
- Kingdom: Animalia
- Phylum: Arthropoda
- Clade: Pancrustacea
- Class: Insecta
- Order: Lepidoptera
- Family: Papilionidae
- Genus: Mimoides
- Species: M. ilus

Binomial name
- Mimoides ilus (Fabricius, 1793)

Synonyms
- Papilio ilus Fabricius, 1793; Papilio hostilius C. Felder & R. Felder, 1861; Papilio guaco Staudinger, 1876; Eurytides branchus Doubleday, 1846

= Mimoides ilus =

Ilus swallowtail

Species of butterfly

Mimoides ilus, the Ilus swallowtail or dual-spotted swallowtail, is a species of butterfly in the family Papilionidae. It is found from Mexico to Colombia and Venezuela. Little is known about this rare butterfly, but it is not considered threatened. The larvae of M. i. branchus feed on Annotata reticulata.

== Subspecies ==
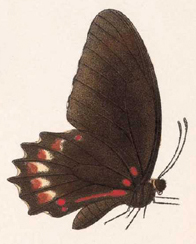
M. i. branchus

- Mimoides ilus ilus (Fabricius, 1793) (Panama to northern Colombia and central Venezuela)
- Mimoides ilus branchus (Doubleday, 1846) (eastern Mexico to northern Costa Rica)
- Mimoides ilus occiduus (Vázquez, 1957) (western Mexico)

== Description from Seitz ==
P. ilus F. (= hostilius Fldr.; guaco Stgr. (14a). Male and female: under surface without red basal spots on the forewing, with 4 red basal spots on the hindwing. Forewing with or without a patch in the extremity of the cell, with 2 or 3 white spots on the disc, the posterior one, placed behind the 3. median, the largest. North Venezuela, Northern Colombia, Panama; rare in collections.

Seitz Plate 14 belesisand branchus
