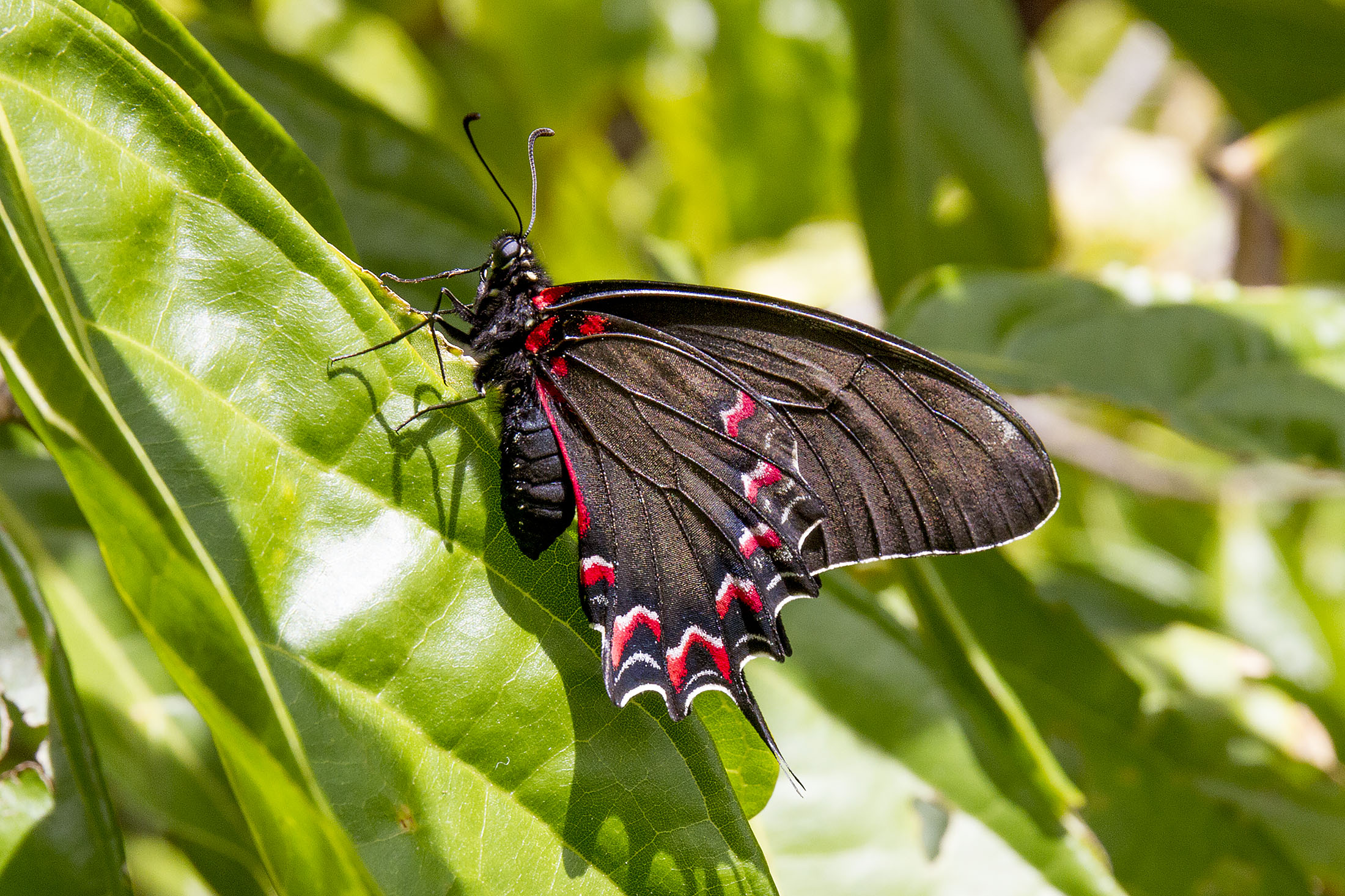
- Mimoides thymbraeus

Scientific classification
- Kingdom: Animalia
- Phylum: Arthropoda
- Clade: Pancrustacea
- Class: Insecta
- Order: Lepidoptera
- Family: Papilionidae
- Genus: Mimoides
- Species: M. thymbraeus

Binomial name
- Mimoides thymbraeus (Boisduval, 1836)

Synonyms
- Papilio thymbraeus Boisduval, 1836; Papilio thymbraeus ab. pallida (Vázquez, 1949)

= Mimoides thymbraeus =

White-crescent swallowtail

Species of butterfly

Mimoides thymbraeus, the white-crescent swallowtail, is a species of butterfly in the family Papilionidae. It is found from Mexico to El Salvador and Honduras, where it is widespread and common.

== Subspecies ==
- Mimoides thymbraeus thymbraeus (Boisduval, 1836) (southeastern Mexico to El Salvador and Honduras)
- Mimoides thymbraeus aconophos (Gray [1853]) (western Mexico)

== Description from Seitz ==
P. thymbraeus has small spots on head and breast grey-yellow, often slightly reddish. Upperside of the wings slightly but yet distinctly metallic blue or green; forewing without markings, but with white fringes; hindwing with a slender tail and 1 or 2 rows of spots between cell and margin. Under surface with red costal basal spot on the forewing and 4 basal spots on the hindwing. Larva on Chirimoya; the thorax dotted with blue and yellow; striped with white and black from the 4. segment backwards, the white stripes with small blue and yellow spots, the sides blue, from the 5. segment dotted with yellow. Pupa green, as in the allied species, appearing constricted at the base of the abdomen. The butterfly flies in the open country the whole year through, and is rather common at a height of 500 to 1560 m. —thymbraeus Boisd. (14 b) is distributed from East Mexico to Honduras. The hindwing in male and female has 2 rows of red spots. — In aconophos Gray the hindwing has only one row of red spots, the discal row is absent. Central and West Mexico.
