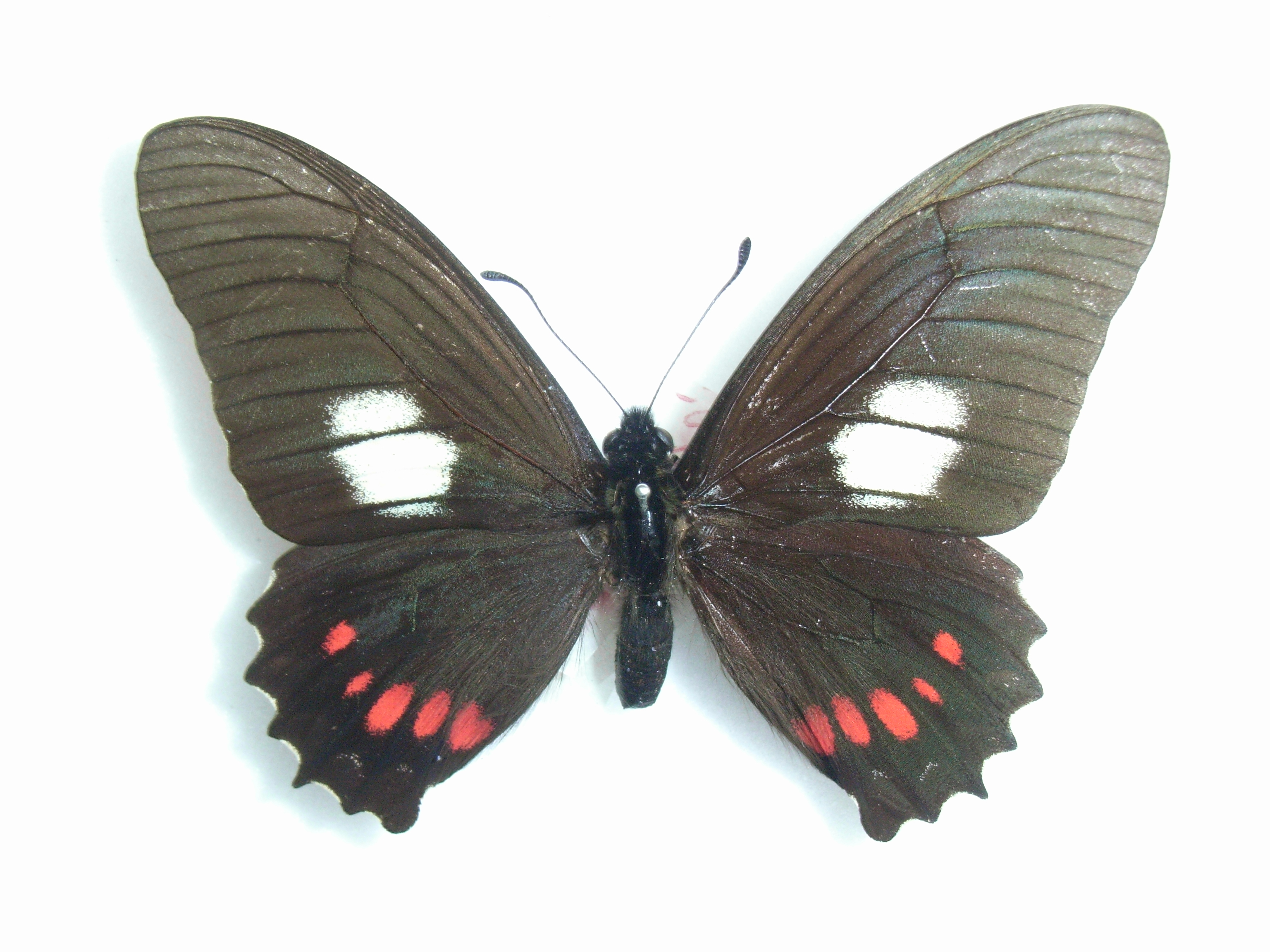
- Mimoides xeniades

Scientific classification
- Kingdom: Animalia
- Phylum: Arthropoda
- Class: Insecta
- Order: Lepidoptera
- Family: Papilionidae
- Tribe: Leptocircini
- Genus: Mimoides; K.S. Brown, 1991

Species
- see text

Synonyms
- Eurytides

= Mimoides =

Genus of butterflies

Mimoides is a genus of butterflies in the family Papilionidae. The species native to the Americas were formerly in genus Eurytides.

== Species ==
- Mimoides ariarathes (Esper, 1788)
- Mimoides euryleon (Hewitson, [1856]) – false cattleheart swallowtail
- Mimoides ilus (Fabricius, 1793) – Ilus swallowtail or dual-spotted swallowtail
- Mimoides lysithous (Hübner, [1821])
- Mimoides microdamas (Burnmeister, 1878)
- Mimoides pausanias (Hewitson, 1852) – bluish mimic-swallowtail or Pausanias swallowtail
- Mimoides phaon (Boisduval, 1836) – variable swallowtail or red-sided swallowtail
- Mimoides protodamas (Godart, 1819)
- Mimoides thymbraeus (Boisduval, 1836) – white-crescent swallowtail
- Mimoides xeniades (Hewitson, 1867)
- Mimoides xynias (Hewitson, 1875)
