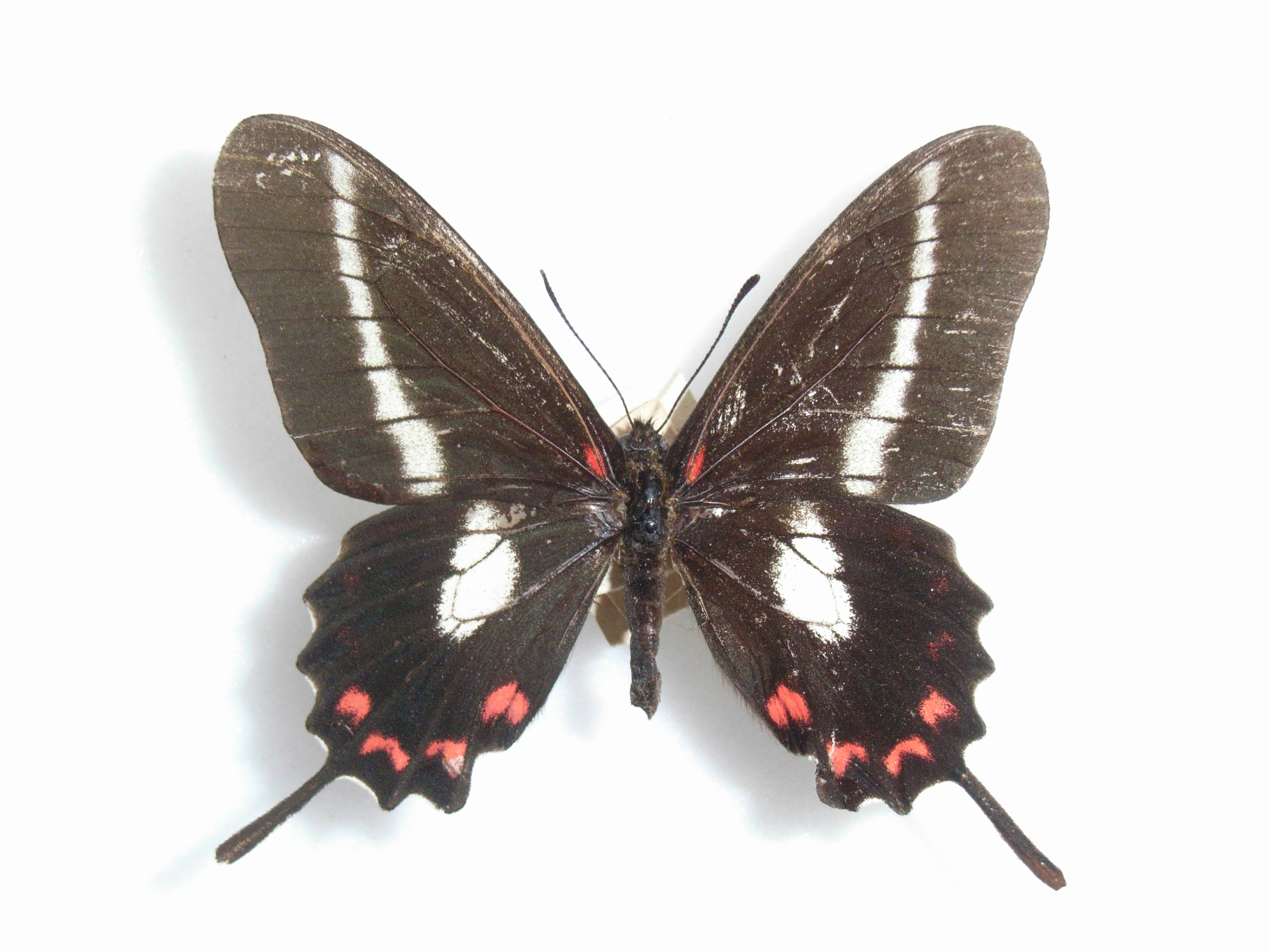

Scientific classification
- Kingdom: Animalia
- Phylum: Arthropoda
- Clade: Pancrustacea
- Class: Insecta
- Order: Lepidoptera
- Family: Papilionidae
- Genus: Mimoides
- Species: M. lysithous

Binomial name
- Mimoides lysithous (Hübner, [1821])

Synonyms
- Hectorides lysithous Hübner, [1821]; Papilio lysithouse var. brevifasciatus Weymer, 1895; Papilio extendatus Weymer, 1895; Papilio lysithous f. lucius Rousseau-Decelle, 1943; Papilio eupatorion Lucas, [1859]; Papilio patrona Gray, 1856; Papilio pomponius Hopffer, 1866; Papilio lysithous f. plaumanni Krüger, 1934; Papilio kumbachi Vogeler, 1935; Papilio harrisianus Swainson, 1822; Papilio claudius Boisduval, 1836; Papilio athous C. & R. Felder, 1864; Papilio lysithous f. platydesma Rothschild & Jordan, 1906; Papilio rurik Eschscholtz, 1821; Papilio laius Boisduval, 1836; Papilio sebastianus Oberthür, 1879; Papilio oedipus C. & R. Felder, 1864

= Mimoides lysithous =

Species of butterfly

Mimoides lysithous is a species of butterfly in the family Papilionidae. It is found in the Neotropical realm.

== Subspecies ==
- M. l. lysithous Brazil (Rio Grande do Sul, Santa Catarina)
- M. l. eupatorion (Lucas, [1859]) Brazil (Rio Grande do Sul, Santa Catarina)
- M. l. harrisianus (Swainson, 1822) Brazil (Rio de Janeiro, ...)
- M. l. rurik (Eschscholtz, 1821) Brazil (Santa Catarina, ...)
- M. l. sebastianus (Oberthür, 1879)

== Description from Seitz ==
P. lysithous. A polychromatic species. The different individual forms with one exception were originally described as species and have been regarded as such until recently. The forms are connected with one another by intergradations; moreover, the specific identity of 3 of the varieties (pomponius, rurik, lysithous) has been proved by breeding. Underside of the forewing with 2 red basal spots, hindwing with 3; all the forms with a tail. Larva on Anona , resting by day on the upperside of a leaf at the middle vein, on the lower branches and root-shoots, near Petropolis all the year round, except in June and July (middle of the dry season); black with yellow longitudinal stripes and white-yellow saddle-spot. The pupa as in the allied species green with yellow lateral streak. Brazil and Eastern Paraguay. The principal forms, which do not everywhere occur together, are the following: f. platydesma R. & J. (= harrisianus auctt. (14b), the white band of the forewing very broad, continued over the cell to the costal margin; f. harrisianus Swains. (= claudius Boisd.; athous Fldr.), the white band of the forewing broad posteriorly, strongly narrowed anteriorly, not entering the cell, the part from the lower angle of the cell to the costal margin narrow or absent, as in the preceding form the posterior submarginal spots of the hindwing large; f. oedipus Fldr. (= sebastianus Oberth.) (14a), forewing -with double spot from the 1. median backwards, hindwing without white band, the 4 posterior submarginal spots large; f. lysithous Hbn. (14a), band of the forewing narrow, often abbreviated (ab. brevifasciatus Weym.), hindwing with small submarginal spots, the band usually only extending to the 1. median, sometimes longer and more distal (ab. extendatus f.rurik Eschsch. (= rurikia id. in tab., laius Boisd.) band of the forewing abbreviated, hindwing without white band, the 4 posterior submarginal spots rather large: f. pomponius Hopff., band of the fore wing indicated, or like that of the hindwing entirely absent: f. eupatorion Luc., both wings without discal band, forewing with yellowish marginal band and the marginal spots of the hindwing enlarged (probably an aberration, only the type known, in col. Charles Oberthur).

Seitz Plate 14
