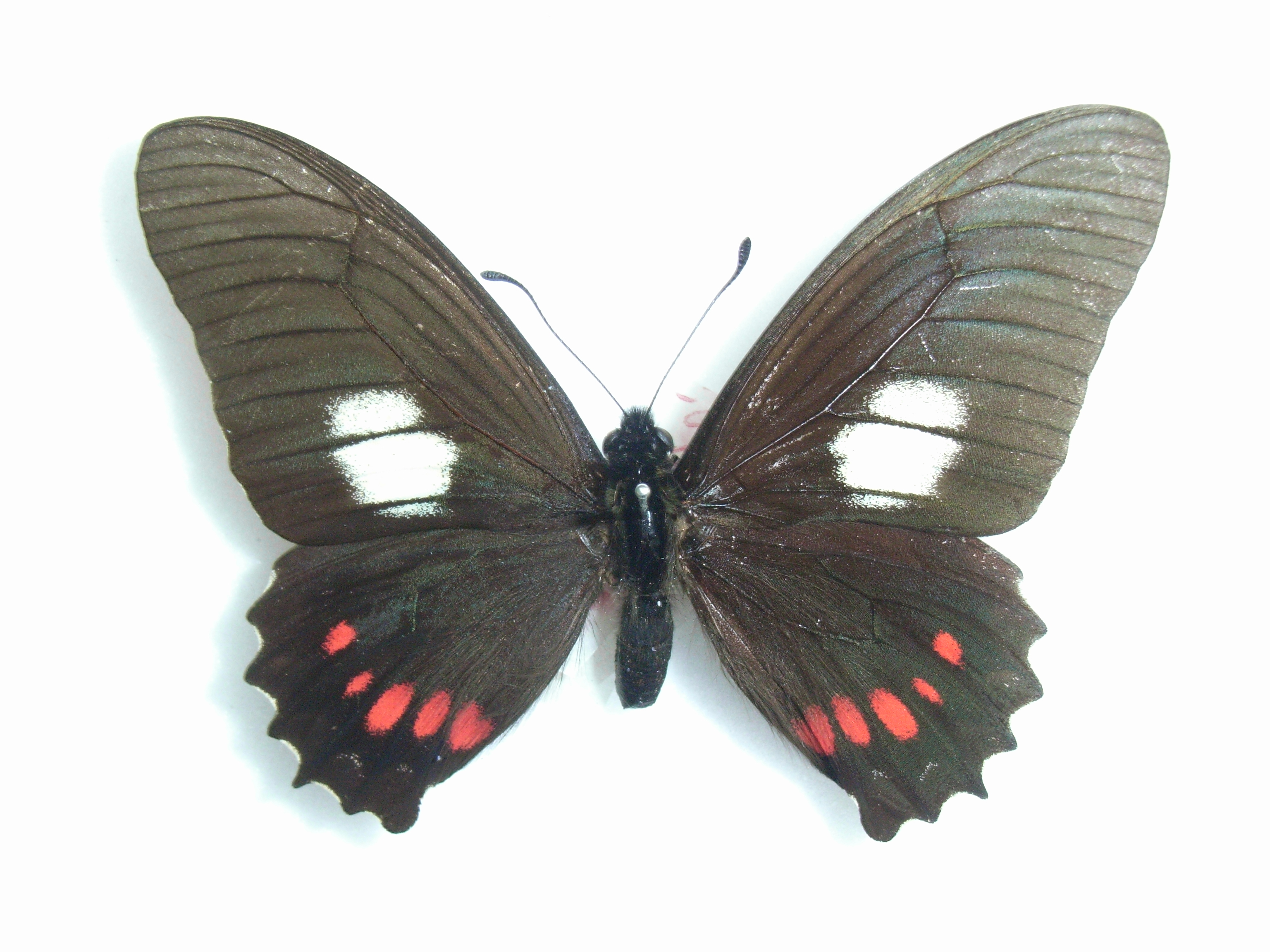

Scientific classification
- Kingdom: Animalia
- Phylum: Arthropoda
- Clade: Pancrustacea
- Class: Insecta
- Order: Lepidoptera
- Family: Papilionidae
- Genus: Mimoides
- Species: M. xeniades

Binomial name
- Mimoides xeniades (Hewitson, 1867)

Synonyms
- Papilio xeniades Hewitson, 1867; Papilio virginia Kirby, 1881; Papilio harmodius xeniades f. jarbas Niepelt, 1908; Papilio morrisi Ehrmann, 1921; Papilio harmodius halex Rothschild & Jordan, 1906; Papilio chibcha Fassl, 1912; Papilio ziegleri Ehrmann, 1921; Papilio harmodius imaus Rothschild & Jordan, 1906; Papilio harmodius vittalis Prüffer, 1922; Papilio xeniades var. isus Oberthür, 1879; Papilio aristogiton Staudinger, 1884; Papilio xeniades signatus Tyler, Brown & Wilson, 1994; Papilio harmodius Doubleday, 1846; Papilio harmodius ab. signatus Krüger, 1934; Papilio harmodius tabaconas Joicey & Talbot, 1918

= Mimoides xeniades =

Species of butterfly

Mimoides xeniades is a butterfly in the family Papilionidae. It is found in southern Bolivia, Ecuador, Colombia and Peru.

== Subspecies ==
- Mimoides xeniades xeniades (Ecuador)
- Mimoides xeniades halex (Rothschild & Jordan, 1906) (Colombia)
- Mimoides xeniades imaus (Rothschild & Jordan, 1906) (Peru)
- Mimoides xeniades isus (Oberthür, 1879) (Colombia)
- Mimoides xeniades signatus (Tyler, Brown & Wilson, 1994) (Peru, Bolivia)
- Mimoides xeniades tabaconas (Joicey & Talbot, 1918) (Peru, Ecuador)

== Description from Seitz ==
P. harmodius. Male and female different. The spots on head, thorax and coxae yellowish white, Male : fore-wing somewhat transparent apically, before the hindmargin a white area of variable extent, but never reaching to the 3. radial; hindwing with a band of red discal spots. Beneath the cell of both wings streaked with black, forewing with red costal basal spot, hindwing with 3 basal spots. In the female the hindwing similar to the male, or the macular band white or yellow; the forewing either without spots, or with white cell-patch and two large discal patches. Colombia to Bolivia; a species of the Andes, very common in the eastern valleys of Ecuador. Peru and Bolivia. Larva not known. — isus Oberth. (= aristogiton Stgr.) male : the white area of the forewing large, extending from the hindmargin to the 2. median or beyond; discal band composed of 6 or 7 white-centred spots. female not known. — Cauca Valley, Colombia. — halex R. & J. Forewing as in the preceding subspecies; hindwing with 5 red discal spots. female on the forewing with white area from the 3. radial to the 2. median and a small cell-spot; hindwing with 5 pale red discal spots. Colombia; in Bogota-collections. — xeniades to the hindmargin of the wing, usually excised at the costal side, always small on the underside; hindwing with 3—5 discal spots, which are red above, rarely whitish in the middle, and beneath always reddish white with red distal margin. female: dichromatic: female-f. androna (13d) with quite small grey scaling in and behind the cell of the forewing and 5 red discal spots on the hindwing; the second form, female-f. Virginia Kirby, is very similar to the female of P. erlaces lacydes, forewing with large white cell-spot and two large discal patches, band of the hindwing white with faint red margins. Xeniades occurs in Ecuador and West Colombia. — imaus R. & J. (14 a). Not constantly different from the male of the following subspecies, forewing above mostly with white streak at the hindmargin, beneath the white spot is usually smaller than in harmodius Doubl. female as the female-f. virginia, but the cell-spot narrowed anteriorly, the anterior discal spot reduced and the band of the hindwing yellow above, almost white beneath. Eastern slopes of the Andes of North and Central Peru. — harmodius Doubl. (13 c). male: forewing above and beneath always with large white spot, not quite reaching to the hindmargin. female: the white cell-spot does not extend across the cell; three discal spots, the 1. small, the 2. as long as the 3.; hindwing with red discal spots, larger than in the male. South-east Peru (from Chanchamayo southwards) and Bolivia. The males common, of the female only 1 specimen known (in coll. Charles Oberthur).
