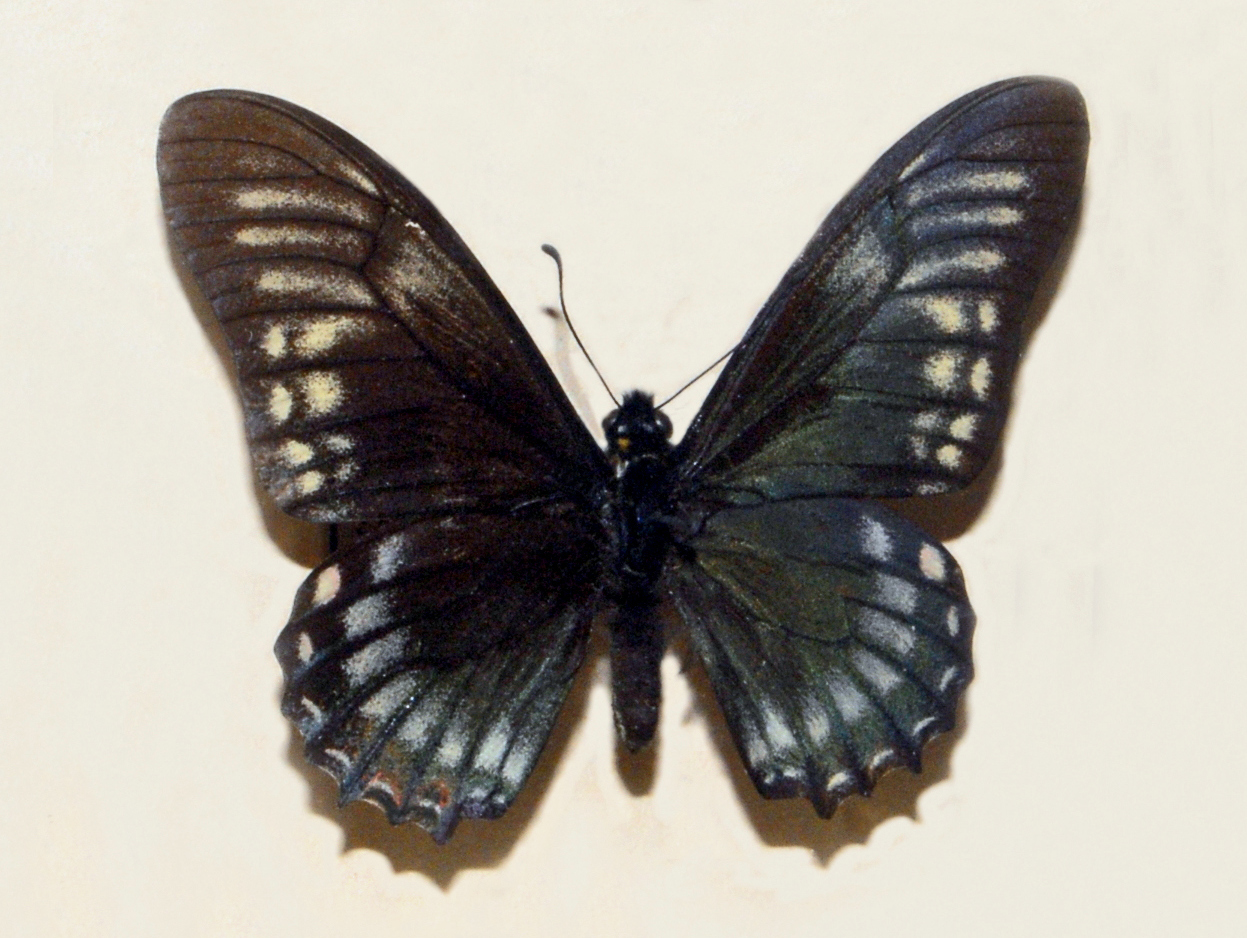
- Mounted specimen on display at Museo di Scienze Naturali Enrico Caffi, Bergamo

Scientific classification
- Kingdom: Animalia
- Phylum: Arthropoda
- Class: Insecta
- Order: Lepidoptera
- Family: Papilionidae
- Genus: Mimoides
- Species: M. protodamas

Binomial name
- Mimoides protodamas (Godart, 1819)

Synonyms
- Papilio protodamas Godart, 1819; Ithobalus hyperion Hübner, [1821]; Papilio zonaras Perty, [1833]; Papilio choridamas Boisduval, 1836

= Mimoides protodamas =

Species of butterfly

Mimoides protodamas is a species of butterfly in the family Papilionidae. The common name is false polysticto, with reference to the similarity of this species with Battus polystictus.

== Description ==
Mimoides protodamas has a wingspan reaching 70–80 millimetres (2.8–3.1 in). It is a black butterfly with rounded apex and concave outer edge of the forewings, while the outer edge of the hindwings is scalloped. The dorsal sides of the wings shows a series of whitish-bluish markings.

== Description from Seitz ==
P. protodamas Godt. (= hyperion Hbn). Forewing with yellowish area consisting of 3 large patches, or with 1 or 2 rows of spots; hindwing with yellowish grey-blue band; forewing beneath without basal spots, hindwing with 3. The scent-organ of the male wanting. Larva black, with grey and white, partly yellow stripes, the thorax dotted with white and yellow. Thoracic horn of the pupa rather thin. Two individual forms of the butterfly are known: in f. protodamas Godt. the forewing has two rows of spots, the upper ones of which are more or less merged; in f choridamas Boisd. (13b) the forewing has a very large cell-spot and two discal patches, also large. — The butterfly is entirely Brazilian; it is found from Minas Geraes to Rio Grande do Sul; but the f. choridamas does not appear to extend so far south, being only known to us from the provinces of Rio de Janeiro and Minas Geraes.

== Distribution ==
This species can be found in the Neotropical realm, in Argentina, Brazil and Paraguay.

== Gallery ==
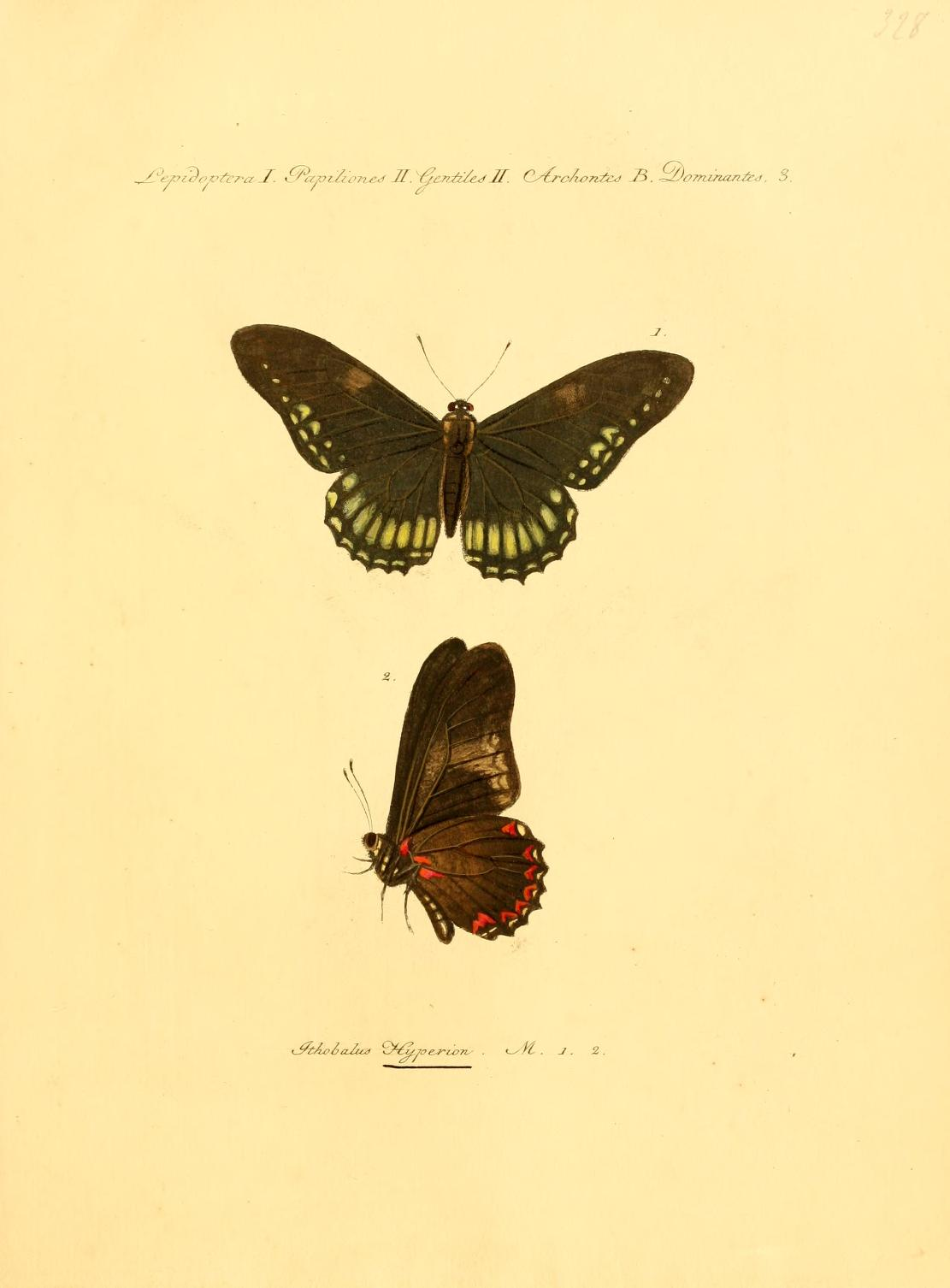
Illustration from Jacob Hübner's Sammlung exotischer Schmetterlinge Vol. 2 (1821)

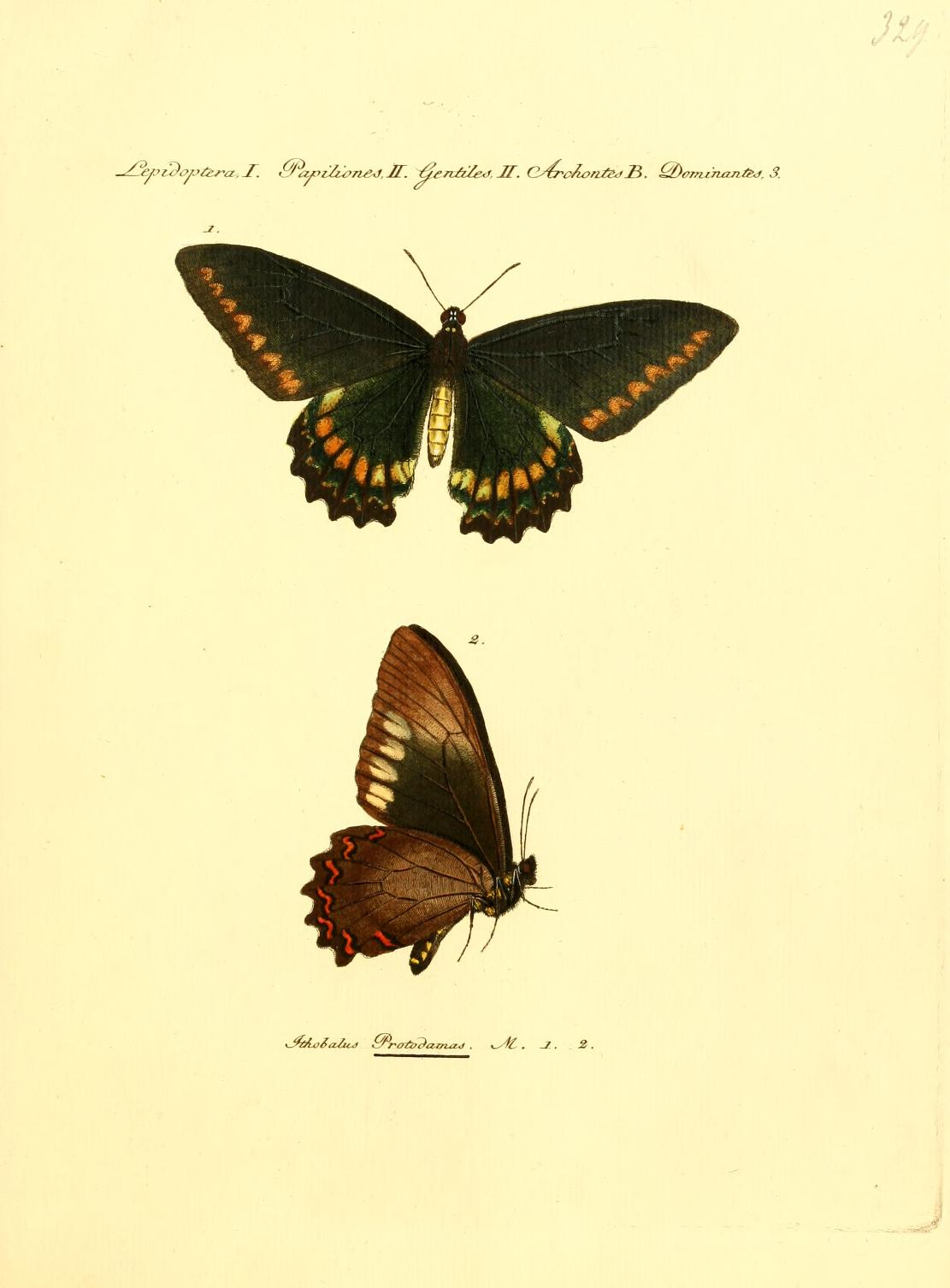
Illustration from Jacob Hübner's Sammlung exotischer Schmetterlinge Vol. 2 (1821)

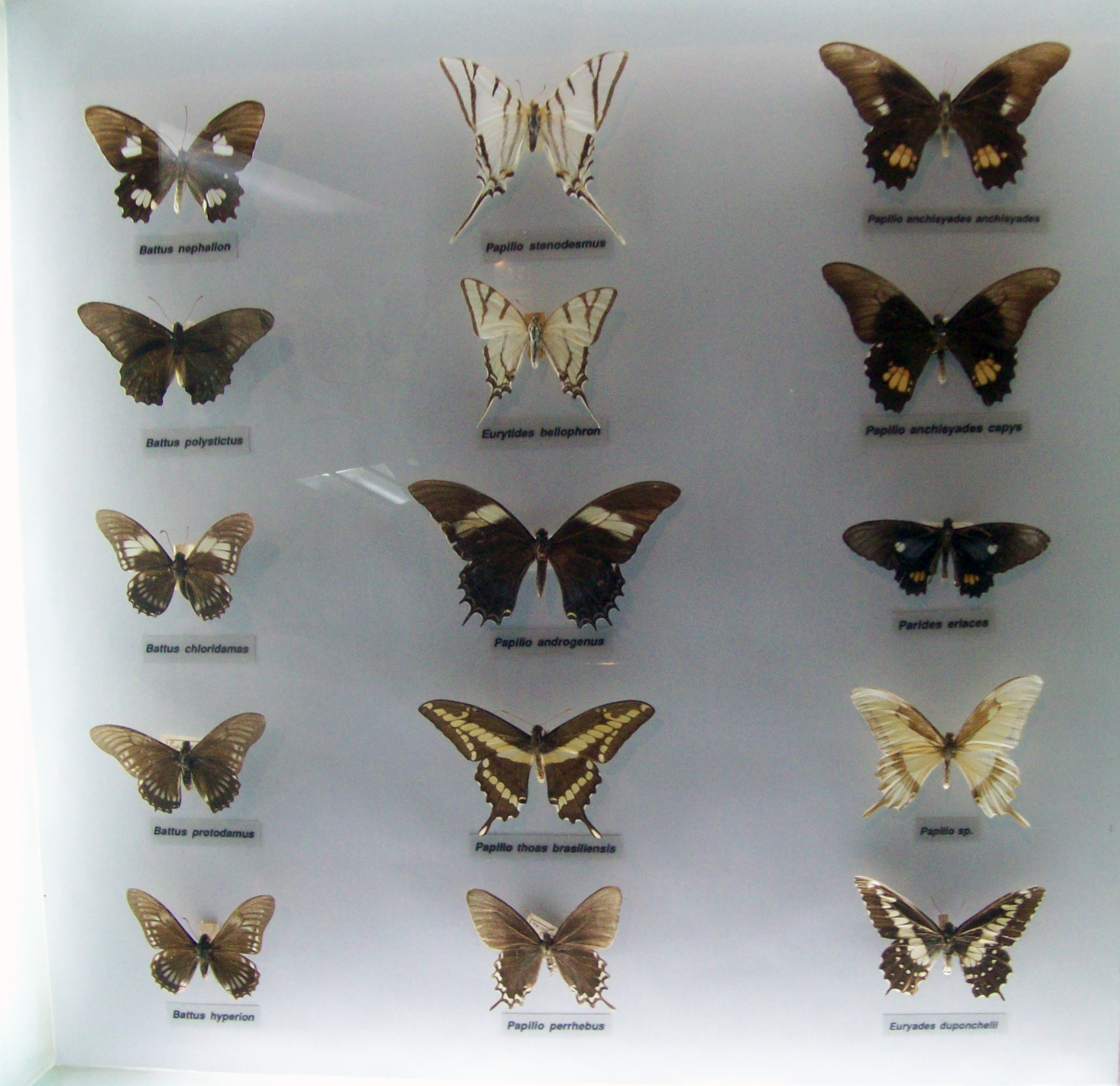
Mimoides protodamas on display at the Museo de La Plata

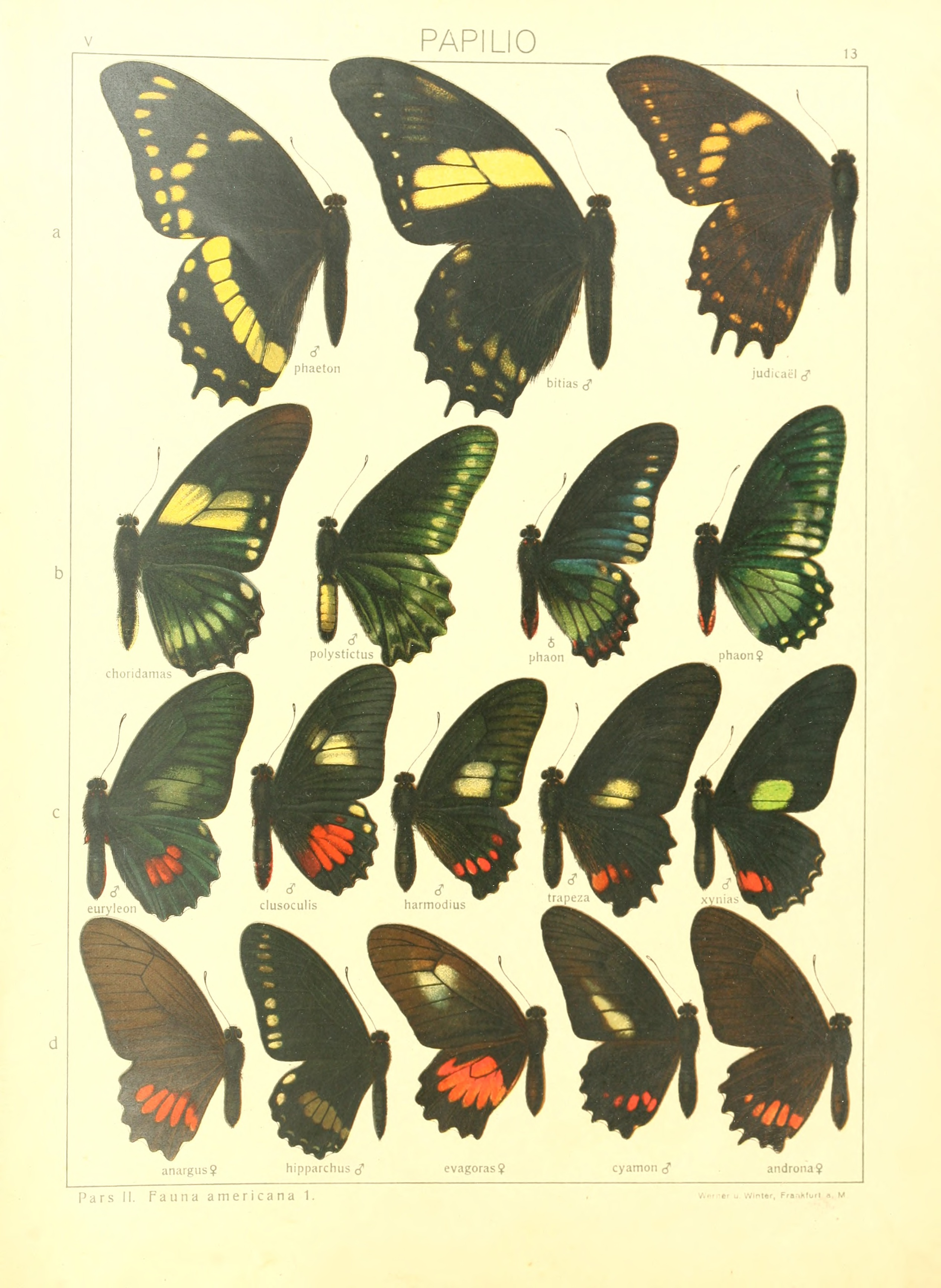
Seitz Plate 13
