= State Government Insurance Office =

State Government Insurance Office (SGIO) may refer to:

- GIO Insurance, formerly the Government Insurance Office of New South Wales
- State Government Insurance Office (Queensland)
- State Government Insurance Office (Western Australia)
