= SGIO =

SGIO may refer to:

- SGIO (Western Australia)
- State Government Insurance Office (Queensland)
