= AMI Insurance =

New Zealand insurance company

- Headquarters: Christchurch, New Zealand
- Parent organization: IAG New Zealand
- Website: www.ami.co.nz
- Formerly called: Allied Mutual Insurance

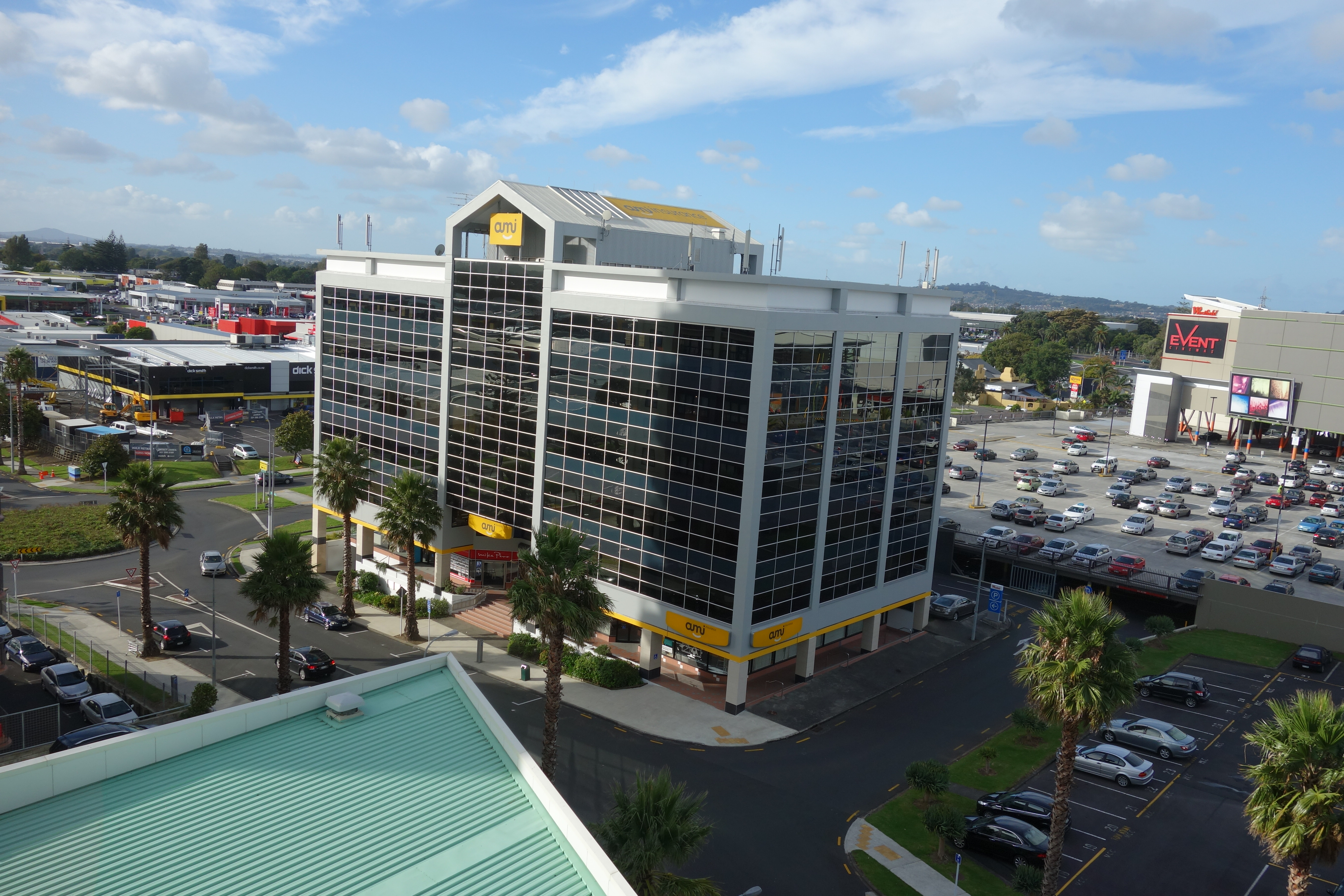
AMI Insurance building in Manukau

AMI Insurance began in Christchurch, New Zealand, in 1926 as the South Island Motor Union (SIMU), and grew to be the second biggest residential insurer in New Zealand. It was a mutual insurance company, meaning it was owned by its policy holders, until it was bought out by IAG New Zealand in 2011, following the 2011 Christchurch earthquake.

== History ==
=== Effect of Canterbury earthquakes ===
After the Christchurch earthquakes of 2010 and 2011, there was uncertainty about AMI's financial state, due to doubt over obtaining sufficient reinsurance cover for further earthquakes, plus lack of exact figures from the government's EQC to indicate how much of the earthquakes' insurance costs would have to come from Allied Mutual Insurance (AMI). The New Zealand government talked of bailing out the company up to $1,000 million because of the chaos that would ensue if it collapsed. The government eventually agreed to a NZ$500 million support deed. However, large losses led to a $76 million shortfall of its $198.6 million regulatory capital requirement and so forced the controversial sale of AMI to IAG New Zealand, the local arm of Australia and New Zealand's largest insurance company, Insurance Australia Group. IAG NZ had already acquired major insurance names in New Zealand, such as NZI (formerly New Zealand Insurance) and State Insurance, and with acquiring AMI's business (other than Christchurch earthquake-related work) IAG covered 60% of the domestic insurance market.

=== Southern Response ===
The government created a government-owned company, Southern Response Earthquake Services, to take over the part of AMI's work that related to the Christchurch earthquake repairs. It was responsible for settling claims by AMI policyholders for Canterbury earthquake damage that occurred before 5 April 2012. Perceived poor performance of that organisation led to some protests and a lawsuit, but a large percentage of the easier repairs were actioned despite a period of work outstripping resources in post-quake Canterbury.

In 2018 it was revealed that four years earlier Southern Response had employed private investigation company Thompson and Clarke to attend and record public meetings held by groups of AMI/Southern Response claimants. A report by the State Services Commission found that in doing so Southern Response had acted inconsistently with the State Services Code of conduct on a number of occasions in 2014–2016.

On 25 June 2019 Southern Response confirmed that their methods used in responding to Privacy Act 2020 and Official Information Act 1982 requests were in violation of New Zealand law. Despite this finding Southern Response said that they would trial a method that conformed with the law, but it may revert to the method in violation of the law. Southern Response said that they would not inform anyone of the incorrect responses, and refused to confirm if they have reverted to methods that makes them in violation of the law.

On 26 June 2019 the Insurance and Financial Services Ombudsman (IFSO) Scheme found that Southern Response had significantly breached the Insurance Industry Code of Ethics (Fair Insurance Code) so significantly that if it were known publicly that it could bring the entire insurance industry into disrepute. This was the first ever referral to the Insurance Council of New Zealand (ICNZ) for an unresolved significant breach. Despite the decision by the IFSO Scheme, they refused to address any matters of dishonesty by Southern Response in the complaint, instead saying that it would be investigated by ICNZ. However, ICNZ has refused to confirm if they addressed any matters of dishonesty in their hearing of the matter. Southern Response's official position, as stated by Casey Hurren, is that there is no human that knows what ICNZ's conclusion about matters of dishonesty are, including ICNZ themselves. Despite this being the most significant breach of the Code of Ethics in New Zealand history, ICNZ decided that there was no need to take any action against Southern Response.

=== 2020 closure of branches ===
On 23 July 2020, IAG announced that AMI would be closing all of its 53 branches and its remaining State office in New Zealand in phases. The Albany, Botany, Te Rapa, Mount Maunganui, Wellington, Hornby, and Dunedin offices would close in June 2021 while most remaining offices would close on 18 September. The Timaru branch would remain open until 27 November 2020. 65 branch manager jobs would be eliminated while 350 jobs would be transferred to customer service and other departments.
