= List of acts of the Parliament of Western Australia from 1992 =

This is a list of acts of the Parliament of Western Australia for the year 1992.

== 1992 ==
Short title, or popular name	Citation	Royal assent
Long title
Criminal Law Amendment Act 1992	No. 1 of 1992	7 February 1992
An Act to amend The Criminal Code and the Road Traffic Act 1974. (Note: Road Traffic Act 1974 (No. 59))
Western Australian Land Authority Act 1992	No. 35 of 1992	23 June 1992
An Act to establish an Authority as an agency to provide, or promote the provision of, land, infrastructure, facilities and services for the social and economic needs of the State, to repeal the Industrial Lands Development Authority Act 1966, (Note: Industrial Lands Development Authority Act 1966 (No. 60)) the Industrial Development (Resumption of Land) Act 1945 (Note: Industrial Development (Resumption of Land) Act 1945 (No. 49)) and the Joondalup Centre Act 1976, (Note: Joondalup Centre Act 1976 (No. 88)) and to make amendments to certain other Acts.
Governor's Establishment Act 1992	No. 39 of 1992	2 October 1992
An Act to make the Governor the employer of the staff of the Governor's Establishment and for related matters.
SGIO Privatisation Act 1992	No. 49 of 1992	9 December 1992
An Act to provide for certain government insurance business to be vested in a public company and for the public float of all shares in that company, to amend the State Government Insurance Commission Act 1986 (Note: State Government Insurance Commission Act 1986 (No. 51)) and certain other Acts and for related purposes.
Indian Ocean Territories (Administration of Laws) Act 1992	No. 54 of 1992	10 December 1992
An Act to authorize State authorities to exercise powers, perform functions and duties and provide services in or in relation to the Territories of Christmas Island and the Cocos (Keeling) Islands, to enable State courts and State judicial officers to exercise jurisdiction in or in relation to those Territories, and to authorize the State and State authorities to enter into arrangements with the Commonwealth for those purposes.
	No. X of 1992	
Disability Services Act 1992	No. 77 of 1992	18 December 1992
An Act providing for the furtherance of principles applicable to people with disabilities, for the funding of services to people with disabilities that further certain objectives, for the resolution of complaints by such people, for the establishment of the Advisory Council for Disability Services, and for related purposes.

== Sources ==
- "legislation.wa.gov.au".
