= List of acts of the Parliament of Western Australia from 1986 =

This is a list of acts of the Parliament of Western Australia for the year 1986.

== 1986 ==
Short title, or popular name	Citation	Royal assent
Long title
Mining (Validation and Amendment) Act 1986	No. 1 of 1986	26 June 1986
An Act to ratify, and confirm the validity of, the renewal of certain mining leases; to amend the Mining Act 1978; and for related purposes.
Acts Amendment (Trustee Companies) Act 1986	No. 19 of 1986	25 July 1986
An Act to amend the West Australian Trustees Limited Act 1893 (Note: West Australian Trustee Executor and Agency Company Limited Act 1893 (56 Vict. Private)) and the Perpetual Trustees W.A. Ltd., Act 1922. (Note: Perpetual Executors, Trustees, and Agency Company (W.A.) Limited Act 1922 (Private Act of 1923))
Perth Mint Amendment Act 1986	No. 39 of 1986	1 August 1986
An Act to amend the Perth Mint Act 1970 (Note: Perth Mint Act 1970 (No. 23)) and for related purposes.
State Government Insurance Commission Act 1986 or the Insurance Commission of Western Australia Act 1986	No. 51 of 1986	5 August 1986
An Act to establish the State Government Insurance Commission and the State Government Insurance Corporation, to provide for the constitution, functions and powers of those bodies, to repeal the State Government Insurance Office Act 1938, (Note: State Government Insurance Office Act 1938 (No. 39)) to amend certain other Acts, and for related purposes.
Environmental Protection Act 1986	No. 87 of 1986	10 December 1986
An Act to provide for an Environmental Protection Authority, for the prevention, control and abatement of environmental pollution, for the conservation, preservation, protection, enhancement and management of the environment and for matters incidental to or connected with the foregoing.
Western Australian Institute of Technology Amendment Act 1986	No. 96 of 1986	10 December 1986
An Act to amend the Western Australian Institute of Technology Act 1966 (Note: Western Australian Institute of Technology Act 1966 (No. 94)) and the Acts Amendment (Student Guilds and Associations) Act 1983. (Note: Acts Amendment (Student Guilds and Associations) Act 1983 (No. 51))
	No. X of 1986	
Loan Act 1986	No. 109 of 1986	16 December 1986
An Act to authorize the borrowing of a sum of two hundred and sixty million dollars for public purposes and to reappropriate for public purposes certain sums previously appropriated.

== Sources ==
- "legislation.wa.gov.au".
