= SGIC (disambiguation) =

SGIC may refer to:

- SGIC, formerly State Government Insurance Commission, a South Australian insurance company
- Seoul Guarantee Insurance Company, a Korean trade insurance company
- SGIC, former stock symbol for Silicon Graphics
