= Royal Automobile Club of Australia =

National motoring club in Australia

Coordinates: 33.8618°S 151.2128°E

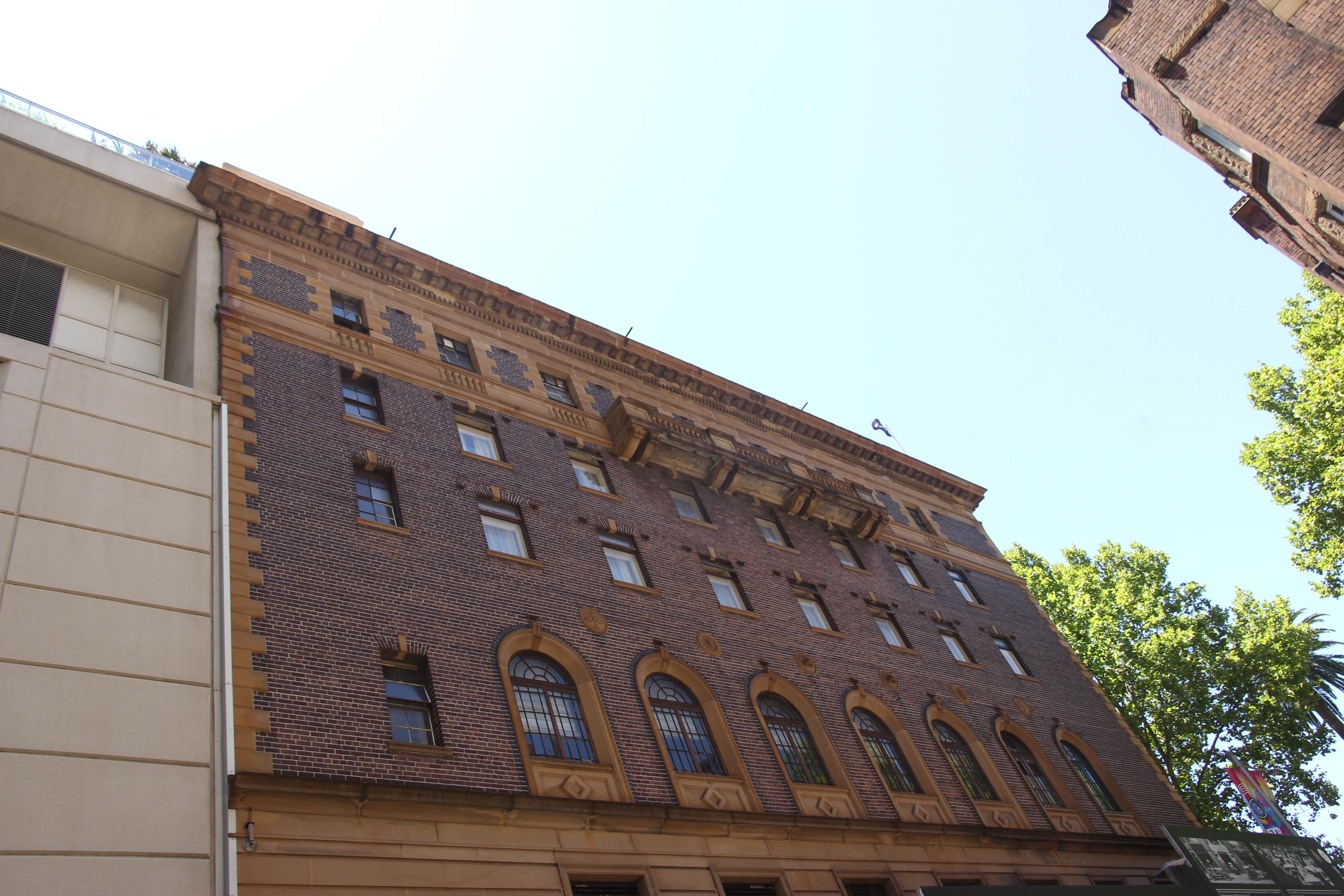
- Formation: 1903
- Type: Business, Social and Special Interest
- Headquarters: 89 Macquarie St, Sydney, Australia
- Location: New South Wales, Australia
- President: David Moloney, President
- Key people: Douglas Grand, CEO
- Website: www.raca.com.au

The Royal Automobile Club of Australia (RACA) is an Australian motoring organisation, which has also incorporated the Australian Imperial Services Club since 1987.

The RACA was established in March 1903 in Sydney, and is the oldest motoring club in Australia, founded by Henry Alfred ‘Harrie’ Skinner, WE Fisher and HE Jones. The organisation also advocated for specific localised issues for motorists in Sydney. The Royal Automobile Club of Australia had an important role in shaping early motoring legislation, in safeguarding the rights of motorists, and in establishing motorsport in Australia.

In the 1920s and 1930s it was involved in organising hill climbing races, and similar events in New South Wales.

Most states of Australia have organisations named Royal Automobile Club with the state names added:Royal Automobile Club of Queensland, Royal Automobile Club of Tasmania, Royal Automobile Club of Victoria, Royal Automobile Club of Western Australia.

The organisation used to provide roadside service and insurance but in 1945 in an agreement with the NRMA ceased offering these services with members gaining reciprocal access to NRMA provided services. The RACA is a member of the Australian Automobile Association.

== History ==
=== Original office bearers ===
The first office bearers of the Royal Automobile Club of Australia (RACA), in 1903, were:

- President: HA Jones
- First Vice President: James Macken
- Second Vie President: Dr C McCarthy
- Third Vice President: Harrie Skinner
- Fourth Vice President: Harry Vale
- Hon Treasurer: George Lane
- Hon Secretary: WE Fisher
- Consulting Engineer: AJ Knowles

=== Past presidents ===
- HA Jones (1903–1908)
- S Horden Sr. (1908–1909)
- GF Todman (1909–1910)
- Sir Samuel Hordern, KBE (1910–1912, 1914–1930)
- Colonel JM Arnott (1912–1914)
- PA Oatley (1930–1936)
- WJ Bradley QC BA LLB (1936–1937)
- Sir John Butters, KB CMG MBE VD (1937–1949)
- H Scougall (1949–1956)
- HA Fisher-Webster BA (Oxon) (1956–1967)
- GW Cutts (1967–1970)
- AF Bode FCA (1970–1973)
- JO Sherwood MBE (1973–1982)
- BV Clifton (1982–1987)
- RG Wagland (1987–1992)
- BD Kelly (1992–1997)
- HE Nicholls (1997–1998)
- BJ Fisher (1998–2003)
- G. Thomas (2003–2016)
- M. Callanan (2016–2021)
- M. Lavender (2021–2022)
- R. Armitage (2023–2023)
- Dr P. Myers (2023–2024)
- David Moloney (2024–present)

== See also ==
- Motorsport in Australia
