= Henry Skinner (businessman) =

Australian businessman

Henry Alfred 'Harrie Skinner (July 12, 1854 – October 1936) was the founder of the Royal Automobile Club of Australia (RACA). He was a photographic pioneer and was a manager of a circus.

== Early life ==
Skinner was born in England on 12 July 1854. He came with his parents to Sydney around 1870, eventually settling in Melbourne. From there he found a bank job. At age 21, he decided to run off and join the circus. The circus he joined was called Cooper and Bailey's Great American International Circus.

== Career ==
In his 1936 obituary in The Truth, Harrie went on to run various sideshows, becoming a manager for Harrie Rickards. Harrie Skinner was the scheme behind several celebrities such as the US Minstrels, Ada Ward and Millie Walton and the Fakir of Oolu (actually an English magician called Sylvester, who performed Indian-style levitations). It is likely that Harrie introduced the gramophone to Sydney with a stage performance in mind – the first gramophones were pitted against live musicians in theatre.

He was in Sydney as early as 1878, when he took control of the Pier Hotel in Manly, and afterwards the Tivoli in Castlereagh Street and the Agincourt in George Street. For 11 years from 1882 he published Skinner's NSW Gazetteer, detailing timetables, postal and telegraph information according to the Evening News "replete with all information commonly found in such publications and much that is not". The Gazetteer was a success, but foundered when the Commissioners for Railways began publishing their own timetables "at about one fourth of the cost of production".

His theatrical management continued, with 27 years spent as the sole manager of the Palace Theatre, and some time as acting manager of the Tivoli. With the eye for spectacle, Harrie was the only businessman who agreed to back a foreign aviator who arrived in Sydney claiming he would build a machine that would flap its wings and fly. Harrie charged thousands of spectators to see the machine during its construction in a Castlereagh Street allotment, and interest reached high following a trial run with a donkey engine and the construction of a runway down one of the hills over Chowder Bay. Ferry boats kept a cautious distance below, with all the passengers paying the promoters for the privilege of their close-up view.

While the foreign aviator was keen to go ahead with the flight of his machine, Harrie had few illusions as to the likelihood of success and, fearing for the life of the pilot, arranged for the chocks holding the machine to be deliberately kicked out. The machine rolled down the hill without a pilot, hitting the water with a great splash and sinking like a stone. The machine's builder was distraught, despite his share of the takings, and stories were placed in the newspapers about "ruffians from Woolloomooloo" sabotaging the flight.

== Founding of the Royal Automobile Club of Australia ==
Harrie Skinner's love of machines made him an enthusiast for the new automobiles arriving in Sydney, and he purchased his De Dion car from retail baron Mark Foy, who would later become another founding member of the Royal Automobile Club of Australia. The story of his founding of the club is detailed down below.

The following tale relates a trip taken with good friend William 'Billy' Elliott driving a new vehicle to Bulli one Saturday. "Mr Elliott worked on the car all Friday night and we set off about 9.30 in the morning, hoping to arrive at Bulli about lunch time," Mr Skinner later recalled. "Everything went well until we reached the turning to Helensburgh, via Brown's Hill, and the top Sandy Road via Bulli Pass. Here we discovered the petrol was running out too quickly. Additional supplies had been sent to Bulli by rail.

"At the top of Brown's Hill, Billy said, 'Here's where we save some petrol'. He shut off the supply and started to coast down the hill. After going about 20 yards the pace became a cracker.

"I said, 'What's up?' and Billy replied, 'The damned brakes won't work!' Next, he tried to put his gears in, but they stripped, and off we went on our mad race.

"Two tires burst, we jumped water-courses, and the scenery rushed past in whirling array. There were two cows on the road; one went up the hill and the other down.

"There was no fence in those days and few places where a cart could pass. Fortunately, we met none. At the bottom Billy drove sideways into an embankment. Four tires were burst and missing, the gears were gone and our nerves were not functioning well. Billy says we reached 150 miles an hour (241.4 kilometers per hour). My estimate was 500. With the assistance of three different horses, we reached our destination at 7.30 PM. Ultimately, one of the brakes was found in the back of the car."

In the early days when horseless carriages were still drawing crowds of onlookers wherever they went, the difficulty was finding a place to stop the car. One day Harrie Skinner took his wife for a drive to La Perouse. On arriving, a tire was flat, and he proceeded to pump the tyre up, surrounded by an audience of hundreds, according to a story printed in The Motor in 1927, Mrs Skinner objected to this publicity, and threatened never to get into the car again. To please her, Skinner drove into the bush away from prying eyes, and continued working on the car. While he was busy, three young fellows drove up in a horse-drawn cart, and sensed that something was wrong.

"Can we gi' yer a hand?"

"No, thanks," replied Mr Skinner.

"Gi' yer a pull?"

"No."

"Well, can we take yer tart?"

== Driving examiner ==
As car numbers began to increase on New South Wales roads, and public safety became an issue for police, the authorities, who had already worked in close association with the club on motoring issues, approached it to provide an experienced driver to undertake the examination of drivers for licences. Harrie was nominated as the member "with the most time on his hands" — a surprising statement given his level of activity. He was authorised to examine drivers and issue certificates.

Harrie Skinner's work for the RACA and his founding role earned him the honour of the first Honorary Life Membership of what was by then the Royal Automobile Club of Australia. A year before his death in 1936, an honorary portrait of him was unveiled at a special presentation at the RACA's Club House in Macquarie Street, where it remains on display.

== Death ==
Skinner died in October 1936 presumably at the age of 81. His body was buried in Waverley Cemetery, with his self-penned epitaph on his headstone:

"Life is Done, Time Ends, Eternity's Begun".

"Life was a funny proposition after all."
