= NRMA Insurance =

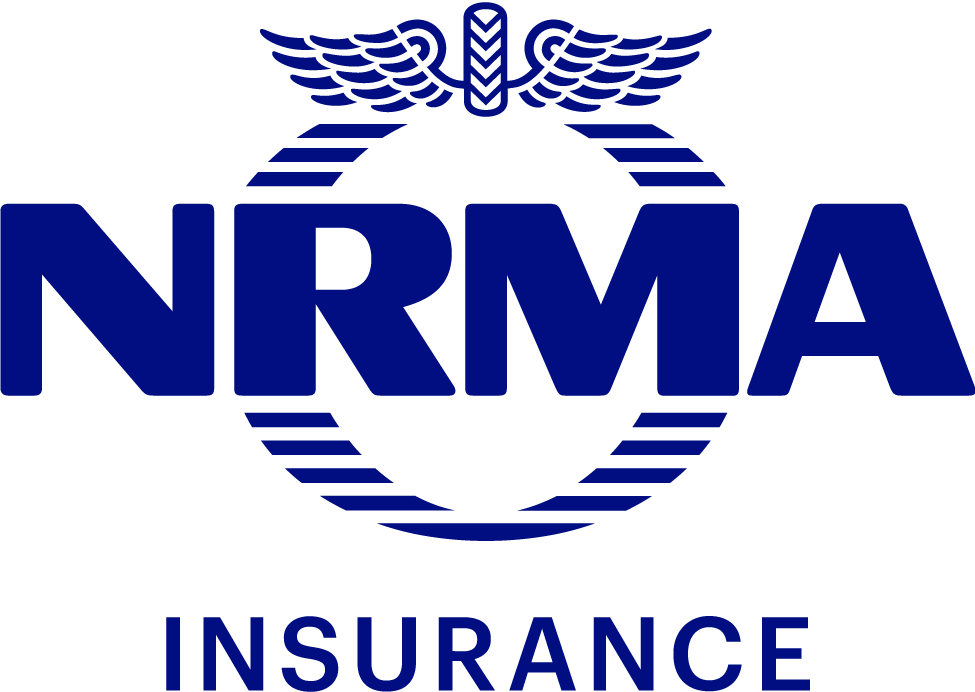
- Type: Brand
- Industry: General insurance
- Founded: 1925
- Founder: NRMA
- Area served: Australia
- Key people: Julie Batch (CEO)
- Products: Motor insurance, home insurance
- Parent: Insurance Australia Group
- Website: nrma.com.au

NRMA Insurance is an Australian general insurance brand. Founded by the NRMA in 1925, it is now owned by the Insurance Australia Group.

== History ==
NRMA Insurance was founded in 1925 as the insurance arm of the NRMA in New South Wales, Australia. Initially created to protect early motorists, it later expanded into home insurance.

In 2000, the insurance arm demutualised and was listed on the Australian Securities Exchange as NRMA Insurance Group Limited. In the same year, NRMA acquired SGIC from the SGIO of Western Australia. In 2002, the listed entity was renamed Insurance Australia Group (IAG), with NRMA Insurance continuing as a retail brand within the group.

NRMA insured homes during the 2019-20 Black Summer bushfires and produced the documentary A Fire Inside in 2021 about the fires.

In the early 2020s, NRMA pursued national expansion and brand consolidation. In November 2021, it launched motor, home, and business products in South Australia and Western Australia. In 2022, SGIC compulsory third-party insurance in South Australia was renamed to NRMA, and SGIO home and motor customers in Western Australia were transitioned to NRMA Insurance policies.

== Operations ==
NRMA operates primarily as a direct-to-consumer insurer focused on personal lines. It is IAG's principal retail brand for motor and home insurance.

== Former brand names ==
=== SGIC ===
State Government Insurance Commission (SGIC) first opened its doors for business on 4 January 1972 with a staff of 24 housed in the third level of Adelaide House at 55 Waymouth Street, Adelaide. When the Bill to establish SGIC was introduced into the South Australian Parliament, Premier Don Dunstan declared that SGIC's role was to help keep premiums at reasonable levels, ensure by competition that adequate service was given and make funds available for investment in semi governmental loans important to the development of the State. The first premium income for SGIC came from insuring the motor vehicle fleet of the Government of South Australia for $155,026.

SGIC moved to new premises on 24 April 1981 to 211 Victoria Square, Adelaide.

SGIC grew from a concept in 1971 to become the largest general insurer in South Australia by 1992 selling motor, home, life, commercial and health insurance throughout the state via 19 branches. By 1992 one in four South Australians was a client of SGIC and it employed close to 1,000.

In the latter half of the 1998, the SGIC was acquired by SGIO of Western Australia. In 2000 SGIO was acquired by the NRMA who in turn acquired CGU. SGIC and CGU moved to new building at 80 Flinders Street in 2005.

== Awards and recognition ==
In January 2024, Brand Finance ranked NRMA Insurance as Australia's second-strongest brand, with a valuation of approximately AU$2 billion.
