= NRMA =

Australian organisation

- National Roads and Motorists' Association Limited
- Formation: 1920
- Type: Mutual company limited by guarantee.
- Tax ID no.: (ABN) 77 000 010 506
- Headquarters: Sydney Olympic Park, New South Wales, Australia
- Members: 3.5 million (2025)
- Key people: Derek Stanwell (Chairman); Mike Baird (CEO)
- Revenue: $1 billion (2025)
- Website: mynrma.com.au

The NRMA (trading name of National Roads and Motorists' Association) is an Australian organisation offering roadside assistance, car batteries, advocacy for motorists and road-users, motoring advice, International Driving Permits, travel accommodation, member benefits, car hire, and marine commuter services in all of Australia. It is a member-owned mutual company limited by guarantee. It was formed in 1920.

Prior to 2000, the organisation offered mutual insurance but that part of the business was demutualised and spun out as NRMA Insurance, which is now part of Insurance Australia Group. The NRMA and NRMA Insurance are independent companies with an agreement to use the same brand name even though each company is responsible for distinguishing the difference between the two organisations.

== History ==
=== Early history ===
==== National Roads Association ====
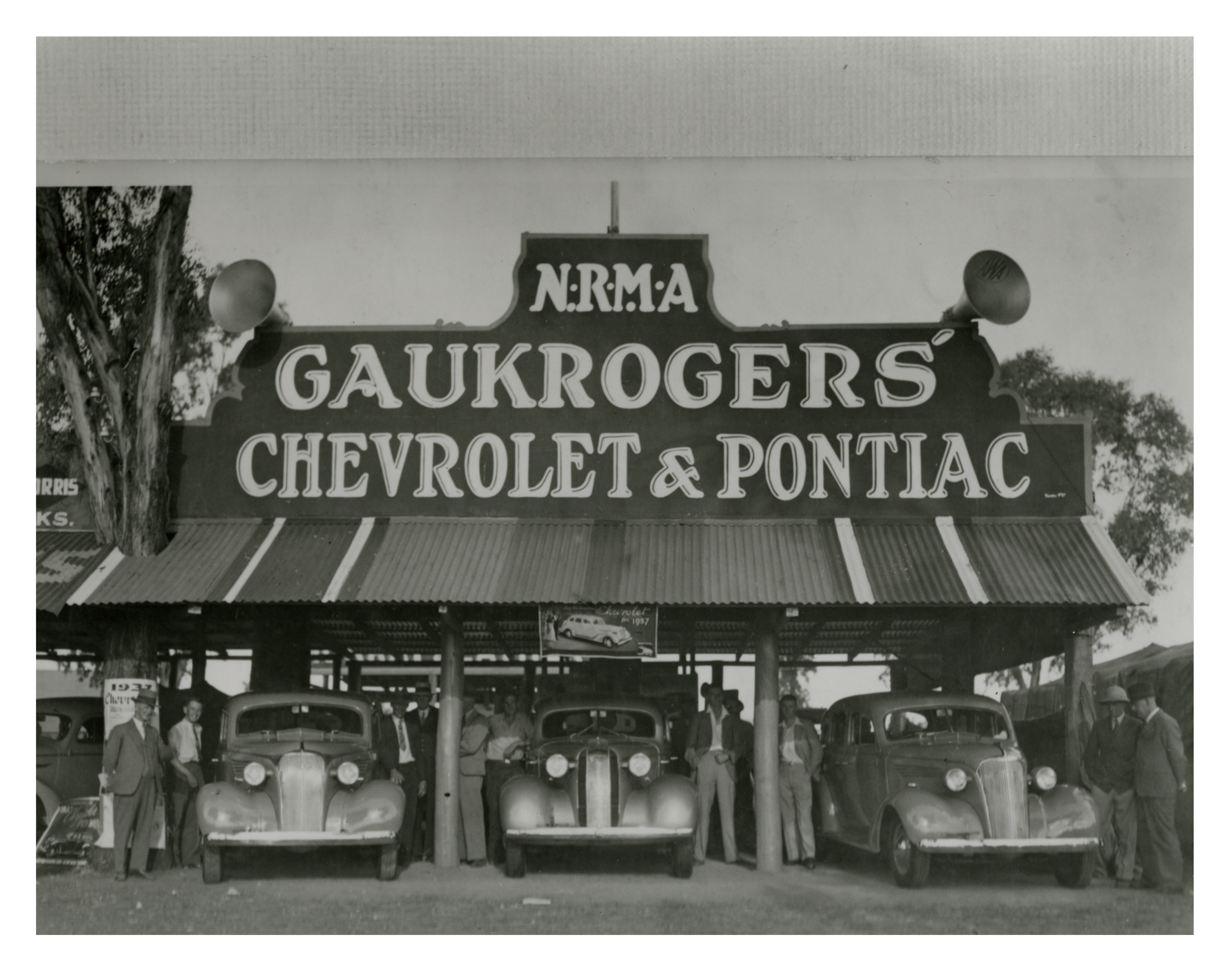
NRMA-endorsed new car dealer in Tumut, from a 2005 exhibition.

The Australian National Roads Association, which would become the NRMA, was launched in 1920. Its original aim was not to provide road service or insurance, but to obtain "reasonable and just legislation" to fund and improve roads.

The early 1900s brought the arrival of motorised road transport and car and truck use were gaining popularity. The government was placed under pressure to improve roads as competition increased with railways. The 1919 Local Government Act left all decisions to local councils, where decisions were made "from the point of view of the local utility."

The 1950s heralded the beginning of a huge surge in the number of cars on Australian roads, and NRMA membership increased in kind. It hit one million members in the 1970s, and by the late 1980s, that number had doubled.

==== Role of the RACA ====
The Royal Automobile Club of Australia (RACA) had been campaigning for better roads since its creation. The club had initiated a Good Roads Association in 1912.

The National Roads Association aimed to become a broader and stronger pressure group with the same objectives as RACA, and it received full support from the latter. RACA's President, WJ McKinney, and DM Cooper, the chairman of RACA's Roads and Tours committee, were among the provisional committee members when the Association was formally established on 4 February 1920.

==== Creation of NRMA and continued RACA involvement ====
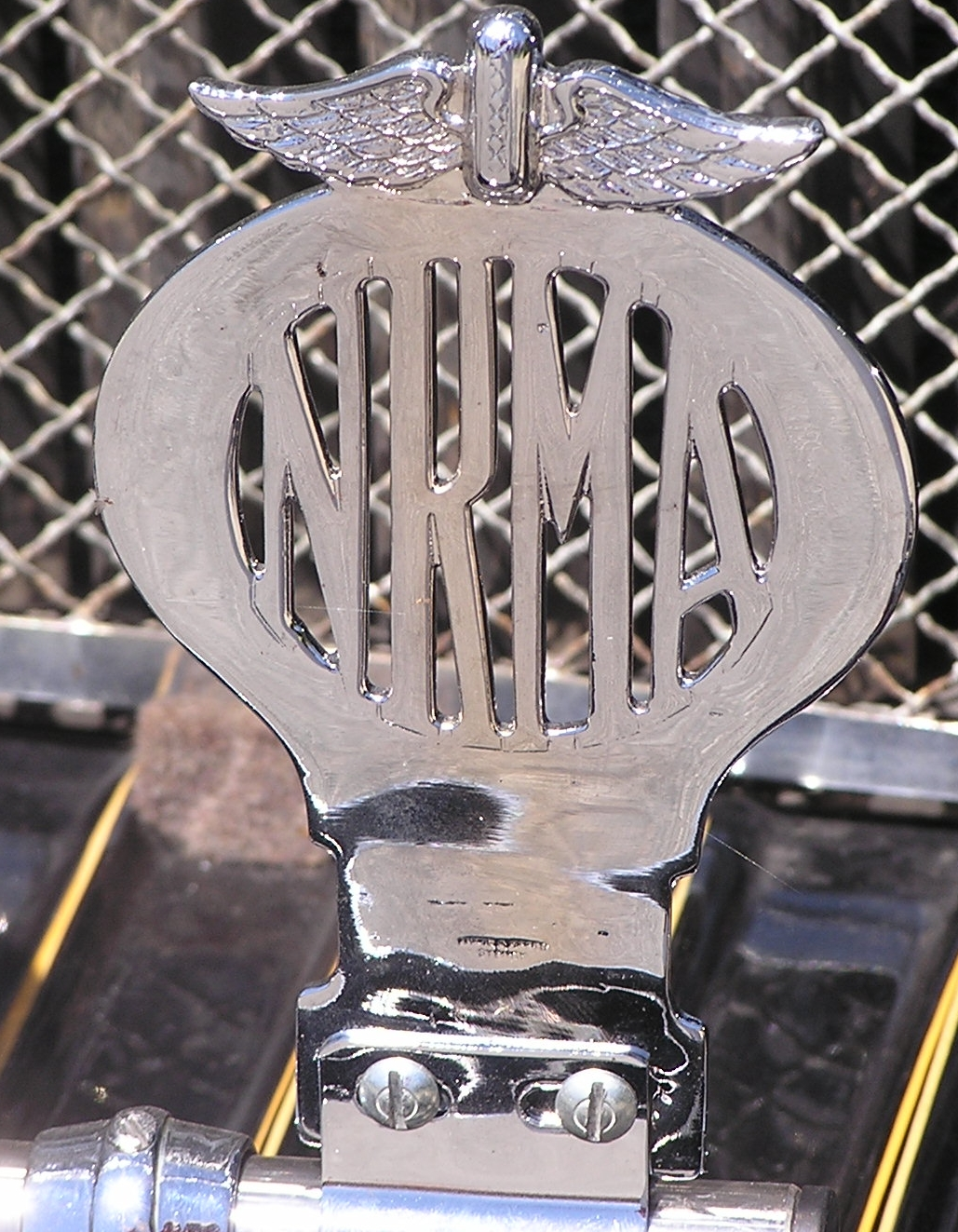
NRMA hood ornament on a 1930s Rolls-Royce Phantom

Former prime minister Chris Watson became NRA president in 1920 and served until his death in 1941. The National Roads Association was restructured as the National Roads and Motorists' Association at the beginning of 1924. With a goal strikingly similar to that of RACA, it positioned the NRMA as a competitor as much as a collaborator, particularly when it began to employ its own road service "guides". These returned servicemen "of exemplary character" patrolled specific areas, including the popular beaches of Coogee, Bondi Beach and Bronte, or were based at congested spots on the roads out of the city where they could receive messages by phone or relayed by other motorists.

The NRMA attended a 1925 meeting convened by RACA on traffic regulations. Together with other motoring lobby groups, they resolved to draft suggested reforms. Particular concerns included the need for a special traffic court, and a change to the "plethora of danger signs" that had appeared in the streets, accompanied by "frequently incomprehensible signals of police" at intersections. As an alternative to the red triangle placed by police at danger spots.

==== Launch of NRMA Insurance ====
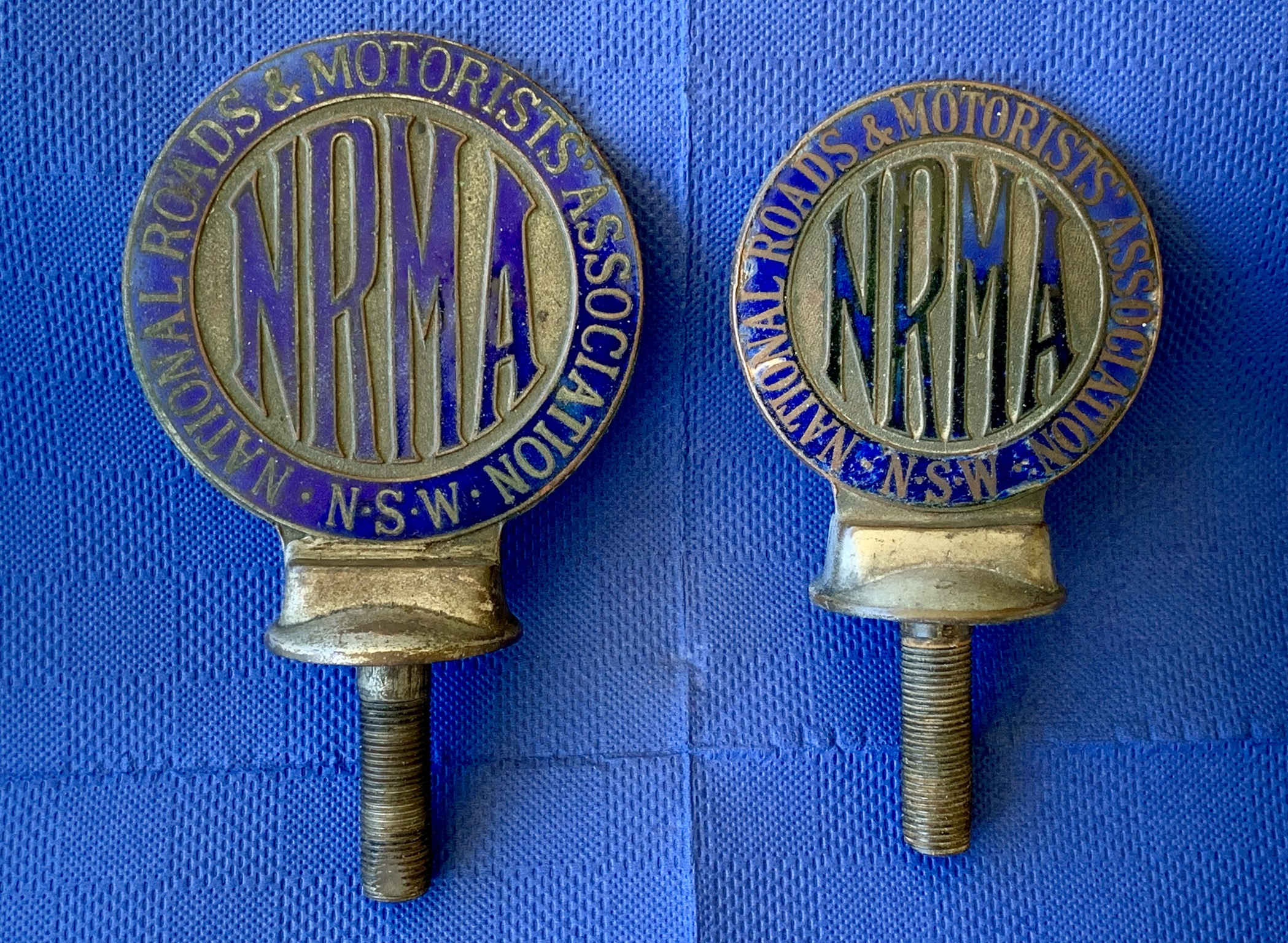
NRMA badges

By 1925, NRMA had 7,637 members, nearly double the previous year's. In that year NRMA formed NRMA Insurance, which also became a sub-agency of Lloyd's of London, and offered new household policies in addition to motoring insurance.

NRMA Insurance is now Australia-wide with the exception of Victoria.

==== The NRMA ====
The NRMA is a member-owned mutual organisation. In 2024, NRMA provided roadside assistance to over 2.8 million members in NSW. Outside NSW, service to NRMA members from NSW is provided by other state-based motoring clubs such as RACV, RACQ and RAA. Likewise, when members from other states visit NSW, the NRMA provides roadside assistance to them.

Other motoring services provided by the NRMA include mobile car battery replacement, driver training, vehicle inspections, International Driving Permits and car advice

As part of the NRMA, there’s a benefits program My NRMA Rewards which provides a range of discounts exclusive to members on a variety of goods and services. These include everyday items such as groceries and fuel, as well as discretionary purchases like fashion, movie tickets, experiences and accommodation.

==== Relationship with RACA ====
When World War II began, it followed the RACA's early lead in forming the NRMA Transport Auxiliary. This force of 500 drivers would provide rapid troop transport if required. Staff member, Miss K. Broadbent, organised a Women's Auxiliary Transport Corps which trained 506 women to drive more complex vehicles such as trucks, ambulances and motorcycles.

At the end of the war, RACA made the decision to cease its road service operations. The NRMA's growth had made its competing operations considerably wider in scope and reach. RACA's members were served by an agreement with the NRMA whereby RACA membership included entitlement to full NRMA services.

==== Demutualisation ====
NRMA Insurances' financial success had led to a huge accumulation of surplus funds which could not be distributed back to members and was attractive to outside interests. Insurance premium rebates to members had the effect of artificially and harmfully deflating the price of NRMA's insurance products.

After years of discussion and acrimony, NRMA Insurance Limited was demutualised in August 2000 and was separated from the National Roads and Motorists' Association Limited. NRMA Insurance Limited later changed its name to Insurance Australia Group.

By 1994 "Road service and lobbying for the interests of the vehicle owner" were long departed from the profit ledgers of the NRMA.

==== Separate paths ====
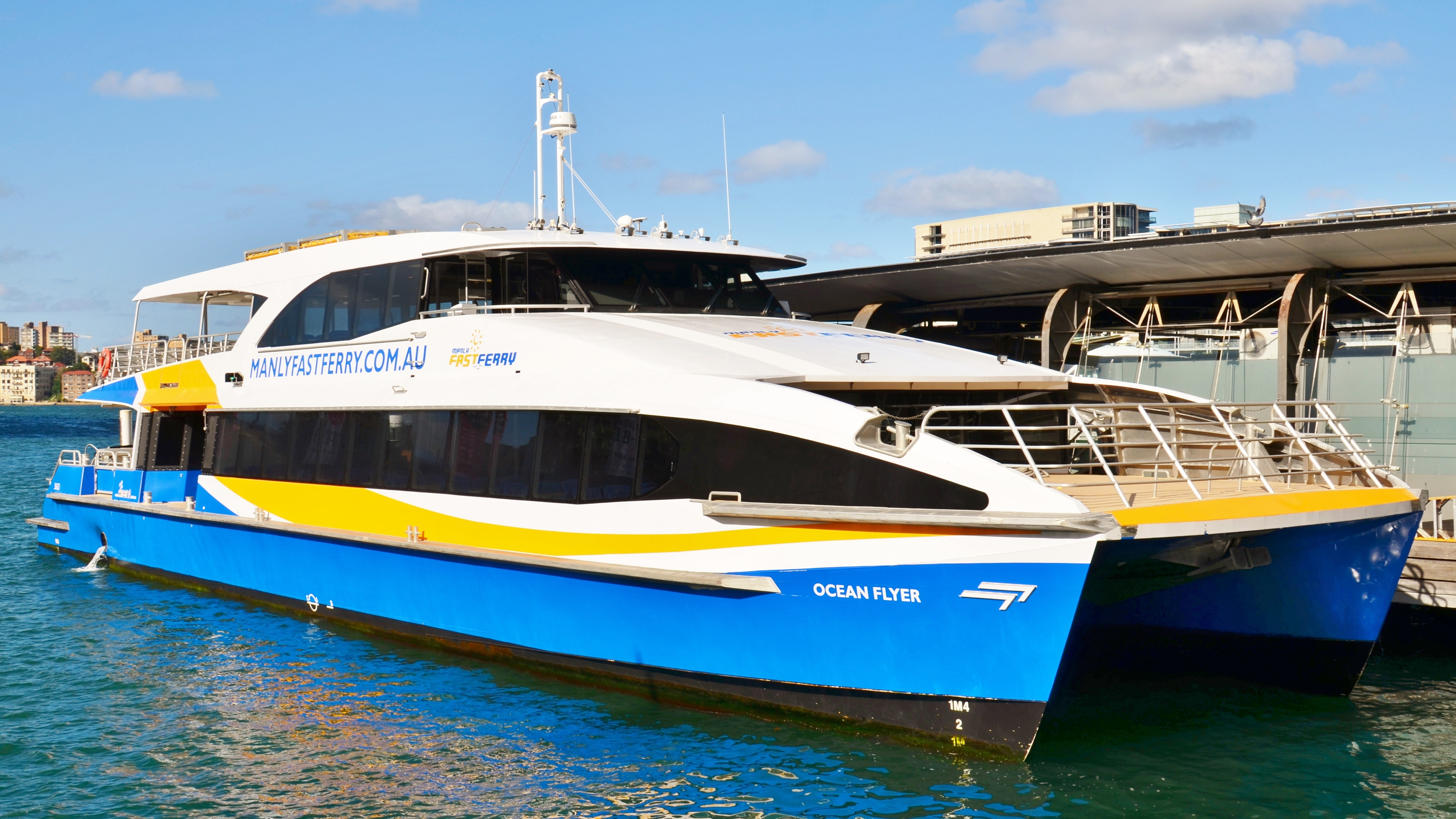
Manly Fast Ferry

NRMA remains a mutual company owned by its members. Insurance Australia Group is a listed company owned by its shareholders. It has a number of operating subsidiaries using the NRMA brand, including NRMA Insurance Limited, as well as a number of other insurance and related brands.

During 2004 and 2005, the NRMA, in a joint venture agreement with JF Meridian Trust, acquired the Travelodge Australia chain of hotels in Australia. This was sold in 2021.

In September 2006, the NRMA purchased a 75% shareholding in the Australian Thrifty Car Rental franchise from Mitsubishi Motors Australia. The deal was highlighted in the media and in NSW Parliament as potentially involving conflict of interest with the board member Gary Punch. In December 2008, the NRMA acquired the remaining 25% shareholding in Thrifty. In 2021 the Thrifty franchise was relinquished and the NRMA became a Sixt franchisee.

It has also continued to grow its travel and holiday operations by investing in tourist parks, and in January 2007, acquired a major stake in the travel wholesaler Adventure World.. The organisation has since expanded its accommodation portfolio significantly and, as of September 2026, operates 50 properties across Australia under the NRMA Parks & Resorts brand, including holiday parks, resorts, campgrounds and nature-based accommodation experiences. In March 2021, it was announced that the NRMA had purchased the Tasmanian tourism assets of the Royal Automobile Club of Tasmania (RACT) including Cradle Mountain Hotel, Freycinet Lodge, Gordon River Cruises and Strahan Village to be operated under the NRMA Expeditions brand. In November 2022, the NRMA acquired Pumphouse Point, located in the Cradle Mountain-Lake St Clair National Park, to also be operated under the NRMA Expeditions brand in Tasmania.

In 2017 the NRMA purchased Manly Fast Ferry.

==== EV ====
In 2012 the NRMA opened free public charging stations for electric vehicles in Sydney (fast charger) and Canberra. They also undertook electric vehicle roadshows to help raise awareness, and also trialled one of the first electric vehicles as roadside assistance vehicles.

==== Criticism ====
In 2008 the NRMA was criticised for its anti-cycleway stance. Lord Mayor of Sydney, Clover Moore, said the NRMA, like big petroleum companies, has a vested interest in campaigning for car use. Greens MP Lee Rhiannon said the NRMA has an anti-cycleway agenda. Said Rhiannon: "The NRMA's anti-cycleway campaign is a crude attempt to boost money for road building. It's time the NRMA leadership came into the 21st century and recognised that encouraging more cyclists is an easy way to reduce road congestion." Rhiannon accused the NRMA of using misleading statistics in its campaign.

== Policy positions ==
Advocacy for the interests of motorists is the foundation activity of the NRMA. The NRMA "contributes to parliamentary and government processes in a number of ways" and is frequently quoted in the media. In 2019 the NRMA said cars need to be given priority in Canberra's urban planning.

The NRMA has collaborated with Business Sydney and Business Western Sydney on policy reports and submissions.

In 2011, the NRMA stated "building more roads to expand capacity" would "not ‘solve’ congestion anyway in the longer term" (due to induced demand).

A 2022 Sydney Morning Herald editorial described the NRMA as "the motorists' lobby". The NRMA has been described by advocacy groups as "a particularly influential car lobby" and was included in an article titled "Does the Australian car lobby have bikes in its election platform?".

The NRMA publishes it's policy positions publicly.

=== Congestion Charging ===
In 2013, in a discussion of Road User Charging in a NSW Parliament submission, the NRMA stated it "strongly believes that motorists already pay enough for travel". It claimed similar results can be achieved by "encouraging people" to travel at different times. It advocated that "No congestion tax be imposed on motorists to fund road infrastructure". The NRMA claimed the "current backlog" of NSW road infrastructure was $115 billion and recommended traditional government financing as the "first option" to fund road projects.

In 2021 the NRMA stated it "supports the availability of all funding models to maximise investment in road and transport infrastructure".

In 2022, after a confidential report was released suggesting a congestion tax for Sydney, the NRMA said the plan would discourage people travelling into the CBD and suggested "maybe this is not the best idea".

=== Safer urban speed limits ===
The NRMA supports "30km/h zones in ultra-high risk areas" on a case-by-case basis.

The NRMA does not support "arbitrary" changes to speed limits or speed zones. It opposed the introduction of 40km/h speed limits in Canberra and in Sydney, which resulted in statistically significant reductions in crashes.

In 2019 the NRMA rejected proposals to lower speed limits to reduce road deaths because "what we see is the speed limit is cut, the speed cameras follow, then comes the fine, then comes the community frustration.", and that "sensible policies" that "enables people to get to where they’re going" are required. Such comments were made on ABC News 7:30 in response to a University of New South Wales study proposing speed limit reductions to 40km/h in high pedestrian active areas (and preferably 30 km/h).

The NRMA stated a 2022 proposal for 30km/h zones on neighbourhood roads and local centres "does not work", claiming "You've got to use science and data and research and history when you are setting speed limits". Amid a 10.2% year-on-year increase in road deaths, in 2024 more than 100 of Australia’s top transport and urban researchers signed an open letter calling for lower speed limits on local streets.

The NRMA requested that motorists were "placed at the centre" of the Roads Act 2013 Review. Under the Road Safety section in an options submission, the NRMA urged congestion levels be taken into account when speed reductions are considered, among other factors.

=== Pedestrians ===
The NRMA jointly funded the incorporation of the Pedestrian Council of Australia in 1996 with the Roads & Traffic Authority.

To stop the rise in pedestrian fatalities, the NRMA advocates for the "need to educate people about the dangers of distracted walking" as well as safe vehicles and safe infrastructure.

The NRMA has campaigned against "distracted walking" and "drunk walking". In their 2019 "Look Up - Keeping Pedestrians Safe" report, the top 3 recommendations of the NRMA's were "more data to quantify the role of distracted walking" in crashes involving pedestrians, education campaigns to underline the dangers of distracted walking, and improving awareness among venues servicing alcohol (and their customers) "about the dangers of drunk walking". The report recommended "Installation of overpasses and underpasses" and the installation of pedestrian fencing. It also claimed it is not safe for vehicles to be required to give way to pedestrians at traffic signals, and that pedestrians need protection from turning vehicles at intersections.

=== Cyclists ===
In 2008 the NRMA accused the government of wasting millions of dollars building cycleways.

In 2010, the NRMA was concerned crashes involving cyclists on motorways typically result in deaths or serious injuries, and proposed raised profile edge line and buffer strips to comply with NSW Bike Plan Action Item 3.13.

In 2026 the NRMA stated that "illegal e-bikes to be outlawed on all public roads".

The NRMA supports increasing enforcement and police powers, including potential confiscation of e-bikes for illegal use.

In 2026 the NRMA "spearheaded" a campaign to "introduce registration and identification requirements for e-bikes" and "calls for set of reforms around e-bike use". The NRMA claims e-bike use is currently largely unregulated.

An NRMA spokesperson said "What we need to do is find a way to get these kids off these bikes. And absolutely get these kids off our roads while they’re riding these bikes."

=== Car Parking ===
In 2025 the NRMA published a report (a combined project of Business Sydney, Business Western Sydney and the NRMA) studying parking costs. The report claimed that "Sydney is being held back by expensive and hard-to-find parking."

The report recommended to cap parking fees, start a Western Sydney parking inquiry, and implement a state-wide parking app. It suggested correction of "policy misalignment" as "Current parking pricing strategies may be outdated for the Sydney CBD", claiming high fees were no longer needed to drive modal shift.

=== Speed cameras and school zones ===
The NRMA supports the use of speed cameras to assist enforcement.

Each January, the NRMA calls for an audit into NSW school zones and speed cameras.

In January 2026, the NRMA called for an audit into NSW school zones after a record number of speeding and red-light camera offences were recorded.

In January 2025, the NRMA called for an audit. In February 2025, the NRMA stated "it's unacceptable to simply install a speed camera in a school zone and say the job is done."

In January 2024, the NRMA called on the Chris Minns Government to conduct an immediate audit of speed cameras in school zones.The NRMA called for an audit ahead of school zones (conditional speed limits) returning.

In January 2023, an NRMA spokesperson called for an audit of all schools in the state to "better manage how drivers pass through vulnerable zones, and how high traffic times such as pick-up and drop-off could be better managed".

== Publication ==
NRMA launched The Open Road to inform its members about its activities, including campaigning governments for improved roads, road safety and information about motoring. It was launched in 1921 under the name Good Roads and was renamed The Open Road in 1927.

== See also ==
- Membership campground
