= AMP Business =

- Starring: Nadine Chalmers-Ross
- Country of origin: New Zealand

Production
- Running time: 30 Minutes

Original release
- Network: TV One
- Release: 11 August 1997

AMP Business was an early morning business program hosted by Nadine Chalmers-Ross airing on TV One in New Zealand. The show was followed by Breakfast. It was cancelled in 2011 after AMP withdrew their sponsorship.

From 1997 to 2007 the programme was hosted and co-produced by Michael Wilson. During this time it was called Telstra Business, TelstraSaturn Business, TelstraClear Business, Business and ASB Business. Wilson went to TV3 in October 2007. ASB Business was cancelled in 2010. The show was called Breakfast Business until NZI gave their name to the relaunched show. In 2011, the show was sponsored by AMP and was called AMP Business. After cancellation, it was subsumed into Breakfast.
