= Imperial Service Club =

The Imperial Services Club was a club for Australian military officers returning from war service.

The club was incorporated into the Royal Automobile Club of Australia (RACA) in 1986, bringing with it a history stretching back to World War I.

== History ==
The ISC's first premises were in Penzance Chambers at 29 Elizabeth Street, Sydney. These were secured and furnished at the end of 1917 by a committee of returned officers who "felt the need and realised the national value of such an institution". The first ideas for this institution may have emerged from the Oxford Hotel at the corner of King and Phillip Streets, a regular meeting house for the Royal New South Wales Lancers.

An early Club document proclaimed, "It is scarcely possible to emphasise too strongly the necessity for such a Club as this, which will be a rallying point for the Officers who have served and will bind them into one strong united body, which they certainly were on service". The objects of the Club were stated as:

1. Social;
2. Preserve the Friendships formed on Service;
3. Maintain the Patriotic Spirit which made the AIF.

According to a fund-raising document issued in 1919, the qualifications for ISC membership were “Commissioned rank in HM Naval or Military Forces, and Active Service in a War of the Empire”. It was also intended to later admit those officers who were not of military age during the First World War, “including graduates of Duntroon Military and Jervis Bay Naval Colleges”.

The second floor of the Elizabeth Street building was fitted out to include a Smoking and Reading Room, a Billiards Room with one table, Dining and Card Rooms, and a Lounge. A dormitory and servants’ quarters were provided on the fifth floor.

=== Phillip Street ===
Soon after the Club was opened it became apparent that the Elizabeth Street premises were too small, and it was decided at a general meeting held at the end of 1918 to purchase a site and build new premises. By 1 September 1919, the Club had 900 members, and distinguished visitors to the Club had included the Governor-General Sir Ronald Ferguson, the State Governor Sir Walter Davidson, and the Admiral of the Fleet Viscount Jellicoe.

The Committee purchased three buildings covering a 62 ft frontage at 140, 142 and 144 Phillip Street, and produced plans to remodel the front portion, obtaining a total of four floors and a basement for a total cost estimated, including purchase, at £36,000. Of this, it was necessary to raise £11,600 by direct appeal to the members. The Club President, Commander RS Lambton, sent out a letter describing the situation as "almost a matter of 'life or death' – 'club or no club'".

=== Barrack Street ===
The results of the appeal for funds are unrecorded, other than a list of donations including £2000 from the State government and £400 from the Australian Jockey Club. It is uncertain whether the Phillip Street premises were ever occupied. (If they were, it is an interesting coincidence that the ISC would have been a near neighbour of RACA, which occupied 132–134 Phillip Street at this time.) Certainly by the 1930s the Imperial Service Club was operating from what were to be long-held rooms in Barrack Street. One of Sydney's shortest streets, Barrack Street once formed the side gate of the George Street military barracks.

The Club was situated on several floors above Sydney's first Savings Bank, the Savings Bank of New South Wales, later the Government Savings Bank. Barrack Street itself survived potential demolition under Dr. Bradfield's plans to extend a 100 ft-wide Martin Place to York Street as part of Sydney's redesign in preparation for the new Harbour Bridge.

The Harbour Bridge provides another ISC connection; the de Groot incident is alleged to have been planned in the ISC's Barrack Street rooms, according to Sydney historian Shirley Fitzgerald. On 19 March 1932, Francis Edward de Groot, described by the Sydney Morning Herald as "an officer of the New Guard", rode past Premier Jack Lang and cut the ribbon on the Bridge, shouting "I declare this bridge open on behalf of the respectable citizens of New South Wales". He was arrested and charged with "being deemed to be insane" and released the next day. With Lang's nationalism anathema to the officer and commercial classes, current ISC members agree it likely that such an "officers' coup" could have originated in the city's primary meeting place for commissioned servicemen.

The Club became the venue of choice for Battalion reunions and annual dinners. Links were maintained with forces in action during the Second World War. In 1942, when the crucial role of the 2/17th Battalion in the Battle of El Alamein was learned, ISC members from the 1/17th sent a message of congratulations to their successors. This message was said to have "tickled them most of all".

=== York Street ===
The Imperial Service Club's next premises were in York Street. Facilities included a small gymnasium, a steam and sauna room, billiards tables, and public and private dining rooms. Characters still fondly remembered by members today included Betty the cashier, who "knew everyone and everything", and Rupert the waiter, who was kept on even when he "got the shakes" in later life. Celebrated regulars included Brigadier Sir F 'Black Jack' Galleghan, who had commanded AIF troops in Changi and later became deputy head of the Commonwealth Investigation Service (which evolved from the wartime Military Intelligence Bureau). He could be seen most lunchtimes in the "always full" dining room, enjoying his sandwich and cup of tea. Newly commissioned young officers would usually be invited to York Street by other officers for a celebratory drink.

The York Street premises proved the Club's downfall. A fixed rent had been negotiated, but a vital clause in the contract was overlooked, allowing the raising of rent to market rates after a fixed period. This came into effect in 1984/5, almost doubling the Club's rent.

In April 1985 the Sydney Morning Herald reported a proposal by the ISC to the Union Club in Bent Street regarding a merger. The article detailed the Club's declining membership accompanied by escalating average fees, from a high of 4145 members and average fees of $31 in 1974, to 1574 members and fees of $260 in 1985. "Each day brings us nearer to the inevitable liquidation", said ISC President Colonel Browne. The Club's problems were attributed to "declining membership, coupled with the effect of inflation, random breath testing and changing community attitudes towards clubs". It also noted the Club's reduction to only "dining facilities and a small bank of poker machines".

== Joining RACA ==
The Union Club merger was rejected the following week. RACA's then President, Basil Clifton, later recalled that the Union club had a problem because "at that time some nurses were members of the Imperial Club but the Union Club did not accept lady members. So the Imperial Club approached me and, after due discussion with the RACA Council, we decided that we would go ahead with a merger.”

The Imperial Service Club was incorporated within RACA in 1986. At RACA's annual general meeting of February 1987, a special resolution was passed that the name of the club be changed to Royal Automobile Club of Australia incorporating Imperial Service Club. The ISC was allowed to devolve its assets into RACA as a subsidiary company, ISC Holdings Pty Ltd. The voluntary liquidation of this company was begun in 1991, the first distribution of $1,700,000 being noted in the RACA President's Report of that year.

RACA's 100th year saw the opening of the newly refurbished ISC Lounge on the third floor of the Macquarie Street Clubhouse. From there the Imperial Service Club continues its activities.
