= IAG New Zealand =

Insurance company based in New Zealand

- Headquarters: Auckland, New Zealand
- Location: Auckland, New Zealand
- Key people: Phil Gibson (Chief Executive Officer)
- Parent organization: Insurance Australia Group
- Website: IAG New Zealand

IAG New Zealand (IAG NZ) is the New Zealand subsidiary of Insurance Australia Group. It is the largest general insurance company in New Zealand, just as its parent is the largest in Australia. It has a number of insurance brands it has acquired, including AMI Insurance, NZI and State Insurance. Its head office is in Auckland, New Zealand, and it has several offices throughout the country.

== Brands ==
In New Zealand, IAG NZ offers products under the following brands:

- AMI Insurance (formerly SIMU Insurance) – personal, business, farm and marine insurance
- DriveRight – breakdown insurance and extended vehicle warranties for motor dealers
- Mike Henry Travel Insurance – domestic and international travel insurance
- NAC Insurance – high-risk and short term vehicle insurance
- NZI (formerly New Zealand Insurance) – business, personal and rural insurance, exclusively though brokers
- State Insurance – home, contents, business, marine and vehicle insurance cover
- Swann Insurance (NZ) – classic car and motorbike insurance
- Lantern Insurance – brokerage exclusively selling NZI products
- Lumley Insurance – offered through intermediaries such as brokers and banks

Several New Zealand banks also resell IAG NZ insurance products.
