= Insurance Australia Group =

Insurance company in Australia

Insurance Australia Group Limited
- Type: Public
- Traded as: ASX: IAG; S&P/ASX 200 component
- Industry: Insurance
- Founded: 2000 (renamed from NRMA Insurance Group in 2002)
- Headquarters: Level 13, Tower Two, Darling Park; 201 Sussex Street; Sydney NSW 2000; Australia
- Area served: Australia; New Zealand; Thailand; Malaysia
- Key people: Tom Pockett (chair and independent non-executive director); Nick Hawkins (managing director and CEO, executive director)
- Products: General, commercial, vehicle, home and contents insurance
- Revenue: ▲ A$11.8 billion (2017)
- Net income: ▲ A$929 million (2017)
- Number of employees: 13,500+
- Subsidiaries: NRMA Insurance, CGU Insurance, SGIO, SGIC, Swann Insurance, NZI, AMI Insurance, NZI Thailand, Safety Insurance, AmAssurance, Lumley Insurance, Coles Insurance, WFI, ROLLiN' Insurance
- Website: iag.com.au

Insurance Australia Group Limited (IAG) is a multinational insurance company. It is the largest general insurance company in Australia, and also the largest in New Zealand through its subsidiary IAG New Zealand. IAG had its origins in the National Roads and Motorists' Association NRMA. It is headquartered in Sydney, Australia.

The NRMA Insurance business demutualised in July 2000, separating from NRMA, with an issue of shares to NRMA members. NRMA Insurance Group Limited changed its name to Insurance Australia Group Limited on 15 January 2002, according to its website. IAG is an umbrella organization with numerous well known insurance brands it has acquired. The name IAG is not itself a customer-facing brand.

IAG is listed on the Australian Securities Exchange and is a constituent of the S&P/ASX 50 index.

== Operations ==
Insurance Australia Group has operations in Australia and New Zealand and a presence in five countries in Asia. Its businesses and brands include:

=== Australia ===
- NRMA Insurance
- SGIO, acquired in 1998
- SGIC, acquired in 1998
- CGU Insurance, acquired in 2003
- Swann Insurance, acquired in 2003
- WFI, acquired in 2014
- MotorServe, acquired 2019
- ROLLiN' Insurance

IAG has a 70% shareholding in Insurance Manufacturers of Australia Pty Limited (the other 30% being held by RACV), which issues insurance under the RACV Insurance name that is sold by RACV in Victoria.

In 2014, IAG signed a ten-year agreement to distribute home and car policies for Coles Insurance.

=== New Zealand ===
- State Insurance, acquired in 2001
- NZI (New Zealand Insurance), acquired in 2003
- AMI Insurance, acquired in 2012
- Lumley, acquired in 2014
- Lantern Insurance
- Swann Insurance (New Zealand)

=== Asia ===
- Thailand - IAG held a 98.6% beneficial interest in Safety Insurance, based in Thailand, which trades under the Safety and NZI brands, until 2018 when it sold its holding to Tokio Marine.
- Malaysia - IAG owns 49% of the general insurance arm of Malaysian-based AmBank Group, AmGeneral Holdings Berhad, which trades under the AmAssurance and Kurnia brands
- Vietnam - IAG owned 63.17% of AAA Assurance Corporation until 2018, when it sold its holding to Tokio Marine.
- Indonesia - IAG owned 80% of PT Asuransi Parolamas until 2018, when it sold its holding to Tokio Marine.

== History ==
In 2004, there was speculation that IAG would merge with Australia's then largest insurer QBE Insurance, however IAG denied the merger. Speculation emerged and was denied again in 2006.

On 10 April 2008, QBE proposed a takeover, with each IAG share being exchanged for 0.135 QBE shares plus 50 cents cash (an effective value of $3.75 per IAG share at the time). This proposal was rejected by the IAG board the next day. QBE responded by increasing its proposal to 0.142 QBE shares plus 70 cents per IAG share. On 14 April 2008, IAG also rejected this proposal. On 16 May 2008, QBE increased its proposal to 0.145 QBE shares plus 90 cents per IAG share (an effective value of $4.60 per IAG share at the time). This was rejected by IAG four days later and on 21 May 2008 QBE confirmed talks had collapsed and withdrew its proposal.

Important items that were considered when QBE made its proposal: IAG's short tail personal insurance products are distributed in Victoria under the RACV brand, via a distribution relationship and underwriting joint venture with RACV Limited. These products are distributed by RACV and manufactured by Insurance Manufacturers of Australia Pty Limited (IMA), which is 70% owned by IAG and 30% by RACV. If one of IMA's shareholders were to experience a change of control, the other has a pre-emptive right to acquire that shareholder's interest in IMA at market value. The duration of the arrangements governing RACV's distribution of RACV-branded products in Victoria would be a relevant factor in determining this market value (as would the duration of the arrangements governing IMA's reinsurance of NRMA-branded products in NSW and the ACT).

On 16 December 2013 IAG announced that it had agreed to purchase Wesfarmers Insurance underwriting businesses. The acquisition comprised companies trading under the WFI and Lumley brands, as well as a ten-year distribution agreement with Coles.

In 2015, IAG share price has fallen 9% since it reported its interim result. The insurer's net profit for the six months to December fell 10% to $579m due to intensifying competition and a jump in natural disaster claims. Disaster claims of $421m exceeded the company's expectations by $71m, mainly on account of $165m in claims following Brisbane's November hail storm – the worst seen in 30 years.

IAG's New Zealand business delivered a 26% rise in gross written premiums, though entirely on account of adding Wesfarmers' NZ-based operations. The underlying profit margin increased from 14.2% to 15.9% due to a period of few natural disasters but the company is still feeling pain from the massive 2011 Canterbury earthquakes.

In June 2015, Berkshire Hathaway acquired a 3.7 percent stake in the group for a fee of around $388 million in a partnership aimed at reducing IAG's capital requirements.

== See also ==
- Insurance in Australia
