= Travelodge Australia =

Travelodge Hotels Australia
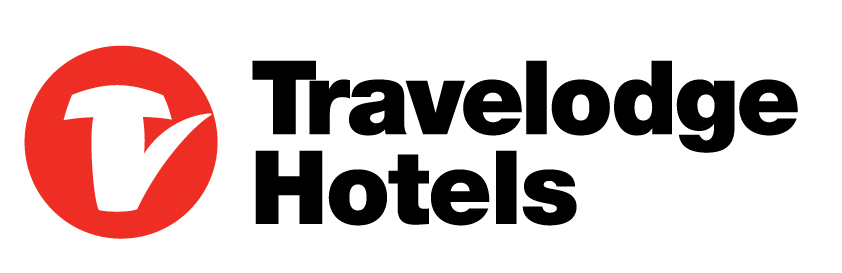
- Formerly: Southern Pacific Hotel Corporation
- Industry: Hospitality
- Headquarters: Sydney, Australia
- Number of locations: 18 (2018)
- Area served: Australia, New Zealand
- Key people: Antony Ritch (CEO)
- Number of employees: 491
- Parent: Salter Brothers
- Website: travelodge.com.au

Travelodge Hotels is an Australian-owned brand of hotels. As of February 2018, Travelodge has 18 hotels and 3,030 rooms across Australia and New Zealand.

Travelodge Hotels is under separate management to the Travelodge chains of the United Kingdom and United States.

== History ==
In 2005, the Toga Group entered into a long-term agreement to manage Travelodge Hotels in Australia and New Zealand.

In 2005, JF Meridian Trust expanded its operational and capital base by raising A$126.9 million, part of which would go to buy a half stake in the Travelodge Hotel chain with the joint deal involving NRMA as co-owner and the Toga Group as manager of the chain.

JF Meridian Trust was later absorbed into Mirvac, growing its initial 8 hotels to 13 properties.

In 2014, rights to the hotel brand in 22 markets throughout the Asia-Pacific region were acquired by Singaporean company ICP. This excluded Australia and New Zealand where Mirvac and NRMA retained brand rights.

The Toga Group has since formed a joint venture with Far East Hospitality to create TFE Hotels (Toga Far East Hotels), which operate the Adina Apartment Hotels, Medina Serviced Apartments, Rendezvous Hotels, Vibe Hotels, TFE Hotels Collection and Travelodge Hotels brands across Australia and New Zealand. In 2021, 11 hotels in the Travelodge Australia portfolio was purchased by Salter Brothers.

== Locations ==
Travelodge Hotels are located across the largest cities in Australia and New Zealand including Sydney, Melbourne, Brisbane, Perth, Newcastle, Darwin, Hobart and Wellington with 17 properties in total. The newest hotel is Travelodge Hotel Wynyard Quarter, Auckland, which will open in October 2020 followed by Travelodge Hotel Hurstville in 2021.
