= Thompson and Clark =

Thompson & Clark Investigations Ltd, known as Thompson and Clark or TCIL is a New Zealand private investigation agency founded in 2003 by principals Nicolas Guy 'Nick' Thompson and Gavin Shane Clark. The company has been involved in repeated scandals over spying on environmentalist and activist groups, often on behalf of government agencies and state-owned enterprises. In December 2018 after a scandal involving spying for government agencies the company was removed as a preferred supplier by the New Zealand Government.

== Company services ==
Thompson and Clark are former police officers and currently licensed private investigators and the company positions itself as being expert in 'issue motivated groups', a label it has applied to various environmental, animal rights, peace and other activist groups.

Thompson and Clark have a related business Risk Management Services which employs at least one former New Zealand Security Intelligence Service agent 'overseeing "covert surveillance"' Other related businesses include Cyclops Monitoring Limited, Eyela Limited and Omnes Videntes Limited which are all involved in security cameras and surveillance system monitoring.

== Controversies ==
=== 2006 - 2010 surveillance of activists ===
In April 2006 state-owned coal mining company Solid Energy admitted that it employed Thompson and Clark to spy on the Save Happy Valley Campaign, an environmental group. In May 2006 a second state-owned enterprise, Mighty River Power, also admitted using the company to spy on opponents of its proposal to revive the Marsden B power station. On 27 May 2007, The Sunday Star-Times reported that Thompson and Clark had recruited private individuals to infiltrate the Save Happy Valley Campaign, Wellington Animal Rights Network and Peace Action Wellington. In August 2007 it was revealed that AgResearch, the New Zealand Pork Industry Board, and Massey University were also employing Thompson and Clark to monitor activist groups, while the Ministry of Agriculture and Forestry refused to confirm or deny the practice.

Prime Minister Helen Clark said that "that behaviour is not acceptable from a state-owned enterprise", and the government instructed Solid Energy to stop. Despite this, in 2008 the company was again alleged to have attempted to employ another spy to obtain information from SHVC. Solid Energy refused to distance itself from the firm, claiming that they had no knowledge that Thompson and Clark would employ spies. They continued to employ Thompson and Clark, paying them $205,000 for "security advice" in 2012.

In August 2010 Thompson and Clark was again caught spying on activists, this time on animal rights campaigners.

=== 2018 surveillance scandal ===
In March 2018 allegations emerged that Southern Response, a government-owned company tasked with settling claims by AMI Insurance policy holders in the aftermath of the 2011 Christchurch earthquake, had improperly employed Thompson and Clark to investigate insurance claimants and an inquiry was launched by the State Services Commission. Later in March Official Information Act requests revealed that Thompson and Clark was spying on Greenpeace and other environmental groups on behalf of the Ministry of Business, Innovation and Employment. In April it was revealed that they had been employed by the Ministry of Foreign Affairs and Trade to provide security for the signing of the Trans-Pacific Partnership agreement in Auckland in 2016. In June 2018 the company was accused of unlawfully accessing activists' private information through NZTA's motor-vehicle register. Later that month details emerged of inappropriate dealings between at least one New Zealand Security Intelligence Service (SIS) staff member and Thompson and Clark. As a result the earlier inquiry was expanded to a whole-of-government inquiry, with MPI and SIS having launched their own internal investigations. The company agreed to cooperate with the inquiry.

The December 2018 report found evidence of Breaches of the Public Service Code of conduct by Crown-owned Southern Response, Ministry of Agriculture and Forestry, Ministry of Business, Innovation and Employment, New Zealand Security Intelligence Service, New Zealand Transport Agency, Crown Law and Ministry of Social Development in relation to the companies. Thompson and Clark released a press release saying that 'the report has also confirmed that much of the work we conducted for government agencies was within their SSC code of conduct and we are pleased the report has confirmed our view throughout that "there was no evidence of widespread surveillance by external security consultants on behalf of government agencies".'

As a result of the State Services Commission report the company was removed from the list of preferred suppliers to Government agencies. Three independent inquiries were conducted by the NZ Police, the Private Security Personnel Licensing Authority (PSPLA) and the Serious Fraud Office (SFO). All three inquiries found there had been no breach of the law or regulations.

=== 2021 surveillance for the exclusive brethren ===
In 2021, The New Zealand Herald reported that the seclusive Christian sect, Exclusive Brethren had hired the company to "spy on former members of the church". At least 20 ex-members, who are often critical of the church, have been monitored.

=== 2021 surveillance for the oil and gas industry ===
In April 2021 Radio New Zealand reported that Thompson and Clark had been hired by clients from the oil and gas industry to monitor and surveil a range of climate activist groups, including students involved in the School Strike 4 Climate movement. The company took actions against these groups including spreading misinformation about protests online, and providing the names of protest leaders to be given "retrospective trespass notices".
