= NZI =

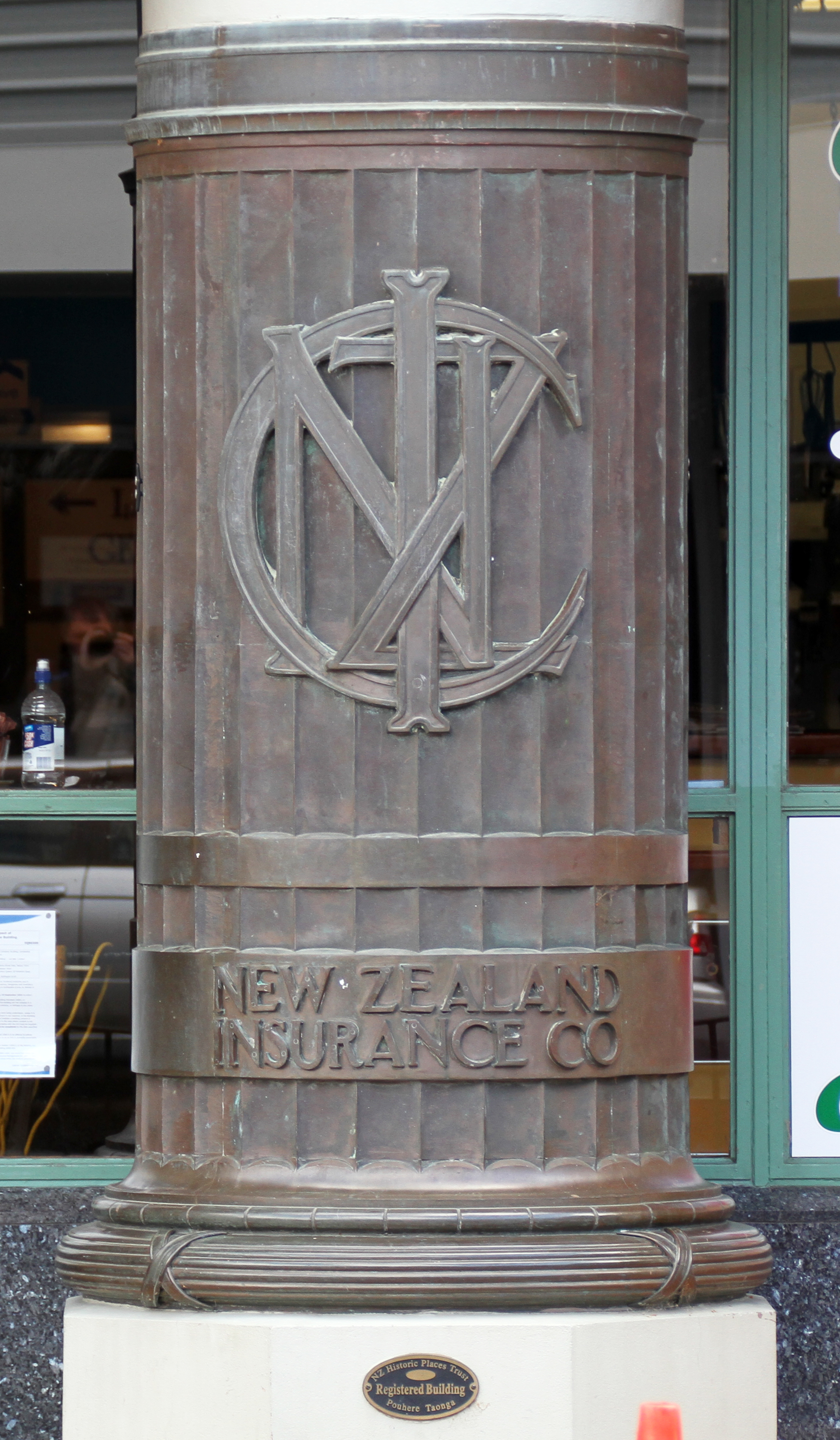
- Plaque on original New Zealand Insurance building in Nelson
- Company type: Subsidiary
- Industry: Insurance
- Predecessor: New Zealand Insurance Company
- Founded: 1856; 170 years ago
- Headquarters: Auckland, New Zealand
- Area served: New Zealand
- Products: Home insurance, car insurance, boat insurance, and commercial property insurance
- Parent: IAG New Zealand
- Website: www.nzi.co.nz

NZI or New Zealand Insurance is a major insurance company in New Zealand. NZI was formed in Auckland in 1859 as the New Zealand Insurance Company and is one of New Zealand's largest and longest-serving fire and general insurance brands. NZI is a subsidiary of IAG New Zealand.

== History ==
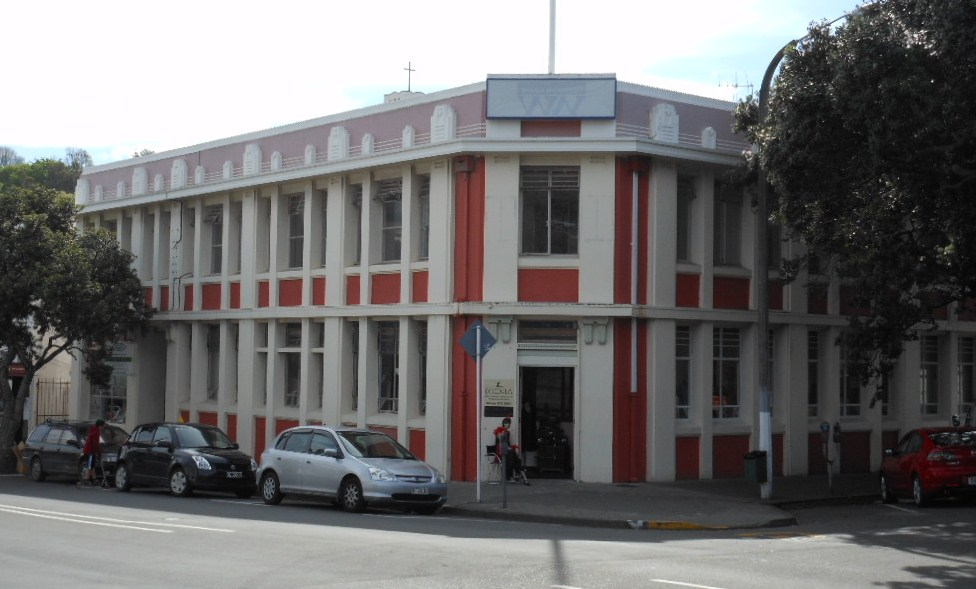
The former New Zealand Insurance Building in Napier

The company was founded in 1859 in Auckland and, in a nation where almost every building was wooden, New Zealand Insurance expanded quickly. In 1861 it opened Wellington and London offices. In the 1860s it established a New Zealand-wide network, then a similar network in Australia to distribute its insurance products.

In the 1870s it opened offices in the United States and in the 1880s created agencies in Asian countries. In 1881 New Zealand Insurance insured the first shipment of frozen meat to London. In 1886 it opened an office in Argentina and in the 1890s it opened an office in South Africa.

After the 1906 San Francisco earthquake the New Zealand Insurance company was one of few insurers able to pay all claims in full. In 1912 it was one of the underwriters of the Titanic.

In 1981, NZI merged with South British Insurance; the two companies had been equally matched rivals and were virtually the same size, but with different emphasis on the types of business they held. The new company formed a parent, New Zealand South British Group Ltd, which maintained both brands concurrently before changing to the NZI Corporation in 1984 when the South British brand was phased out. General Accident bought NZI in 1989.

In January 2003, Insurance Australia Group acquired NZI when purchasing the general insurance business of Aviva, a successor of General Accident. NZI is now a subsidiary of IAG New Zealand. NZI focuses on providing products to the intermediated market, i.e. brokers and banks.

In 2019, it was the title sponsor of the Wellington Sevens event in the IRB Sevens World Series for international rugby sevens teams and TVNZ business programme NZI Business.
