= State Insurance =

New Zealand insurance company

- Headquarters: Auckland
- Location: New Zealand
- Services: General insurance, business insurance, life insurance and travel insurance
- Parent organization: IAG New Zealand
- Website: www.state.co.nz

State Insurance is an insurance company based in New Zealand. As of 2011, it is a business division of IAG New Zealand, a subsidiary of Insurance Australia Group.

== History ==
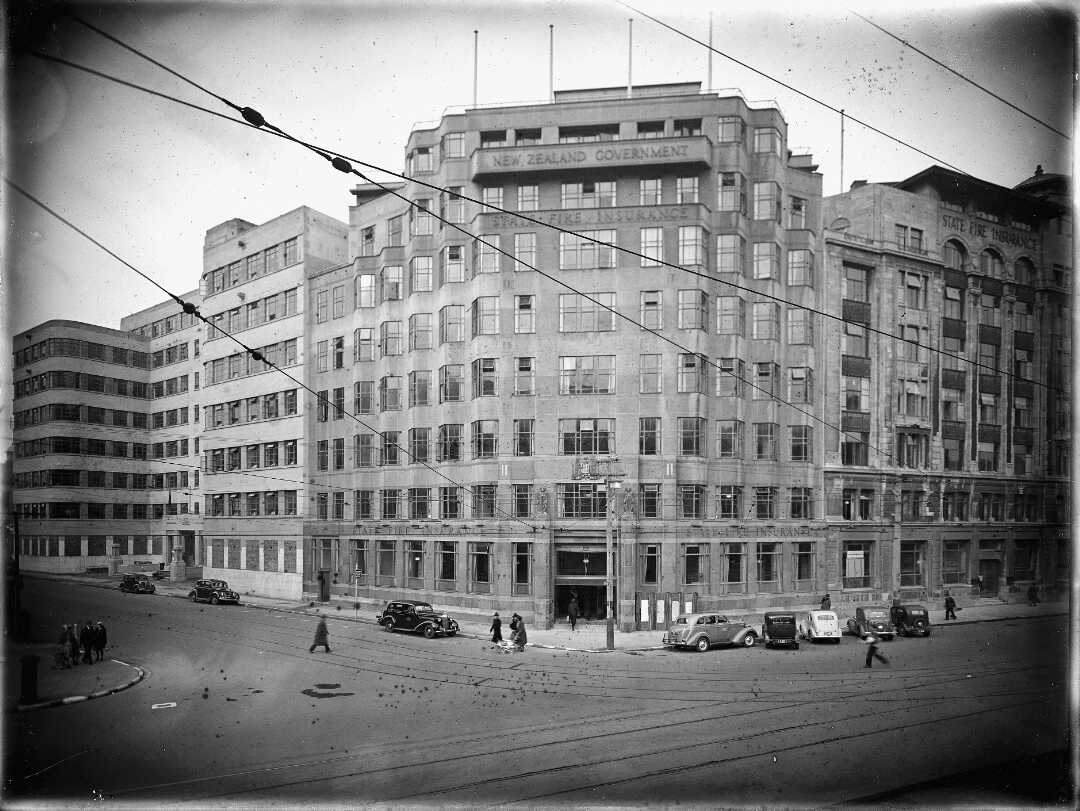
State Fire Insurance building (Architects: Gummer & Ford) on the corner of Stout Street and Lambton Quay, Wellington, circa 1942.

State Insurance was formerly called the State Insurance Office. Previously, it had been the State Fire and Accident Office.

The State Insurance Act 1990 repealed the State Insurance Act 1963 and created State Insurance as a state-owned enterprise.

In late 2014, State closed all but one of its branches saying that 94% of customers were conducting their business online or over the phone. The branch in Riccarton, Christchurch, remained open due to the specific customer needs in the area surrounding the 2011 Christchurch earthquake, until it closed in 2020.

The company has had well-known commercials that feature the song "Break My Stride".
