= Royal Automobile Club of Victoria =

Motoring club in Victoria, Australia

Royal Automobile Club of Victoria (RACV) Limited
- Formation: 1903
- Type: Roadside assistance, insurance, resorts, leisure, solar, home trades
- Headquarters: Bourke Street, Melbourne, Victoria, Australia
- Location: Victoria, Australia
- Members: 2.29 million (2025)
- President and chairman: Greg Robinson
- Key people: Neil Taylor, Managing Director and CEO
- Revenue: $1 billion Australian dollar (2025)
- Staff: 4,000+
- Website: www.racv.com.au

The Royal Automobile Club of Victoria, known as RACV, is a motoring club and mutual organisation based in Melbourne, Victoria and established in 1903.

RACV provides emergency roadside assistance, car loans, and trade services and distributes vehicle insurance and home insurance underwritten by multinational Insurance Australia Group (IAG), and distributes travel insurance issued by multinational Tokio Marine. The organisation operates ten properties across Victoria, Queensland, and Tasmania, and includes two clubs with locations in Melbourne and Healesville.

== History ==
The Royal Automobile Club of Victoria was founded on 9 December 1903 at the Port Phillip Club Hotel. The meeting was called by Syd Day, Henry James and James G. Coleman. At the time of the Club's establishment, there were 56 members, roughly equivalent to the number of cars in Melbourne at the time. Henry James Joseph "Harry" Maddox (1862–1937) was elected as its first President, and H.B. "Harry" James, its first secretary.

RACV’s founding objectives was as a social club for car and motorcycle owners and enthusiasts. The Club also aimed to influence the formation of fair driving regulations, advocating for motorists' interests and encouraging road improvement.

It held its first car rally at Aspendale Racecourse in 1904. In 1916, the club received the approval of King George V to prefix the title "Royal" to its name.

From 1907, the club issued driving certificates to competent drivers aged 16 and over, predating Victoria's 1910 legal requirement for proof of driving ability.

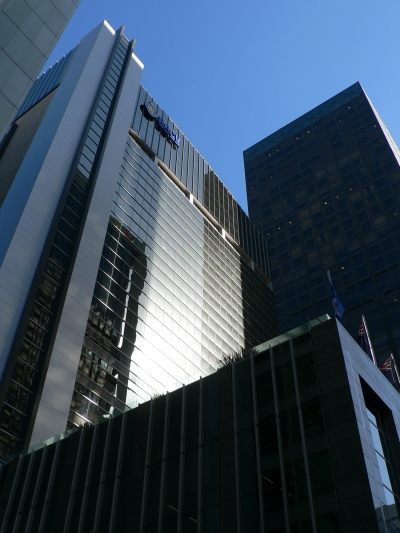
RACV Headquarters on Bourke Street, Melbourne

It is an unlisted public company, limited by guarantee, and headed by a board of directors consisting of eleven independent non-executive directors and a managing director and CEO. The registered office is located in the Melbourne central business district.

== Services and products ==
RACV provides servicing including emergency roadside assistance, motor insurance, home insurance, car loans, and trade services. RACV's emergency roadside assistance service started in November 1924 with four mechanics on BSA motorcycles patrolling the main traffic routes of Melbourne.

RACV Insurance was established in 1970, initially offering motor insurance products. Home insurance operations commenced in1990, providing policies for homeowners, renters and landlords.

RACV established a distribution relationship and underwriting joint venture with Insurance Australia Group (IAG) in 1999. Under this arrangement, IAG's short tail personal insurance products are distributed in Victoria under the RACV brand.

RACV established solar installation services in 2017 called RACV Solar. In 2019, the organisation acquired Gippsland Solar, a solar installation company based in the Latrobe Valley. According to the Bellarine Times, in 2021, RACV expanded the solar business to Ocean Grove, acquiring Great Ocean Solar and Electrical. Energy retail services commenced in 2022. In 2023, RACV acquired Bendigo-based solar retailer, Cola Solar.

Through Home Trades Hub Australia (HTHA), established in August 2020, the organisation provides trade services including plumbing, electrical work, and locksmith services. HTHA operates nationally using a network of tradespeople.

== Resorts and Clubs ==
RACV operates ten properties across Australia. Five resorts feature 18-hole golf courses: Cape Schanck, Torquay, Goldfields and Healesville Country Club & Resort in Victoria, and Royal Pines Resort in Queensland.

Victoria:

- RACV Cape Schanck Resort
- RACV Torquay Resort
- RACV Inverloch Resort
- RACV Goldfields Resort
- RACV Cobram Resort
- RACV Healesville Country Club & Resort

Queensland:

- RACV Royal Pines Resort
- RACV Noosa Resort

Tasmania:

- RACV Hobart Hotel

The RACV Club operates two locations: the Melbourne City Club in the Melbourne central business district and the Healesville Country Club & Resort.

== Publications ==
RACV's first magazine was published in 1922 as a supplement to The Australian Motorist. It was launched as a stand-alone publication in the mid-1920s called the Royal Auto Journal.

The Radiator, a newspaper-format publication, was introduced in the mid-1930s. In 1953 a new full-colour magazine, Royalauto, was launched, which later became the bimonthly member magazine RA, published in print and online.

As at September 2016, RoyalAuto had an audited circulation of over 1.4 million, with sources claiming it was Australia's highest-circulating monthly magazine. Today, content continues to be published in the News & Lifestyle section of the RACV website.
