= State Government Insurance Office (Queensland) =

Statutory authority in Queensland, Australia

The State Government Insurance Office (SGIO) was a statutory authority in Queensland, Australia.

== History ==
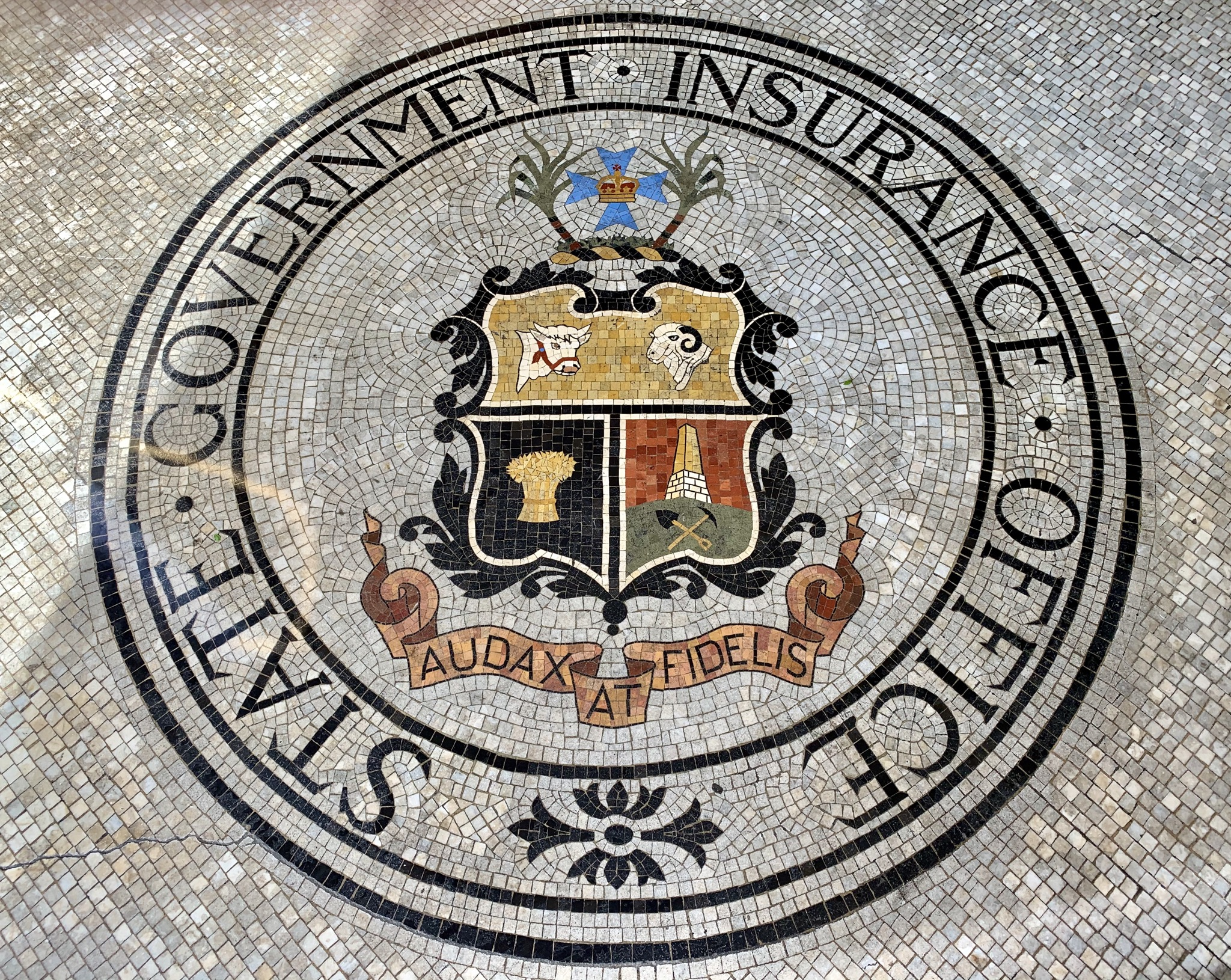
State Government Insurance Office logo at former Family Services Building in Brisbane

The Queensland Government established the State Government Insurance Office (SGIO) on 1 February 1917. The existing State Accident Insurance Office became the Workers' Compensation Department of the SGIO. The SGIO was responsible for insuring state assets and offering life insurance and general insurance (house, car) to the Queensland public.

On 1 March 1986 it was merged into Suncorp.
