= SGIO (Western Australia) =

Insurance brand in Western Australia

- Traded as: ASX: SGI
- Founded: 15 June 1926
- Founder: Government of Western Australia
- Defunct: December 2022
- Headquarters: West Perth
- Area served: Western Australia
- Products: Insurance
- Parent: Insurance Australia Group
- Website: www.sgio.com.au

SGIO was an insurance company founded and based in Western Australia. Established in 1926 as the State Government Insurance Office by the Government of Western Australia, it provides business insurance. It is a subsidiary of Insurance Australia Group (IAG).

The company also previously offered personal insurance. In June 2022, IAG announced that SGIO will no longer offer personal insurance to customers, and will transfer new and existing customers to NRMA Insurance from December 2022.

== History ==
On 15 June 1926, the Government of Western Australia established the State Government Insurance Office (SGIO) to provide workers' compensation insurance to miners in the Kalgoorlie goldfields. In August 1992, the Lawrence Government announced the SGIO was to be sold. This was completed in March 1994 with the SGIO listed on the Australian Securities Exchange (ASX). In 1998 the NRMA and Wesfarmers both made takeover offers with the NRMA ultimately successful and the SGIO delisted from the ASX in January 1999. In August 2000, it became part of the Insurance Australia Group when this was spun off from the NRMA.

SGIO held a monopoly in its early days in workers compensation insurance which made this company a strong competitor. SGIO now provides both personal and commercial insurances and is one of Western Australia's largest general insurance companies. Subsequently, other forms of insurance were offered through SGIO.

In 2011, SGIO conducted the Reversing Visibility Index by testing 243 cars on their reversing cameras. With this test, they found that 14 percent scored a full five-star rating (the five-star rating indicated better reversing visibility than all other vehicles) with was higher than their previous testing in 2010. This testing was a result of previous research from SGIO that showed 65 percent of Western Australian drivers had a near miss while reversing. SGIO showed their support after this testing for reverse cameras as it showed an improvement in safety ratings. The company then called for manufacturers to continue the trend of including reverse cameras in new cars.

In June 2022, the Insurance Australia Group announced that SGIO will no longer offer personal insurance, and will begin transferring new and existing SGIO personal insurance customers to the NRMA Insurance brand starting in December 2022. Despite this, IAG will continue to offer business insurance under the SGIO brand.

== Sponsorships ==
SGIO was a major sponsor of the West Coast Eagles from 1988 until 2018. It became the West Coast Eagles' naming rights sponsor in 2000.

In 2016, SGIO and the West Coast Eagles started up a campaign called “SGIO Surprisingly Good Goals” to help raise money for charities that help the community in Western Australia. The campaign raised money by having SGIO donate $200 per West Coast goal. They also were able to engage the fans into this campaign event by having them submit their own videos of their “good goals” and donated $20 to charity per submission. By the end of the season SGIO and the West Coast Eagles reached their goal of $100,000, and with this money raised they were able to donate to three different charities in Western Australia: Reconciliation WA, Lifeline WA and the Motor Neurone Disease Association of WA.

== See also ==
- Insurance Commission of Western Australia, another state-owned insurer in Western Australia.
