= 2022 New Zealand Radio Awards =

- Awarded for: Excellence in radio broadcasting
- Country: New Zealand
- Presented by: Radio Broadcasters Association
- Website: radioawards.co.nz

The 2022 New Zealand Radio Awards are the awards for excellence in the New Zealand radio industry during 2021. It was the 45th New Zealand Radio Awards, recognising staff, volunteers and contractors in both commercial and non-commercial broadcasting.

The nominees were announced on 11 May 2022, with the award winners announced during a virtual ceremony held on 21 July 2022.[3][4]

== Winners & Finalists ==
Best Content Director / Content Team
- Winner: Jason Winstanley, Edward Swift, Laura Heathcote (Newstalk ZB Network)
- Finalists:
  - Ross Flahive (ZM Network)
  - Will Maisey, Kris Edwards, Christian Boston (The Breeze Network)
Best Show Producer or Producing Team - Music Show
- Winner: Ben McDowell, Anastasia Loeffen (ZM's Bree & Clint, ZM Network)
- Finalists:
  - Hamish Phipps, Cal Payne (The Edge Breakfast, The Edge Network)
  - Anna Henvest, Jared Pickstock, Carwen Jones (ZM's Fletch, Vaughan & Megan, ZM Network)
  - Ben Humphrey, Juliet Wrathall (The Hits Breakfast with Jono & Ben, The Hits Network)
Best Show Producer or Producing Team - Talk Show
- Winner: Michael Allan, Sam Carran, Glenn Hart (The Mike Hosking Breakfast, Newstalk ZB Network)
- Finalists:
  - Helen McCarthy (Kerre McIvor Mornings, Newstalk ZB Network)
  - Laura Beattie, Laura Cunningham, Anthony Milicich (Heather du Plessis-Allan Drive, Newstalk ZB Network)
Best Station Imaging
- Winner: Alistair Cockburn, Brynee Wilson, Sam Harvey, Zoe Norton (ZM Network)
- Finalists:
  - Kieran Bell (Mai FM Network)
  - Alastair Boyes, Aaron Watkinson (The Hits Network)
  - Josh Wood, Mel Dooley (More FM Network)
Best Station Trailer
- Winner: ZM's Add To Cart (Alistair Cockburn, Tom Harper, Sarah Accorsi, Claire Chellew, ZM Network)
- Finalists:
  - Every Caller Wins (Grant Brodie, The Edge Network)
  - Mai Morning Crew 'Wake Up' Jingle (Kieran Bell, Grant Brodie, Callum Rei, Equippers Church Choir, Mai FM Network)
Best Video - Short Form
- Winner: Taskmaster NZ Co-Pro (Claire Chellew, Anthony Plant, Allan George, Susan Bridges, Evan Paea, Radio Hauraki Network)
- Finalists:
  - Beer & Pie July (Claire Chellew, Tom Harper, Christian Goeffic, Anthony Plant, NZME Sound & Vision Team, Radio Hauraki Network)
  - Who's Eating New Zealand (Cole Eastham-Farrelly, Farah Hancock, Vinay Ranchhod, RNZ)
Best Video - Long Form
- Winner: An Interview With a Mobster (Ryan Bridge, Thomas Thexton, Kim Blair, Oscar Jackson, Chris Reeder, Aaron Ly, Magic Talk)
- Finalists:
  - Choose To Be Happy (Ryan Bridge, Thomas Thexton, Kim Blair, Oscar Jackson, Chris Reeder, Magic Talk)
  - Riffing with Crowded House (Aaron Ly, Nathan Muller, Amber Khoo, Dean Young, Grant Brodie, The Sound Network)
Best Network Station Promotion
- Winner: The Box (Alistair Cockburn, Gary Pointon, ZM Network)
- Finalists:
  - Raro Vaxcation (Caitlin Coffey, Mitchell Fulton, Casey Sullivan, Martijn Hehewerth, The Edge Network)
  - Ryan Bridge's 36 Hr Talkathon (Ryan Bridge, Chris Reeder, Tom Thexton, Lee Gilmour, Grace Rhynd, Penny Quirk, Oscar Jackson, Michael Baker, Ricky Bannister, Dayna Rukka, Brad Wright, Carl Thompson, Jim Cowan, Magic Talk)
Best Single Market Station Promotion
- Winner: Breeze Jingle in Te Reo Māori (Robert Rakete, Jeanette Thomas, Braydon Priest, Grace Rhynd, Will Maisey, Hemi Kelly, Waimarie Kakahi, The Breeze Auckland)
- Finalists:
  - $5,000 Birthday Bingo! (John Markby, Angela 'Flash' Gordon, Tauha 'Toast' Te Kani, Tania Burgess, Sara O'Dwyer, Mel Dooley, More FM Northland)
  - Nick The Tix (Mitchell Fulton, Hilary Schroeder, Steve Broad, Todd Fisher, Nikita Leck, Jess Taylor, The Edge Canterbury)
Best Digital Content
- Winner: ZM Online (Megan Sagar, Carwen Jones, Sarah Mount, Rowan Naude, Ella Shepherd, Gary Pointon, ZM Network)
- Finalists:
  - The Rock (Raynor Perreau, Michael Baker, Digital Team, The Rock Network)
  - The Edge (Ricky Bannister, Jerome Sears, Brii Jamieson, Digital Team, The Edge Network)
Best Digital Content - Single Post
- Winner: Jay & Dunc's Nicknames (Raynor Perreau, Jay Reeve, Dunc Heyde, Jeremy Pickford, The Rock Network)
- Finalists:
  - Good Morning to Everyone except Brian Tamaki (Brii Jamieson, Ricky Bannister, Caitlin Coffey, Mitchell Fulton, Cate Owen, The Edge Network)
  - ZM's Te Reo Sour Puss (Megan Sagar, ZM Network)
Best Entertainment Podcast
- Winner: Tic-Heads with Uncle Tics (Leighton Clarke, Clinton Randell, Asher Bastion, Rorie McGregor, Lisa Diedricks, Richard Culph, rova / The Edge)
- Finalists:
  - The Trainee Sexologist - Season 2 (Morgan Penn, Sharyn Casey, Dayna Ruka, Lisa Diedricks, Sophie Van Soest, Rorie McGregor, Asher Bastion, Rebecca Frank, Richard Culph, rova / The Edge)
  - Black Sheep (William Ray, Tim Watkin, William Saunders, Phil Benge, Marc Chesterman, Steve Burridge, RNZ National)
Best Factual Podcast
- Winner: Aotearoa Hip Hop: The Music, The People, The History (Phil Bell, Martyn Pepperell, Grant Brodie, Asher Bastion, Laura Spence, Nick Brown, Lisa Diedricks, Rorie McGregor, Rebecca Frank, Richard Culph, rova / Mai FM)
- Finalists:
  - Our Changing World (Claire Concannon, Katy Gosset, Phil Benge, Alison Ballance, RNZ)
  - Red Line (Guyon Espiner, John Daniell, Justin Gregory, Blair Stagpole, Veronica Schmidt, Tim Watkin, RNZ)
Best Branded Podcast
- Winner: HP Business Class (Phil Guyan, Heather du Plessis-Allan, Josh Couch, Mick Andrews, Stephanie Soh, Emma Freeman, Anna Lawson, Drum Agency / Newstalk ZB)
- Finalists:
  - Footprint (Phil Guyan, Francesca Rudkin, Mick Andrews, Josh Couch, Stephanie Soh, Grace Bucknell, Kate Jones, Sarah Catran, Emma Freeman, Linda Forsman, CBA / Newstalk ZB)
  - The New World Beer & Cider Award Audio Guide (Jacki Polkinghorne, Sarah Catran, Lauren Simpkins, Bonnie Jansen, iHeart Radio)
Best Podcast by a Radio Show
- Winner: The Matt & Jerry Show Podcast (Matt Heath, Jeremy Wells, Chris Goodwin, Finn Caddie, Radio Hauraki / iHeart Radio)
- Finalists:
  - Morning Report (Susie Ferguson, Corin Dann, Martin Gibson, Denise Garland, Maree Corbett, Jane Dunbar, Katie Fitzgerald, Charlotte Cook, Daniel Gilhooly, Amber-Leigh Woolf, Samuel Wat, Mahvash Ikram, David Cohen, Karen Brown, Michael Cropp, Christine Cessford, Patrick Hunn, Esther Zweifel, Karoline Tuckey, Lily Dela Porta, Kim Griggs, Stacey Knott, Rosie Bradbury, Siobhan Wilson, RNZ)
  - ZM's Fletch, Vaughan & Megan (Carl Fletcher, Vaughan Smith, Megan Papas, Anna Henvest, Jared Pickstock, Carwen Jones, Hayley Sproull, ZM Network)
The Blackie Award
- Winner: Hayley's Driver's Licence (Hayley Sproull, ZM Network)
- Finalists:
  - Catching a Cheater (Sharyn Casey, Jayden King, Dan Webby, Raynor Perreau, The Edge Network)
  - The Hauraki Big Show - Caravan Withdrawal (Jason Hoyte, Mike Minogue, Joseph Shuker, Chris Key, Joe Durie, Tom Harper, Lauren Simpkins, Joel Harrison, Radio Hauraki Network)
Best Access Radio Programme
- Winner: Getting Here: Migration Stories by NZ Refugees (Lana Hart, Mehdi Azimi, Bryony LaLaštovička, Plains FM)
- Finalist: Radio Toranj (Hero Modares, Milad Yazdanpanah, Plains FM)
Best Children's Programme
- Winner: Ali & Gab (Suzy Cato, Trevor Plant, Phil Yule, Brad Hemingway, Jack Andrews, Treehut Ltd)
- Finalists:
  - Marcus Lush Nights Kids' Talkback (Marcus Lush, Dan Goodwin, Newstalk ZB)
  - Storytime (Duncan Smith, RNZ National)
Best Daily or Weekly Feature - Factual
- Winner: Country Life (Carol Stiles, Sally Round, Cosmo Kentish-Barnes, Duncan Smith, RNZ National)
- Finalists:
  - Black Sheep (William Ray, Tim Watkin, RNZ National)
  - Our Changing World (Claire Concannon, Katy Gosset, Phil Benge, Alex Harmer, Alison Ballance, RNZ National)
Best Documentary or Factual Talk Feature
- Winner: Fragments (Katy Gosset, Justin Gregory, Tim Watkin, Alex Harmer, Rangi Powick, Kadambari Raghukumar, Sandra Close, Julie Hutton, Nate McKinnon, RNZ National)
- Finalists:
  - Untold Pacific (Sonia Yee, Koro Vaka Úta, William Saunders, Marc Chesterman, Sefa Taouma, Tuki Laumea, Tim Watkin, RNZ National)
  - Red Line (Guyon Espiner, John Daniell, Justin Gregory, Blair Stagpole, Veronica Schmidt, Tim Watkin, RNZ National)
Best Music Feature
- Winner: The Breeze Top 100 80's Countdown (Will Maisey, Kris Edwards, Rick Dees, Jimmy Barnes, Annie Crummer, John Parr, Kim Wilde, Ivan Laskov, Paul Hollins, Matthew Wilder, The Breeze Network)
- Finalists:
  - Ed Sheeran Takeover (Martijn Hehewerth, Grant Brodie, Clinton Randell, Steph Monks, Chris Parker, Hamish Phipps, Callum Payne, The Edge Network)
  - The George FM DNB Hundy (Dan Matthews, Shawn Cleaver, Dean Campbell, Kieran Bell, Tiki Taane, Ben Whitehead, Corbin Baxter, George FM Network)
Best Network Team Show
- Winner: ZM's Fletch, Vaughan & Megan (Carl Fletcher, Vaughan Smith, Megan Papas, Anna Henvest, Sarah Mount, Jared Pickstock, Carwen Jones, Hayley Sproull, ZM Network)
- Finalists:
  - The Morning Rumble (Roger Farrelly, Andrew Mulligan, Bryce Casey, Mel Abbot, Ryan Maguire, Guy Mansell, The Rock Network)
  - ZM's Bree & Clint (Bree Tomasei, Clint Roberts, Ben McDowell, Anastasia Loeffen, ZM Network)
  - The Hits Breakfast with Jono & Ben (Jono Pryor, Ben Boyce, Ben Humphrey, Julie Wrathall, The Hits Network)
Best Network Music Host / Duo
- Winner: Steph Monks The Edge Workday (The Edge Network)
- Finalists:
  - Robert Scott Breeze Drive (The Breeze Network)
  - Sean Hill & Sophie Nathan The Edge Nights (The Edge Network)
Best Local Team Show
- Winner: John, Flash & Toast (John Markby, Angela 'Flash' Gordon, Tauha 'Toast' Te Kani, Tania Burgess, More FM Northland)
- Finalists:
  - Callum & P (Callum Procter, Patrina Roche, The Hits Dunedin)
  - Robert & Jeanette (Robert Rakete, Jeanette Thomas, Will Maisey, Braydon Priest, The Breeze Auckland)
Best Local Music Host
- Winner: Dave Nicholas (The Hits Auckland)
- Finalists:
  - Blair Kiddey (The Breeze Nelson)
  - Amber Russell (More FM Canterbury)
Best Show - Non Surveyed Market
- Winner: More FM Rodney Breakfast with Brent & Jacque (Brent Burridge, Jacque Tucker, Jason Royal, Dean McGovern, Anna McGovern, More FM Rodney)
- Finalists:
  - Breakfast with Phill Hooper (Phill Hooper, Hokonui Ashburton)
  - More FM Breakfast with Andrew Leiataua (Andrew Leiataua, Rodger Clamp, Dave Rybinski, Andrew Chapman, More FM Taupo)
Best Talk Presenter - Breakfast or Drive
- Winner: Heather du Plessis-Allan (Heather du Plessis-Allan Drive, Newstalk ZB Network)
- Finalists:
  - Susie Ferguson, Corin Dann (Morning Report, RNZ National)
  - Mike Hosking (The Mike Hosking Breakfast, Newstalk ZB Network)
Best Talk Presenter - Non-Breakfast or Drive
- Winner: Marcus Lush (Marcus Lush Nights, Newstalk ZB Network)

Finalists:

  - Kate Hawkesby (Early Edition with Kate Hawkesby, Newstalk ZB Network)
  - Simon Barnett & James Daniels (Simon Barnett & James Daniels Afternoons, Newstalk ZB Network)
  - Kim Hill (Saturday Morning, RNZ National)

Finalists:

  - Kate Hawkesby (Early Edition with Kate Hawkesby, Newstalk ZB Network)
  - Simon Barnett & James Daniels (Simon Barnett & James Daniels Afternoons, Newstalk ZB Network)
  - Kim Hill (Saturday Morning, RNZ National)
Best New Broadcaster - Journalist

Winner: Louise Ternouth (RNZ National) Finalists:

  - Aaron Dahmen (Newstalk ZB Network)
  - Jason Walls (Newstalk ZB Network)
Best New Broadcaster - Off-Air

Winner: Jak Pickering (Tahu FM) Finalists:

  - Raynor Perreau (MediaWorks)
  - Shannon Trim (Coast Network)
Best New Broadcaster - On-Air

Winner: Matthew Pledger (More FM Auckland) Finalists:

  - Meg Wyatt (ZM Network)
  - Sophie Nathan (The Edge Network)
The Johnny Douglas Award

Winner: Cameron Bevan (MediaWorks) Finalists:

  - Brenna Creahan (NZME)
  - Jessica Dermody
Best News or Sports Journalist

Winner: Anusha Bradley (RNZ National) Finalists:

  - Elliott Smith (Newstalk ZB Network)
  - Samantha Olley (RNZ National)
Best News Story - Team Coverage

Winner: Delta 2021 (Newstalk ZB Team, Newstalk ZB Network) Finalists:

  - National's Leadership Drama (Newstalk ZB Team, Newstalk ZB Network)
  - Checkpoint - 2021 Summer Olympics (Pip Keane, Annabel Bania, Lisa Owen, Matthew Hutching, Calvin Samuel, Alex Aylett-McMillan, Nick Monro, Nick Truebridge, Louise Termouth, Marika Khazabi, Tim Brown, Clay Wilson, Maja Burry, RNZ National)
  - New Lynn Terrorist Attack (Newstalk ZB Team, Newstalk ZB Network)
Best Newsreader

Winner: Niva Retimanu (Newstalk ZB Network) Finalists:

  - Rachel Jackson-Lees (Hits / ZM / Hauraki / Coast)
  - Raylene Ramsay (Newstalk ZB Network)
Best Sports Reader, Presenter or Commentator

Winner: D'Arcy Waldegrave (All Sport Breakfast & Sportstalk, Newstalk ZB Network) Finalists:

  - Brian Kelly (The Country Sport Breakfast, Gold AM Network)
  - Jason Pine (Weekend Sport, Newstalk ZB Network)
Best Sports Story - Team Coverage

Winner: ICC World Test Championship (Bryan Waddle, Jeremy Coney, Andrew Alderson, Malcolm Jordan, Peter McGlashan, Craig Cumming, Andy McDonnell, Gold AM Network) Finalists:

  - 2021 America's Cup (Peter Montgomery, Chris Steel, Angus Mabey, Andy McDonnell, Newstalk ZB Team, Newstalk ZB Network)
  - Tokyo Olympics (Newstalk ZB Team, Andy McDonnell, Newstalk ZB Network)
Best Client Promotion/Activation

Winner: Jono & Ben's Battery Operated Torch Tour with The Warehouse (Harriett Whiting, Danielle Tolich, Ben Boyce, Jono Pryor, Ben Humphrey, Margaret Hawker, Gareth McDonald, Ben Sullivan, Sarah De Villiers, Jessica Boell, Anthony Plant, The Hits Network) Finalists:

  - Bree & Clint Listener Box Meal (Dannii Gardner, Danielle Tolich, Bree Tomasei, Clint Roberts, Ben McDowell, Anastasia Loeffen, Celia Whitley, ZM Network)
  - Neon Secret Sound (Celia Whitley, Ross Flahive, Gary Pointon, Alistair Cockburn, Aileen Lau, Danielle Tolich, Megan Sagar, Ella Shepherd, Sarah Mount, Jacqui Roberts, ZM Network)
  - KFC Craving Vaxx Facts (Aileen Lau, Danielle Tolich, Ben McDowell, Rosie Gordon, Georgia Burt, Azura Lane, Megan Sagar, Rowan Naude, Sarah Mount, Cameron Mansel, Astley Nathan, Ben Sullivan, ZM & Flava)
Best Marketing Campaign

Winner: Newstalk ZB Brand (Monique Hodgson, Xanthe Williams, Sarah Swanton, Graham Dolan, Newstalk ZB) Finalists:

  - Jono & Ben's 5 Words for $5k (Jacqui Davis, Emily Hancox, Todd Campbell, Xanthe Williams, Ben Humphrey, Jono Pryor, Ben Boyce, The Hits Network)
  - Play ZM (Jacqui Davis, Jennifer Pryor, Xanthe Williams, Ross Flahive, ZM Network)
Best Commercial Campaign

Winner: NRC - Road Safety Strategy (Alastair Barran, Chris Hurring, MediaWorks) Finalists:

  - Confinement Escape Rooms Taupo - Are You In? (Lucas Hogan, Cara Botica, Rew Shearer, Stephen Lovatt, Jacquie Nairn, Glenn Hart, Lucas Hogan, Daniel Wood, Adam Pomana, ZM Taupo)
  - NRC - Bits & Pieces Campaign (Alastair Barran, Chris Hurring, MediaWorks)
Best Commercial Production

Winner: NRC - Bits & Pieces (Alastair Barran, Chris Hurring, Hamish Nixon, Hannah Venneman, Tiegan Lilley, Jeremy Pickford, MediaWorks) Finalists:

  - Mai Morning Crew 'Wake Up' Jingle (Kieran Bell, Grant Brodie, Callum Rei, Equippers Church Choir, Mai FM)
  - NRC - Timeline (Alastair Barran, Chris Hurring, Hamish Nixon, Hannah Venneman, Kim Sole, Jess Smith, MediaWorks)
Best Single Commercial

Winner: NRC - Bits & Pieces (Alastair Barran, Chris Hurring, Hannah Venneman, Hamish Nixon, MediaWorks) Finalists:

  - Starco - Wifi Signal (Rew Shearer, Cara Botica, Daniel Wood, Stephen Lovatt, NZME)
  - Timaru Taxis - Number (Alastair Barran, Chris Hurring, Hamish Nixon, MediaWorks)
Best Voice Talent

Winner: Chris Ryan (NZME) Finalists:

  - Dan Webby (The Edge Network)
  - Hamish Nixon (MediaWorks)
Sales Team of the Year

Winner: NZME Taranaki (Nikki Verbeet, Tracey Blake, Colleen Deegan, Carole Morgan, Julie Petley, NZME) Finalists:

  - MediaWorks Gisborne (Debby Cresswell, Mandy Fitzgerald, Ander Batarrita, Daksha Thakur, MediaWorks)
  - MediaWorks Canterbury (Kate Dinwiddie, MediaWorks)
Associated Craft Award

Winner: MediaWorks Trade Marketing Team (MediaWorks) Finalists:

  - MediaWorks Partnerships Team (MediaWorks)
  - MediaWorks Integration Team (MediaWorks)
Best Community Campaign

Winner: Day (and a bit) On The Darts (Andrew Mulligan, Bryce Casey, Roger Farrelly, Jacqueline Williams, Brad King, Jack Honeybone, Ryan Maguire, Mel Abbot, Guy Mansell, Raynor Perreau, Michael Baker, Jim Cowan, Sophie Currie, Joe Baxendale, Duncan Heyde, Jay Reeve, Jeremy Pickford, The Rock Network) Finalists:

  - Walking Stars Radio (Corinna Homer, Rorie McGregor, Elizabeth Dale, Liam Rassie, Richard Culph, Jay Jay Feeney, K'Lee McNabb, Nik Brown, Heather Keats, Lisa Diedricks, Rova / Because Creative Experiences)
  - The Edge 100k-araoke (Angela Wedekind, Caitlin Coffey, Megan Mansell, Dominic Harvey, Clinton Randell, Hamish Phipps, Callum Payne, Casey Sullivan, Carl Thompson, Jim Cowan, The Edge Network)
Network / Metropolitan Station of the Year

Winner: Newstalk ZB (NZME) Finalists:

  - More FM (MediaWorks)
  - The Breeze (MediaWorks)
  - ZM (NZME)
Local Station of the Year

Winner: More FM Northland (More FM) Finalists:

  - One Double X (Radio Bay of Plenty)
  - Sun FM (Sun FM)

== Special awards ==
Sir Paul Holmes Broadcaster of the Year: Mike Hosking

Outstanding Contribution to Radio:

- Hinewehi Mohi
- Brendan Smyth

Services to Broadcasting:

- Kate Rigg
- Owen Rooney
- Bob Gentil
- Iona McHenry
