= 2019 Birthday Honours (New Zealand) =

Awards list for New Zealand

2019 Queen's Birthday Honours
- Previous: 2019 Special Honours; Next: 2020 New Year Honours
- Type: New Zealand royal honours: New Zealand Order of Merit; Queen's Service Order; Queen's Service Medal; Distinguished Service Decoration
- Date: 3 June 2019
- Country: New Zealand
- Total recipients: 183

The 2019 Queen's Birthday Honours in New Zealand, celebrating the official birthday of Queen Elizabeth II, were appointments made by the Queen in her right as Queen of New Zealand, on the advice of the New Zealand government, to various orders and honours to reward and highlight good works by New Zealanders. They were announced on 3 June 2019.

The recipients of honours are listed here as they were styled before their new honour.

== New Zealand Order of Merit ==
=== Dame Companion (DNZM) ===
- Dr Susan Nicola Bagshaw CNZM – of Christchurch. For services to youth health.
- Yvette Winifred Corlett CNZM MBE – of Auckland. For services to athletics. (Note: Deceased. Her Majesty's approval of this award took effect on 12 April 2019, prior to the date of decease.)
- Areta Koopu CBE – of Auckland. For services to Māori and the community.
- Frances Rosemary Walsh MNZM – of Wellington. For services to film.
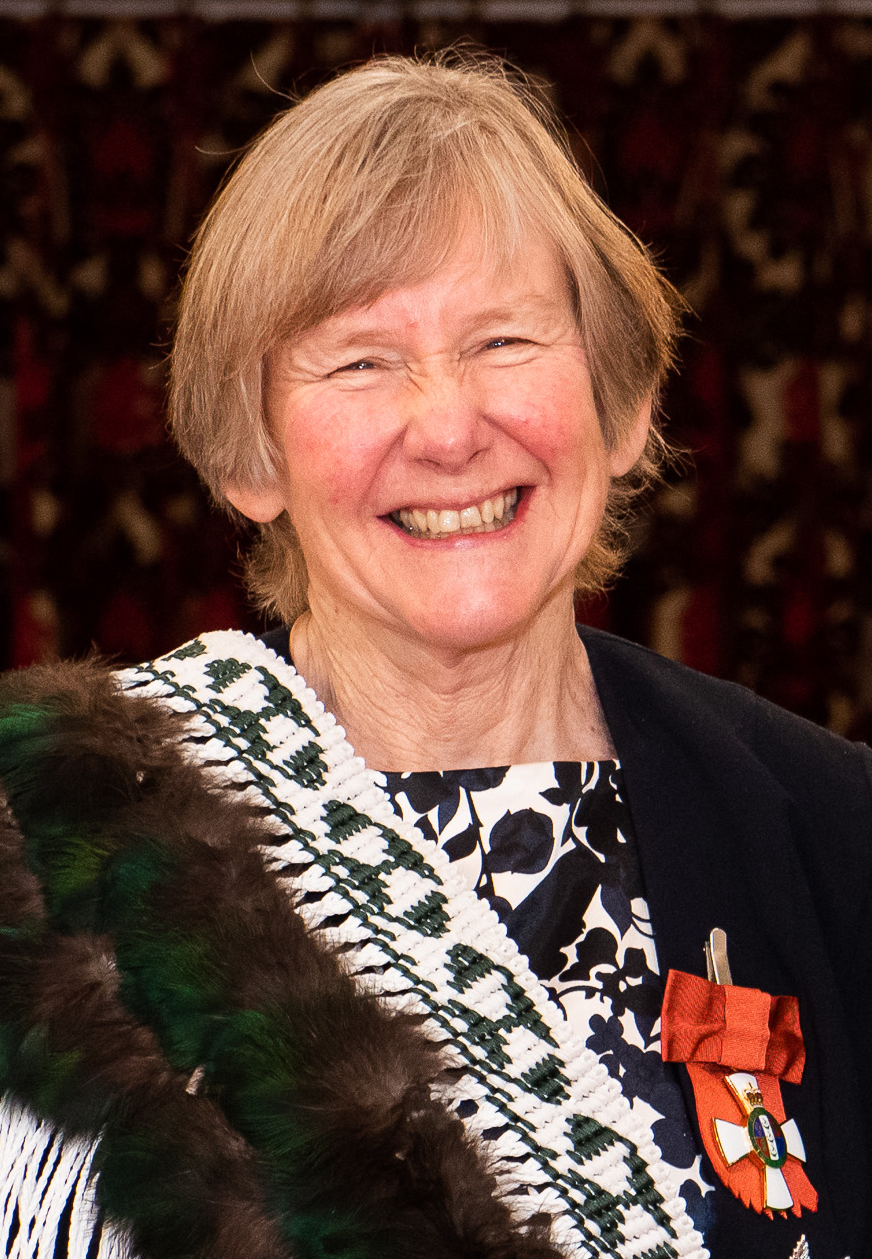
Dame Sue Bagshaw

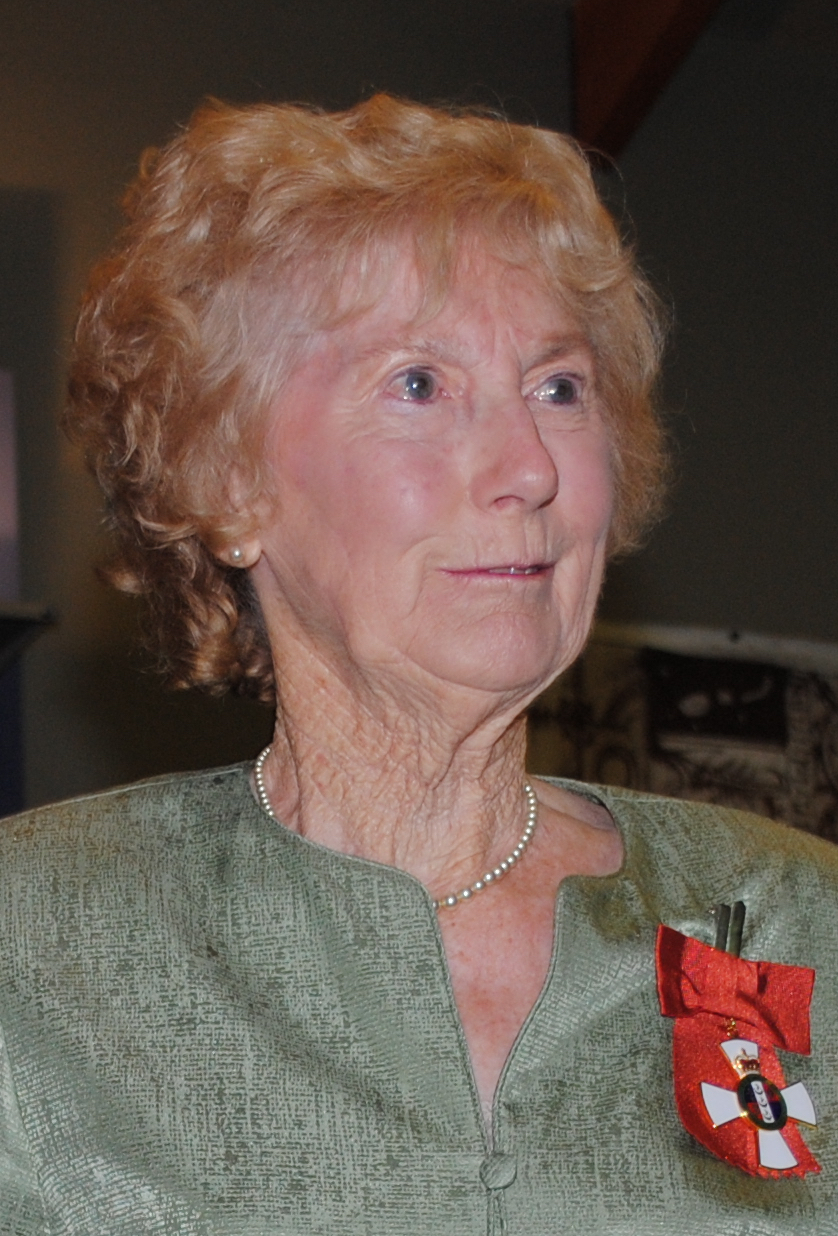
Dame Yvette Corlett

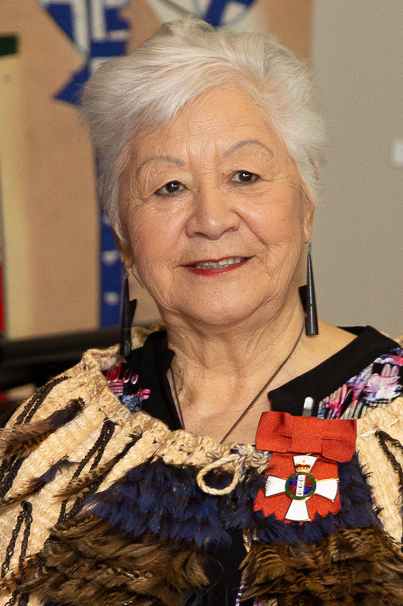
Dame Areta Koopu

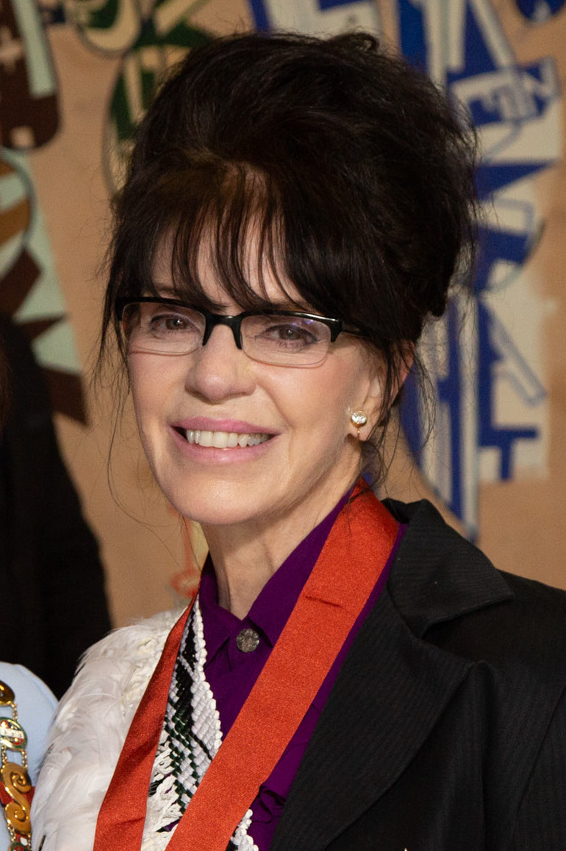
Dame Fran Walsh

=== Knight Companion (KNZM) ===
- Paul Hunter Adams CNZM – of Tauranga. For services to philanthropy and the community.
- Roger Leighton Hall CNZM QSO – of Auckland. For services to theatre.
- Graham Michael Lowe ONZM QSM – of Auckland. For services to youth and education.
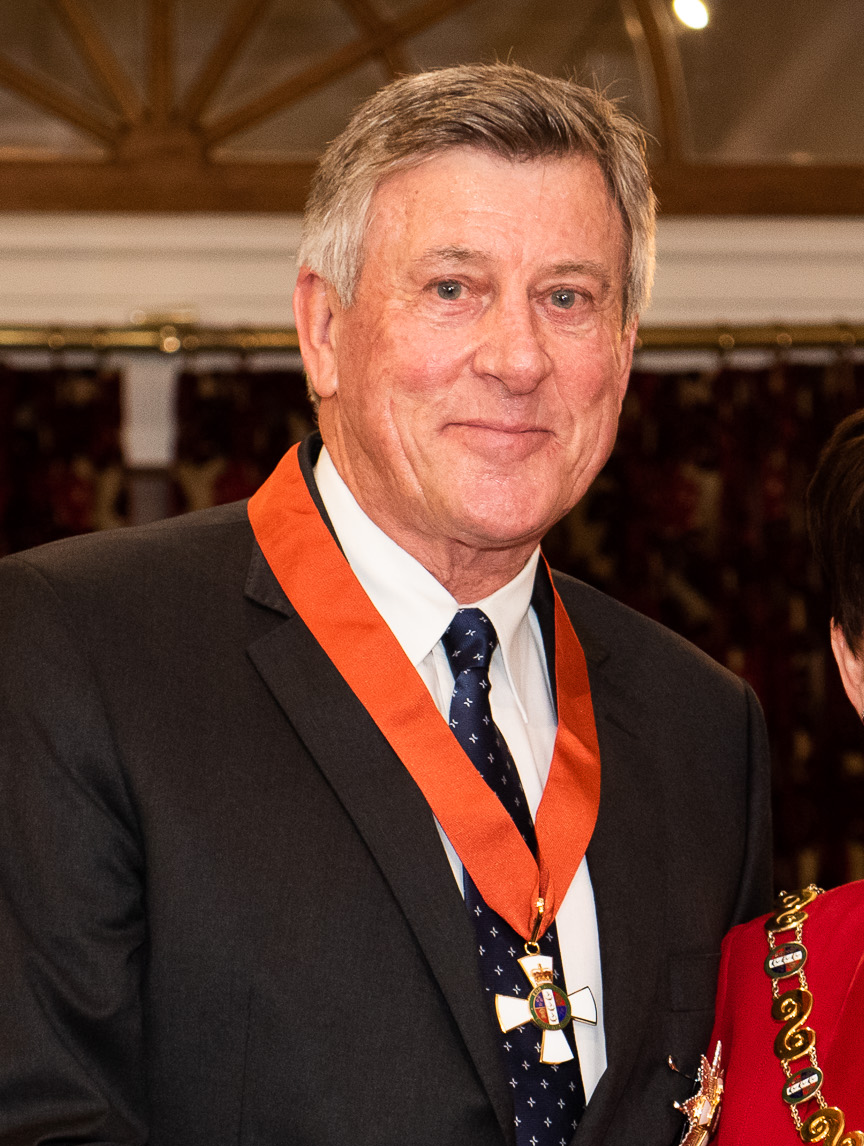
Sir Paul Adams

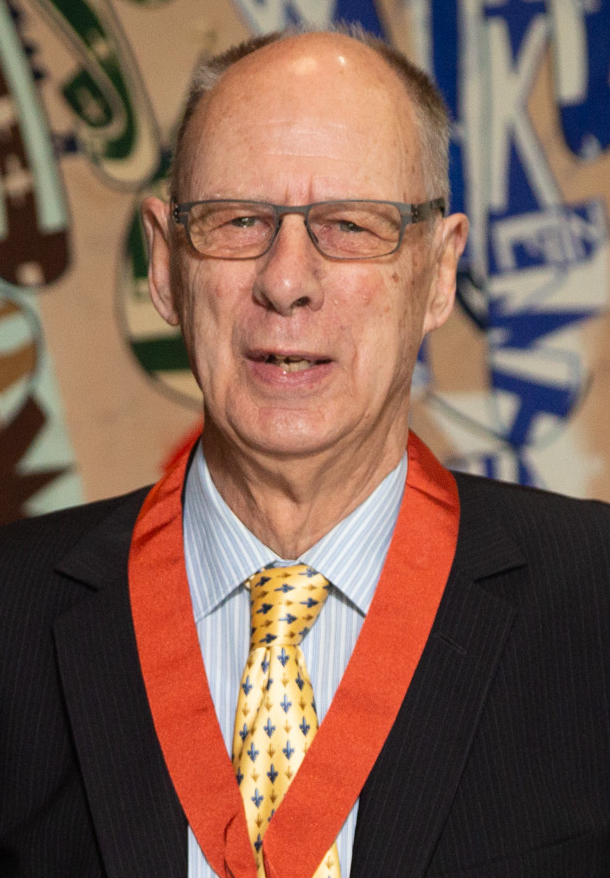
Sir Roger Hall

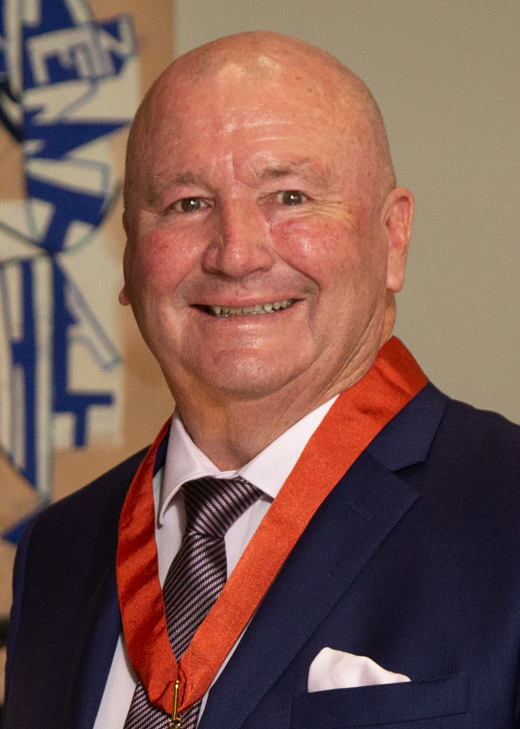
Sir Graham Lowe

=== Companion (CNZM) ===
- Dr Judith Estranna Aitken QSO – of Paekākāriki. For services to local government, the community and education.
- Roma Cherry Balzer QSO – of Hamilton. For services to family violence prevention.
- Scott Ronald Dixon MNZM – of Indianapolis, United States of America. For services to motorsport.
- Professor Charles Thomas Eason – of Nelson. For services to science and wildlife conservation.
- The Reverend John Alexander Marsden QSO JP – of Auckland. For services to Māori and the community.
- Elizabeth Jane Prichard QSO – of Auckland. For services to women.
- Ewan Francis Smith – of Aroa, Arorangi, Cook Islands. For services to Cook Islands business and tourism.
- Associate Professor Susan Margaret St John QSO – of Auckland. For services to social policy.
- Gary Vernon Taylor QSO – of Auckland. For services to the environment and resource management.
- Yvonne Mignon Willering ONZM – of Auckland. For services to netball.
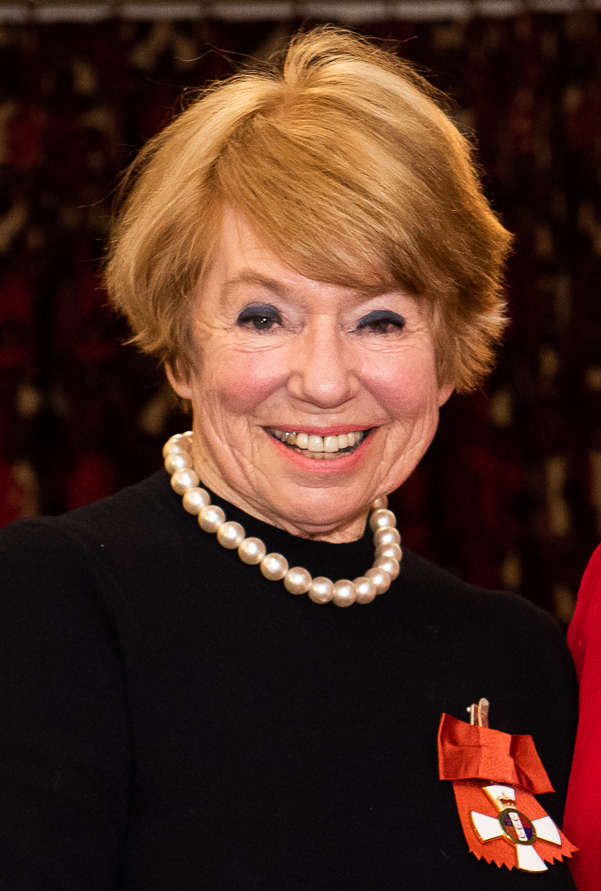
Judith Aitken

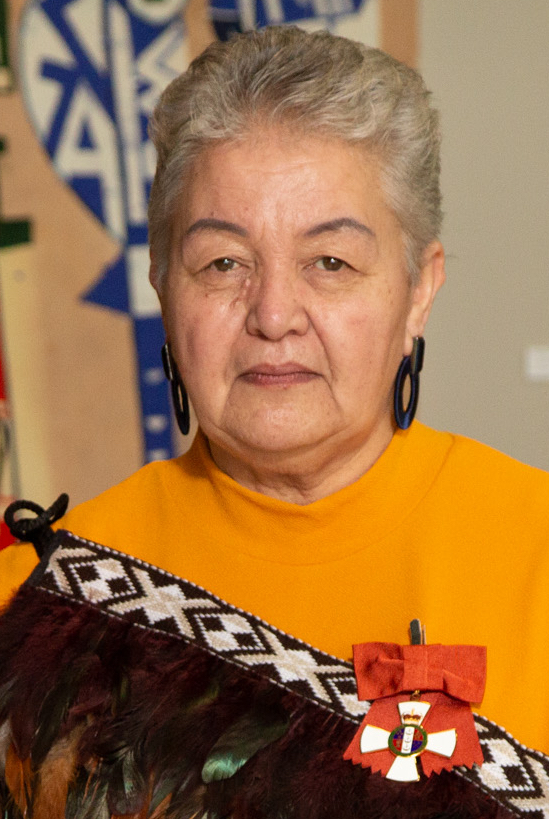
Roma Balzer

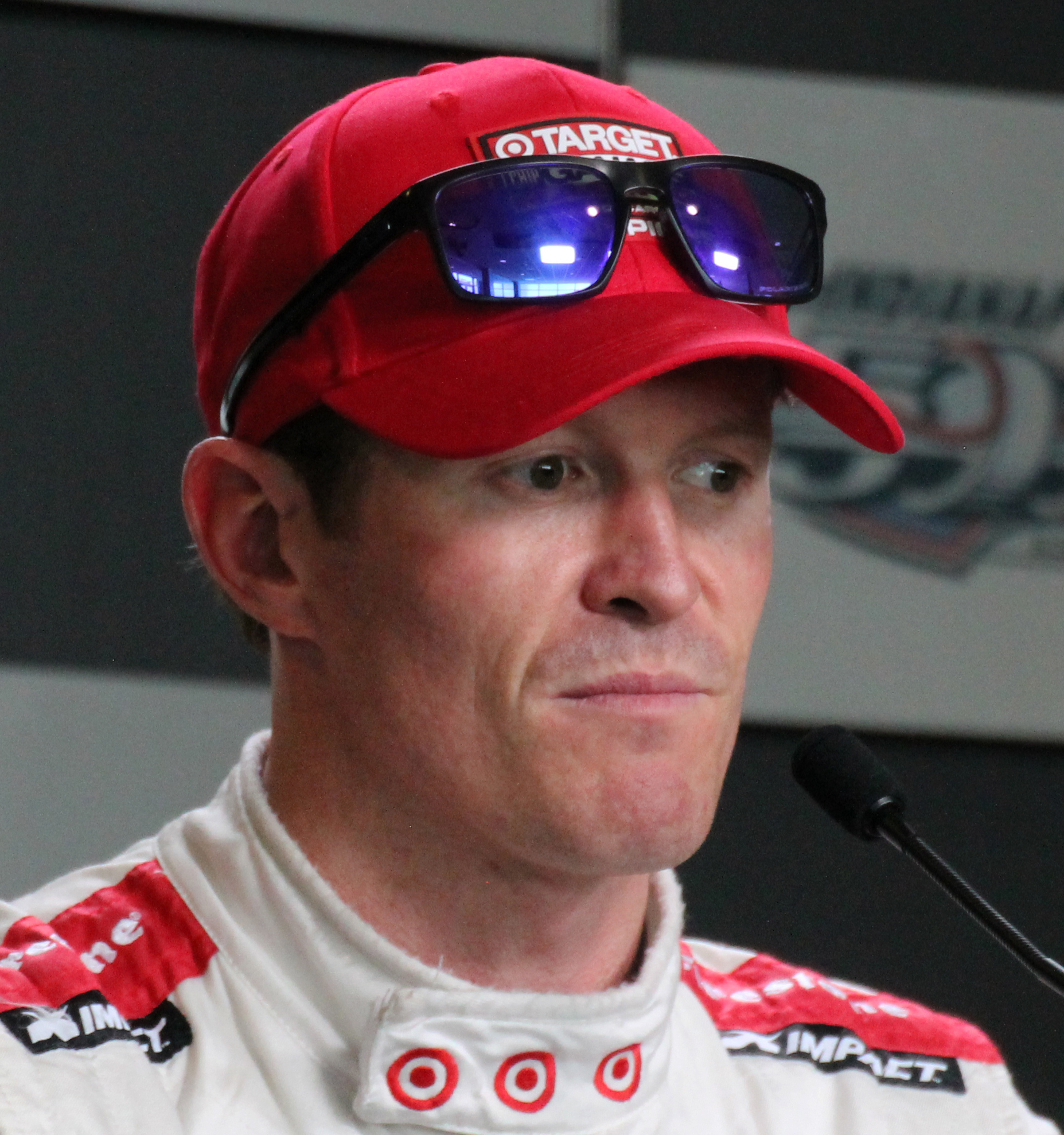
Scott Dixon

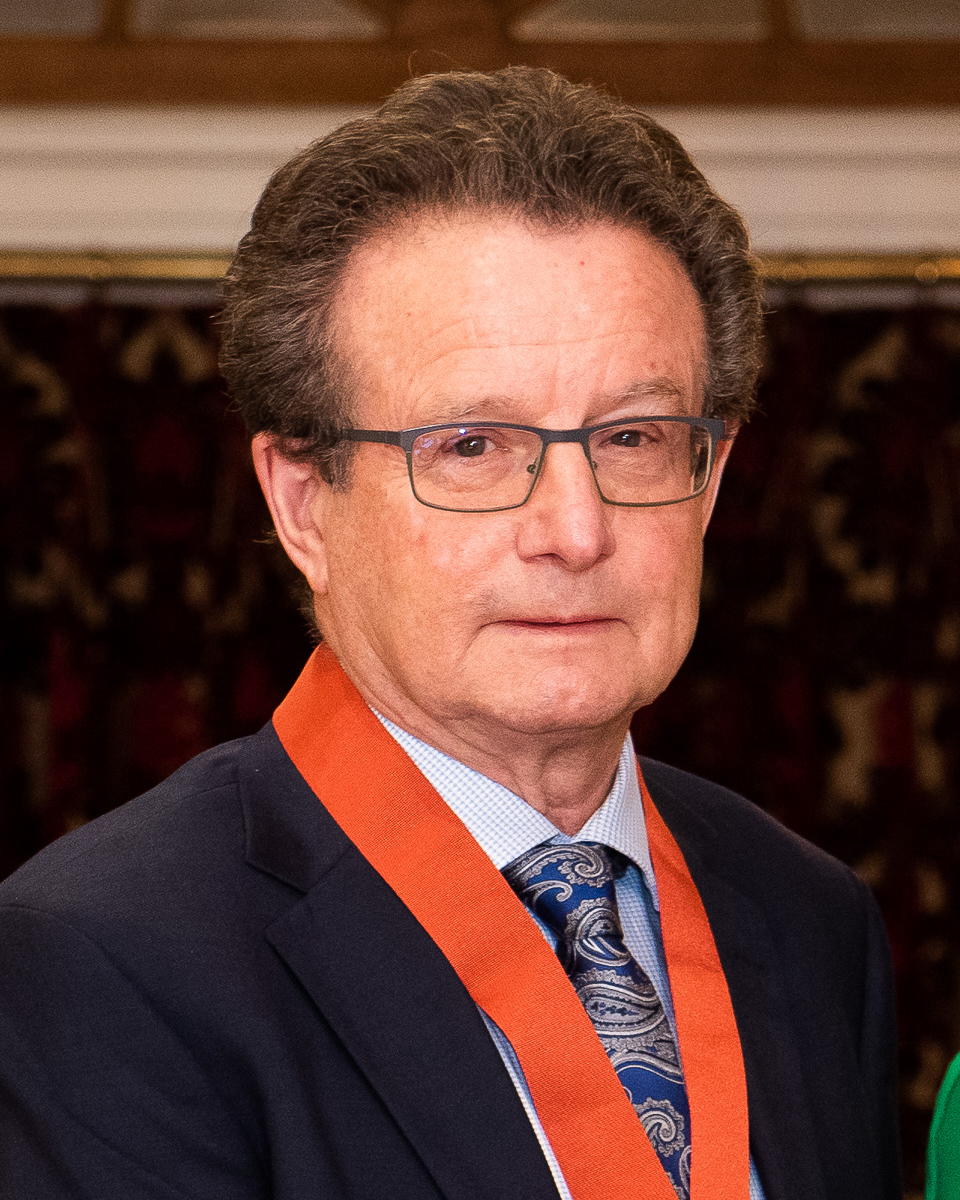
Charles Eason

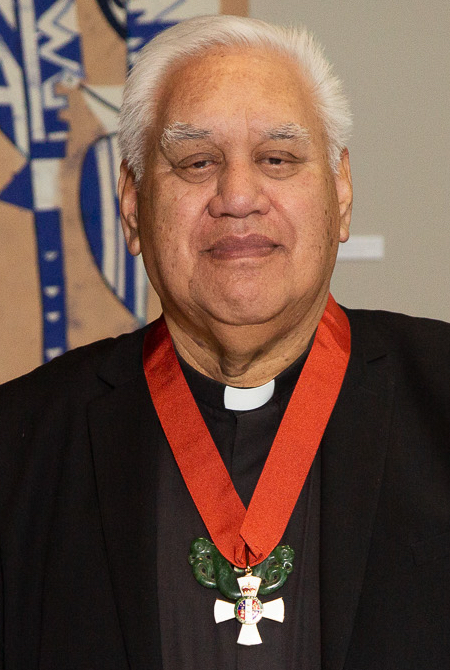
John Marsden

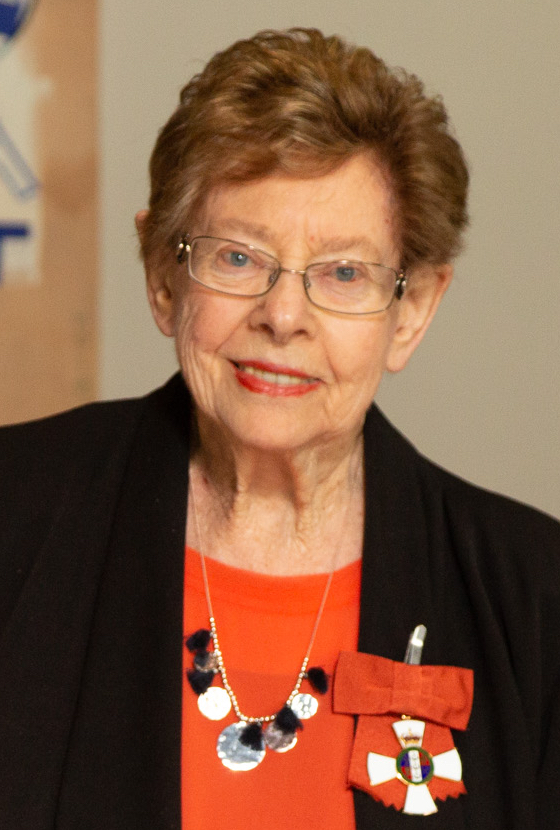
Jane Prichard

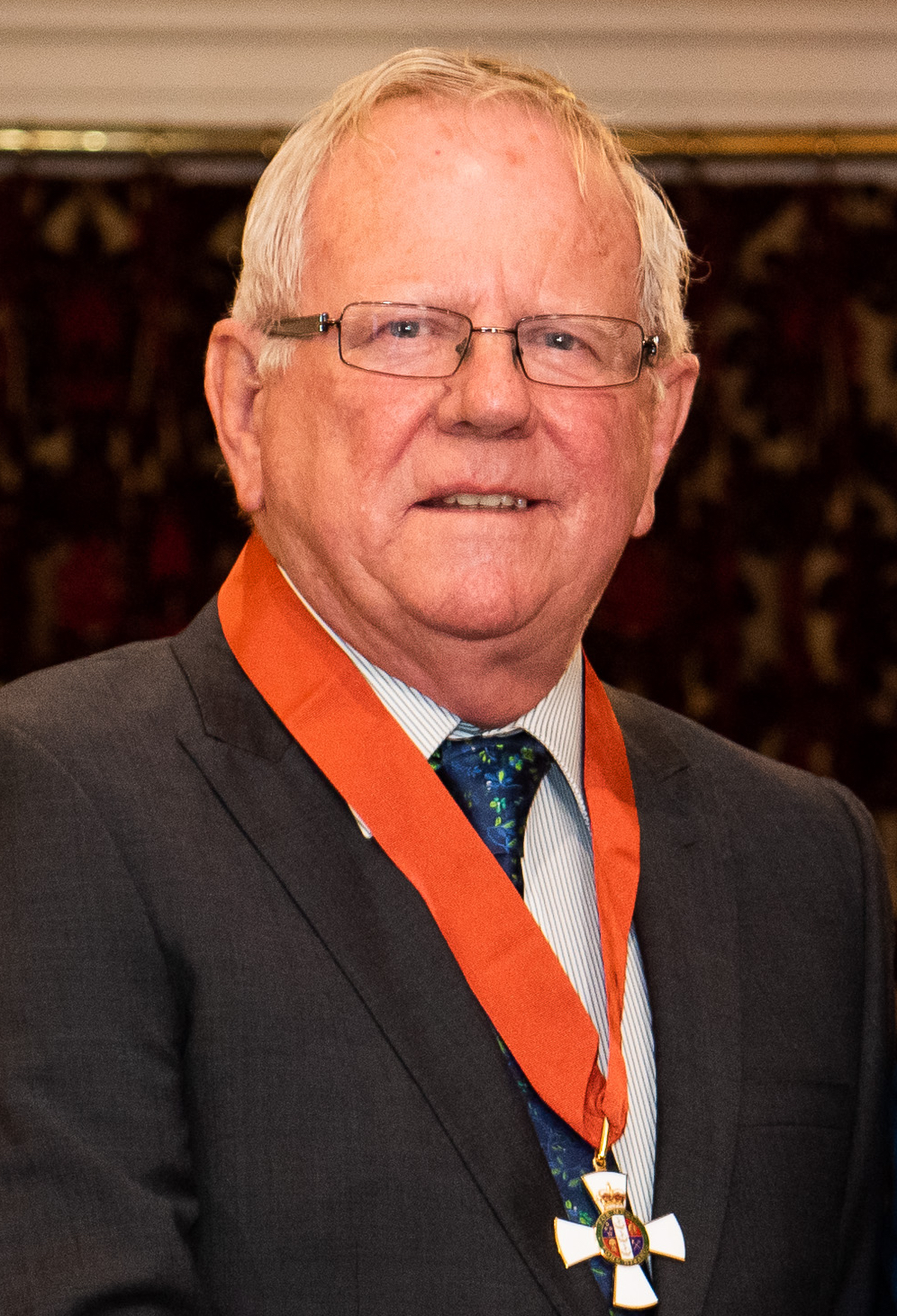
Ewan Smith

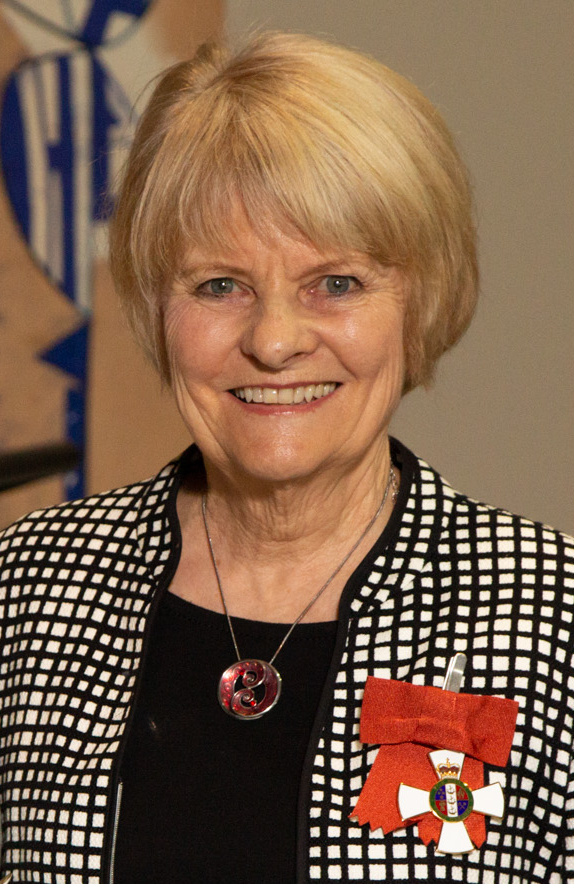
Susan St John

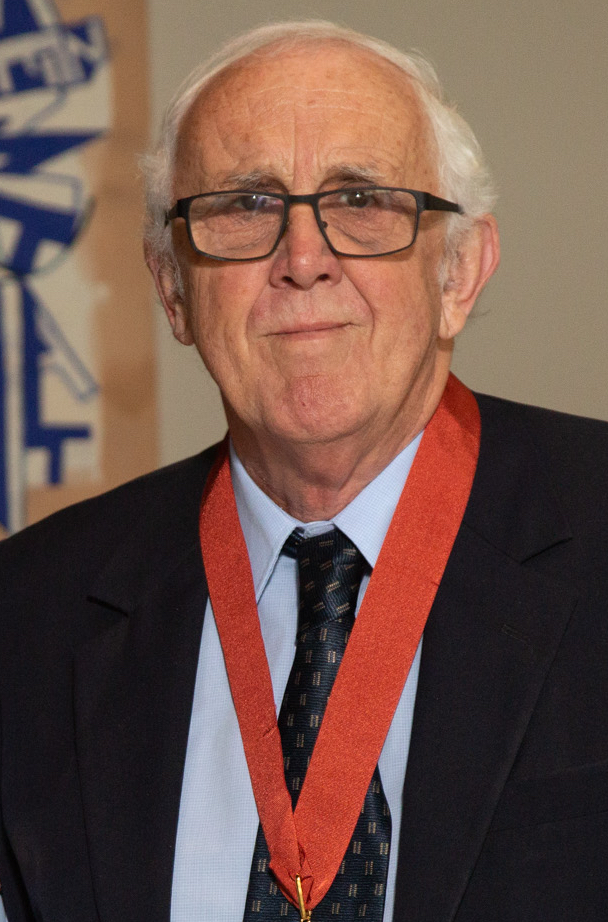
Gary Taylor

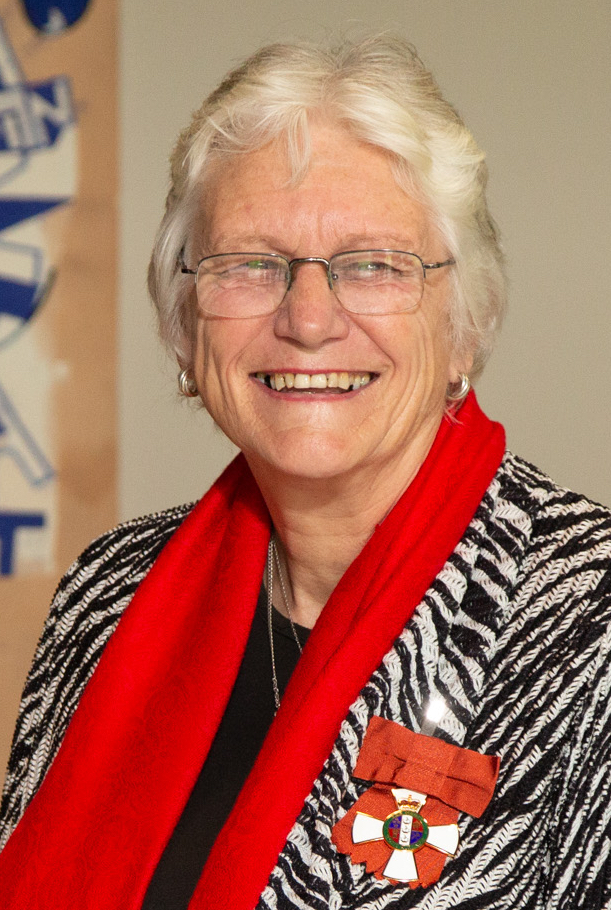
Yvonne Willering

=== Officer (ONZM) ===
- Arthur Robert Ashan Amputch – of Auckland. For services to engineering.
- Beryl Jean Anderson – of Porirua. For services to women.
- Dorothea Ashbridge – of Auckland. For services to ballet.
- Kenneth Charles Clearwater – of Kaiapoi. For services to male survivors of sexual abuse.
- Jeffrey Edward Connell – of Nelson. For services to conservation.
- Dr Candy Louise Ramarihi Hera Cox – of Rotorua. For services to health, particularly suicide prevention.
- David John Gapes – of Auckland. For services to broadcasting.
- Major General Peter Te Aroha Emile Kelly MNZM – of Wellington. For services to the New Zealand Defence Force.
- Michael King – of Auckland. For services to mental health awareness and suicide prevention. (Note: In June 2021, King returned his medal to the government as a protest action. His resignation was accepted by the Queen, who directed that King's appointment as an Officer of the New Zealand Order of Merit be cancelled and annulled.)
- Ivan Kwok – of Wellington. For services to the State.
- Professor Charles Ninian McGhee – of Auckland. For services to ophthalmology.
- Gordon William McLauchlan – of Auckland. For services to historical research.
- Dr Marie Claire McLintock – of Auckland. For services to haematology and obstetrics.
- Rodney Bruce Morris – of Dunedin. For services to documentary filmmaking, natural history and conservation.
- Cletus Maanu Paul JP – of Whakatāne. For services to Māori.
- Dr Christine Mary Roke – of Auckland. For services to sexual and reproductive health.
- Dr Lynn Christine Sadler – of Auckland. For services to maternal and perinatal health.
- Donald Hewitt Thompson – of Wānaka. For services to people with intellectual disabilities.
- David Geoffrey Trubridge – of Havelock North. For services to design.
- Mafaufau Sita Tua MNZM – of Auckland. For services to youth, boxing and the community.
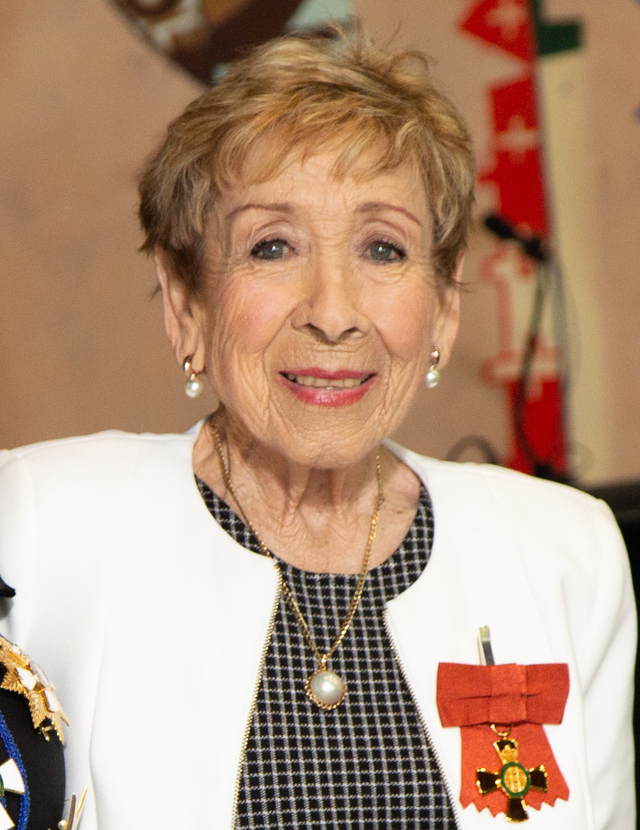
Dorothea Ashbridge

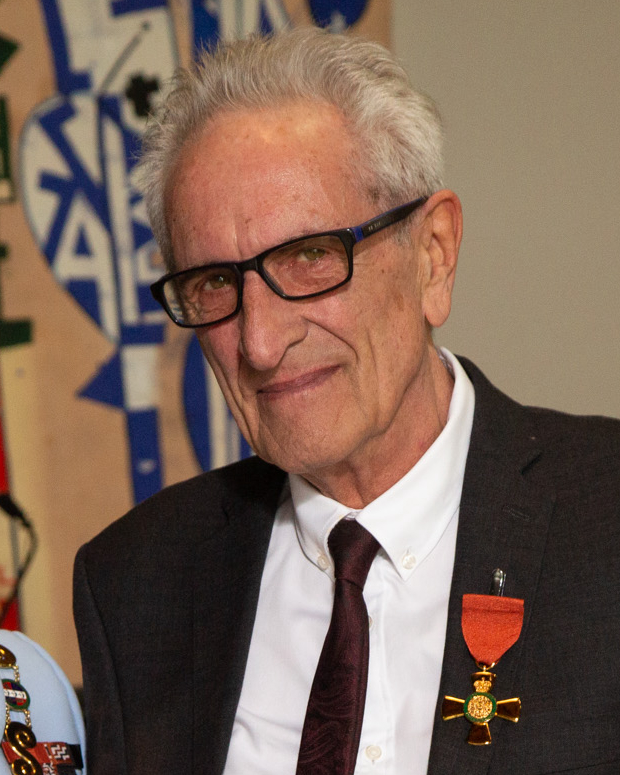
David Gapes

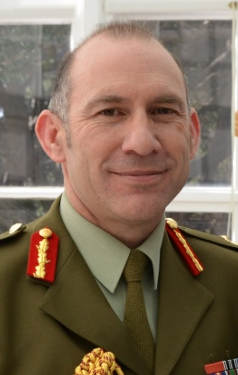
Peter Kelly

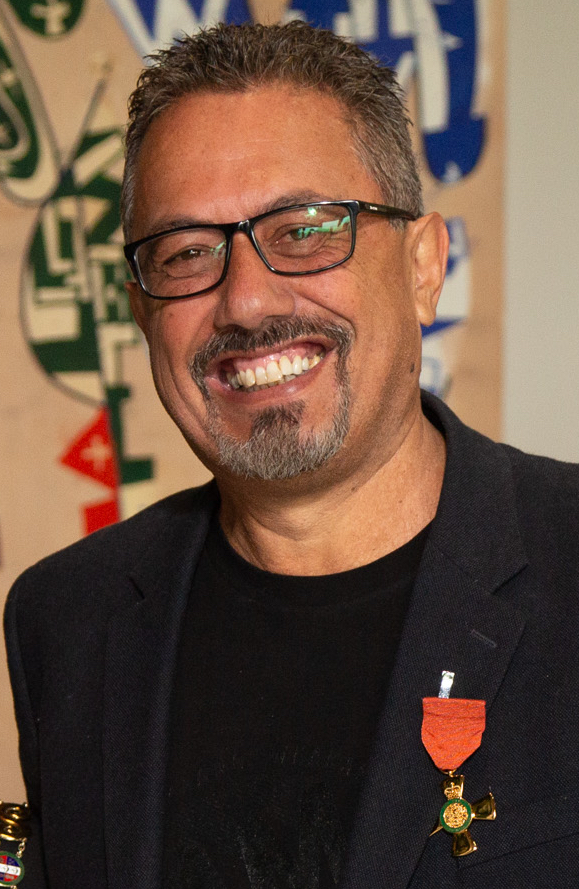
Mike King

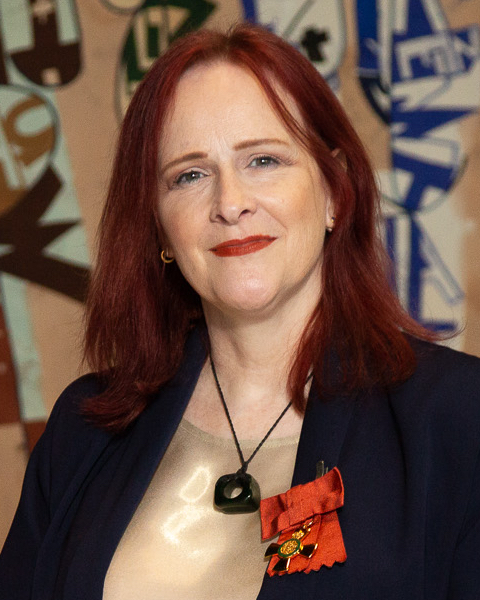
Claire McLintock

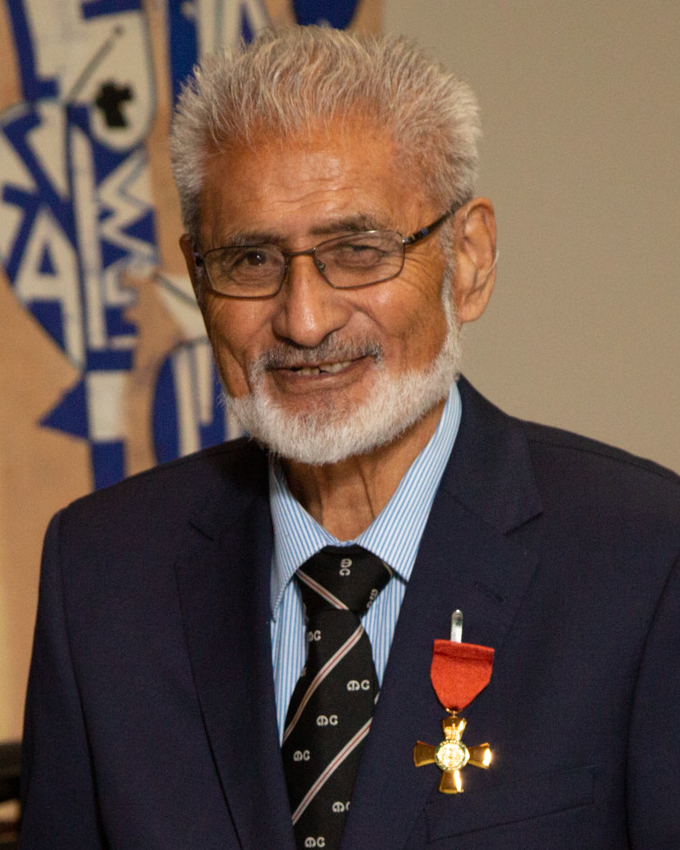
Maanu Paul

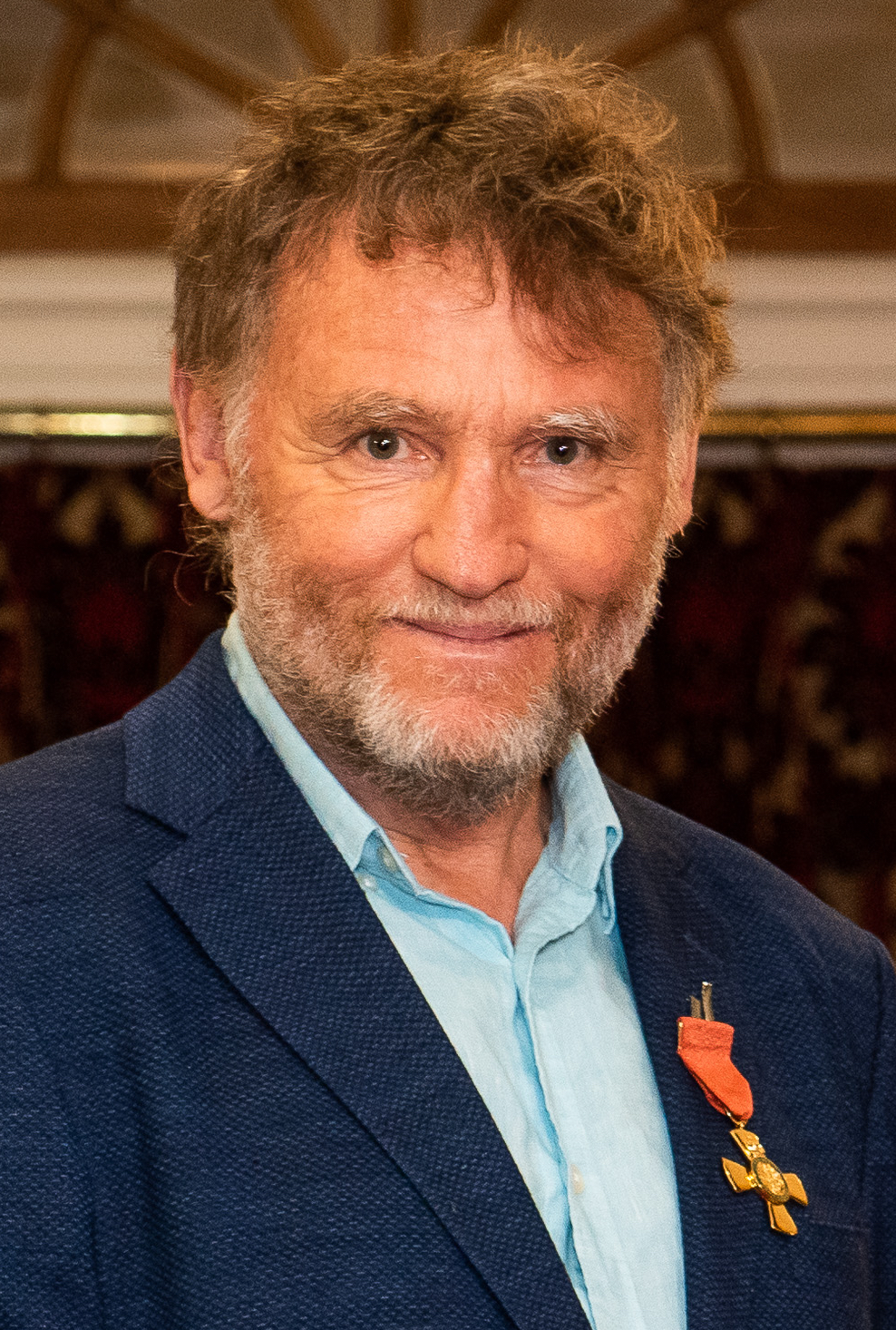
David Trubridge

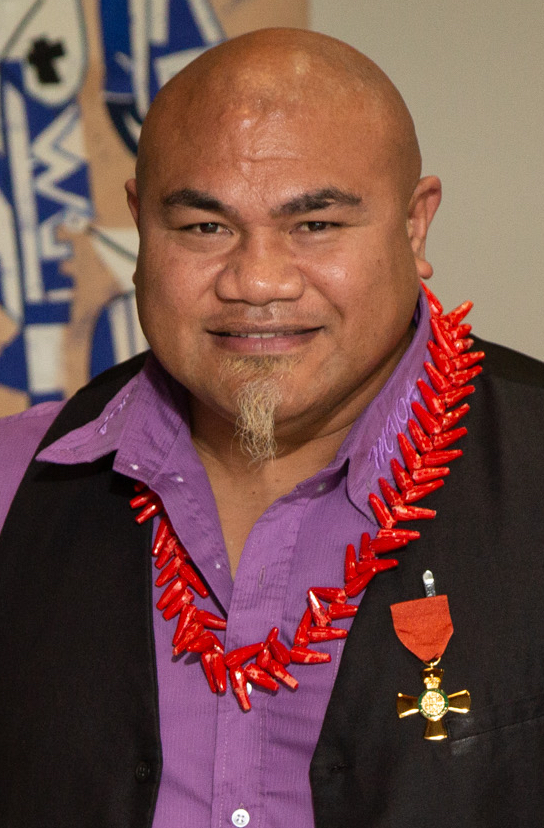
David Tua

=== Member (MNZM) ===
- Senior Sergeant Bruce Robert Adams – of Wellington. For services to the New Zealand Police and the community.
- Claire Elizabeth Aitken – of Dunedin. For services to rehabilitative programmes.
- Edith Amituanai – of Auckland. For services to photography and the community.
- Phylesha Brown-Acton – of Auckland. For services to the Pacific and LGBTQI+ communities.
- Ruth Busch – of Auckland. For services to domestic violence prevention and the State.
- Ian William Coard – of Riverton. For services to the Coastguard.
- Margaret Gwenneth Cook – of Invercargill. For services to the community.
- Dr Fiona May Cram – of Auckland. For services to Māori health and education.
- Dr Robert John Mackay Crawford – of Hanmer Springs. For services to mental health and addiction services.
- Patricia Jane Dance – of Featherston. For services to the New Zealand Kennel Club.
- James Columba Davis – of Blenheim. For services to Māori art, the Catholic Church and the community.
- Tane Craig Davis – of Invercargill. For services to conservation.
- Rachael Kathleen Dean – of Masterton. For services to governance and the community.
- Allison Muriel Dobbie – of Auckland. For services to library and information management and the arts.
- Jan Elizabeth Dowland – of Wellington. For services to people with intellectual disabilities.
- Dr Hinemoa Elder – of Auckland. For services to psychiatry and Māori.
- Tunumafono Avaula Colenso Fa'amoe – of Auckland. For services to the Pacific community and health.
- Marie Jane Fitzpatrick – of Wellington. For services to the community.
- Susan Leigh Gardiner – of Auckland. For services to the arts.
- Dr Briar Elizabeth Roycroft Gordon – of Wellington. For services to the law and the State.
- Laurence Roy Gordon – of Kaitaia. For services to wildlife conservation.
- Sarah Hirini – of Papamoa. For services to rugby.
- Faye Claire James – of Palmerston North. For services to the New Zealand Cancer Society.
- Stephanie Patricia Johnson – of Auckland. For services to literature.
- Janet Joye Kelly – of Motueka. For services to education.
- Yvonne Margaret Loader – of Christchurch. For services to the sport of gliding.
- Allyson Sarah Lock – of Masterton. For services to people with rare health disorders.
- Robyn Jane Malcolm – of Auckland. For services to television and theatre.
- Dr Jacqueline Diane Miller – of Rotorua. For services to women and the State.
- Rose Mary Hine Wairangi Morgan – of Hamilton. For services to victim support.
- Jonathan William Mosen – of Wellington. For services to the blind community.
- Nicole Dione Murray – of Wellington. For services to the community.
- Shila Nair – of Auckland. For services to ethnic communities and women.
- Neville Ernest Phillips – of Hāwera. For services to youth.
- Ewen Robert Pirie – of Wyndham. For services to clay target shooting.
- Pango Mary-Anne Pitman – of Napier. For services to Māori and family violence prevention.
- Professor Devon Leigh Logan Polaschek – of Hamilton. For services to criminal psychology.
- Anjum Rahman – of Hamilton. For services to ethnic communities and women.
- John Spencer Russell – of Porirua. For services to education.
- Naomi Kathleen Shaw – of Lower Hutt. For services to softball.
- Evan Trevor Smith – of Christchurch. For services to the community.
- Professor Karen Alison Smith – of Wellington. For services to education and volunteering.
- Celia Ann Stewart – of Christchurch. For services to music education.
- Linda Dawn Surtees – of Lower Hutt. For services to children and the State.
- Laine Leata Tipi JP – of Auckland. For services to Pacific communities and education.
- Janice Ann Tofia – of Dunedin. For services to education.
- Beverley Turner – of Auckland. For services to women, particularly Pacific women.
- Bryan Alexander Waddle – of Porirua. For services as a sports broadcaster.
- Dr Benjamin Williams – of Porirua. For services to theology and the community.
- Nicola Jean Williams – of Taupō. For services to arts governance.
- Dr Andrea Maxine Wilson – of Paraparaumu. For services to wildlife conservation.
- Margaret Alison Wilson – of Auckland. For services to women.
- Sally Ann Wilson – of Auckland. For services to midwifery.
- Philippa Anne Evelyn Wright – of Clive. For services to the wool industry and sustainability.
- Susan Jean Wynyard – of Auckland. For services to midwifery.
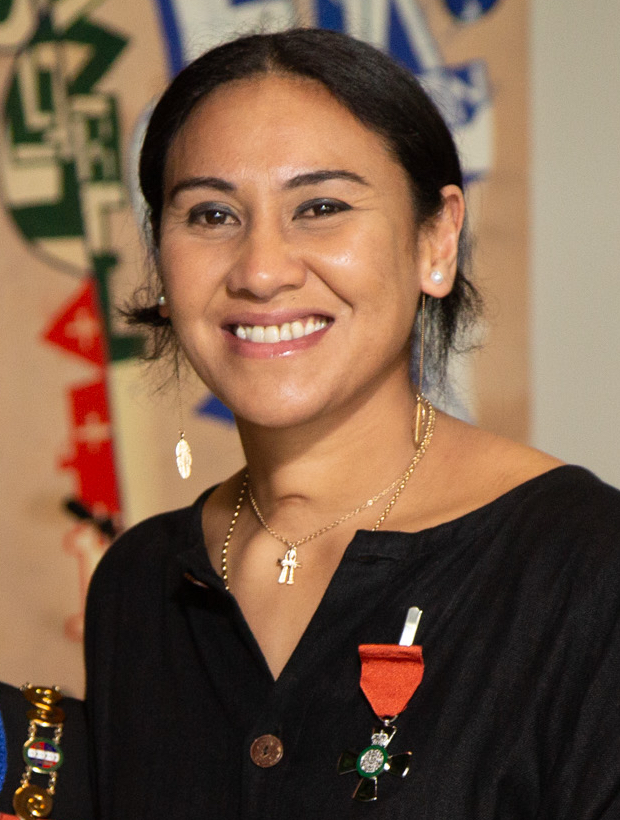
Edith Amituanai

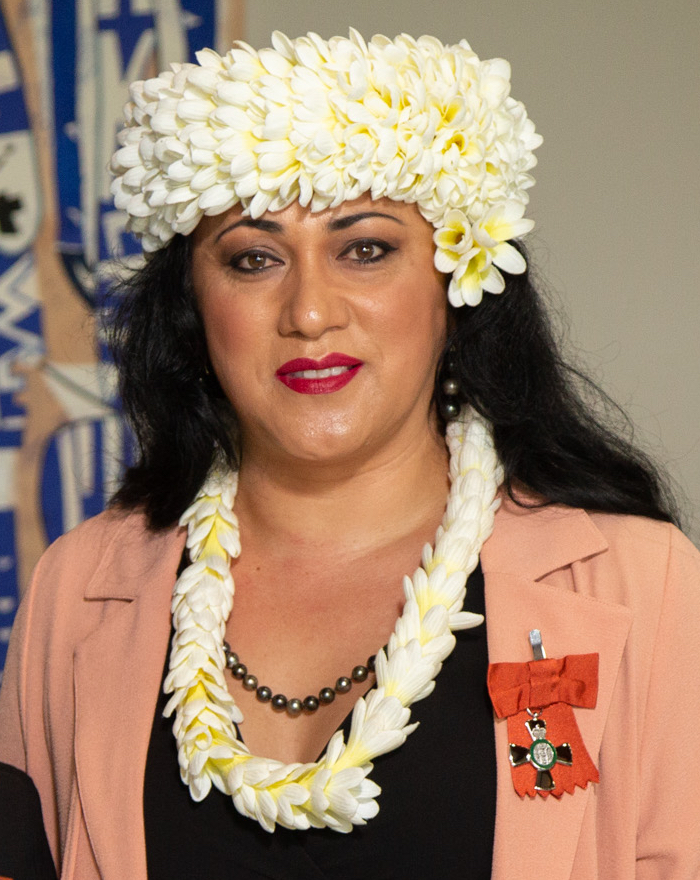
Phylesha Brown-Acton

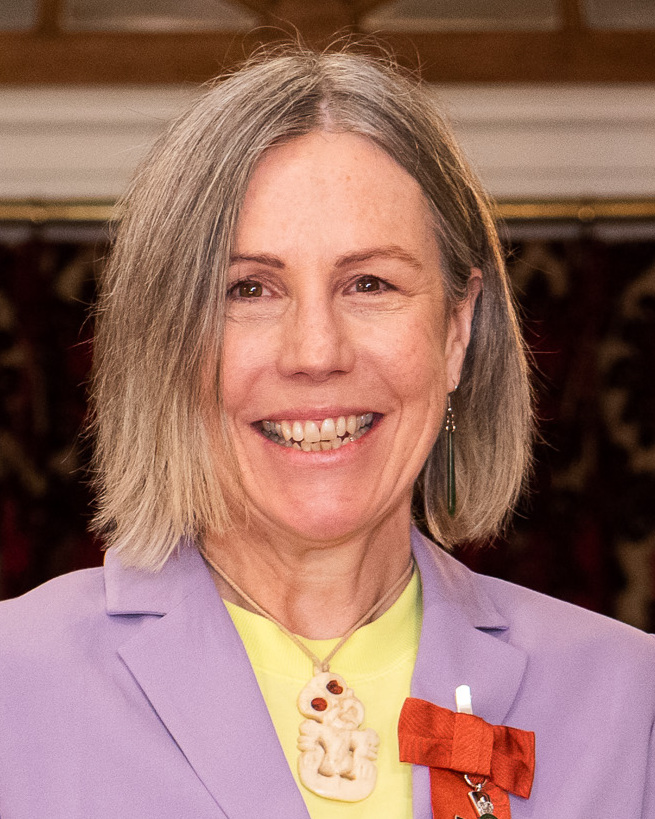
Fiona Cram

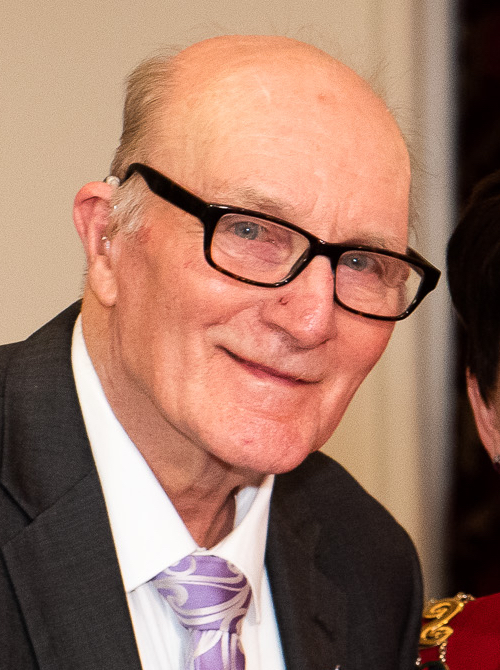
Robert Crawford

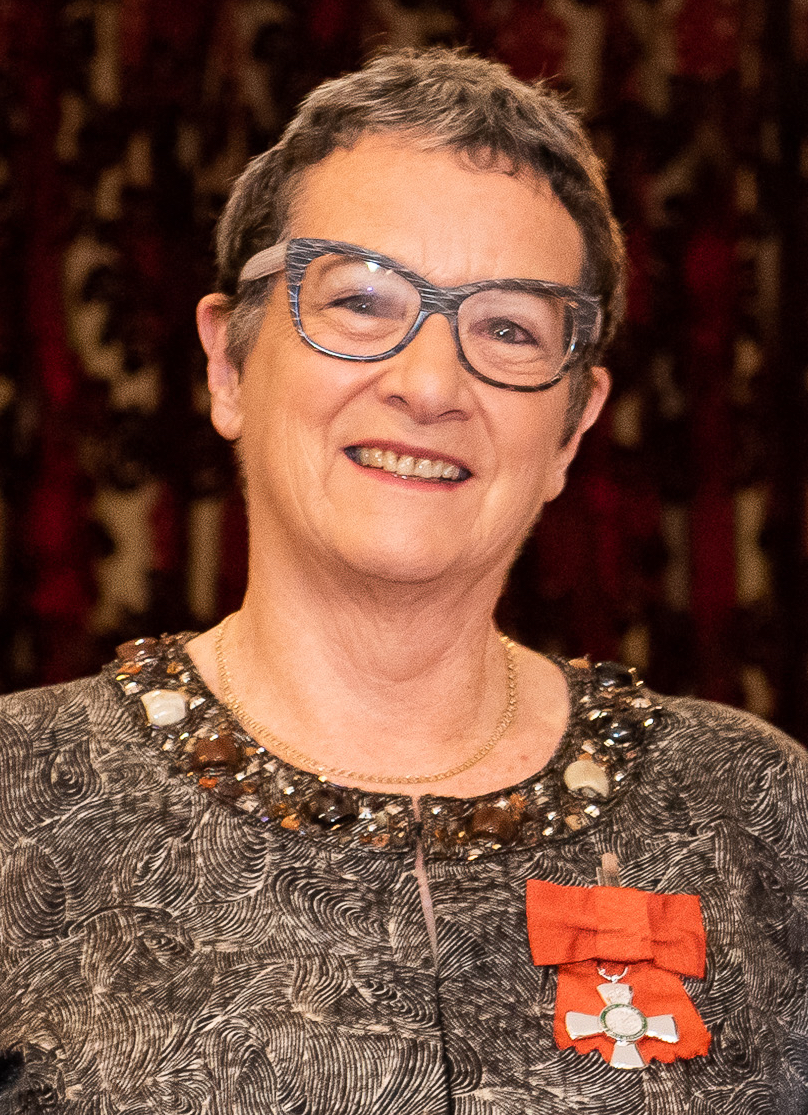
Allison Dobbie

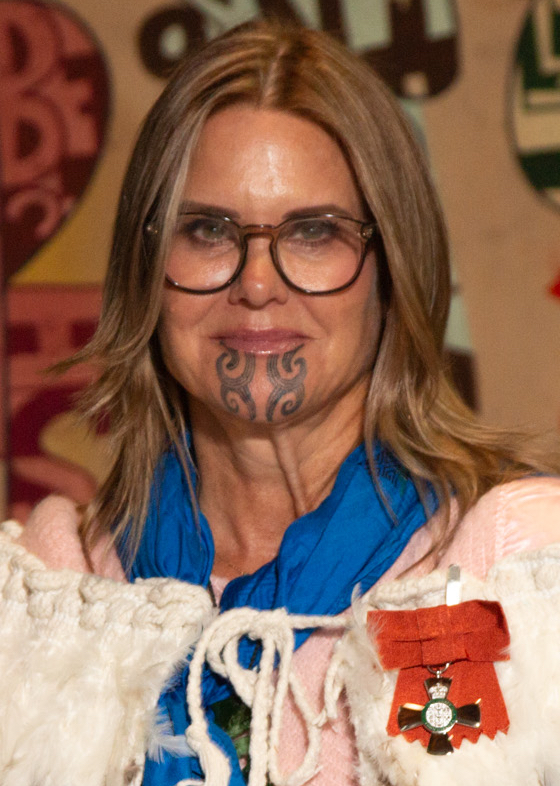
Hinemoa Elder

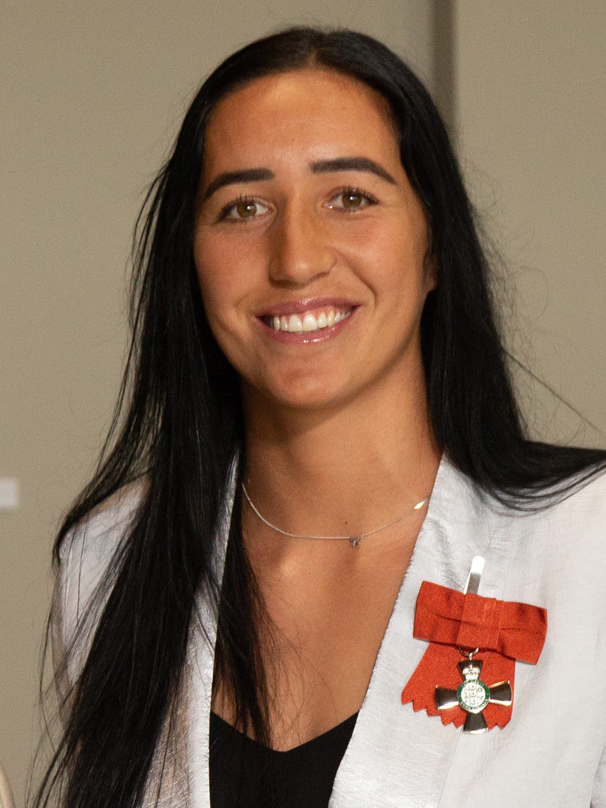
Sarah Hirini

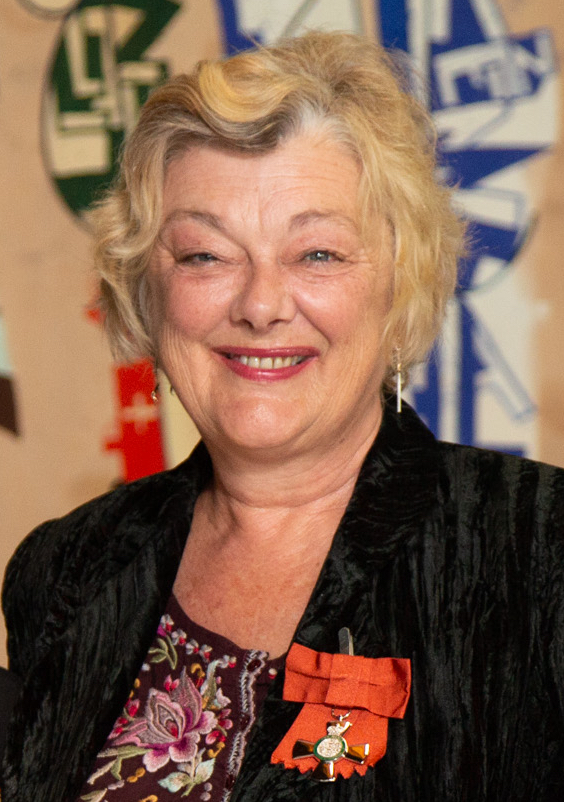
Stephanie Johnson

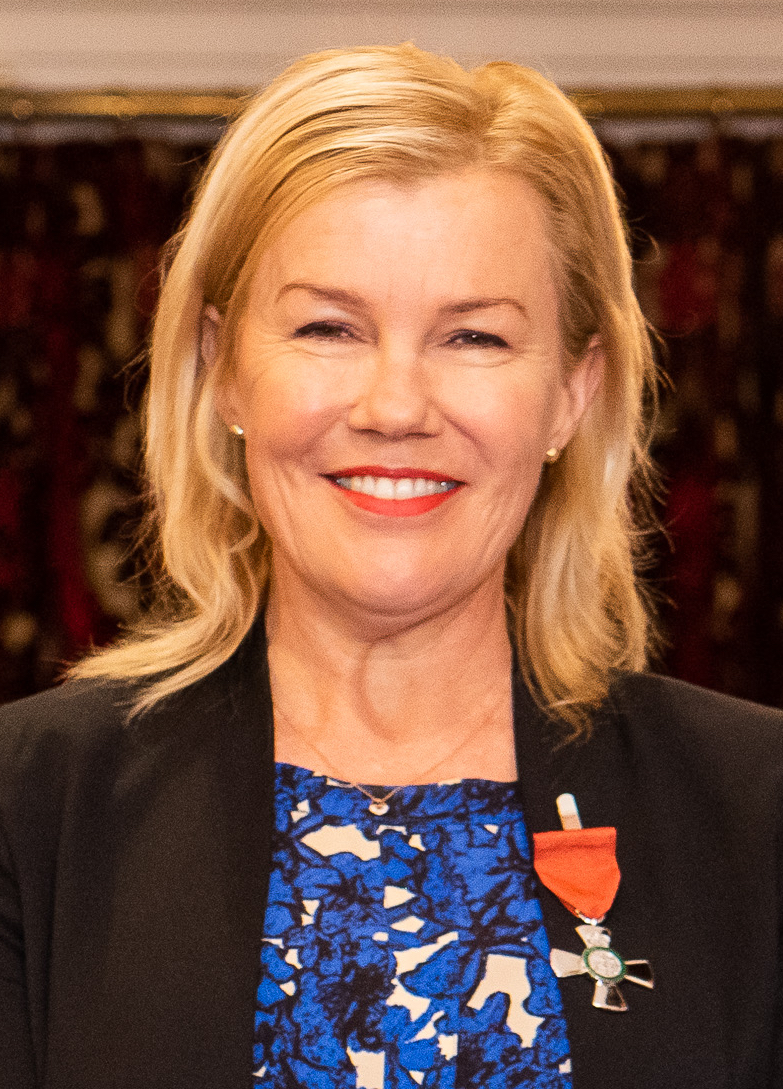
Robyn Malcolm

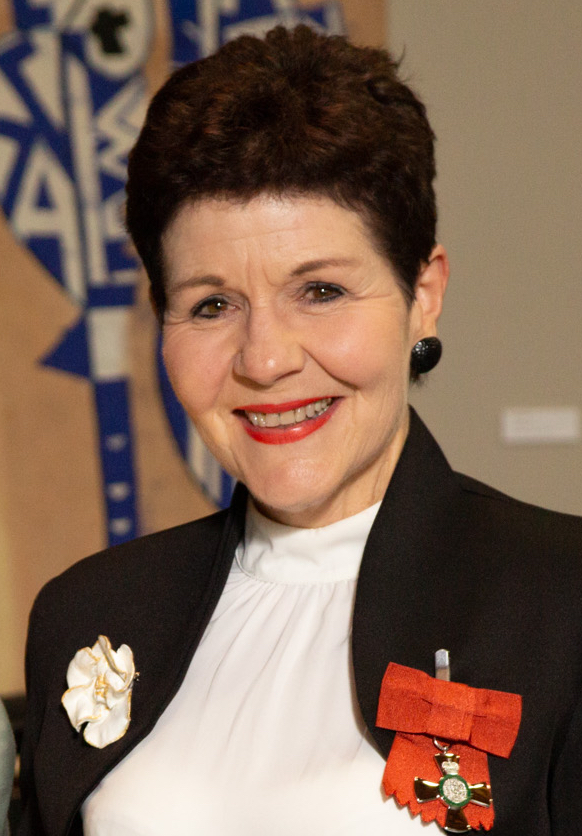
Jackie Miller

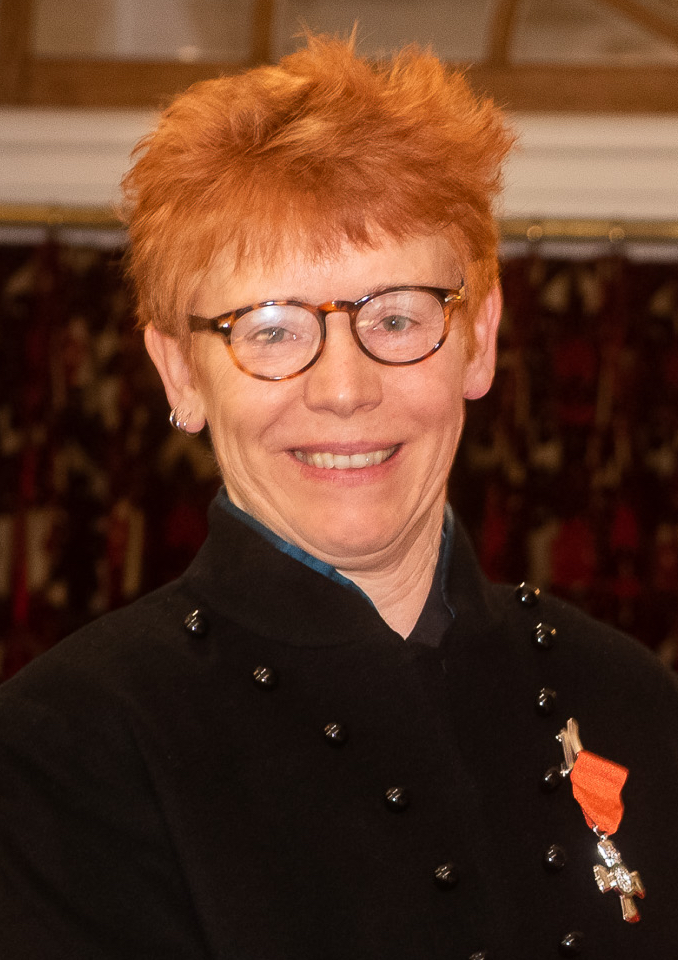
Devon Polaschek

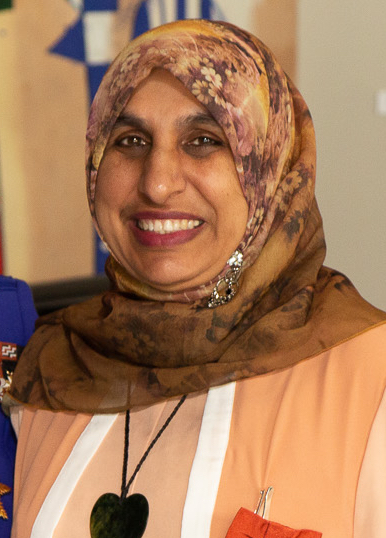
Anjum Rahman

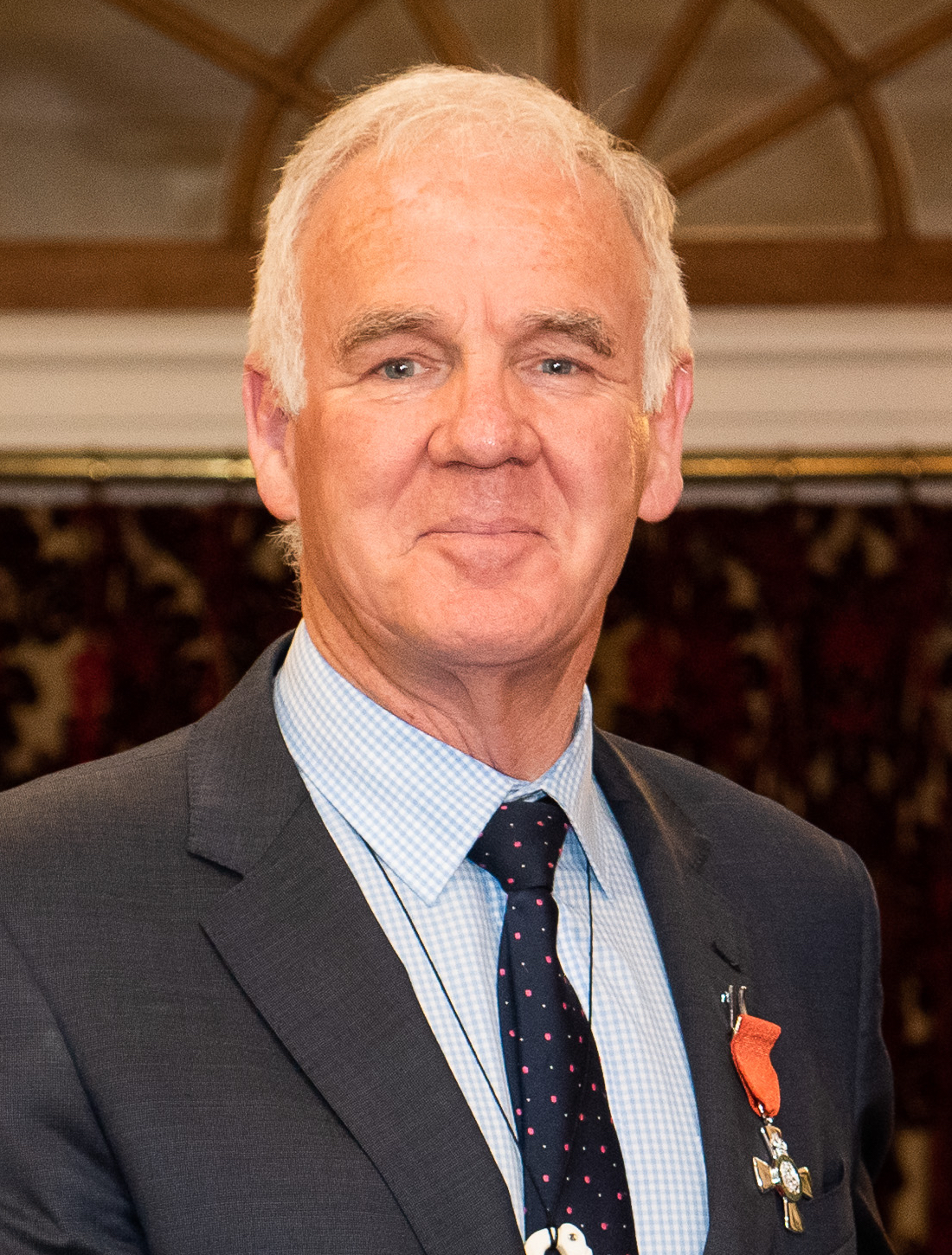
John Russell

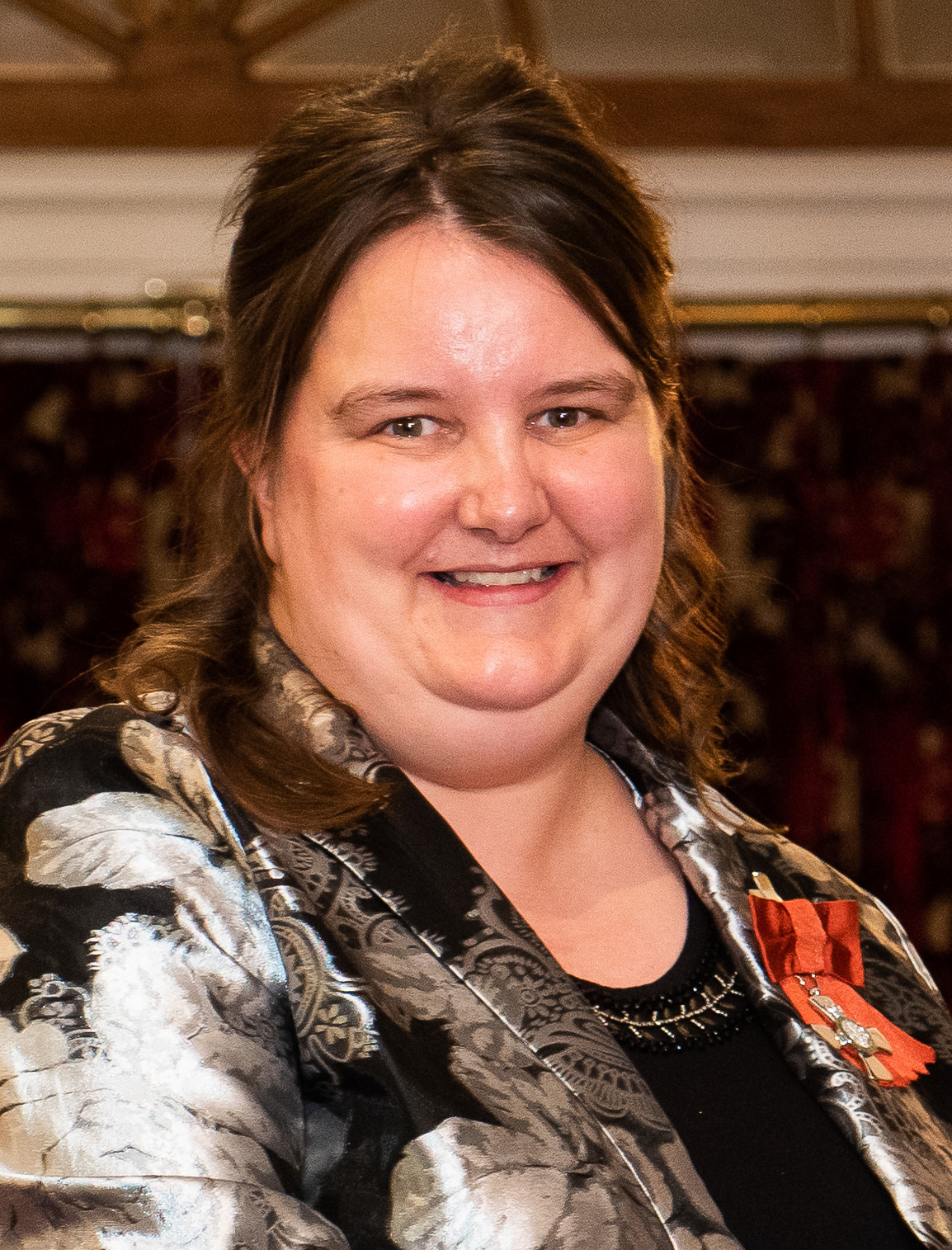
Karen Smith

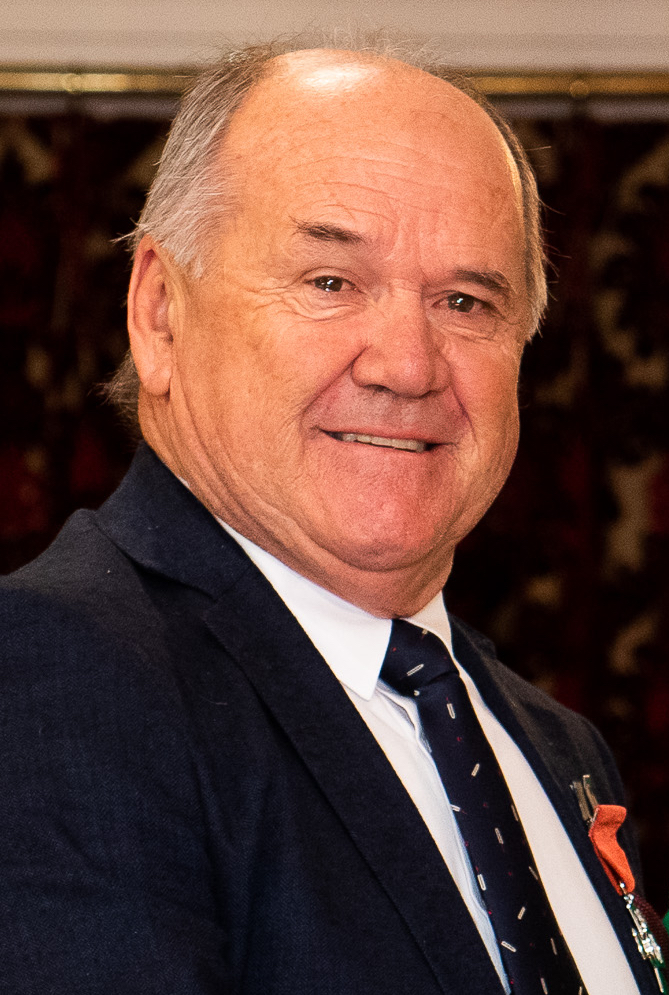
Bryan Waddle

== Companion of the Queen's Service Order (QSO) ==
- Helene Elizabeth Quilter – of Wellington. For services to the State.
- Patricia Anne Seymour OBE – of Gisborne. For services to local government and the community.
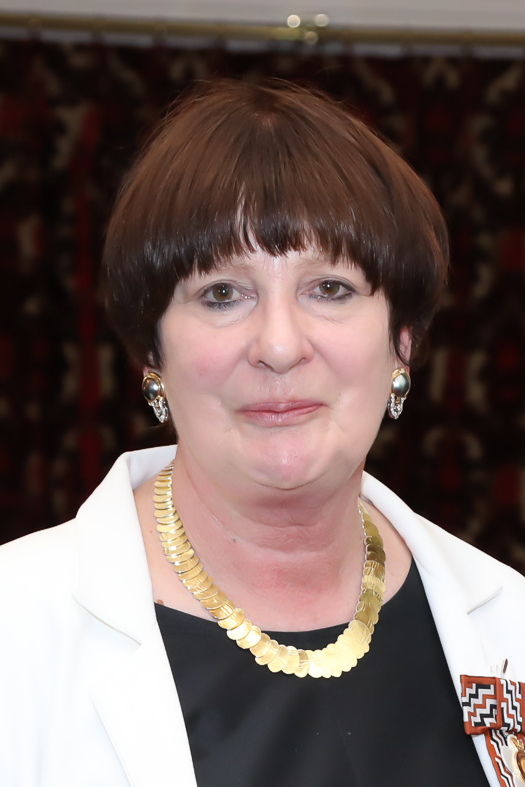
Helene Quilter

== Queen's Service Medal (QSM) ==
- Gary Mathew Aitken JP – of Auckland. For services to Fire and Emergency New Zealand and the community.
- Roger Alexander – of Napier. For services to conservation and the community.
- Pare Anderson – of Auckland. For services to Māori language education.
- Tiwana Riwai Aranui – of Napier. For services to Māori and education.
- Robert William Bartley – of Whanganui. For services to the community.
- Joanna Margaret Beetham – of Masterton. For services to the community and the arts.
- Adrienne Elizabeth Begg – of Darfield. For services to sport and the community.
- Maree Helen Bernasconi – of Auckland. For services to netball.
- Andrew Paul Bicknell – of Wellington. For services to music.
- Eric William Bodell – of Ashhurst. For services to broadcasting.
- Janferié Bryce-Chapman JP – of Auckland. For services to seniors.
- Roy James Buckley – of Auckland. For services to the craft of woodturning.
- Christine Carol Bygrave – of Mangawhai Heads. For services to the community.
- Fraser Logan Cameron – of Ōpōtiki. For services to the community and theatre.
- Diane Marcelle Celliers – of Auckland. For services to the community.
- Dorothy May Charles – of Murchison. For services to the community.
- Shirley Lorraine Christie JP – of Whanganui. For services to the community.
- Garth William Cowley – of Auckland. For services to Fire and Emergency New Zealand and the community.
- Peter Antony Cox – of Christchurch. For services to sport, particularly hockey.
- Mervyn John Cranefield – of Dunedin. For services to Scouting and the community.
- Carol Anne Dickson – of Auckland. For services to the community.
- Bronwyn Tracey Dobson – of Whakatāne. For services to Fire and Emergency New Zealand and the community.
- Edward Colban Fawcett – of Masterton. For services to the sport of woodchopping.
- Fala Haulangi – of Auckland. For services to the Pacific community and workers' rights.
- Leonard Russell Hoggard – of Auckland. For services to athletics.
- Valmai Joyce Horlor – of Christchurch. For services to the community.
- Anne Lorraine Howell – of Auckland. For services to the community and education.
- Neville Thomas Jack – of Hamilton. For services to the community.
- Sydney Tamou Kershaw – of Pātea. For services to Māori performing arts and the community.
- Joyce-Rewa Kolk – of Tuatapere. For services to conservation.
- Bak Fong Lee – of Oamaru. For services to horticulture and the community.
- Dugald Ian Dunlop MacTavish – of Palmerston. For services to conservation and the environment.
- Sagaa Malua – of Auckland. For services to the Tuvaluan community.
- Christopher Bailey Marjoribanks JP – of Ōhope. For services to youth and the community.
- Deborah Jane Martin – of Nelson. For services to conservation.
- Alastair Gordon Mason – of Auckland. For services to philanthropy and the community.
- Tina Mataiti – of Auckland. For services to the Pacific community and health.
- Roderick Andrew McLeay – of Auckland. For services to music and education.
- Julia Margaret Milne – of Lower Hutt. For services to the community.
- Josephine Hinehou Mortensen JP – of Ōpōtiki. For services to Māori and the arts.
- Martyn John Norrie – of Rotorua. For services to the community.
- Gary Joseph O'Brien – of Levin. For services to youth and the community.
- Kathryn Jane Orbell – of Hamilton. For services to music.
- Marjorie Elizabeth Orwin – of Christchurch. For services to the community.
- Lynette Pellow – of Auckland. For services to netball.
- Lois Lee Perry – of Auckland. For services to art and governance.
- Hilda Lorraine Mary Pipes – of Auckland. For services to the community.
- Dawn Frances Preston-Thomas JP – of Auckland. For services to counselling and victim support.
- Lyndsay Neill Price QFSM JP – of Kaiapoi. For services to the community.
- Lyndsay Arthur Rackley – of Dunedin. For services to broadcasting.
- Evelyn Nukumai-te-Mangai Ratima – of Hastings. For services to Māori and the community.
- Philip Ivan Redmond – of Christchurch. For services to the community.
- Graeme William Reid – of Christchurch. For services to mental health support.
- Kathryn Lesley Reid – of Christchurch. For services to palliative care.
- Michael George Rutherford – of Oxford. For services to philanthropy and the community.
- Ernest Patrick Sansom – of Auckland. For services to the community and engineering.
- Ann-Marie Searle – of Invercargill. For services to badminton and the community.
- Mupopo Siaosi JP – of Auckland. For services to health and the Pacific community.
- Martin Sloman – of Paraparaumu. For services to mental health.
- Christine Puarata Smith – of Auckland. For services to Māori art.
- Edith Carolyn Smith – of Ashburton. For services to conservation.
- Reverend Tui Fakafotu Sopoaga – of Porirua. For services to the Tokelauan community.
- Grant Bruce Stevenson – of Ōtaki. For services to the arts.
- Rae Elizabeth Storey – of Auckland. For services to folk dancing and the arts.
- Bryan Edward Styles – of Carterton. For services to the United Fire Brigades Association and the community.
- Margaret Joan Swinburn – of Greymouth. For services to athletics.
- Alan Charles Tapp – of Milton. For services to Fire and Emergency New Zealand and the community.
- Rose Mary Mailee Kuluimotu Tauetule – of Auckland. For services to women and the Niuean community.
- Elizabeth Barbara Thomas – of Oxford. For services to equestrian sports and the community.
- Juanita Whitiaera Timutimu – of Gisborne. For services to criminal justice programmes and the community.
- Martha Mahuri Tipene – of Hāwera. For services to Māori.
- Kenneth Henry Tobin – of Hastings. For services to pipe bands.
- Vaha Tuielu – of Rotorua. For services to the Tokelauan community.
- Rachel Ada Underwood – of Wellington. For services to the community.
- Allan Leonardie Francis Va'a – of Auckland. For services to youth and sport.
- Leutu Vaovasa – of Porirua. For services to the Tokelauan community.
- Gaylene Marie Vivian – of Palmerston North. For services to family support and health.
- Nigel Edward Weeks – of Nelson. For services to music.
- Ida Willamina White – of Auckland. For services to Māori art.
- David Findon Wight – of Whitianga. For services to the community.
- Sonia Wilson – of Rotorua. For services to victim support and the community.
- Grant Albert Windsor – of Christchurch. For services to broadcasting and sport.
- Susan Maureen Winters – of Rotorua. For services to education.
- Denise Mary Veronica Wood – of New Plymouth. For services to the community.
- Peter John Woodward – of Paraparaumu. For services to the Coastguard.

Honorary

- Perenise Tapu – of Auckland. For services to education and the Samoan community
Andrew Bicknell

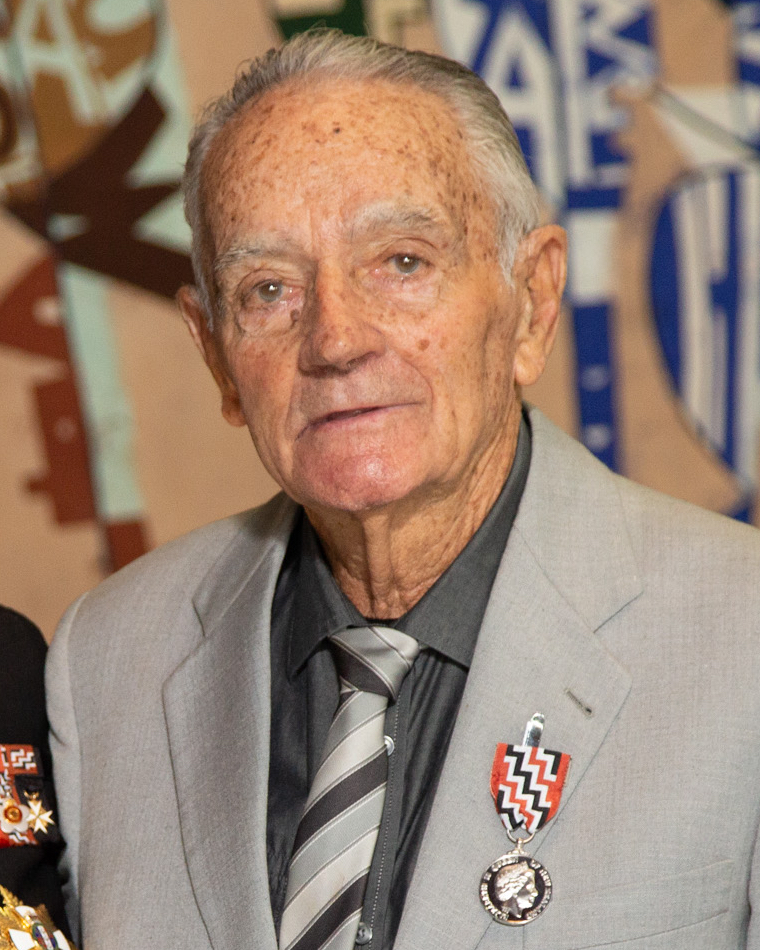
Russ Hoggard

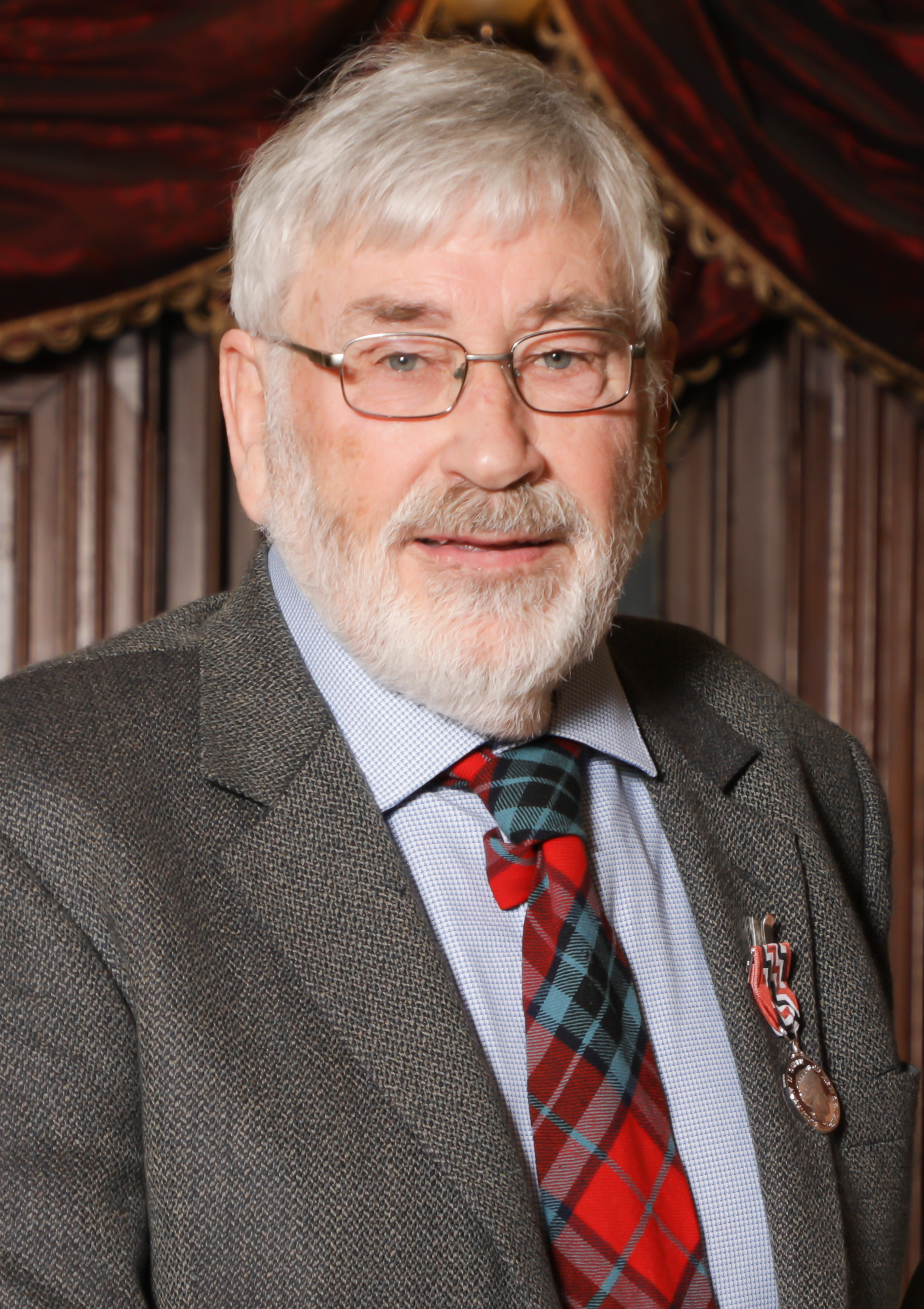
Dugald MacTavish

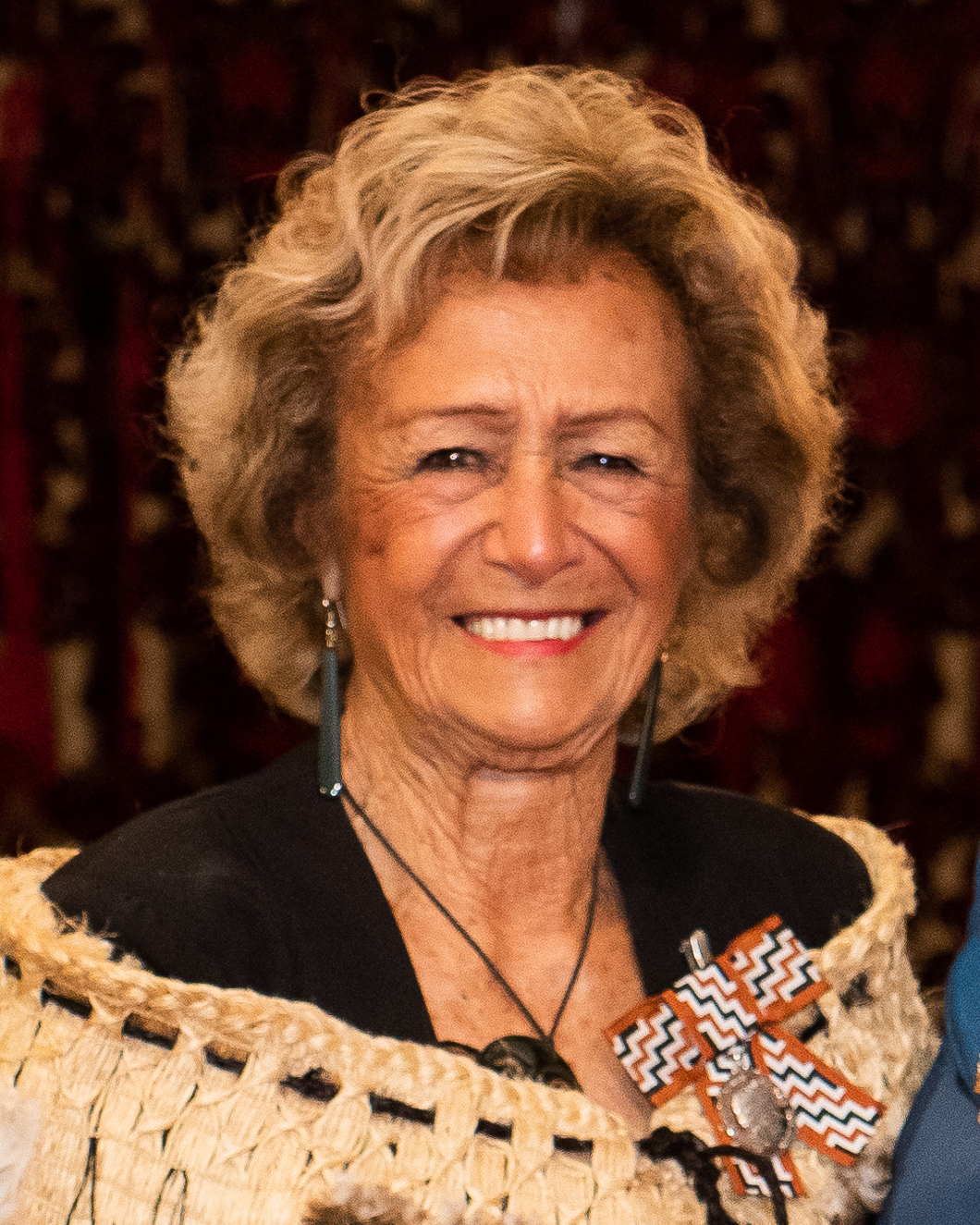
Josie Mortensen

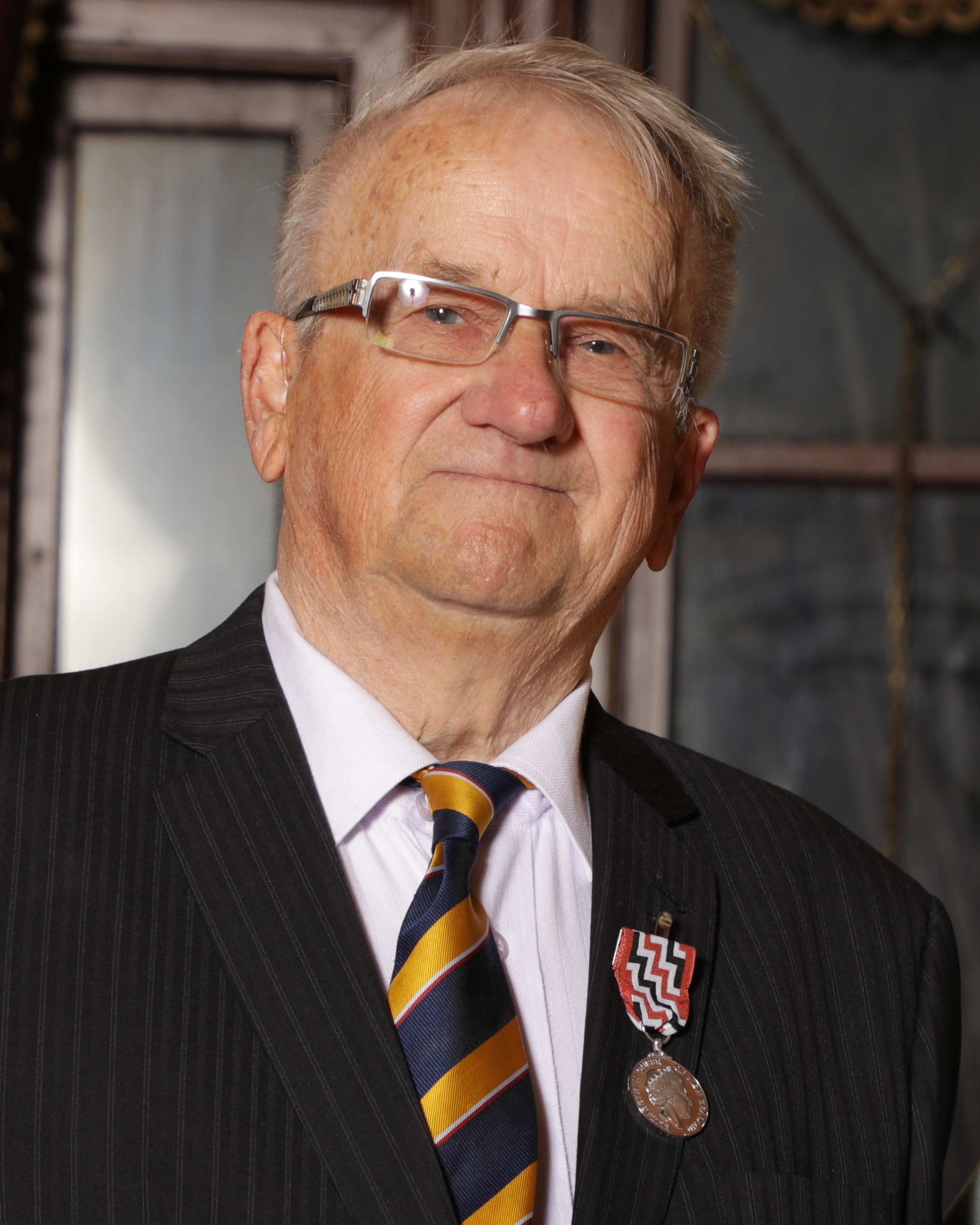
Neill Price

Lyndsay Rackley

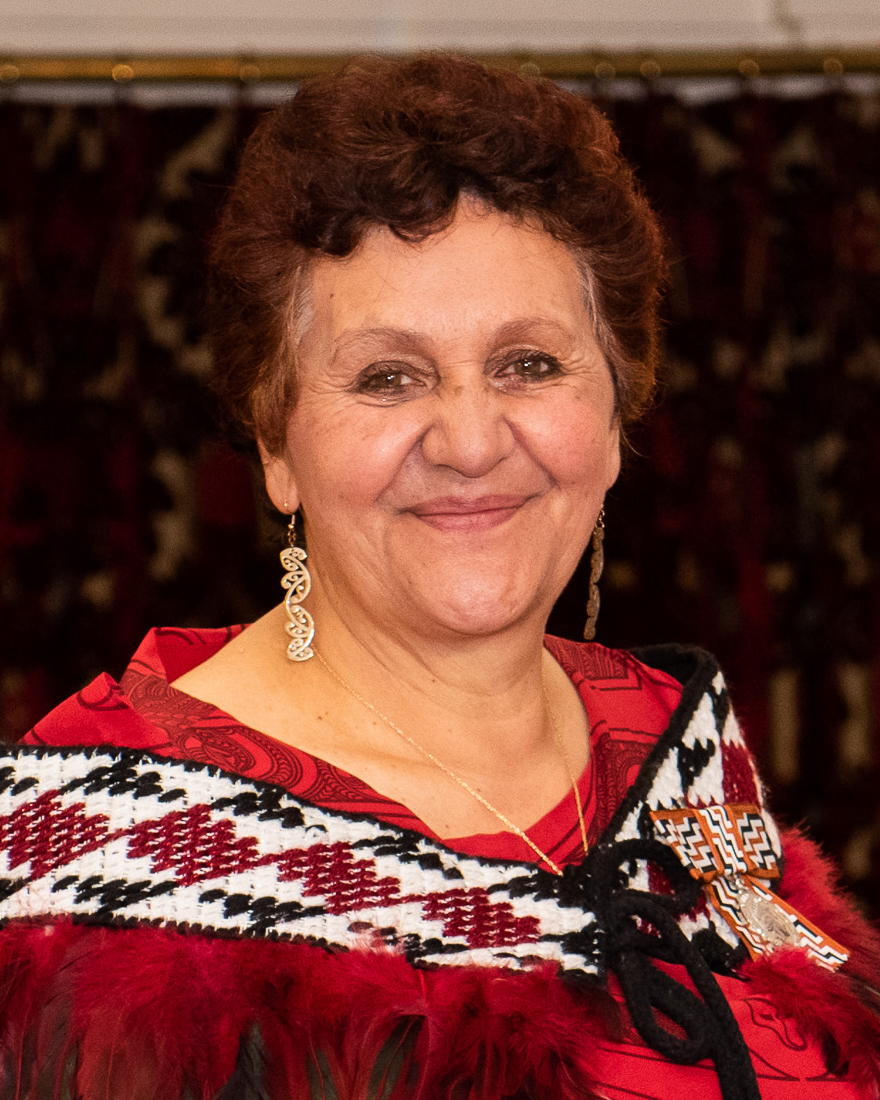
Evelyn Ratima

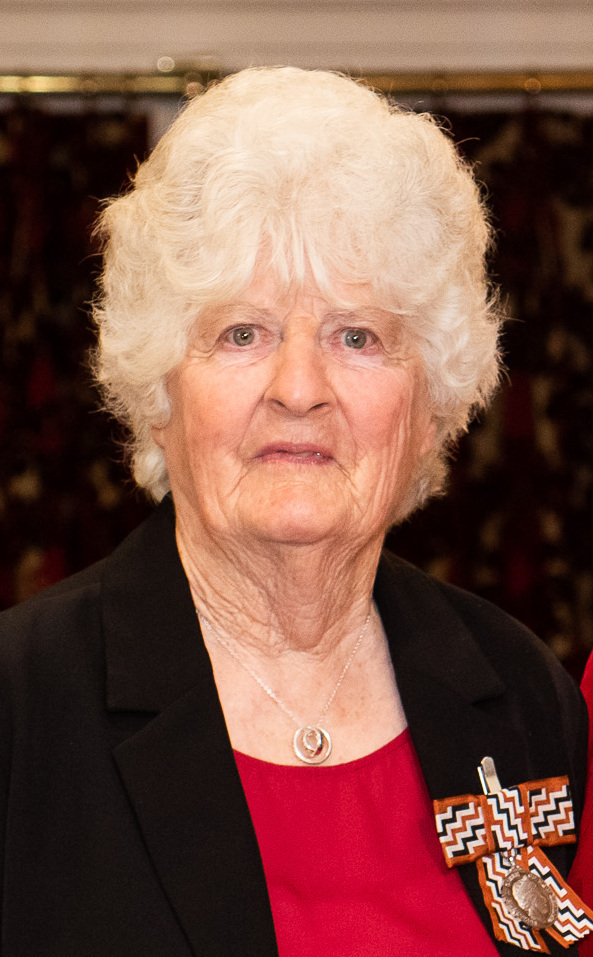
Margaret Swinburn

Ken Tobin

== New Zealand Distinguished Service Decoration (DSD) ==
- Daniel Lawrence Broughton MNZM – of Upper Hutt. For services to the New Zealand Defence Force.
- Dr Peter Rodd Hurly OStJ – of Palmerston North. For services to the New Zealand Defence Force and aviation medicine.
- Captain Richard Alan Walker – of Auckland. For services to the New Zealand Defence Force.
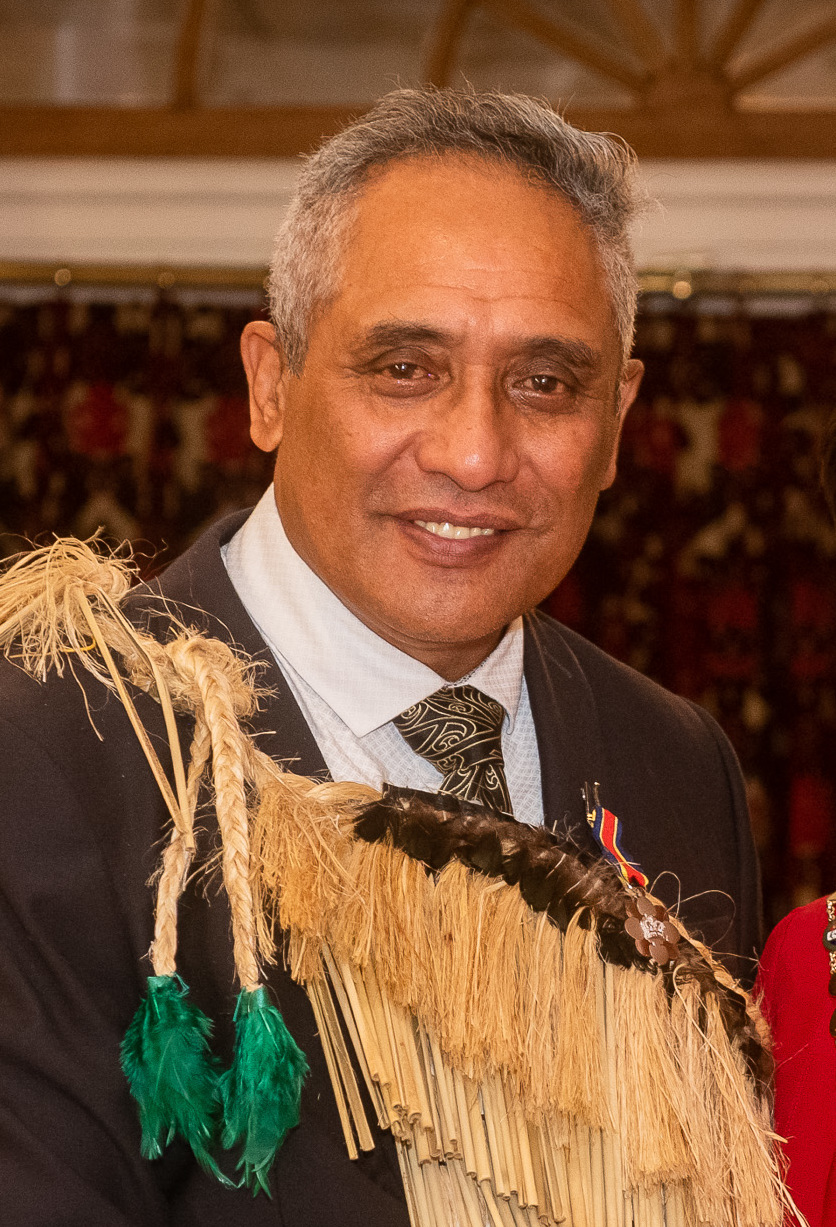
Danny Broughton

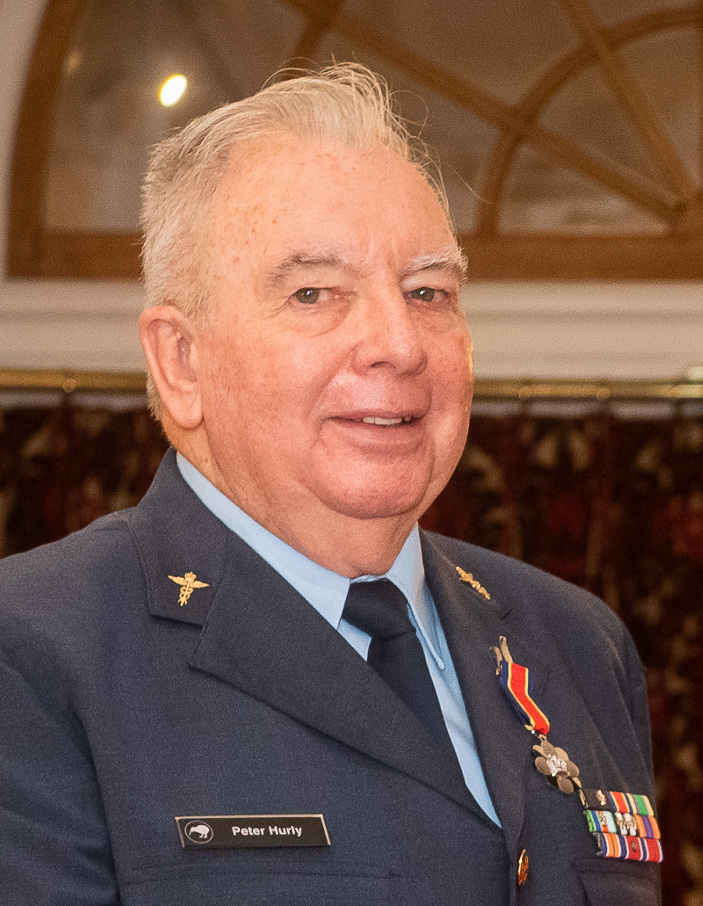
Peter Hurly

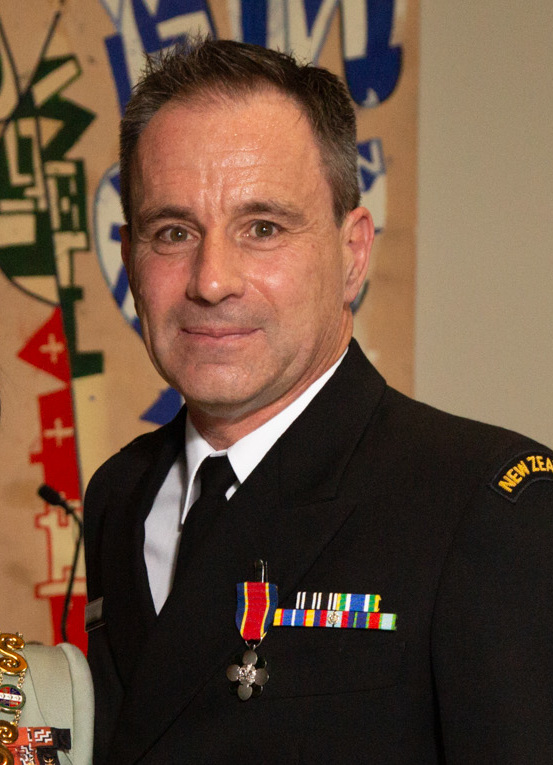
Richard Walker
