= Paul Adams (property developer) =

New Zealand businessman and philanthropist

Sir Paul Adams KNZM
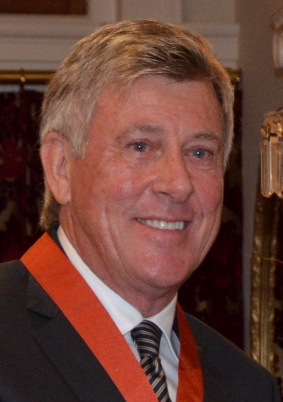
- Adams in 2015
- Born: Paul Hunter Adams; 1948 or 1949 (age 77–78); Lower Hutt, NZ
- Education: Bachelor in Engineering
- Occupations: Businessman, philanthropist

Sir Paul Hunter Adams KNZM (1948 or 1949) is a New Zealand businessman and philanthropist. In the 2015 New Year Honours, he was appointed a Companion of the New Zealand Order of Merit, for services to business and philanthropy. He was elevated to Knight Companion of the New Zealand Order of Merit, for services to philanthropy and the community, in the 2019 Queen's Birthday Honours.

In 2023, Adams was inducted into the New Zealand Business Hall of Fame.
