= Bryan Waddle =

New Zealand sports broadcaster

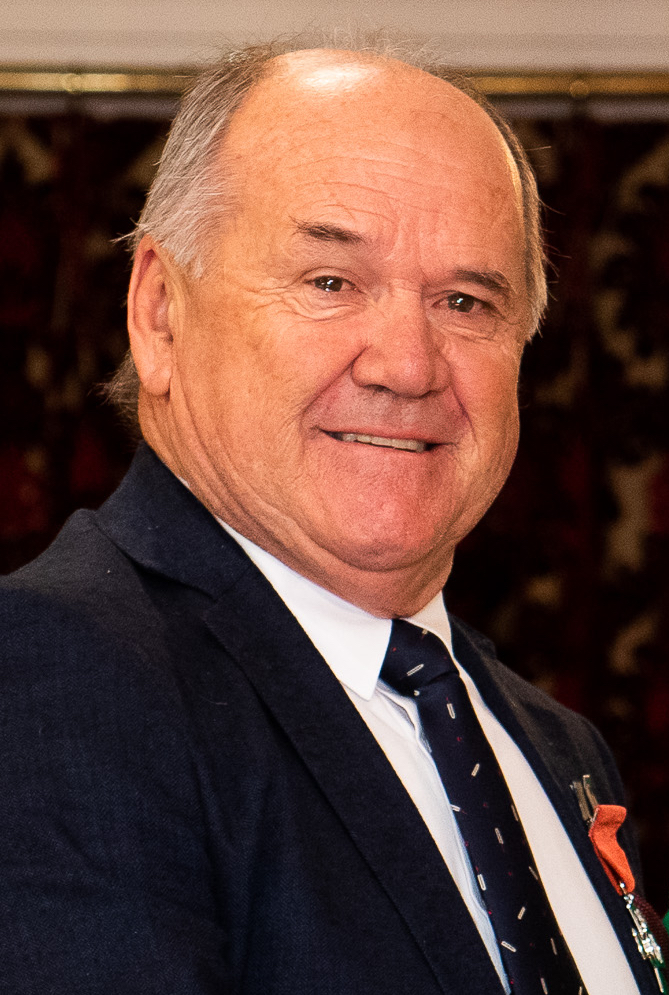
Waddle in 2019

Bryan Alexander Waddle MNZM (born 15 December 1948) is a veteran New Zealand sports broadcaster, sometimes called "The voice of New Zealand cricket".

Waddle grew up in Karori and went to school at Wellington College. His father was the public address announcer at the Basin Reserve, while his mother did the catering. After working for the ANZ Bank he joined the Wellington radio station 2ZB as a sports broadcaster.

In New Zealand he is best known for his cricket commentaries on Radio Sport; he has also appeared on the BBC's cricket commentaries on Test Match Special and as a guest commentator in Australia on the ABC's cricket coverage. Beginning with the Test match between New Zealand and India at the Basin Reserve in Wellington in February 1981, he has commentated on more than 250 Tests and more than 400 one-day internationals.

Although primarily a radio commentator, Waddle also appeared on television as co-host (with Jeremy Coney) of The Dilmah Tea Party, a 15-minute celebrity interview conducted on-field during the tea interval of Test matches played in New Zealand. With Coney and John Parker he wrote the cricket book The Wonderful Days of Summer (Moa Beckett, Auckland, 1993). He and Coney have presented a weekly podcast, On the Front Foot, since December 2020; they reached 200 episodes in December 2024.

Waddle and his wife Clare have a son and a daughter. He was appointed a Member of the New Zealand Order of Merit in the 2019 Queen's Birthday Honours, for services as a sports broadcaster.
