= Allison Dobbie =

New Zealand librarian

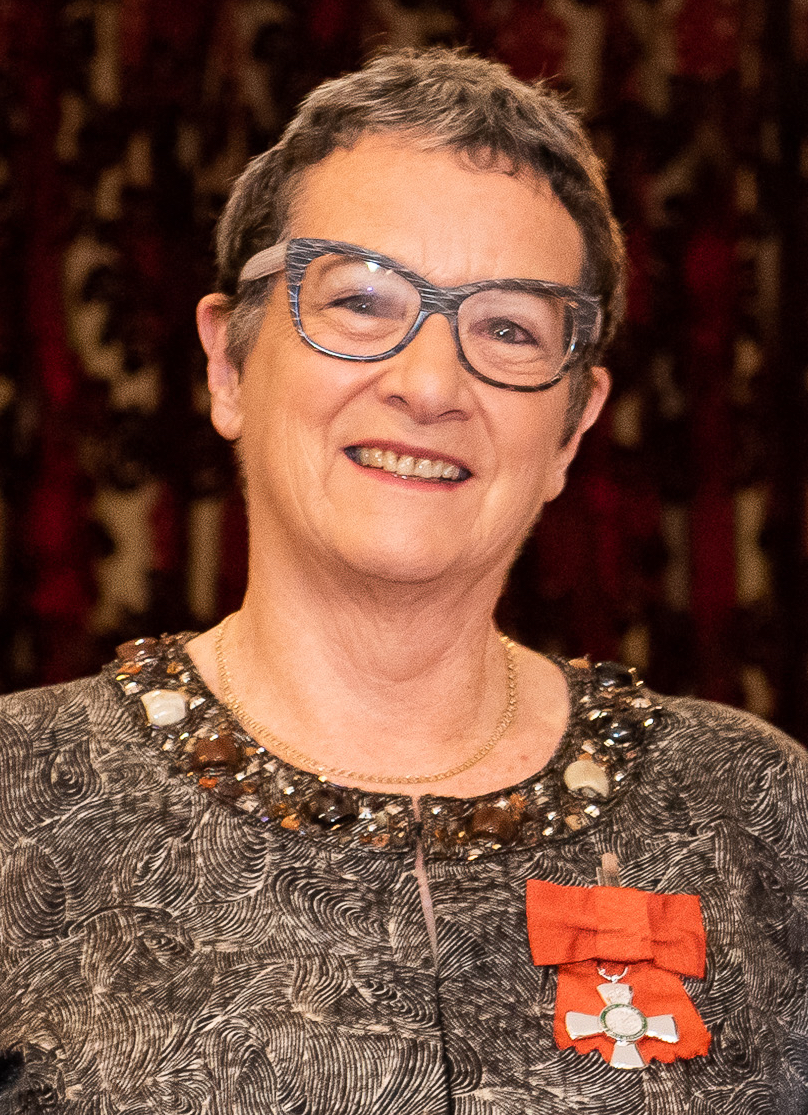
Dobbie in 2019

Allison Muriel Dobbie MNZM is a New Zealand librarian recognised for her leadership in library management and education for library professionals in New Zealand and the Oceania region.

== Early years ==
Dobbie was born in Southland, New Zealand, and attended high school in Waimate. Dobbie studied history at the University of Otago, Dobbie completed a postgraduate diploma in library studies in 1974 from the New Zealand Library School and an MA in librarianship from Victoria University in 1988.

== Career ==
During her career Dobbie served as a librarian in Christchurch, Dunedin and Parliament, and led Auckland Libraries through the merger of seven library systems with 55 libraries forming the largest public library system in the southern hemisphere.

Dobbie led the development and adoption of the first registration scheme for library and information professionals in New Zealand.

Dobbie was a member of the Establishment Committee for the INELI-Oceania leadership development programme for emerging library leaders in Australia, New Zealand and the Pacific islands and a member of the Gates Global Libraries Advisory Network from 2009 – 2011.

== Works ==
- Co-operation versus competition in the development of e-services in libraries (2002)
- Digitizing cultural resources : a practical guide for public libraries (2004)

== Awards ==
- 2010 Honorary Life Member of LIANZA
- 2019 Member of the New Zealand Order of Merit (MNZM) for services to library and information management and the arts.
