= Wellington College, New Zealand =

Wellington College

Location
- 15 Dufferin Street, Mount Victoria; Wellington, 6021; New Zealand; 41°18′13″S 174°46′57″E

Information
- Former names: Wellington Grammar School
- Type: State Secondary
- Motto: Māori: Tiaho te ao, tiaho te ao mārama, Latin: Lumen accipe et imperti (Receive The Light And Pass It On)
- Established: 1867; 159 years ago
- Sister school: Wellington Girls' College, Rongotai College
- Ministry of Education Institution no.: 275
- Headmaster: Glen Denham
- Years: 9 – 13
- Gender: Boys
- Enrolment: 1,929 (July 2026)
- Colors: Black and Gold
- Socio-economic decile: 10Z
- Publication: The Wellingtonian
- Website: www.wellington-college.school.nz

Wellington College, is a state-run boys' secondary school in Wellington, New Zealand. It is situated on 12 hectares of green belt land in the suburb of Mount Victoria, in the vicinity of the Basin Reserve and Government House. The school was founded in 1867 through a deed of endowment from Sir George Grey, the then Governor of New Zealand.

Wellington College is one of the oldest boys' secondary schools in New Zealand. The history and influence of Wellington College have made it notable in the history of New Zealand, with prominent alumni such as Arthur Coningham, Bernard Freyberg and William Pickering. The school is known nationally for both its academic success, as well as a large number of sporting activities.

The school has an enrolment of about 1,900 boys. Glen Denham is the current Headmaster.

== History ==
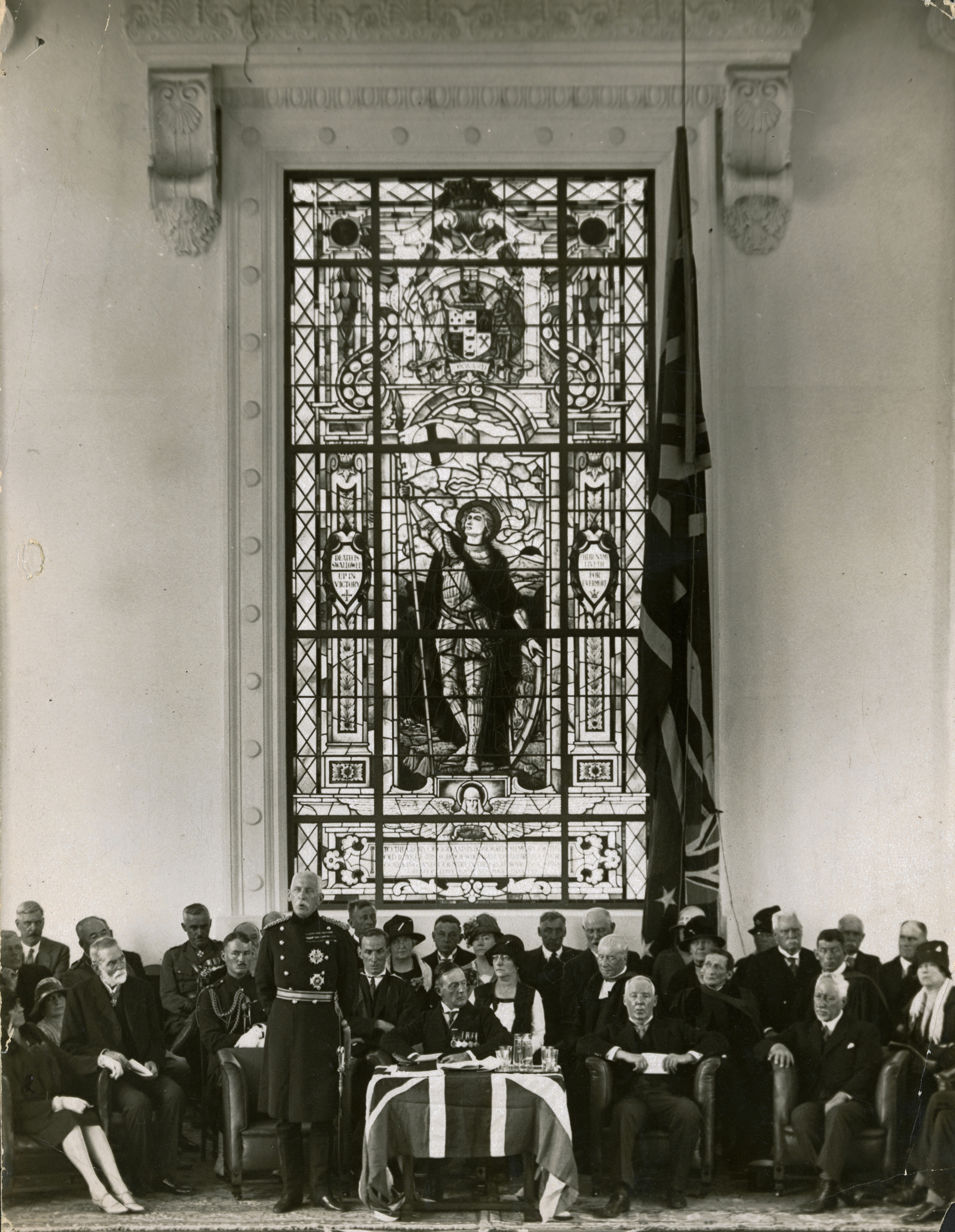
Opening of the Memorial Hall, Wellington College

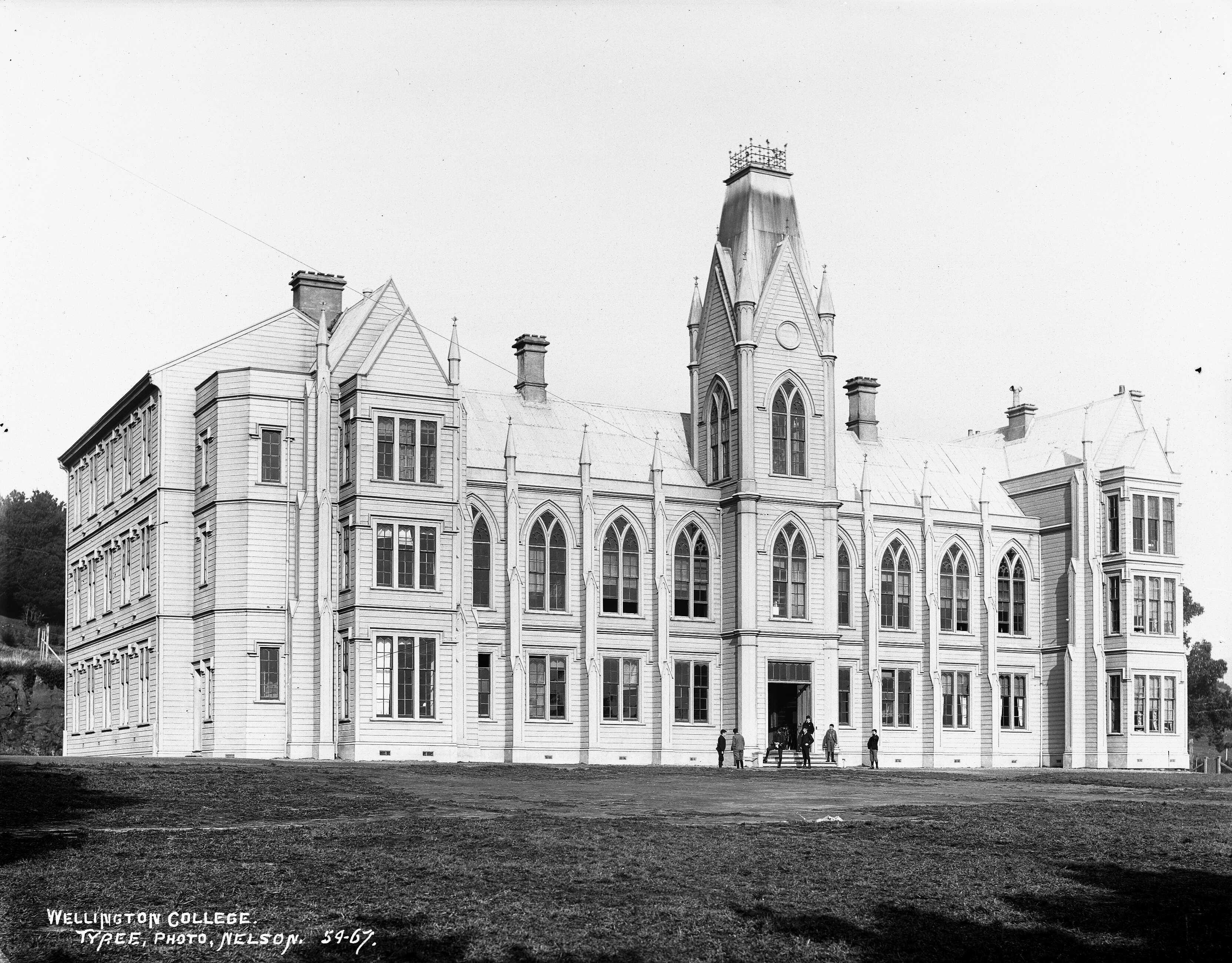
Wellington College's old Toxward building c.1890

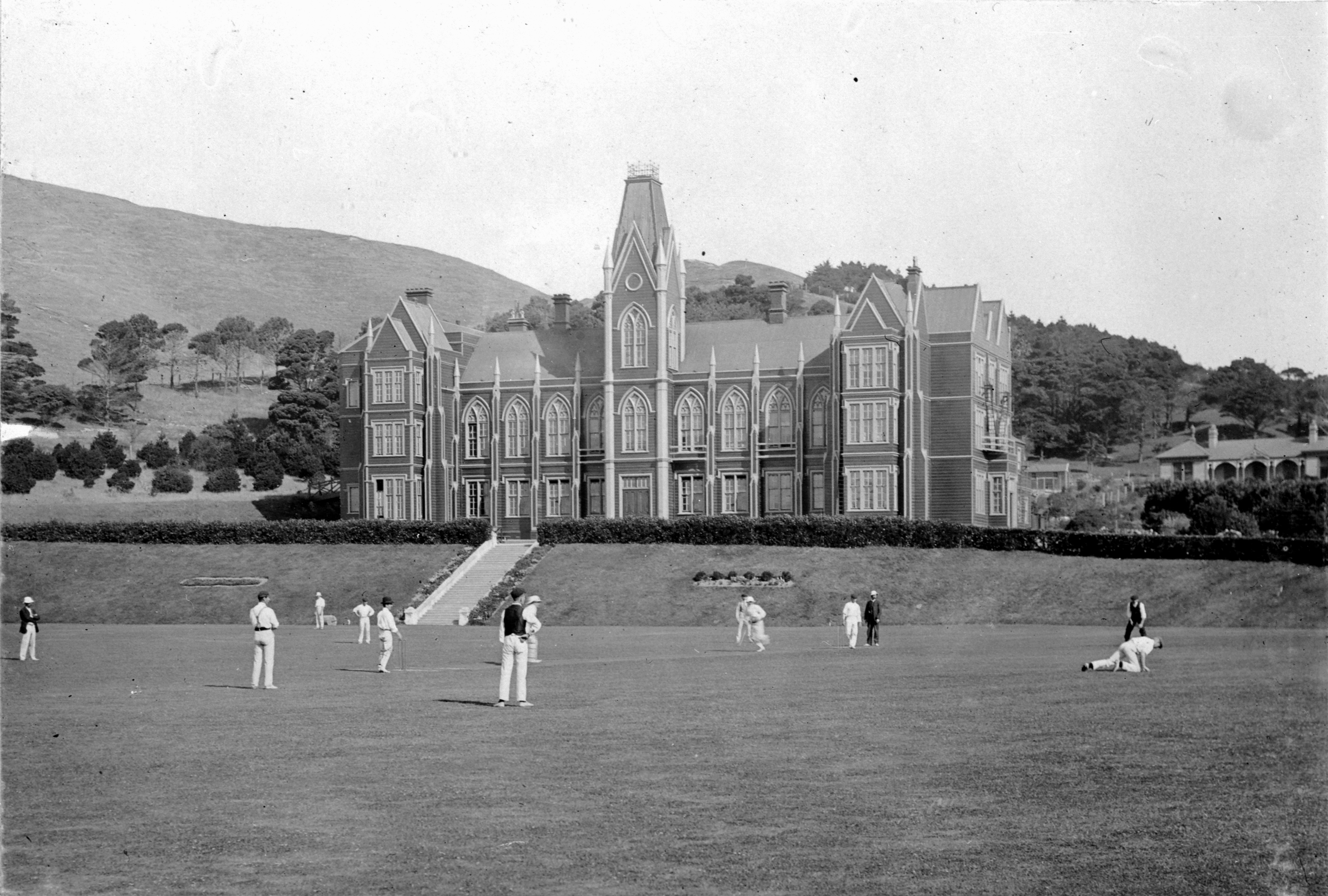
Cricket game at Wellington College, c. 1900

Wellington College opened in 1867 as Wellington Grammar School in Woodward Street, though Sir George Grey gave the school a deed of endowment in 1853. In 1869 the school moved to a new, spired, wooden building on the hills above the central city in Clifton Terrace from where it could be seen from many places in Wellington. In 1874 the college opened in a much larger building at its present location. The former boarding establishment at the College, Firth House, was named after Joseph Firth, the headmaster from 1892 to 1921.

Wellington College's Pavilion, Firth House, and the Gifford Observatory were opened on 1 December, 1924. The War Memorial Hall was opened on 2 March, 1928, financially supported by £6000 from the Old Boys' Association. The War Memorial Hall and classroom wings were demolished by the Ministry of Works and replaced in the 1960s with a new hall and seven-storey Tower classroom block due to its lack of earthquake reinforcements. The stained glass window from the front of the War Memorial Hall is now in the front of the existing hall.

In the 1960s the Old Boys Gymnasium was built on the eastern boundary of the campus replacing the swimming pool and during the 1970s the Maths, Library, and Technology blocks were opened, replacing the last of the War Memorial Hall building and classroom wings that opened in 1928.

In 1980 Firth House was demolished to make way for a new gymnasium which opened in 1982. 1988 saw the opening of the Arts and Music block, and the Brierley Theatre, named after old boy Ron Brierley.

The first dedicated computer rooms in the College opened in 1994 in a new building behind the school hall.

2001 saw the Science block's opening on the western boundary of the campus. In 2008 the Languages block opened, also located on the west boundary.

The campus also has many prefabricated buildings, some functioning as offices or classrooms.

The only "historical" buildings remaining on campus to this day are Firth Hall, the Pavilion, and the Gifford Observatory.

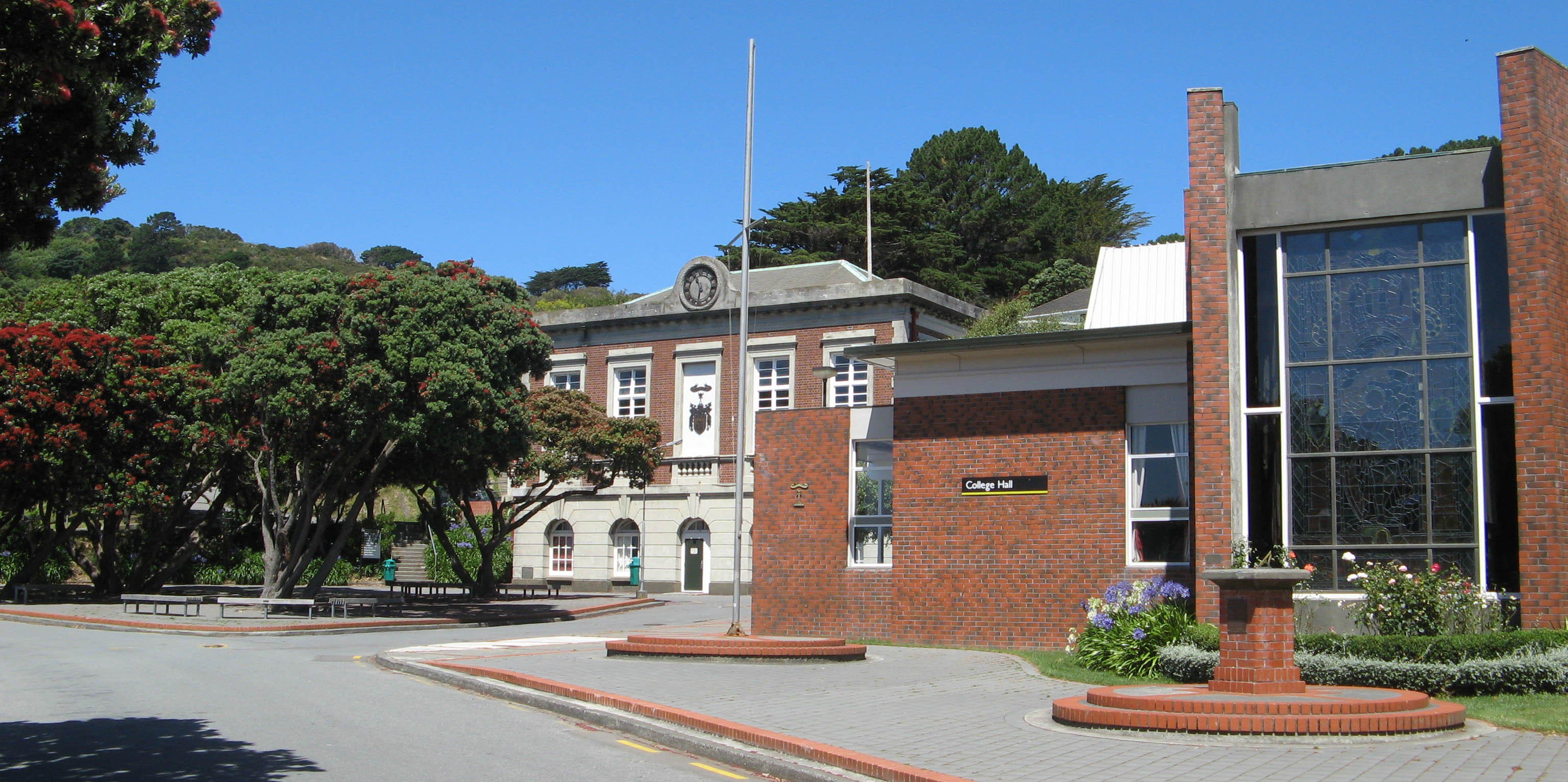
Firth Hall, left, and the former College Hall, right

In 2016, the College Hall was demolished to make way for a larger Assembly Hall and Performing Arts Centre, which would be able to hold the entire school with its growing population. In preparation for this, the staffroom was moved to Firth Hall, the Uniform Shop opened a new premise next to the Archives, and the Computer Block was opened on the first floor of Tower Block. Construction on the new hall commenced in September 2016 and was opened in 2018 by Jacinda Ardern.

== About ==
Wellington College's enrolment zone mainly covers the central and western suburbs of Wellington, (Rongotai College serves the southeastern suburbs, and Onslow College the northern suburbs).

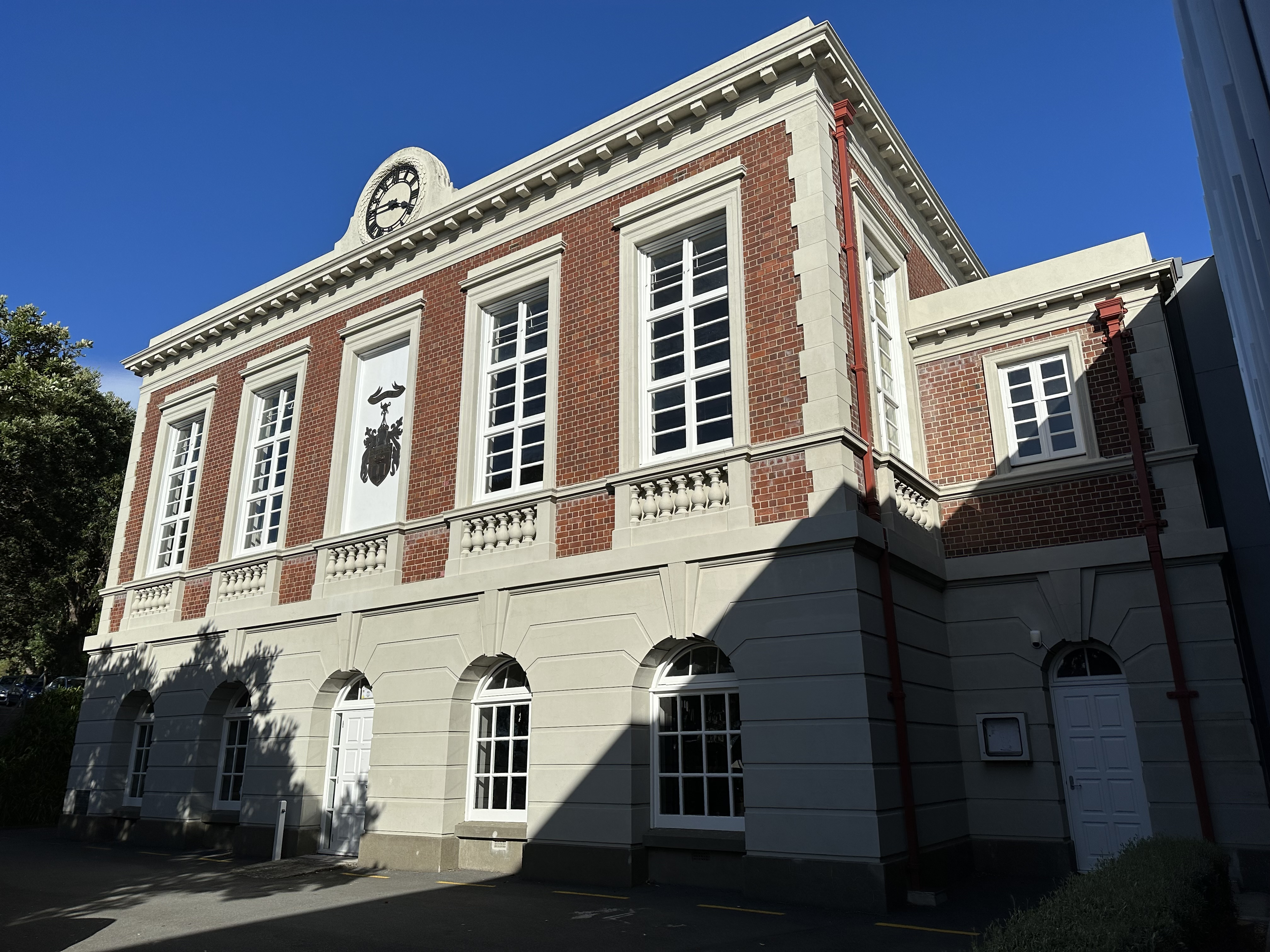
Firth House

The school also competes in a local athletics competition known as "McEvedy Shield" along with St. Patrick's College (Town), St. Patrick's College (Silverstream) and Rongotai College. Historically, Wellington College has won the shield more than any other school.

It is next to Wellington East Girls' College, also in Mount Victoria, and shares with that college the Gifford Observatory. Although Wellington College is situated next to Wellington East Girls' College, its sister college is Wellington Girls' College located in Thorndon.

In 2011, 2012, and 2013, Wellington College earned the highest number of scholarships in the New Zealand scholarship exams.

== Board of trustees ==
The Wellington College Board of Trustees consists of twelve elected and appointed members.

Currently the Board Chair is Cameron Harland, who is also the Chief Executive at NZ On Air

== Notable alumni ==
=== The Arts ===
- John Beaglehole – historian
- Colin Beyer – lawyer and businessman
- Roy Cowan – potter, illustrator, and printmaker
- Maxwell Fernie – organist, conductor and music teacher
- Alexander Grant – ballet dancer, teacher, and company director
- W. Gray Young – architect
- Jonathan Harlen – author
- Dai Henwood – comedian
- Raybon Kan – writer and comedian
- Bret McKenzie – Academy Award-winning songwriter and member of Flight of the Conchords
- Gordon McLauchlan – writer
- John Mulgan – editor, writer, journalist and Army officer
- Clive Matthew-Wilson – writer
- David Mitchell – poet
- Don Peebles – artist
- Robert J. Pope – songwriter, poet, cricketer
- Jack Shallcrass – author, educator, and humanist
- Burton Silver – cartoonist, parodist, and writer
- Charles Treadwell – lawyer, soldier, author and politician
- Karl Urban – actor
- Clement Gordon Watson – editor, journalist, soldier, communist activist
- Kenneth Athol Webster – collector and dealer of manuscripts, fine art, and ethnographic artifacts associated with Oceanic peoples.

=== Broadcasting & journalism ===
- Edward George Honey – Australian journalist credited by some as the originator of the Two-minute silence tradition
- John Campbell – journalist, radio and television personality
- Graeme Moody – sports broadcaster
- Keith Quinn – TV and radio sports presenter
- Chris Spence – journalist
- Selwyn Toogood – radio and television personality.
- Bryan Waddle – cricket commentator & radio presenter

=== Business ===
- Ron Brierley – businessman
- George Burnes – businessman and first-class cricketer
- Stewart Duff – businessman, civic advocate and politician
- Alan Gibbs – businessman
- Saul Goldsmith – importer and merchant
- Michael Hirschfeld – businessman, and was President of the New Zealand Labour Party from 1995 to 1999.
- Arthur Myers – businessman and politician
- Steve Outtrim – businessman
- Frank Renouf – businessman
- Stephen Town – chief executive

=== Public service ===
- Henry Avery – New Zealand's Quartermaster General during World War Two and former All Black
- Grafton Francis Bothamley – Clerk of the New Zealand House of Representatives
- George T. Bolt – public servant, served as chairman of the Public Service Commission
- Alfred Brandon (mayor) – Mayor of Wellington
- Alfred Brandon (RAF officer) – lawyer and military aviator who served in the First World War
- Edmund Percy Bunny – Mayor of Lower Hutt
- John Gibbs Churchill – trade unionist and local politician
- Arthur Coningham – World War II commander and World War I Air Ace. Portrayed in the film Patton
- Ken Douglas – trade union leader and politician
- James Lloyd Findlay – soldier and air force officer who served in both World Wars.
- Bernard Freyberg – Governor-General, World War I VC Winner and World War II commander
- Les Gandar – politician of the National Party.
- William Gaudin – politician
- Thomas Gault – Justice of the Supreme Court of New Zealand
- William Gentry – World War II commander
- Thomas Goddard – jurist
- Lord Grey of Naunton – last Governor of Northern Ireland
- Hamish Hancock – former National Party MP for Horowhenua and a lawyer
- Frederick Hanson – World War II commander, subsequently Commissioner of Works at the Ministry of Works
- Michael Hardie Boys – former Governor-General of New Zealand
- Thomas Hislop – Mayor of Wellington from 1931 to 1945
- Don Hunn CNZM – senior New Zealand diplomat, civil servant, and State Services Commissioner
- Thomas Jordan – was the mayor of Masterton from 1925 to 1944, and was a teacher and then lawyer.
- John Larkindale – former New Zealand public servant and diplomat
- Ngātata Love – academic and Treaty negotiator
- John Levy MacDuff – lawyer and magistrate
- Aussie Malcolm – former National Party politician
- Peter Malone – veterinary surgeon and politician
- Rex Mason – politician
- Colin McLeod – civil engineer, who served as the Commissioner of Works between 1973 and 1981.
- Frank Moore – political activist
- Norman Harold Moss – Mayor of Stratford, New Zealand from 1947 to 1957.
- Michael Myers – judge
- Humphrey O'Leary – Chief Justice of New Zealand, from 1946 to 1953.
- Matthew Oram – lawyer, politician, Speaker of Parliament
- Graham Beresford Parkinson – World War II commander
- Paul Reeves – former Governor-General of New Zealand
- Adrian G. Rodda – senior civil servant and Chairman of the State Services Commission
- Eric Roussell – Clerk of the New Zealand House of Representatives
- Rino Tirikatene – Labour Party politician and a former MP
- Alastair Scott – politician
- Tom Seddon – politician of the Liberal Party, and a lawyer in Greymouth
- Charles Skerrett – fifth Chief Justice of New Zealand, from 1926 to 1929
- Ron Smith – public servant, communist and peace activist
- Duncan Stout – medic, soldier and author
- William Ball Sutch – New Zealand public servant, put on trial for espionage
- Geoff Thompson – former New Zealand politician of the National Party.
- Ray Wallace – Mayor of Lower Hutt from 2010 to 2019
- Thomas Wilford – politician
- Hugh Williams – former president of the New Zealand Electoral Commission and a retired judge of the High Court of New Zealand. From 2016 to 2022 he was Chief Justice of the Cook Islands.
- Bill Young – politician representing the National Party

=== Science ===
- George Leslie Adkin – farmer, geologist, ethnologist, photographer, and environmentalist.
- Brian Barratt-Boyes – New Zealand cardiothoracic surgeon
- David Beaglehole – New Zealand physicist
- David Benney – emeritus professor and former head of the Department of Mathematics at MIT
- Ian Foster – computer scientist
- Murray Hill – seed technologist
- Diamond Jenness – anthropologist in Canada
- William Pickering – former Head of the NASA Jet Propulsion Laboratory (space scientist)
- Philip Robertson – chemist, university professor and writer
- John Salmon – photographer, entomologist, academic, conservationist, and author.
- Jonathan Sarfati – creationist, scientist, and New Zealand Chess Champion
- Fred White – New Zealand-born Australian physicist and ornithologist who was Chairman of CSIRO

=== Sport ===
- Leni Apisai – rugby union player
- Ernest Beechey – cricketer
- Charles Benbow – cricketer
- Ernest Bezzant – cricketer
- James Blackwell – rugby union player
- Perry Freshwater – rugby union player for Leicester Tigers and England Rugby
- Nelson Asofa-Solomona – rugby league player for Melbourne Storm
- Trevor Barber – cricketer
- Wally Barclay – cricketer
- Tom Blundell – professional cricketer for the Wellington Firebirds and New Zealand Black Caps
- Leo Bertos – former professional football player for the Wellington Phoenix, Rochdale A.F.C., Perth Glory FC and the All Whites
- Harry Boam – cricketer for the Wellington Firebirds
- Craig Bradshaw – Former Professional Basketballer, and member of New Zealand Tall Blacks
- George Bridgewater – New Zealand rower
- Tim Brown – former professional footballer for the Wellington Phoenix and the All Whites. Also co-founder of Allbirds
- Ralph Caulton – All Black
- Dane Coles – All Black
- David Collins – cricketer
- Ambrose Curtis – rugby union player
- Victor du Chateau – cricketer
- Ernie Dodd – rugby union player
- Quentin Donald – rugby union player
- Ross Durant – football player for New Zealand All Whites
- Bill Dustin – cricketer
- Simon Elliott – former football player with the Los Angeles Galaxy, San Jose Earthquakes and New Zealand All Whites
- Ken Elliott – All black
- Marc Ellis – former All Black, entertainer, businessman
- James Franklin – cricketer, plays for Black Caps and Wellington Firebirds
- Wilfred Findlay – cricketer, soldier and businessman
- Henry Foley – cricketer
- Perry Freshwater – English rugby union player
- Wes Goosen – Rugby Union player for Hurricanes
- Reggie Goodes – former South African-born rugby union player
- Frank Glasgow – rugby union player
- Hāmi Grace – cricketer
- Christian Gray – association football player
- Ken Gray – All Black
- Bernard Griffiths – cricketer
- Jack Griffiths (rugby union) – rugby union player
- Charlie Gubb – former rugby league player for New Zealand Warriors
- Everett Hales – cricketer
- Brian Hastings – cricketer
- Kemara Hauiti-Parapara – rugby union player
- TJ Ioane – rugby union player
- Frank Joplin – cricketer
- Joe Latta – rugby union player
- Tiny Leys – rugby union player
- Martin Luckie – cricketer
- Frank Luxford – cricketer
- Brian Marris – cricketer
- Onny Parun – tennis player
- Dion Prewster – Professional Basketballer, and member of New Zealand Tall Blacks.
- Euan Robertson – distance runner
- Lima Sopoaga – All Black
- Peter Taylor – New Zealand rower
- Neemia Tialata – All Black
- Filo Tiatia – All Black
- Ian Uttley – All Black
- Phillip Wilson – Olympic gold medallist rower

== Headmasters ==
Period	Headmaster
1867	Henry Tuckey and William Hamilton
1869–1874	Thomas Bowden
1874–1881	Kenneth Wilson
1881–1892	Joseph Mackay
1892–1921	Joseph Firth, CMG
1921–1928	Thomas Cresswell
1928–1943	William Armour
1943–1951	Edward Hogben
1951–1963	Harold Heron
1963–1979	Seddon Hill
1979–1995	Harvey Rees-Thomas
1995–2018	Roger Moses, CNZM
2018–2021	Gregor Fountain
2022–	Glen Denham

== Coat of arms ==
Coat of arms of Wellington College
Granted On 7 October 1987 by the Lord Lyon King of Arms. The cost of the grant was donated by K. Rees-Thomas, an old boy of the college and father of headmaster H. G. Rees-Thomas Crest A Wreath of the Liveries is set for Crest a pedestal ornamented in the style of Sheraton Argent supporting a hand lamp as in the Arms Helm A sallet Proper lined Gules, with a Mantling Sable doubled Or Escutcheon Or, an open book Proper, binding and fore-edges Gules, ensigned by a covered hand lamp burning proper, pendent from the sinister side of the book a bookmark Gules charged with five plates in saltire, on a chief Sable four mullets of the Field. Motto Latin: Lumen accipe et imperti (Receive The Light And Pass It On) Symbolism The coat of arms of Wellington College is based on that of Bernard Freyberg, charged with an oil lamp, used on the seal of the college since 1873, and a book, representing knowledge. The five plates on the bookmark come from the coat of arms of the Duke of Wellington. The sallet is a type of helmet usually granted to corporate bodies in Scottish heraldry.
