= Luxford =

Luxford is a surname, and may refer to:

- Frank Luxford (1862–1954), New Zealand cricketer
- George Luxford (1807–1854), English botanist
- George A. Luxford (1876–1956), associate justice of the Colorado Supreme Court
- Ian Luxford (born 1952), Australian rower
- John Luxford (1890–1971), New Zealand lawyer and Mayor of Auckland City
- Michael Luxford (born 1995), Australian rules footballer
- Nola Luxford (1901–1994), New Zealand film actor

== See also ==
- Luxford House, 16th-century Grade II listed building near Crowborough, East Sussex
