= Thomas Jordan (mayor) =

New Zealand politician

Thomas Jordan (30 April 1880 – 7 June 1945) was the mayor of Masterton from 1925 to 1944, and was a teacher and then lawyer.

Jordan was born in Christchurch in 1880, to Michael and Mary Jordan. They moved to Tawa (then called Tawa Flat) near Wellington where they lived on James Taylor's farm, then to a house near the Porirua Lunatic Asylum.

Jordan attended Tawa Flat School from 1886 to 1890, then Porirua School where he won a scholarship to Wellington College where he was dux in 1896. He secured a University Junior Scholarship to Victoria University of Wellington, graduating M.A., and taught at Wellington College from 1902 to 1907.

He graduated Ll.B in 1907, and then practiced law at Masterton. He became mayor of Masterton in 1925, and was mayor until shortly before his death.

In World War II he was chairman of the National Patriotic Fund Council and then was a member of the National Patriotic Fund Board. He was also on the Town Planning appeal board and the Transport Appeal board and on the local Power Board etc.

In his younger days, he was a prominent cricketer and rugby footballer, being on the Wellington Ranfurly Shield team about 1905.

He died in 1945. He was survived by his widow and a daughter, but details are not known.

See photo of Tom Jordan.

== Sources ==
- Carman, Arthur H (1956, 1970, 1982) Tawa Flat and the Old Porirua Road, ASIN B0007K64LC (page 98)
