= Manu Rere =

- Starring: Whaea Williams
- Country of origin: New Zealand

Original release
- Network: Māori Television
- Release: present

Manu Rere is a weekly New Zealand television educational show hosted by Kaa Williams.
