= Bill Dustin =

New Zealand cricketer

Personal information
- Full name: William Henry Dustin
- Born: 30 August 1909; Palmerston North, New Zealand
- Died: 24 September 2001 (aged 92); Whanganui, New Zealand
- Batting: Right-handed
- Role: Opening batsman

Domestic team information
- Years: Team
- 1927/28–1943/44: Wellington

Career statistics
Competition	First-class
Matches	11
Runs scored	435
Batting average	21.75
100s/50s	0/3
Top score	92
Balls bowled	38
Wickets	1
Bowling average	27.00
5 wickets in innings	0
10 wickets in match	0
Best bowling	1/11
Catches/stumpings	1/–
- Source: Cricinfo, 26 October 2023

William Henry Dustin (30 August 1909 – 24 September 2001) was a New Zealand cricketer. He played in eleven first-class matches for Wellington from 1927 to 1944.

Dustin and his twin brother were born in Palmerston North and attended Wellington College. Both played senior rugby and cricket in Wellington.

Bill Dustin was a right-handed opening batsman. He had his best season in 1931–32, when he formed an effective opening partnership with Stewie Dempster. He scored 186 runs in the Plunket Shield in that season, with a top score of 92 in a partnership of 239 with Dempster in the match against Canterbury, and Wellington won the Shield.

Dustin served in the Royal New Zealand Air Force in World War II. In 1942 he was the proprietor of a guesthouse in Otaki.
