= Ken Elliott =

New Zealand rugby union player

Kenneth George Elliott
- Born: Kenneth George Elliott; 3 March 1922 Wellington, New Zealand
- Died: 19 February 2006 (aged 83)
- Height: 193 cm (6 ft 4 in)
- School: Wellington College
- Occupation: Manager AMP

Rugby union career
- Position: Lock
International career
Years	Team	Apps	(Points)
1946	New Zealand		

Kenneth George Elliott (3 March 1922 – 19 February 2006) was an All Blacks rugby union player from New Zealand. He was a Lock and No 8.

He played 2 matches for the All Blacks in 1946 against Australia, scoring 6 points (2 tries).

He was born in Wellington and educated at Wellington College.

He served in the Army (2NZEF) in World War II, playing in services teams. Postwar he played in several provincial sides; Wellington, Manawatu and Waikato.
