= Tiny Leys =

- Born: Eric Tiki Leys; 25 May 1907 Wellington, New Zealand
- Died: 21 January 1989 (aged 81) Gisborne, New Zealand
- Height: 1.79 m (5 ft 10 in)
- Weight: 72 kg (159 lb)
- School: Wellington College
- Occupation: Public servant

Rugby union career
- Position: Halfback
Provincial / State sides
Years	Team	Apps	(Points)
1926–29	Wellington		
International career
Years	Team	Apps	(Points)
1929	New Zealand	1	(0)

Eric Tiki "Tiny" Leys (25 May 1907 – 21 January 1989) was a New Zealand rugby union player. A halfback, Leys represented Wellington at a provincial level, and was a member of the New Zealand national side, the All Blacks, on their 1929 tour of Australia. He played five matches on that tour, including one international.
