= Brian Marris =

New Zealand cricketer (1896/97–??)

Personal information
- Full name: Brian Alfred Marris
- Nickname: Curly
- Bowling: Right-arm leg-spin

Domestic team information
- Years: Team
- 1917–18 to 1919–20: Wellington

Career statistics
Competition	First-class
Matches	8
Runs scored	126
Batting average	18.00
100s/50s	0/0
Top score	22 not out
Balls bowled	761
Wickets	24
Bowling average	20.37
5 wickets in innings	1
10 wickets in match	–
Best bowling	5/50
Catches/stumpings	8/0
- Source: Cricinfo, 8 September 2018

Brian Alfred Marris (born 1896 or 1897; date of death unknown) was a New Zealand cricketer who played first-class cricket for Wellington from 1917 to 1920.

Brian Marris, known as "Curly", was a leg-spin bowler and useful batsman. He was educated at Wellington College. During World War I he worked in the Army Department’s Base Records Office in Wellington.

Marris scored 212 for the Old Boys club in a match of senior Wellington club cricket in December 1917. He made his first-class debut for Wellington against Canterbury a few days later, taking three wickets in each innings and batting in the tail. The next season, when the Plunket Shield resumed, he took 5 for 50 against Canterbury, combining with Syd Hiddleston to dismiss Canterbury for 163 in the first innings, but was expensive and wicketless in the second innings when Canterbury scored 303 for 3 and won by seven wickets.

Although he gained substantial turn from the pitch when he bowled, Marris lacked control. He lost his place in the Wellington side during the 1919-20 season and never regained it.
