= Michael Walker (biologist) =

New Zealand biologist

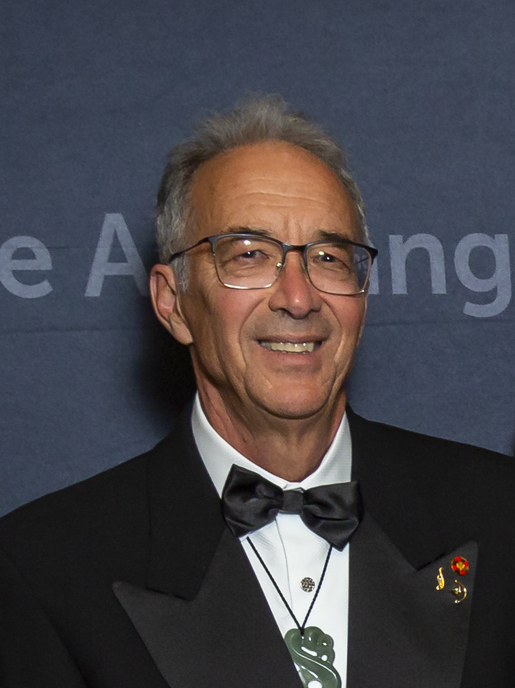
At 2019 Research Honours Aotearoa

Michael Mathew Walker ONZM FRSNZ is a biologist at University of Auckland notable for his work engaging with Māori students. He established a mentoring program called Tuākana in 1991, which pairs first year Māori students with more experienced students in an effort to reduce the previously-high drop-out rate. He is of Te Whakatōhea descent.

Walker was elected a Fellow of the Royal Society of New Zealand Te Apārangi in 2003. In the 2009 Queen's Birthday Honours, he was appointed an Officer of the New Zealand Order of Merit, for services to science.

In 2011, he won the Prime Minister’s Supreme Award, and a sustained excellence in teaching in a kaupapa Māori context award.
