= Roger Moses =

Roger Moses CNZM
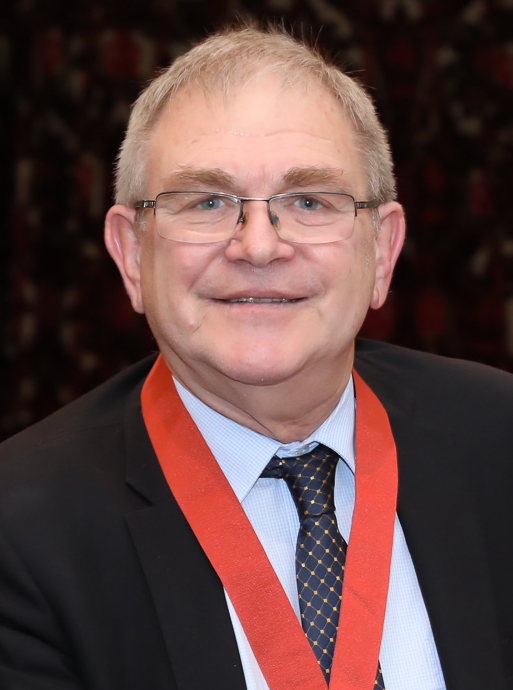

Headmaster of Wellington College
- In office 1995–2018
- Preceded by: Harvey Rees-Thomas
- Succeeded by: Gregor Fountain

Personal details
- Born: November 1954 (age 71)

Roger John Moses CNZM (born November 1954) is a New Zealand educationalist who has taught at Auckland Grammar School, Macleans College, Mahurangi College, and Waihi College. Moses was appointed as headmaster of Wellington College in 1995 and was made an Officer of the New Zealand Order of Merit in the 2009 Birthday Honours. He was chairman of the Association of Boys’ Schools of New Zealand from 2009 to 2017 and winner of the education section of the Wellingtonian of the Year in 2015. Moses resigned as Headmaster of Wellington College in 2018 and in the same year received an Absolutely Positively Wellingtonian Award. Moses was made a Companion of the New Zealand Order of Merit in the 2020 New Year Honours and was appointed to the board of the New Zealand Qualifications Authority in 2021.
