= Ross Durant =

New Zealand footballer, coach, and teacher

Personal information
- Full name: Ross W Durant
- Place of birth: New Zealand
- Position: Defender

Senior career*
Years	Team	Apps	(Gls)
- Christchurch United

International career
1980	New Zealand	4	(0)
- * Club domestic league appearances and goals

Ross Durant is a former association football player who played as a defender. He represented the New Zealand national team at international level.

Durant played four official internationals for the All Whites in the space of nine days, making his debut in a 2–0 win over Fiji on 21 February 1980 and earning his fourth and final cap in a 6–1 win over Solomon Islands on 29 February 1980.

Durant now teaches social studies and geography at Wellington College in New Zealand. He coached footballers Tim Brown and Leo Bertos during their time at Wellington College in their respective College Football teams.
