= 2009 Birthday Honours (New Zealand) =

New Zealand Honours list

2009 Queen's Birthday Honours
- Previous: 2009 New Year Honours; Next: 2009 Special Honours
- Type: New Zealand royal honours: New Zealand Order of Merit; Queen's Service Order; Queen's Service Medal; Distinguished Service Decoration
- Date: 1 June 2009
- Country: New Zealand

Highlights
- Total recipients: 172

The 2009 Queen's Birthday Honours in New Zealand, celebrating the official birthday of Queen Elizabeth II, were appointments made by the Queen in her right as Queen of New Zealand, on the advice of the New Zealand government, to various orders and honours to reward and highlight good works by New Zealanders. They were announced on 1 June 2009.

The recipients of honours are listed here as they were styled before their new honour.

== New Zealand Order of Merit ==
=== Dame Companion (DNZM) ===
- Jennifer Barbara Gibbs CNZM – of Auckland. For services to the arts.
- Iritana Te Rangi Tāwhiwhirangi CNZM MBE – of Masterton. For services to Māori education.
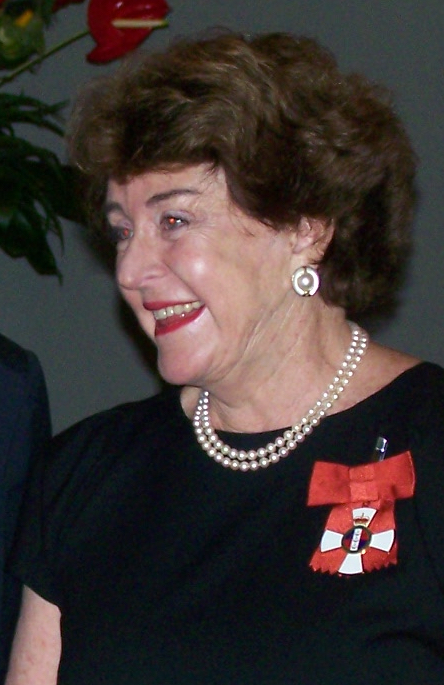
Dame Jenny Gibbs

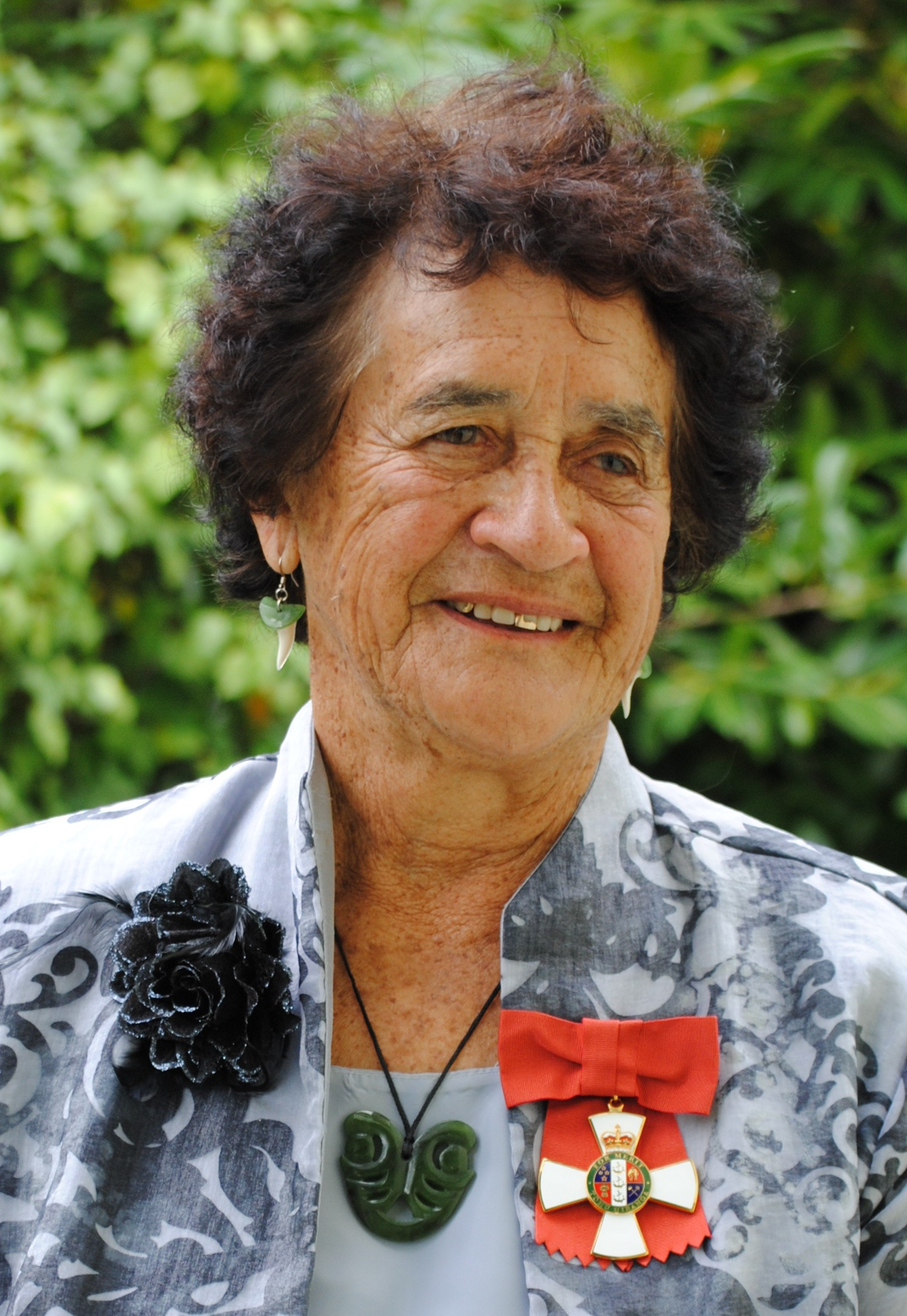
Dame Iritana Tāwhiwhirangi

=== Knight Companion (KNZM) ===
- John George Walker CBE – of Auckland. For services to sport and the community.
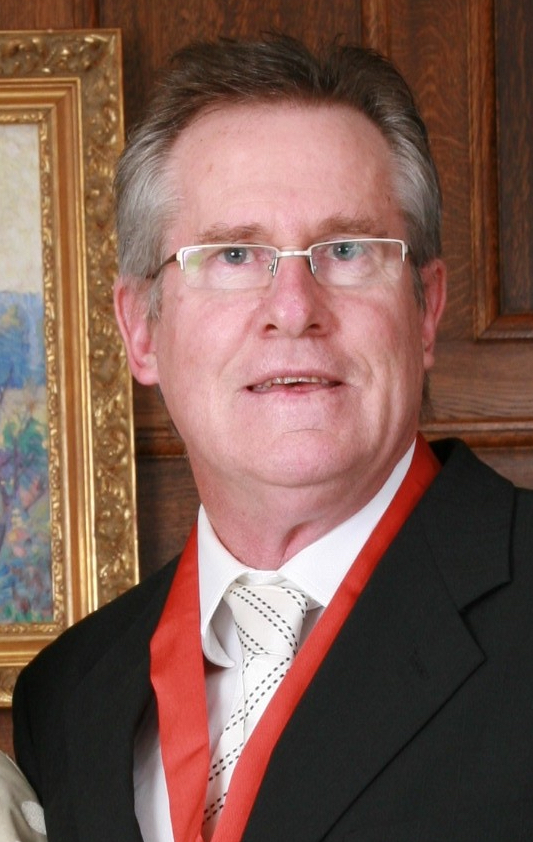
Sir John Walker

=== Companion (CNZM) ===
- Simon Peter Wallace Murdoch – of Wellington. For public services, lately as secretary of Foreign Affairs.
- Paula Rae Rebstock – of North Shore. For public services, lately as chair of the Commerce Commission.
- Saana (Hana) Waitai Romana Murray QSM – of Kaitaia. For services to the community.
- Professor Alison Stewart – of Lincoln. For services to biology, in particular plant pathology.
- Dr Jeffery Lewis Tallon – of Lower Hutt. For services to science.
- Professor Peter Rowland Thorne – of Auckland. For services to auditory neuroscience.
- John Desmond Todd – of Wellington. For services to business and the community.
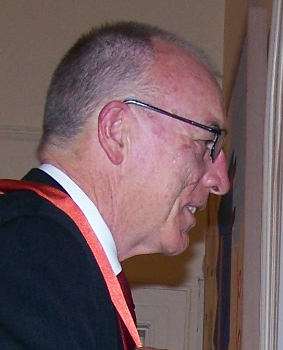
Simon Murdoch

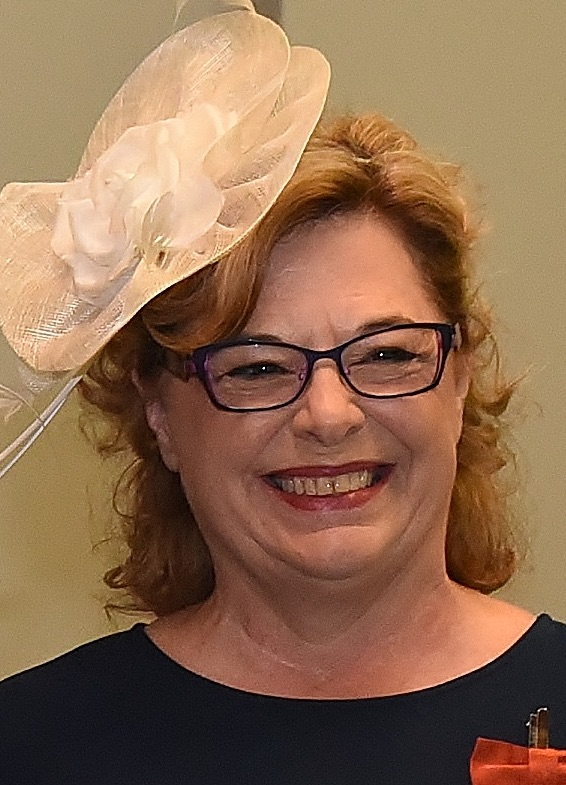
Paula Rebstock

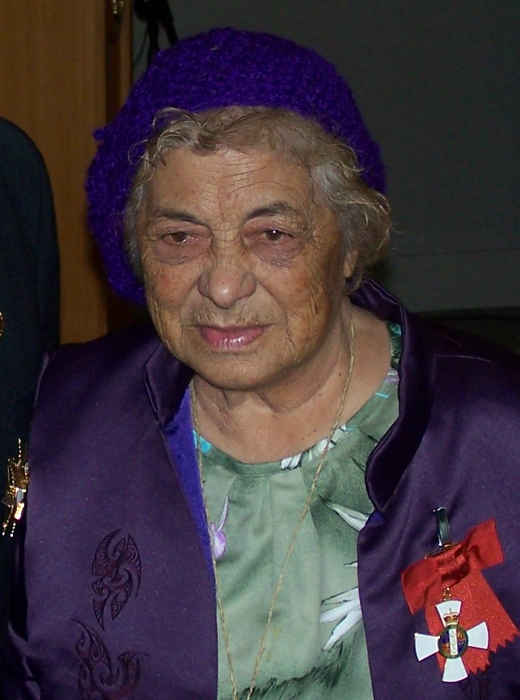
Saana Murray

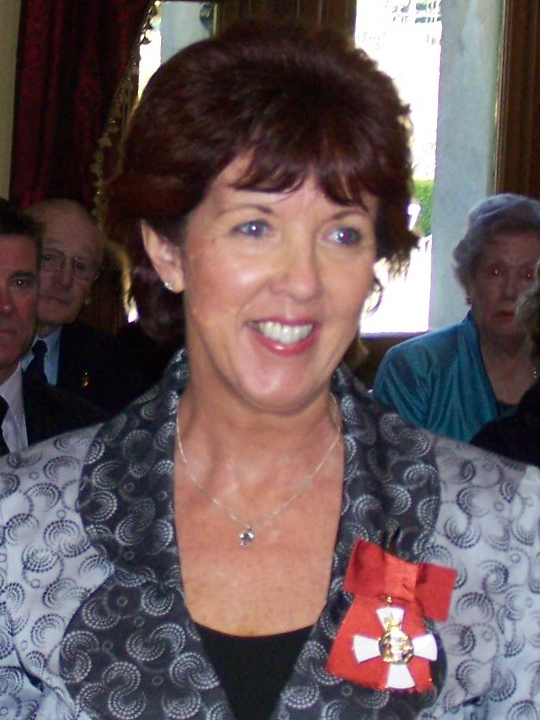
Alison Stewart

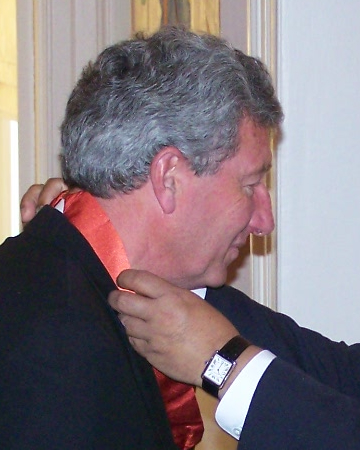
Jeff Tallon

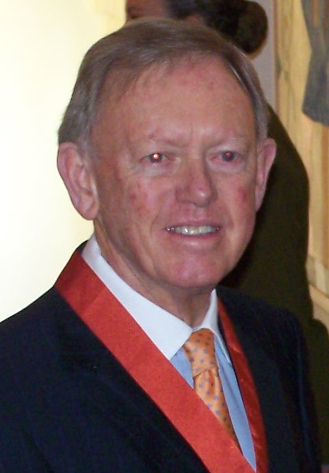
John Todd

=== Officer (ONZM) ===
- Ronald Chan – of Manukau. For services to business.
- Patrick William Cotter – of Christchurch. For services to medicine.
- Murray James Boyd Deaker – of North Shore. For services to broadcasting.
- Carl William Doy – of North Shore. For services to music.
- Dr Annabel Kirsten Finucane – of Auckland. For services to medicine, in particular paediatric heart surgery.
- Gurshon Fisher – of Auckland. For services to philanthropy.
- Associate Professor John Henley – of Auckland. For services to medicine.
- Jacqueline Mary Hughes – of Whakatāne. For services to the community.
- Robin Austin Judkins – of Christchurch. For services to sports administration.
- Stephen Peter Kearney – of Balwyn North, Victoria, Australia. For services to rugby league.
- Professor Stephen Irving Levine – of Wellington. For services to education and the Jewish community.
- Roger John Moses – of Wellington. For services to education.
- Robert Duncan Murdoch – of Wellington. For services to manufacturing and the community.
- Dr Graham James Sharpe – of Wellington. For services to anaesthesia.
- Jefferie James Tippen – of Christchurch. For services to tourism.
- Professor Michael Mathew Walker – of Auckland. For services to science.
- Frank Ivan Yukich – of Manukau. For services to wine industry.

Additional

- Colonel Graeme Roger Williams (retired) – Colonels' List, New Zealand Army.
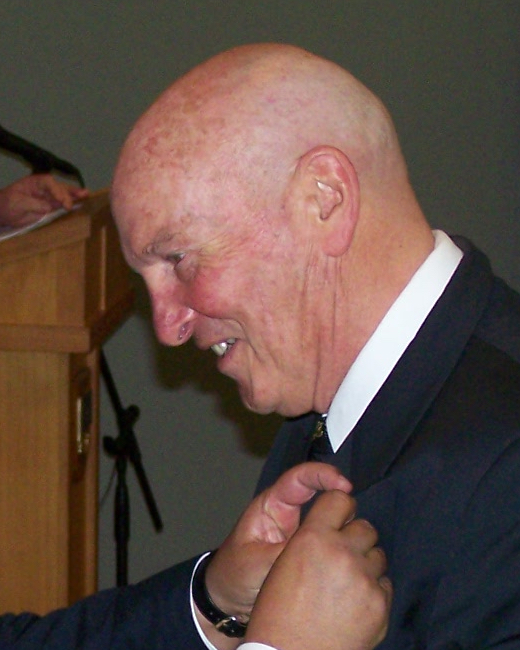
Murray Deaker

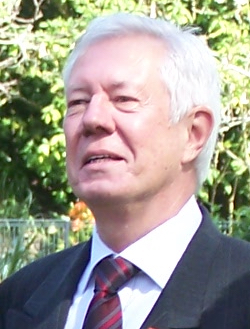
Carl Doy

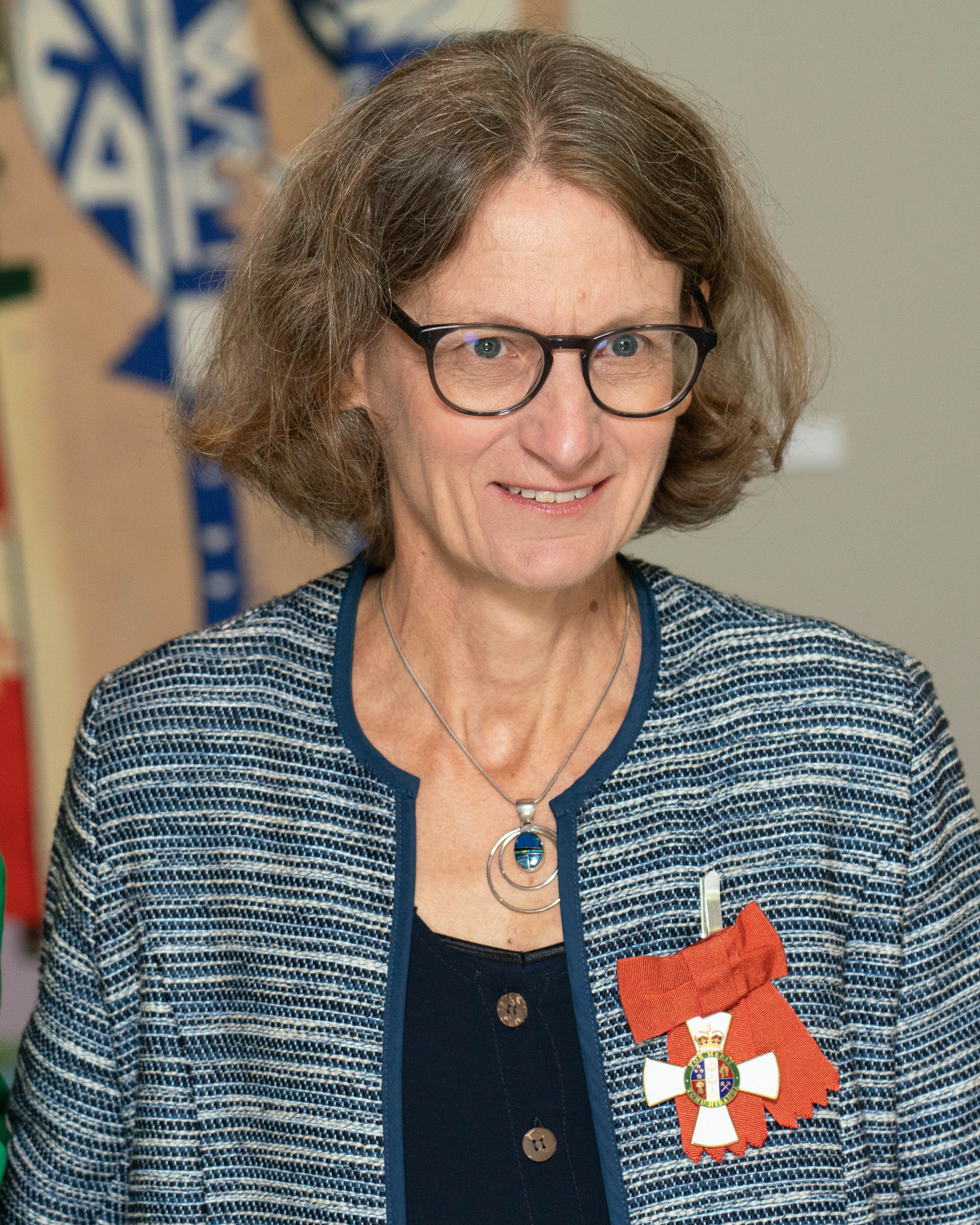
Kirsten Finucane

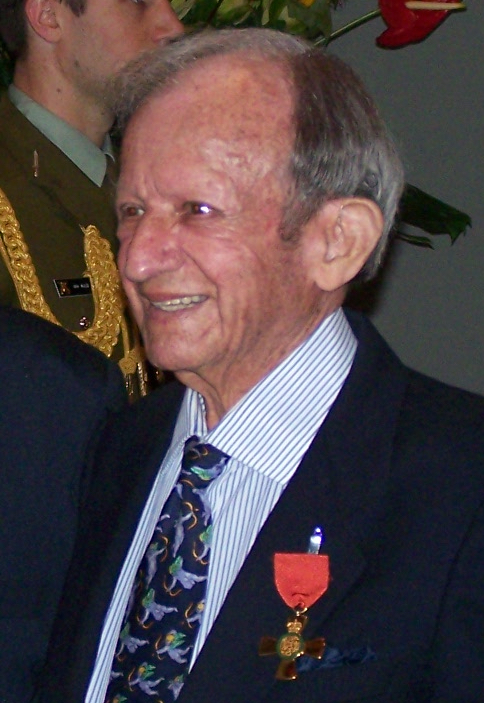
Gus Fisher

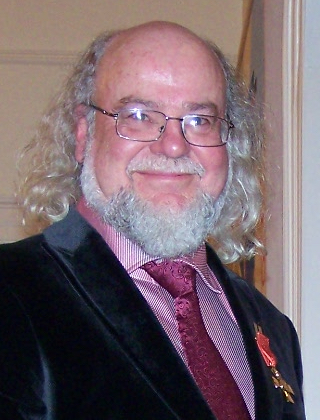
Robin Judkins

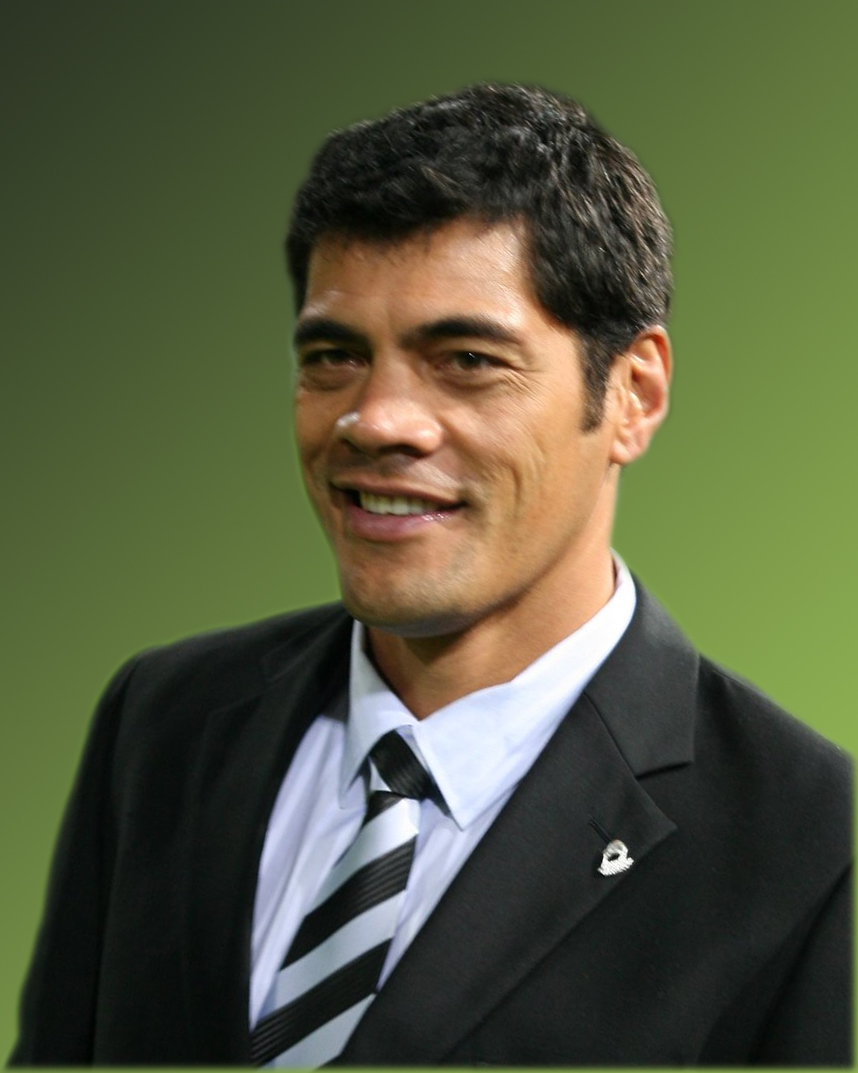
Stephen Kearney

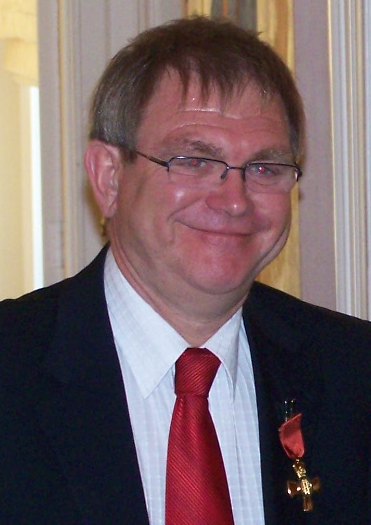
Roger Moses

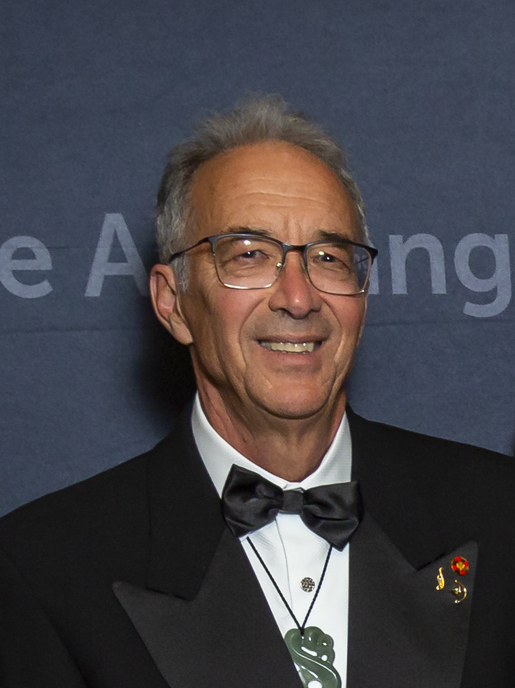
Michael Walker

=== Member (MNZM) ===
- Errol Douglas Baldwin – of Hamilton. For services to the community.
- Mary Tiki Balzer – of Hamilton. For services to Māori health.
- Brigit Diana Blair – of Christchurch. For services to business.
- Malcolm James Burgess – detective superintendent, New Zealand Police, of Christchurch. For services to the New Zealand Police.
- Norma Ellen Campbell – of Christchurch. For services to women's health, in particular midwifery.
- Yvonne Joyce Cave – of Wanganui. For services to photography and horticulture.
- Belinda Jane Charteris – of Christchurch. For services to netball.
- Professor George Raymond Clark – of Auckland. For services to biochemistry.
- Professor Terence John Crooks – of Dunedin. For services to education.
- Madeline Mary East – of Manukau. For services to education.
- Emeritus Professor David George Elms – of Christchurch. For services to civil engineering.
- Dr Francis Patrick Joseph Farry – of Queenstown. For services to rural medicine.
- Lester Campbell Flockton JP – of Dunedin. For services to education and pipe bands.
- Margaret Mary Anne Foster – of Christchurch. For services to sport, in particular netball.
- John William Gilks – of Wānaka. For services to business and the community.
- Frank Derrington Godbert – of Kerikeri. For services to yachting.
- Ronald Noel Harries – of Wellington. For services to soccer.
- Peter John Harris – of Huntly. For services to local-body affairs and rugby.
- Margaret Anne Ruwaioterangi Hiha – of Napier. For services to sport.
- Dr Cheung-Tak Hung – of Dunedin. For services to philanthropy and the Chinese community.
- Dr Richard John Isaacs – of Palmerston North. For services to oncology.
- Lauraine Annette Jacobs – of Auckland. For services to the food industry.
- Ian Laurie Keats – of Masterton. For services to shearing.
- John (Hone) Vivian Kouka – of Paekākāriki. For services to contemporary Māori theatre.
- Leslie Thomas Lunny – of Wanganui. For services to touch rugby.
- Joseph Te Poroa Malcolm JP – of Rotorua. For services to Māori.
- Ross Shepley Miller JP – of Kaitaia. For services to the community.
- John Brian Mooney – of Urenui. For services to the dairy industry.
- John Francis MacLean Morrison – of Wellington. For services to cricket and the community.
- Roshan Lal Nauhria – of Auckland. For services to business and the community.
- Che Ness (Che Fu) – of Auckland. For services to music.
- Daniel Francis O'Connell – senior constable, New Zealand Police, of Wellington. For services to the New Zealand Police.
- Robin Moncrieff Oliver – of Wellington. For services to the Department of Inland Revenue.
- Kevin John O'Sullivan – of Palmerston North. For services to the Anglican Church and the community.
- Haydn John Rawstron – of West Wickham, Kent, United Kingdom. For services to New Zealand interests in the United Kingdom.
- Puahaere Rutene – of Huntly. For services to Māori and netball.
- Paula Ann Ryan – of Auckland. For services to fashion.
- Rosalie Mary Sampson – of Karamea. For services to conservation and the community.
- Le'autuli'ilagi Taotua Malaeta Fa'asapisapi Sauvao JP – of Porirua. For services to the Samoan community and the community.
- Graeme Barry Sinclair – of Auckland. For services to television.
- Farib Sos JP – of Wellington. For services to international relations.
- Allan Murdoch Spence JP – of Auckland. For services to law and the community.
- David Thomas Steele JP – of Waimauku. For services to local-body affairs and the community.
- Ian Hardy Symonds JP – of Waikanae. For services to the community.
- Ngarau Tarawa JP – of Taumarunui. For services to Māori and community education.
- Te Whetu Werohia Tipiwai – of Napier. For services to Māori and rugby.
- Robert Te Ngau-ngau Tukiri JP – of Huntly. For services to the community.
- Philippa Jane Ussher – of Auckland. For services to photography.
- Irene van Dyk – of Upper Hutt. For services to netball.
- Norman Lawrence Withers – of Christchurch. For services to sport and the community.
- Jill Mabel Worrall – of North Shore. For services to social work.
- Robin Wray JP – of Auckland. For services to the community.

Additional

- Commander Blair Albert Gerritsen – Royal New Zealand Navy, of North Shore.
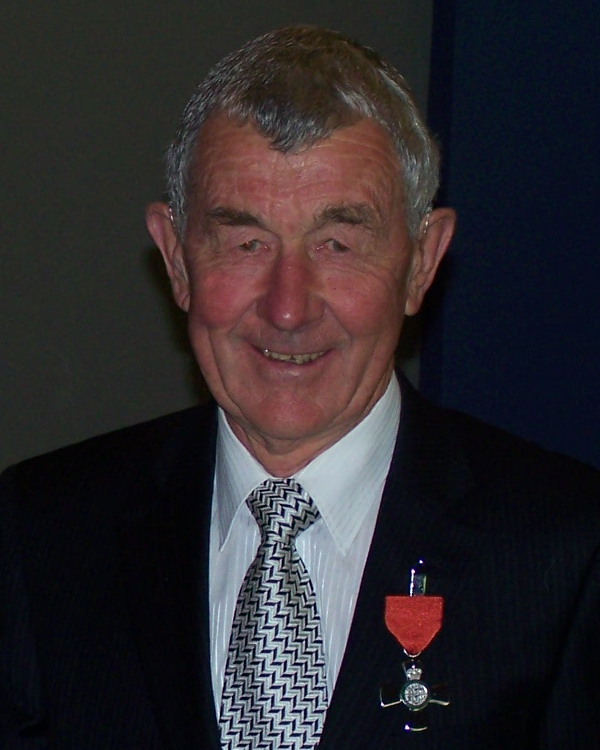
Doug Baldwin

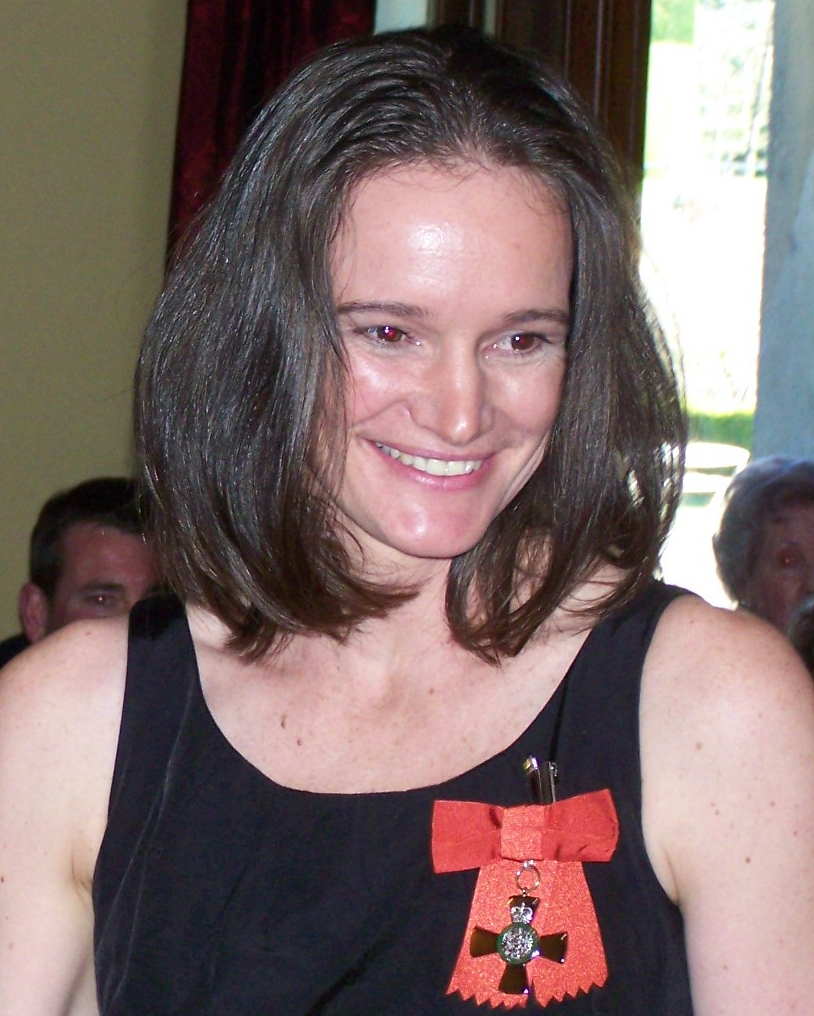
Belinda Charteris

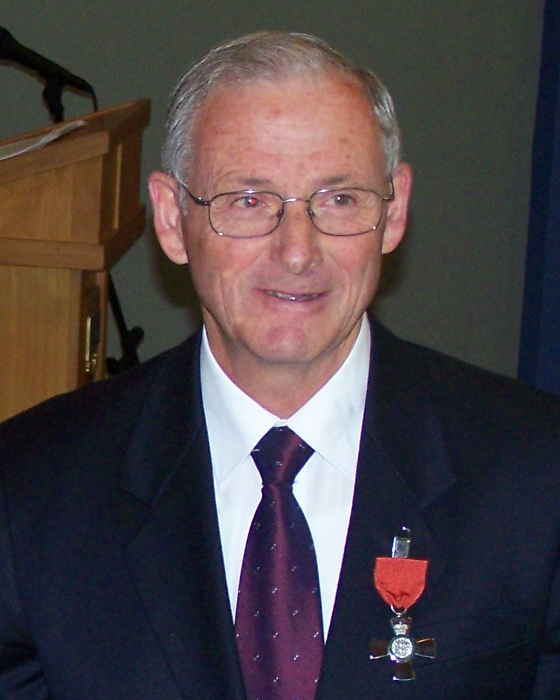
George Clark

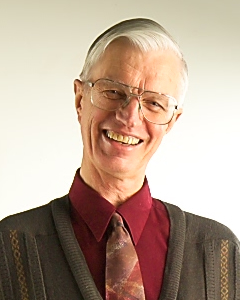
Terry Crooks

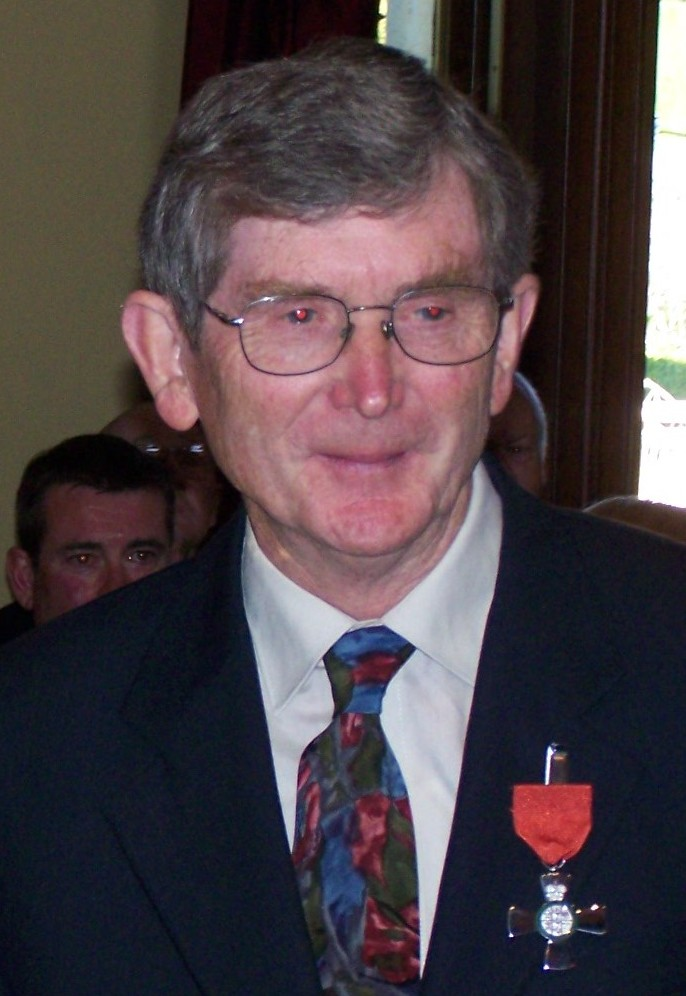
David Elms

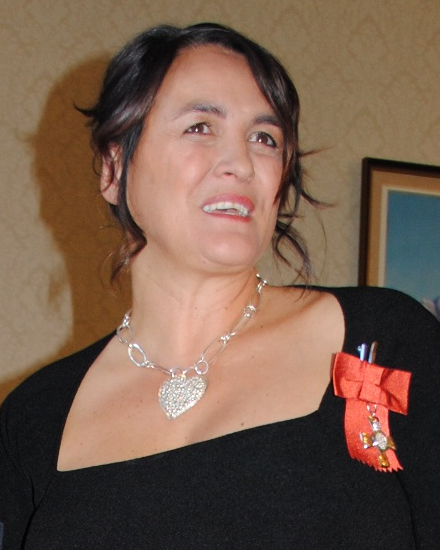
Margaret Foster

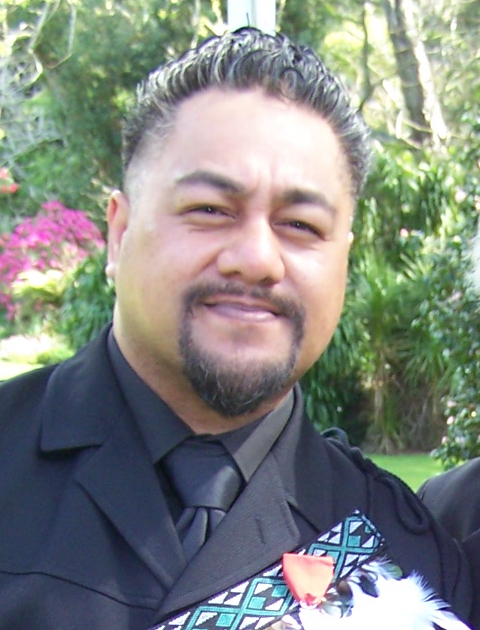
Che Fu

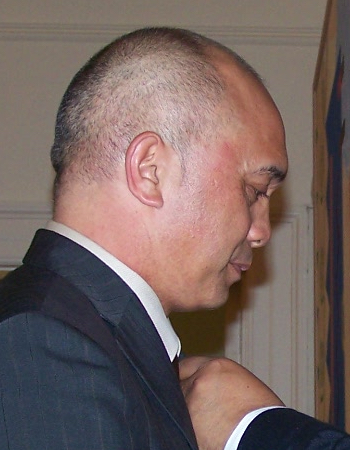
Hone Kouka

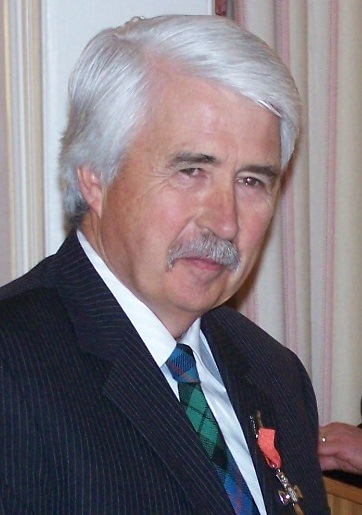
John Morrison

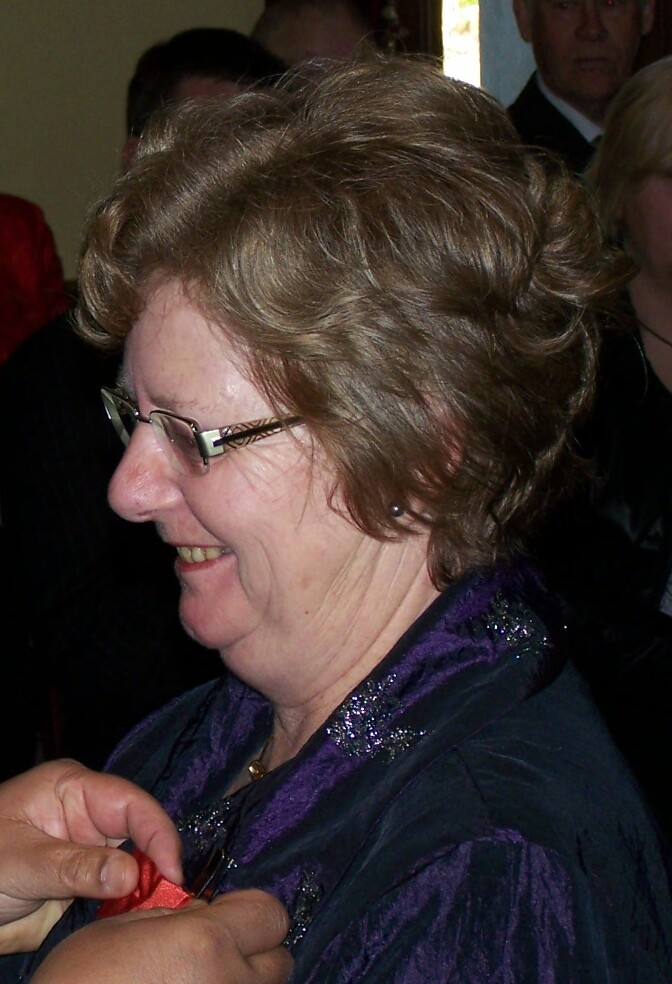
Rosalie Sampson

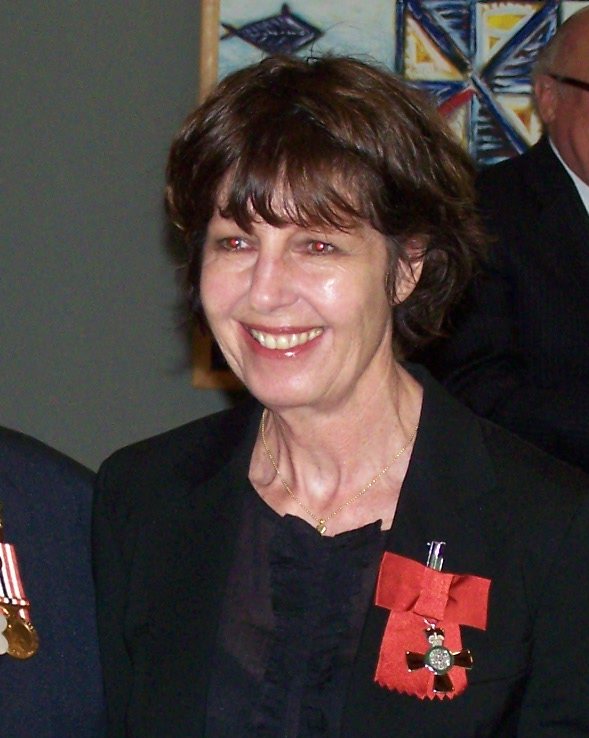
Jane Ussher

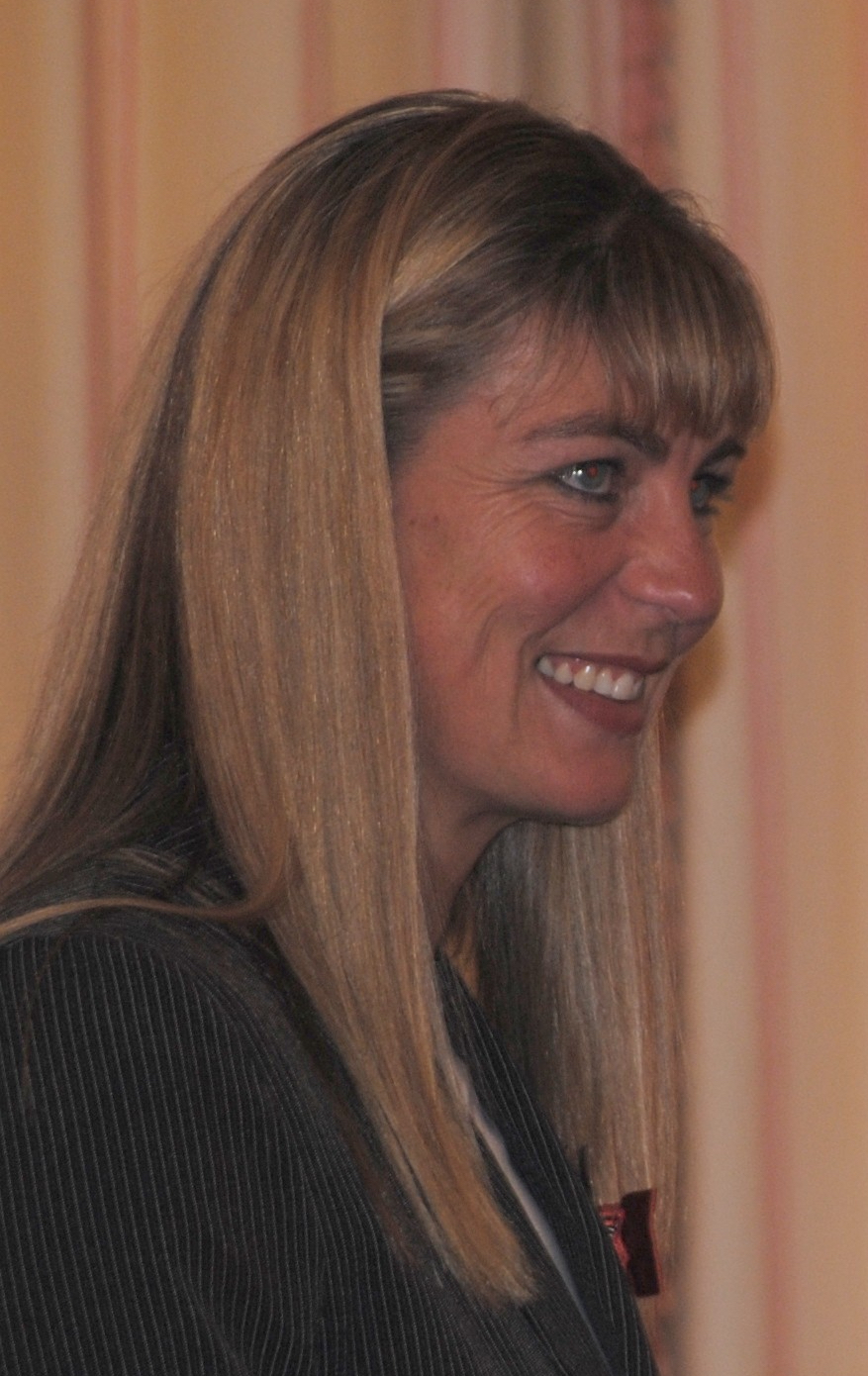
Irene van Dyk

== Companion of the Queen's Service Order (QSO) ==
- Bruce Alexander Aitken – of Dunedin. For services to education and music.
- Valerie Jeanette Burns – of Lower Hutt. For services to early childhood education.
- William John Clarke JP – of Gisborne. For services to local-body affairs and the community.
- Te Uira Graham Kerehoma – of Levin. For services to Māori and the community.
- Ian Montgomery Grant – of Auckland. For services to youth and parenting.
- Peter James Harrison – of Auckland. For services to education.
- Emeritus Professor Leslie Charles Holborow – of Paekākāriki. For services to education and the community.
- Hamilton Manaia Pihopa Kingi MNZM – of Rotorua. For services to the community.
- Inez Haereata Kingi MNZM – of Rotorua. For services to the community.
- Jane Kominik – of Wellington. For services to the Ministry for Culture and Heritage.
- Diana Elizabeth Robinson – of Christchurch. For services to the Child Cancer Foundation.
- Kaa Kataraina Kathleen Williams – of Auckland. For services to Māori.
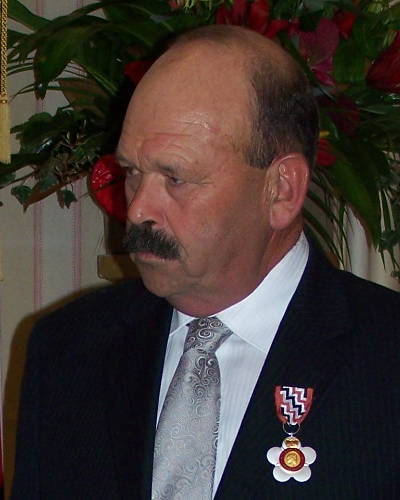
John Clarke

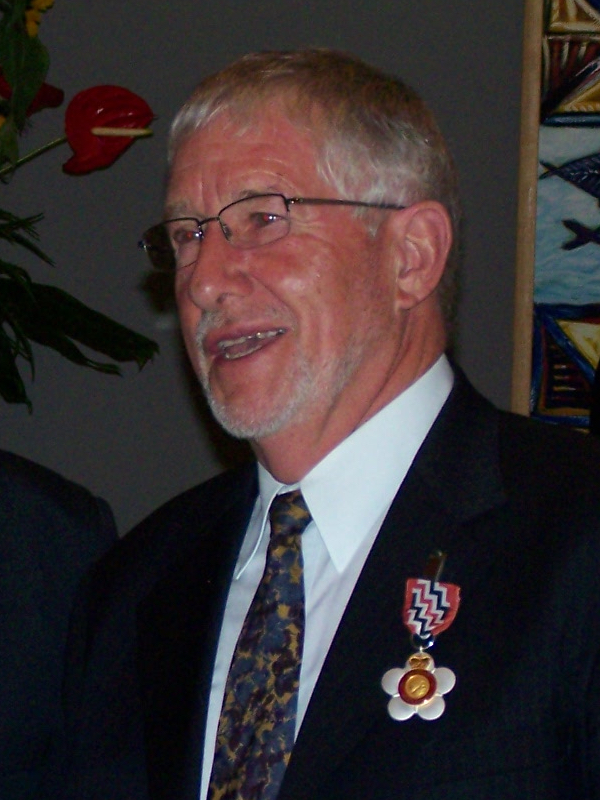
Ian Grant

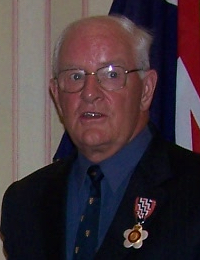
Les Holborow

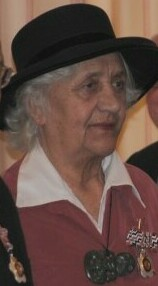
Inez Kingi

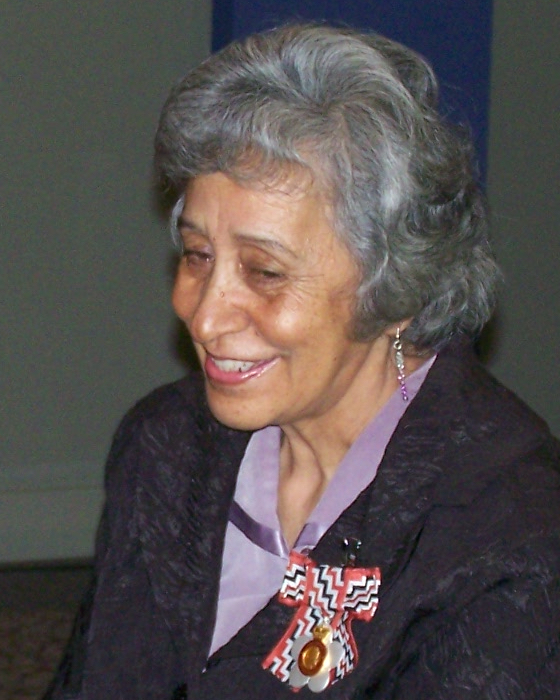
Kaa Williams

== Queen's Service Medal (QSM) ==
- Charles Michael Aamodt – of Upper Hutt. For services to the community.
- Stanley John Askew – of Ōmāpere. For services to the community.
- Ross Alan Barnaby – senior sergeant, New Zealand Police, of North Shore. For services to the New Zealand Police.
- Derek Quentin Battersby JP – of Waitakere (West Auckland). For services to local-body affairs.
- Clive Bibby – of Tolaga Bay. For services to the community.
- William Alan Boniface – of Warkworth. For services to the community.
- Robyn Boswell – of Whangārei. For services to education.
- Michael Edward Brooke – of New Plymouth. For services to sport and the community.
- Mervyn Burdge Brown – of Masterton. For services to the community.
- Murray Carey – of Whitianga. For services to brass bands and soccer.
- Shirley May Gwynneth Caspari – of Hamilton. For services to the community.
- Ian Brackenbury Channell (The Wizard of New Zealand) – of Christchurch. For services to the community.
- John Hugh Clayton JP – of Ikamatua. For services to local-body affairs and the community.
- Keith Richard Crate – of Taupō. For services to cycling.
- Elisabeth May Cunningham – of Dunedin. For services to the community.
- Graeme Edwin Dabb JP – of Auckland. For services to the Filipino community.
- Nguyen Phu Dang JP – of Manukau. For services to the Vietnamese community.
- Valerie Myrtle Dell – of Napier. For services to women and the community.
- Kindra Velvet Douglas – of Nelson. For services to the community.
- John Dallin Dunlop – of Napier. For services to astronomy and the community.
- Dr Lorna Christine Te Aroha Dyall – of Auckland. For services to Māori health.
- James Leslie Eyers – of Wanganui. For services to music and the community.
- Pamela Jean Fauvel – of Auckland. For services to youth.
- Lewis Wilson Findlay – of Palmerston North. For services to the community.
- Angus Finlayson JP – of Lower Hutt. For services to local-body affairs and the community.
- Brian Gordon Flintoff – of Nelson. For services to taonga pūoro.
- Ian Lex Forrest – of Auckland. For services to the community.
- Sister Frances Josephine Gibbs – of Wellington. For services to the community.
- Stephen Godfrey Guard – of Nelson. For services to the maritime industry.
- Laly Paroane Haddon – of Wellsford. For services to conservation.
- Olive De Courtenay Hale-Ingram – of Gisborne. For services to the history of New Zealand ceramics.
- Judy Claris Hanbury – of Waitakere. For services to conservation.
- Trevor James Hosking – of Taupō. For services to the conservation of historic places.
- Thomas William Hutchinson – chief fire officer, Kaikohe Volunteer Fire Brigade, of Kaikohe. For services to the New Zealand Fire Service.
- Desmond Victor Jack – of Hamilton. For services to the community.
- Ian Dixon (Jim) James – of Hamilton. For services to orchid growing.
- Roslyn Ann Jerram – of Ōpōtiki. For services to the community.
- Leslie Clifford Johnston JP – of Tuatapere. For services to the community.
- Christine Jennifer King JP – of Manurewa. For services to the community.
- Au'Birthly Kingi – of Manukau. For services to the Pacific Islands community.
- Ernest Bongard Kirk – of Manukau. For services to local-body affairs and the community.
- Naomi Diane Kirk – of Manukau. For services to the community.
- John Alan Lancashire – of Paraparaumu. For services to conservation.
- David Hartley Lind – of Tauranga. For services to conservation and the community.
- Carl Ernest Lutz – of Ōtaki. For services to the community.
- Sally Geraldine Macauley JP – of Kaikohe. For services to local-body affairs and the community.
- Russell Frank Mackereth – chief fire officer, Silverdale Volunteer Fire Brigade, of Orewa. For services to the New Zealand Fire Service.
- Sandra Elizabeth Maclean – of Takanini. For services to senior citizens and the community.
- Lindsay Rihari Waitara MacLeod – of New Plymouth. For services to Māori.
- Kenneth George McKay JP – of North Shore. For services to education and the community.
- Peter McMillan – of Christchurch. For services to the community.
- Alec McNab – of Wanganui. For services to sport.
- Eamon Mark Molloy – of Christchurch. For services to the ethnic community.
- Kevyn Douglas Moore – of Napier. For services to business and the community.
- Margaret Elizabeth Morton – of Seddon. For services to Guiding.
- Emare Emily Rose Nikora – of Tokoroa. For services to Māori.
- Mildred Noakes – of Auckland. For services to the community.
- Richard Anthony Nunns – of Nelson. For services to taonga pūoro.
- Lindsay Gordon Paku JP – of Hastings. For services to Māori and Māori youth.
- Robert Peter Greenwood Parr – of Cambridge. For services to the community.
- Solomon Neil Purcell – of Havelock North. For services to martial arts.
- The Reverend Canon Donald Morris Rangi – of Wellington. For services to the Treasury.
- Julie Te Turi Ranginui – of Wanganui. For services to Māori.
- Robert Brunswick Robertson – chief fire officer, Queenstown Volunteer Brigade, of Queenstown. For services to the community.
- Mele 'Ilaisipa Robson – of Blenheim. For services to the Pacific Islands community and the community.
- Shirley Joan Rudkin – of Christchurch. For services to the community.
- Paul Aaron Sampson – lately principal rural fire officer, of Rotorua. For services to the New Zealand Fire Service.
- Richard Lyal Stark – of Gore. For services to the community.
- Ellen Marion Sartori Stevenson – of Hastings. For services to kindergarten administration.
- Wanda Tate – of Porirua. For services to conservation.
- Bryan Emlyn Ward – community constable, New Zealand Police, of Auckland. For services to the New Zealand Police.
- Monica Hannah Mihingarangi Watson JP – of Hastings. For services to Māori.
- James Taui Himiona Wetere – of Hamilton. For services to the community.
- Raymund Williams – of Tauranga. For services to the community.
- Leslie Charles Winslade – of Taupō. For services to the community.
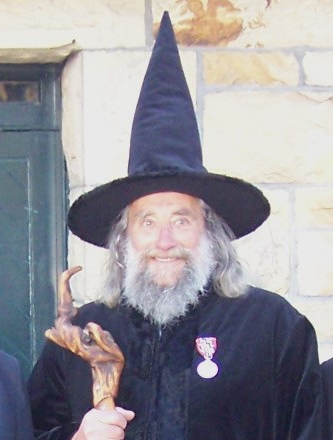
Ian Brackenbury Channell

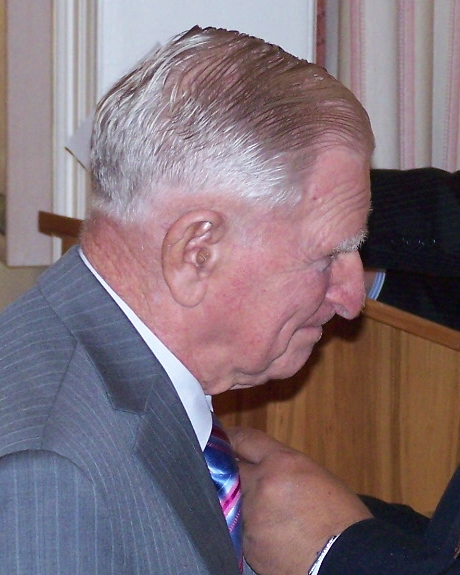
Carl Lutz

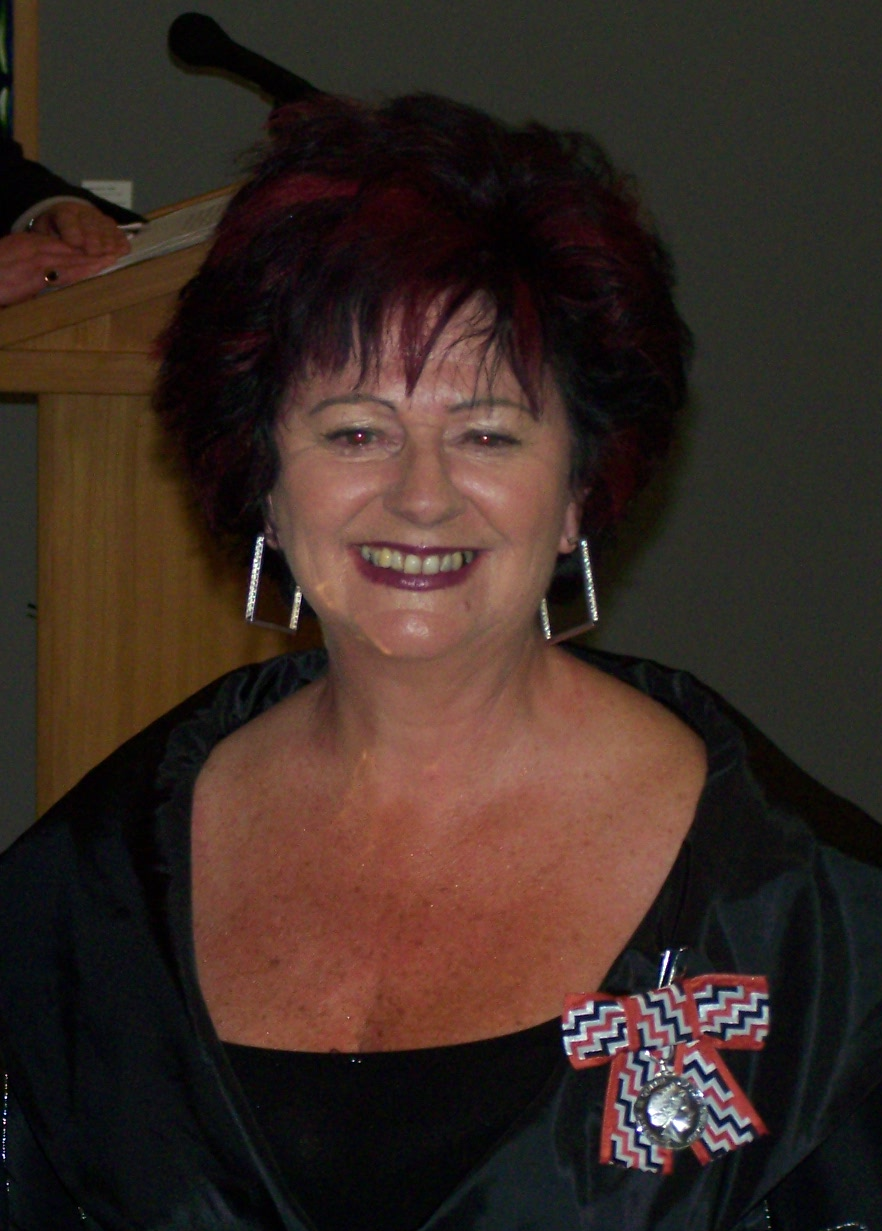
Sally Macauley

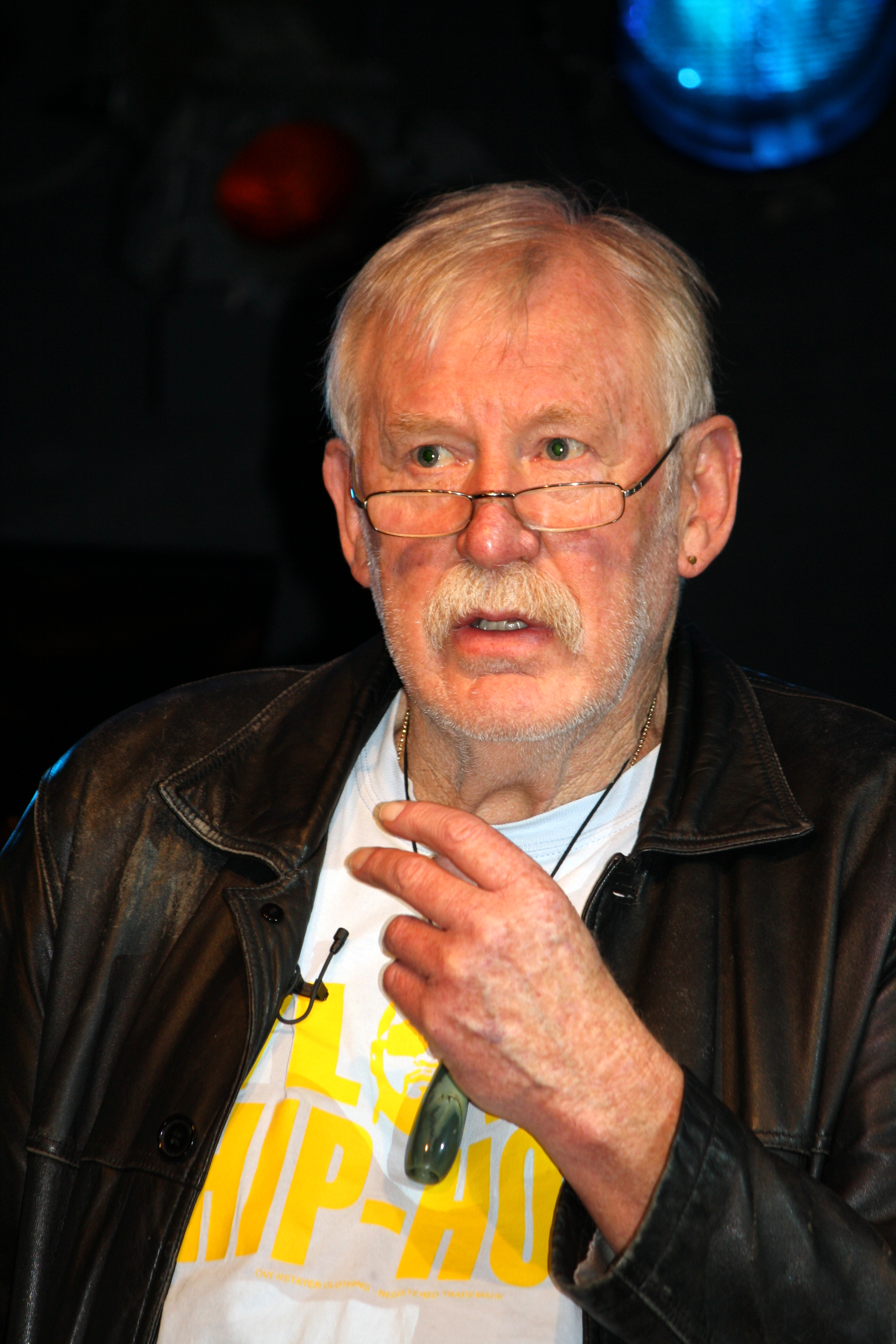
Richard Nunns

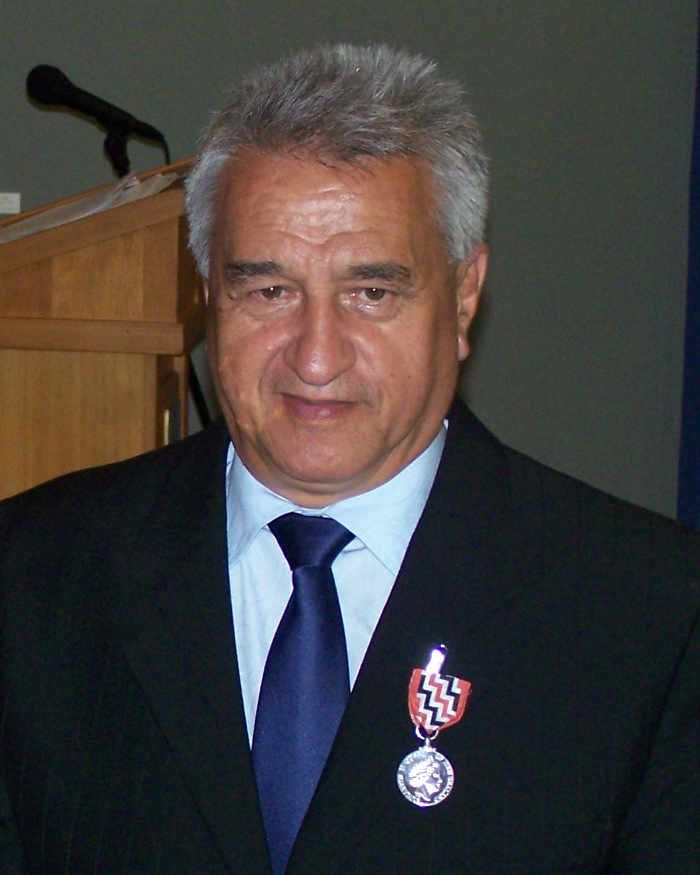
Jim Wetere

== New Zealand Distinguished Service Decoration (NZDSD) ==
- Warrant Officer Electronic Warfare Specialist Thomas Michael Allen MNZM – Royal New Zealand Navy.
- Major Robert William Gillies – Royal New Zealand Army Logistic Regiment.
- Acting Warrant Officer Master at Arms Shirley Anne Patton – Royal New Zealand Navy.
- Major Simon John Caulfield Strombom – Royal New Zealand Armoured Corps (Territorial Force).
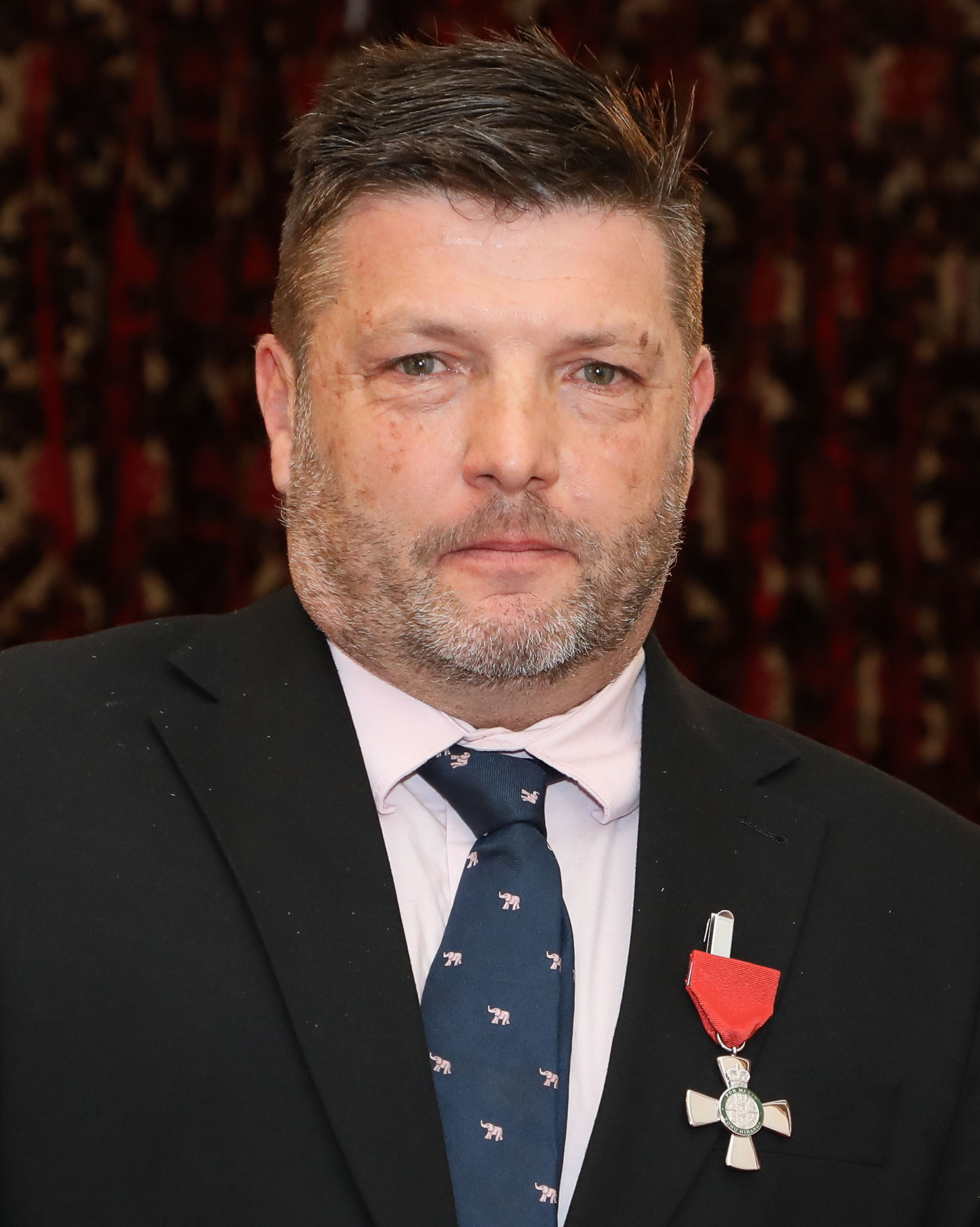
Simon Strombom
