= Kaa Williams =

New Zealand television presenter

Kaa Williams CNZM QSO
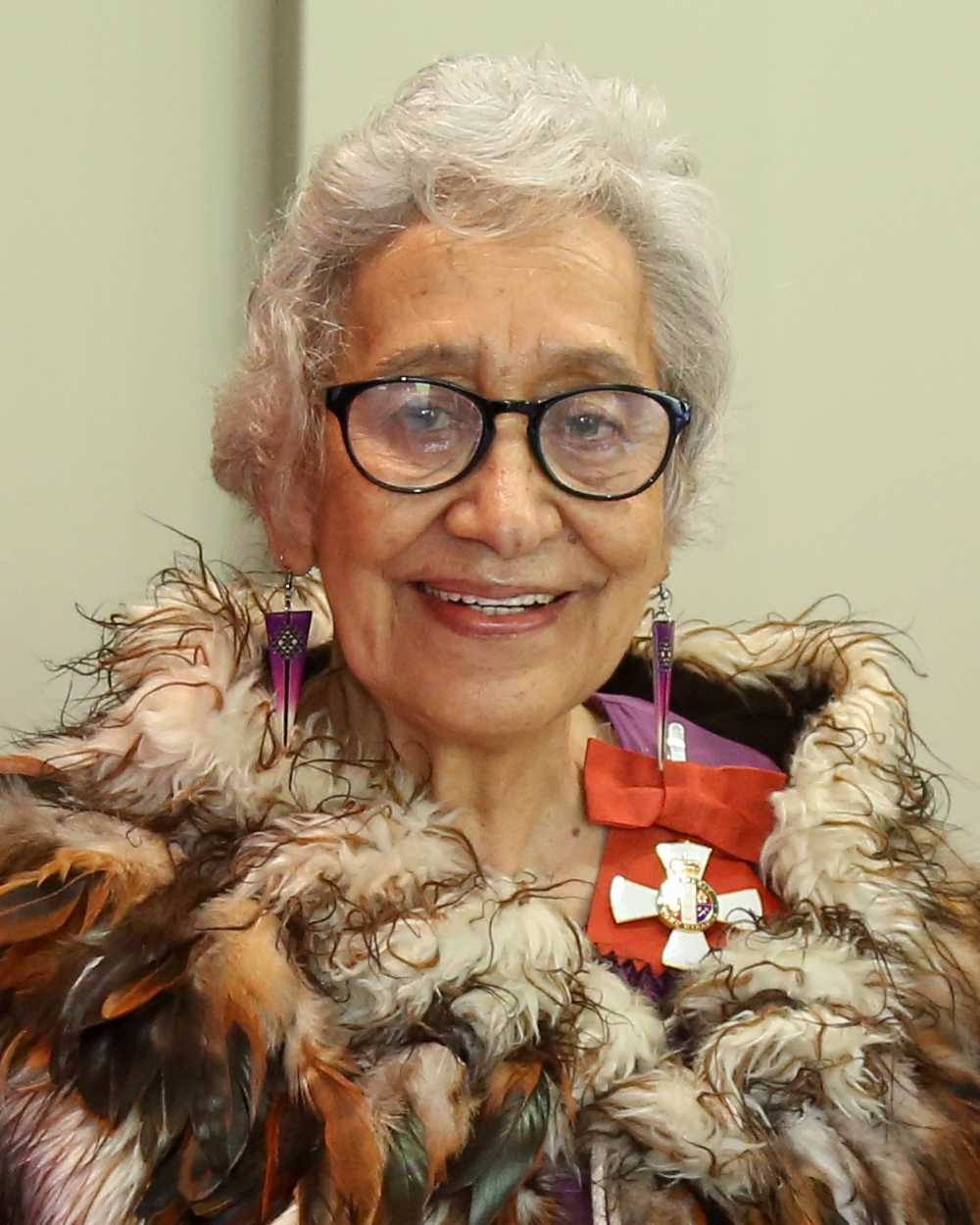
- Williams in 2023
- Occupation: Television presenter
- Notable credit: Manu Rere

Kaa Kataraina Kathleen Williams CNZM QSO is a New Zealand television presenter on Māori Television on the show Manu Rere.

== Biography ==
She is of Ngāi Tuhoe and Ngāti Manawa descent. Williams is a winner of the Best Reo Māori Television Presenter (Female). She has designed the assessment tools for literacy and education, early numeracy programmes and worked for TEA (Tuhoe Education Authority). She has also held positions with Poari Manaaki Early Childhood Education, Te Roopu Māori Āwhina in the Tertiary Education Commission and on advisory groups for the International Research Institute for Māori and Indigenous Education and GEM – Genetic Engineering and Modification.

Williams has a master's degree from the University of Auckland. She is a poutokomanawa (senior lecturer) at Te Whare Wānanga Takiura o Ngā Kura Kaupapa Māori, a Māori tertiary education provider that entails a Rumaki Reo programme and a Bachelor of Education in Kura Kaupapa Māori.

In the 2009 Queen's Birthday Honours, Williams was appointed a Companion of the Queen's Service Order, for services to Māori. In the 2023 New Year Honours, she was appointed a Companion of the New Zealand Order of Merit, for services to Māori and education.
