= Everett Hales =

New Zealand cricketer

Personal information
- Full name: Everett Olive Hales
- Born: 27 October 1876; Wellington, New Zealand
- Died: 1 November 1947 (aged 71); Wellington, New Zealand
- Bowling: Left-arm fast-medium

Domestic team information
- Years: Team
- 1896/97–1909/10: Wellington

Career statistics
Competition	First-class
Matches	20
Runs scored	220
Batting average	8.14
100s/50s	0/0
Top score	48
Balls bowled	2,676
Wickets	60
Bowling average	19.08
5 wickets in innings	4
10 wickets in match	0
Best bowling	6/22
Catches/stumpings	14/–
- Source: Cricinfo, 6 January 2020

Everett Olive Hales (27 October 1876 – 1 November 1947) was a New Zealand cricketer who played first-class cricket for Wellington between 1896 and 1910. He was later a senior public servant.

== Life and career ==
Everett Hales was educated at Wellington College, Wellington, and joined the Public Trustee Office in Wellington in 1894. In 1921 he became Assistant Public Trustee. In 1934 he was appointed Public Trustee.

Hales was a fast-medium left-arm bowler who took a long run-up and was notable for the swing he achieved in his deliveries. He took 5 for 41 and 1 for 16 when Wellington gained their first away victory against Canterbury in Christchurch in January 1901. His best figures were 6 for 22 and 3 for 20 in Wellington's victory over Hawke's Bay in December the same year.

Hales also represented Wellington at rugby union, and was later chairman of Wellington Rugby Union.
