= Charles Benbow =

New Zealand cricketer

Personal information
- Full name: Charles Albert Benbow
- Born: 1870; Solihull, Warwickshire, England
- Died: 29 March 1912 (aged 41); New Plymouth, New Zealand

Domestic team information
- Years: Team
- 1891/92–1896/97: Wellington

Career statistics
Competition	First-class
Matches	6
Runs scored	54
Batting average	9.00
100s/50s	0/0
Top score	30
Balls bowled	518
Wickets	17
Bowling average	11.05
5 wickets in innings	0
10 wickets in match	0
Best bowling	4/9
Catches/stumpings	2/-
- Source: Cricinfo, 4 March 2018

Charles Albert Benbow (1870 – 29 March 1912) was a cricketer who played first-class cricket for Wellington in New Zealand from 1891 to 1897.

== Life and career ==
Charles Benbow was born in England and migrated with his family in the 1870s to New Zealand, where his father was the manager of South British Insurance in Wellington. He attended Wellington College, then joined the AMP Society.

Benbow married Alice Birch in Wellington in March 1902. In 1905 they moved to New Plymouth, where he managed the new branch of the AMP Society. He and his wife had a daughter and a son. He died of pneumonia in New Plymouth on 29 March 1912 after a period of ill-health. His funeral on 31 March was the largest in New Plymouth for some years.

== Cricket career ==
In his first first-class match Benbow was Wellington's most successful bowler in their one-wicket victory over Nelson, taking 3 for 35 and 4 for 31. His best first-class figures were 4 for 9 (off 12 overs) against Fiji in 1894–95.
