= Jonathan Harlen =

New Zealand author and musician

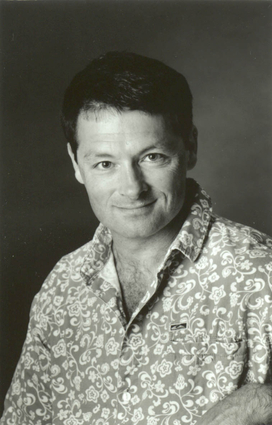
- Jonathan Harlen
- Born: Christchurch, New Zealand
- Occupation: Writer

Jonathan Harlen is a New Zealand-born author, academic and musician now resident in Australia. He has published more than 30 novels for adults, young adults, and children. He has won numerous awards for young adult fiction including the Wilderness Society Literature Award, the NSW Office of Multicultural Affairs Literature Award, the Australian Association of Family Therapists Book Award, and the Royal Society for the Blind Talking Book Award. His novels have twice been recognised as Notable Books by the Children's Book Council of Australia, and have been published in nine countries.

== Early life ==
Harlen was born in Wellington, and attended Wellington College, and Victoria University of Wellington, where he majored in English and political science. He completed his final year of university study in Jerusalem, Israel, after falling in love with an Israeli girl. He settled in Australia in 1986, where he worked initially as a journalist. He wrote comedy for radio station Triple J for two years and played in a variety of blues and rock bands before turning to writing fiction.

== Literary career ==
Harlen was the recipient of a Fellowship from the Australia Council for the Arts in 1996 In the same year a play based on his novel The Lion And the Lamb toured high schools in Victoria. He has been Writer-in-Residence at Dromkeen, Brisbane Grammar School, Ipswich Grammar School, Essendon Grammar School, Knox Grammar School, Mitchelton State High School, Tin Can Bay High School, and the Fremantle Arts Centre. He has spoken and given workshops at many schools and literature festivals throughout Australia.

Several of his children's books have been bestsellers in Australia. In the 1990s and early 2000s his young adult novels regularly featured as set texts for Year 7-9 English students in Victoria and New South Wales. His work has been published in Italy, Denmark, South Korea, France, the United Kingdom, The USA, Canada and New Zealand.

In October 2017 Harlen was artist in residence at Southern Cross University, Lismore, New South Wales.

== Music ==
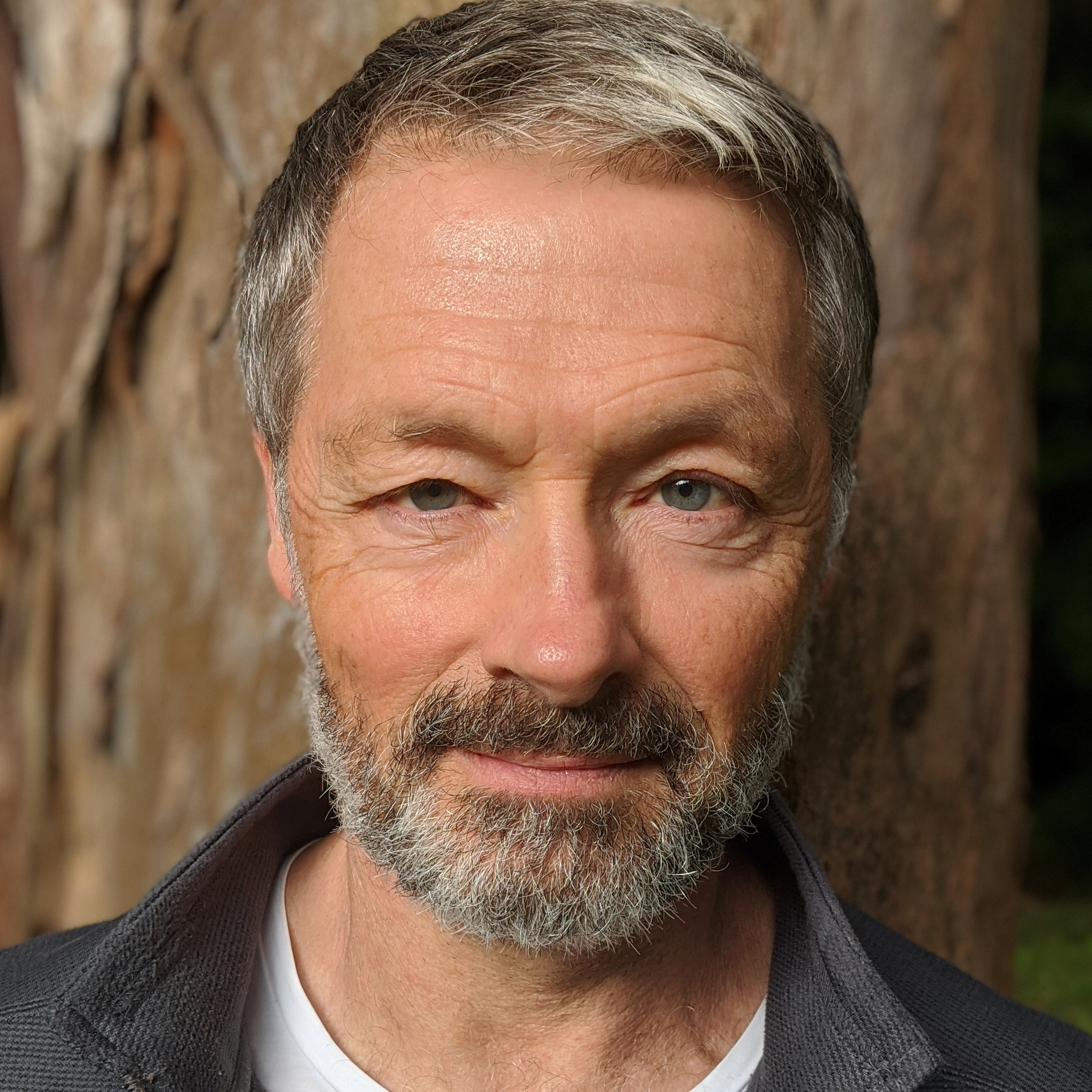
Harlen in 2021

in 2020 Harlen released an album of contemporary folk rock music,Field of Dreams, under the pseudonym Jack Straw. The album features eight of Harlen's original songs and explores a number of genres including blues, folk, roots, and folk rock. Fellow band members include Matt Day (guitar), James Pattugalan (drums) and Luke Ferguson (bass). A song from the album, Whispery Grey, was a finalist in the Australian Songwriters Association (ASA) Folk Song of the Year competition in 2021. Harlen continues to gig solo, mainly in the Northern NSW region.

== Phd ==
in December 2021 Harlen received his Doctorate of Philosophy in Law from Southern Cross University for a thesis entitled "Woven Law: Te Nakahi and the Re-Storying of Sovereignty in Aotearoa/New Zealand". He has lectured in law at Southern Cross University since 2019 and maintains a research interest in Intellectual Property as well as Treaty of Waitangi issues.

== Legal Practice ==
Harlen was admitted as a Solicitor of the Supreme Court of NSW in February 2009. He practiced for 10 years as a solicitor advocate, specialising in tort law, succession law, and intellectual property law. He currently holds an Open Education Resource (OER) grant to write an open education textbook for succession law students. This is due for publication in 2026. He intends to follow this with a similar open education resource for students of intellectual property law.

== Awards and honours ==
- 1996 Royal Blind Society Talking Book Award
- 1994 Wilderness Society Environment Award
- 1994 Family Award for Children's Literature
- 1994 NSW Office of Multicultural Affairs Literature Award (Fracture Zone)
- 1994 Children's Book Council Notable Book (Fracture Zone)
- 1992 Office of Multicultural Affairs Literature Award (The Lion And the Lamb)
- 1992 NSW Premier's Award (short-list, Young Adult fiction, The Lion and the Lamb)
- 1992 Children's Book Council Notable Book (The Lion and the Lamb)
- 1991 The Australian Books of the Year (short-list, Adult Fiction, The Greening of Copeland Park)

== Published works ==
- The Greening of Copeland Park (1991)
- The Lion And The Lamb (1992)
- Fracture Zone (1994)
- Mango (1994)
- Lucy and the Whale (1994)
- The Yowie Thief (1995)
- Blackeye (1995)
- The Dream of the Dusky Dolphin (1995)
- The Carriers (1996)
- Rincorrendo La Luna (Italy, 1996)
- La Morsure (France, 1998)
- The Crescent Moon (1998)
- Champions (1999)
- Kristen (2002)
- Ildfleur (Denmark, 2002)
- The Crescent Moon (South Korea, 2002)
- Circus Berzerkus (2003)
- The Cockroach War (2004)
- Drop Dead Mad Dog Fred (2004)
- The Mad Goat Mystery (2005)
- Ziggy and the Plugfish (2005)
- The Instant Tan (2007)
- The Plague (USA, 2008)
- Dangerous Games (2008)
- Blood Sports (2008)
- Playing with Fire (United Kingdom, 2010)
- Dangerous Games (United Kingdom, 2010)
- Fred Cane Pazzo (Italy, 2011)
