= Murray Hill (seed technologist) =

New Zealand seed technologist (1939–2020)

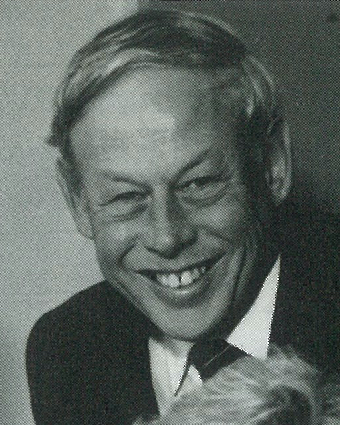
- Hill in 1993
- Born: Murray John Hill; 5 October 1939; Wellington, New Zealand
- Died: 10 June 2020 (aged 80); Takapuna, New Zealand
- Education: Massey University
- Spouse: Karen Ann O'Reilly (m. 1989; died 2014)
- Scientific career
- Fields: Seed technology
- Workplaces: Massey University; Lincoln University
- Thesis: A study of seed production in 'Grasslands Ruanui' perennial ryegrass (Lolium Perenne L.) 'Grasslands Kahu' Timothy (Pheleum Pratense L.) prairie grass (Bromus Unioloides H.B.K.) (1971)
- Doctoral advisor: Bramwell Watkin

Murray John Hill (5 October 1939 – 10 June 2020) was a New Zealand seed technologist. He was the inaugural director of the Seed Technology Centre at Massey University between 1976 and 1997, and established the New Zealand Seed Technology Institute at Lincoln University in 1998.

== Biography ==
Born in Wellington on 5 October 1939, Hill was the son of Helen Christina Hill (née McKenzie) and William Roy Hill. He was educated at Wellington College from 1953 to 1958, and went on to study at Massey University between 1959 and 1970, completing bachelor's and master's degrees in agricultural science, a PhD on ryegrass seed production, and a Diploma of Horticulture.

During his doctoral studies, Hill worked at the Department of Agriculture's Seed Testing Station in Palmerston North, and he eventually rose to become officer-in-charge. In 1976, he returned to Massey to establish the university's Seed Technology Centre, serving as its director until 1997, and as professor of seed and crop science. In 1998, he moved to Lincoln University to become professor of seed and crop science, and set up the New Zealand Seed Technology Institute. He retired from Lincoln in 2004, moving to the University of Queensland Gatton Campus where he and his wife Karen Hill established the Seed Technology Institute Australia and its commercial arm, the Queensland Seed Technology Laboratory, in 2002.

Karen Hill died on 25 August 2014, and Murray Hill returned to New Zealand to live in retirement on a lifestyle block at Gladstone in the Wairarapa. He died in Takapuna on 10 June 2020.

== Awards ==
In 1996, Hill was awarded the Royal Society of New Zealand Science and Technology Medal.

== Selected publications ==
- Hill, M. J.; Johnstone, C. R. (1985). "Heat damage and drying effects on seed quality". In Hare, M. D.; Brock, J. L. (eds.). Producing Herbage Seeds (PDF). Grassland Research and Practice Series. Palmerston North: New Zealand Grassland Association. pp. 53–57.
- Hill, Murray, ed. (1999). The Drying and Storage of Grain and Herbage Seeds. Foundation for Arable Research. ISBN 0473060272.
- Greven, M. M.; McKenzie, B. A.; Hampton, J. G.; Hill, M. J.; Sedcole, J. R.; Hill, G. D. (2004). "Factors affecting seed quality in dwarf French bean (Phaseolus vulgaris L.) before harvest maturity". Seed Science and Technology. 32 (3): 797–811. doi:10.15258/sst.2004.32.3.15.
