= Frank Joplin =

New Zealand cricketer

Personal information
- Born: 27 February 1894; Wellington, New Zealand
- Died: 1 March 1984 (aged 90); Wellington, New Zealand
- Batting: Right-handed

Domestic team information
- Years: Team
- 1913/14: Wellington

Career statistics
Competition	First-class
Matches	4
Runs scored	162
Batting average	23.14
100s/50s	0/1
Top score	80
Catches/stumpings	1/–
- Source: Cricinfo, 30 May 2018

Frank Joplin (27 February 1894 – 1 March 1984) was a New Zealand cricketer who played four matches of first-class cricket for Wellington in the 1913-14 season.

Joplin was born in Wellington and attended Wellington College before going to Victoria College for his university studies. A weak heart owing to childhood rheumatic fever prevented him from serving in the armed forces in World War I. He became a teacher, taking up a position at Wellington College.

A middle-order batsman, Joplin's most successful first-class match was in January 1914 against Otago, when he top-scored for Wellington with 80 and 22 in their 85-run victory. In a senior club match in Wellington in 1914-15 he scored 199 not out in four hours.

He married Mary Feist in Wellington in December 1921. Their son Graham Joplin was a prominent endocrinologist.
