= Ernest Bezzant =

New Zealand cricketer

Personal information
- Full name: Ernest Frederic Bezzant
- Born: 26 October 1916; Wellington, New Zealand
- Died: 1 October 2002 (aged 85); Brisbane, Australia
- Batting: Right-handed

Domestic team information
- Years: Team
- 1943/44: Wellington

Career statistics
| Competition | First-class |
|---|---|
| Matches | 4 |
| Runs scored | 218 |
| Batting average | 27.25 |
| 100s/50s | 0/2 |
| Top score | 78 |
| Catches/stumpings | 0/– |
- Source: Cricinfo, 23 September 2011

Ernest Frederic Bezzant (26 October 1916 – 1 October 2002) was a New Zealand cricketer who played four first-class matches in New Zealand in the 1940s.

Bezzant was born in Wellington and educated at Wellington College. He served in the Royal New Zealand Air Force during World War II.

He made his first-class debut for the Royal New Zealand Air Force cricket team in April 1943, scoring 63 and 78 out of team totals of 128 and 278. He played three first-class friendly matches in 1943–44, including two for Wellington, but did not reach 50 in any of them.
