= Chris Spence (author) =

British/New Zealand writer

Christopher Robert Spence
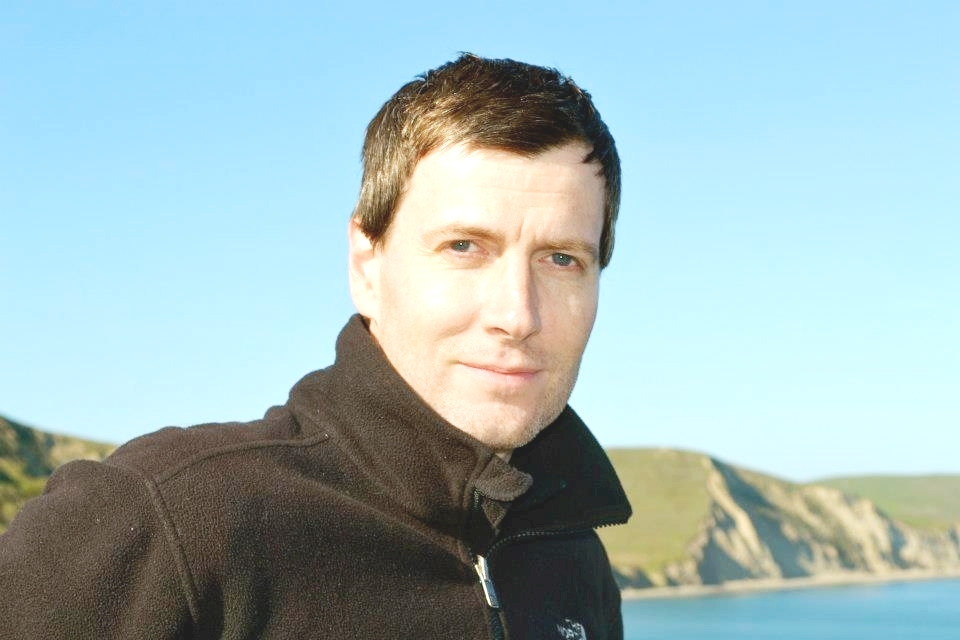
- Chris Spence (2018)
- Born: 8 June 1970 (age 56); Yorkshire, United Kingdom
- Occupation: Writer
- Spouse: Nicole Eppolito Spence
- Children: 3
- Website: http://chrisspenceauthor.com/

Chris Spence (born 8 June 1970) is a British / New Zealand author and advisor on climate change and other environmental issues. He has worked internationally on sustainable development, conservation, climate change, and health policy. In 2005, his first non-fiction book, Global Warming: Personal Solutions for a Healthy Planet, was published. More recent books include Rock Happy, a series of novels with dystopian and environmental themes (2021-2024). He co-wrote and co-edited Heroes of Environmental Diplomacy (2022), a non-fiction book on the roles of individuals in global diplomacy, with author and futurist Felix Dodds. In 2025, Spence and Dodds co-wrote Environmental Lobbying at the United Nations: A Guide to Protecting Our Planet, published by Routledge.

== Biography ==
Spence was born in 1970 in the city of Wakefield in Yorkshire, England and grew up in nearby Bingley. His family moved to Wellington, New Zealand when he was 12, where he attended Wellington College and later Victoria University of Wellington, graduating with BA and MA degrees in political science and history.

== Career ==
In the 1990s, Spence worked as a political researcher in the Labour Research Unit of the New Zealand parliament at the time when Helen Clark was leader of the Labour Party. He later worked as a journalist for Consumer magazine in New Zealand, where he won the TUANZ award for best article on technology. In 1997, Spence became the youngest ever executive director of the New Zealand Drug Foundation, a public health advocacy/education group.

In 1998, Spence left New Zealand and eventually moved to New York, where his professional focus shifted to international diplomacy, particularly the United Nations negotiations on climate change and other environmental law issues. He worked as a consultant and advisor for a range of international organizations, including the International Institute for Sustainable Development (IISD) where he was recruited by Langston J. Goree VI (Kimo) the founder of the Earth Negotiations Bulletin.He also consulted for the United Nations Development Programme (UNDP). From 2005 to 2012, Spence was deputy director of IISD's Earth Negotiations Bulletin, leading teams of experts at many United Nations climate change negotiations and other meetings. In 2012, Spence moved to the West Coast to live in California.

In 2012, Spence joined the Golden Gate National Parks Conservancy in San Francisco, running their policy and innovation team and later becoming Executive Vice President for Strategy and Partnerships. In this role, he oversaw five departments and a large staff responsible for ensuring Golden Gate National Parks delivered inspiring programs and park experiences to the community. He left in 2018 to resume his writing, environmental consulting and musical interests with a new band, TDK.

Spence has authored and co-authored several books. His book Global Warming: Personal Solutions for a Healthy Planet was published in 2005. It drew from Spence's experiences with the International Institute for Sustainable Development, and took issue with the Bush Administration's climate change policies. Spence has also been published in the American British Business Magazine, the New York Daily News, and Discover magazine.

== Personal life ==
Spence lives in northern California with his wife and three children, having previously lived in Dublin, Ireland, New York City, London, and Wellington, New Zealand. He is originally from Yorkshire, England. Spence returns regularly to New Zealand.
