= Ernie Dodd =

New Zealand rugby union player

- Born: Ernest Henry Dodd; 21 March 1880 Dunedin, New Zealand
- Died: 11 September 1918 (aged 38) France
- Height: 1.75 m (5 ft 9 in)
- School: Wellington College
- Occupation: Clerk

Rugby union career
- Position: Hooker
Provincial / State sides
Years	Team	Apps	(Points)
1901–05	Wellington	45	
International career
Years	Team	Apps	(Points)
1901, 1905	New Zealand	1	(0)

Ernest Henry Dodd (21 March 1880 – 11 September 1918) was a New Zealand rugby union player. A hooker, Dodd represented Wellington at a provincial level in 45 matches between 1901 and 1905, and appeared in the first ever Ranfurly Shield challenge in 1904. He made three appearances for the New Zealand national side (later known as the "All Blacks"): two games in 1901; and the test match against the touring Australian team at Tahuna Park, Dunedin, in 1905.

Dodd enlisted for service with the New Zealand Expeditionary Force in February 1917, and rose to the rank of lance sergeant in the New Zealand Rifle Brigade. Dodd enlisted (aged 36) as a widower with 3 children, predeceased by his 2 wives Edith Violet Wills and Ruby Frances Bolton who died in their late 20s of sepsis and tuberculosis, respectively. He was killed in action in France on 9 September 1918, and was buried at the Metz-en-Couture Communal Cemetery British Extension.
