= Mayor of Masterton =

Head of the district council of Masterton, New Zealand

- Coat of arms of Masterton

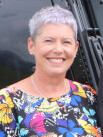
- Incumbent; Bex Johnson since 2025
- Style: His/Her Worship
- Term length: Three years
- Inaugural holder: R. G. Williams
- Formation: 1877
- Deputy: Craig Bowyer
- Salary: $133,530
- Website: Official website

The mayor of Masterton is the head of the municipal government of Masterton, New Zealand, and presides over the Masterton District Council. The mayor is directly elected using First Past the Post. The mayor is assisted by the deputy mayor of Masterton.

The current mayor is Bex Johnson, elected in October 2025.

== List of mayors ==
	Name	Portrait	Term
1	Robert Williams		1877–1878
2	Duncan McGregor		1878–1879
3	Edwin Feist		1879–1880
4	Alfred Renall		1880–1881
5	Alfred Bish		1881–1883
6	William Lowes		1883–1884
7	Myer Caselberg		1884–1887
(4)	Alfred Renall		1887–1889
8	George Heron		1889–1890
9	Charles Aylmer Pownall		1890–1893
(8)	George Heron		1893–1896
(9)	Charles Aylmer Pownall		1896–1898
(8)	George Heron		1898–1899
(9)	Charles Aylmer Pownall		1899–1902
10	Phillip Luscombe Hollings		1902–1903
11	James Moore Coradine		1903–1904
12	Joseph Renall		1904–1907
(11)	James Moore Coradine		1907–1908
(10)	Phillip Luscombe Hollings		1908–1910
(11)	James Moore Coradine		1910–1919
(12)	Joseph Renall		1919–1921
13	Orlando Pragnell		1921–1925
14	Thomas Jordan		1925–1944
15	William Kemp		1944–1953
16	Archibald Keir		1953
17	Ted Coddington		1953–1955
18	Bill Marchbank		1955–1962
19	Norm Tankersley		1962–1974
20	Frank Cody		1974–1986
21	Bob Francis		1986–2007
22	Garry Daniell		2007–2013
23	Lyn Patterson		2013–2022
24	Gary Caffell		2022–2025
25	Bex Johnson		2025–present

== List of deputy mayors ==
Name	Term	Mayor
Joseph Renall	1902–c. 1903	Pownall
Joseph Renall	1902–c. 1903	Hollings
Edgar George Eton	21 June – 24 June 1904 (Note: Eton was appointed deputy mayor at the council meeting on 21 June 1904 due to the mayor's scheduled absence at a New Zealand Dairy Association conference in Palmerston North. The mayor returned from the conference on the morning of 24 June.)	Renall
Edwin Feist	November 1906 – March 1907 (Note: In October 1906, the mayor, Joseph Renall, left Masterton before his term of office was over. He did not resign and was instead granted leave of absence, meaning a deputy mayor had to be appointed to fulfill the role in his absence until the next mayoral election in April 1907. Feist was elected to the role in November 1906, but vacated the position in March 1907, leading to McEwen taking over the role until the election in April.)	Renall
Edward McEwen	March – April 1907	Renall
James Elliott	c. July 1912	Coradine
Frederick William Temple	c. December 1913	Coradine
Frederick William Temple	c. April 1916	Coradine
Frederick William Temple	5 September 1917 (Note: Appointed deputy mayor only for the council meeting on that date due to the mayor's absence from the meeting.)	Coradine
Frederick William Temple	c. December 1917	Coradine
Frederick William Temple	November 1918 – c. January 1919 (Note: Temple was officially appointed deputy mayor on 5 November 1918 due to the mayor's absence in Australia, however, was noted as the deputy mayor as early as on 2 November..)	Coradine
William Candy	c. January 1921	Renall
Frederick William Temple	September 1922 – April 1923 (Note: Officially appointed deputy mayor on 19 September 1922, yet was referred to as in the position as early as on 11 September. Temple was appointed to serve for the rest of the council term, which ended with the municipal elections in April 1923.)	Pragnell
Frederick William Temple	1923–1924	Pragnell
Thomas Jordan	1924	Pragnell
Frederick William Temple	1924–1925	Pragnell
William Kemp	1925–?	Jordan
Unknown	c. 1925–1933	Jordan
W. L. Free	1933–1935	Jordan
William White	1935–1944	Jordan
Joseph Ninnes	1944–1947	Kemp
Archibald Keir	1947–1953	Kemp
Ted Coddington	1953	Keir
Unknown	1953–c. 1980	–
Doug Leigh	fl.1980–1983	Cody
Unknown	c. 1983–1989	–
John McDonald	1989–1995	Francis
Rod McKenzie	1995–2004	Francis
Garry Daniell	2004–2007	Francis
Jane Terpstra	2007–2013	Daniell
Graham McClymont	2013–2022	Patterson
Bex Johnson	2022–2025	Caffell
Craig Bowyer	2025–present	Johnson
