= Frank Luxford =

New Zealand cricketer

Frank Hayes Luxford (3 May 1862 – 1 November 1954) was a New Zealand cricketer who played four first-class matches for Wellington in the 1880s.

Born at Wellington and educated at Wellington College, Luxford was a farmer. A bowler, his best figures in first-class cricket were 5 for 40 for Wellington against Auckland in December 1882.
