= Beaglehole =

Beaglehole or Beauglehole is a Cornish surname. Notable people with this surname include the following:

- Alexander Clifford Beauglehole (1920–2002), Australian farmer, plant collector and naturalist
- Ann Beaglehole (born 1948), Hungarian-born New Zealand historian; former wife of David Beaglehole
- David Beaglehole (1938–2014), New Zealand physicist; former husband of Ann Beaglehole
- Ernest Beaglehole (1906–1965), New Zealand academic, psychologist and ethnographer; brother of John Beaglehole
- Helen Beaglehole (born 1946), New Zealand writer, editor and historian; wife of Tim Beaglehole
- John Beaglehole (1901–1971), New Zealand academic and historian; brother of Ernest Beaglehole
- Ruth Beaglehole (1943–2025), New Zealand-born American educator and advocate for nonviolent parenting
- Steve Beaglehole (born 1960), English football coach
- Tim Beaglehole (1933–2015), New Zealand academic; son of John Beaglehole and husband of Helen Beaglehole
- William Henry Beaglehole (1834–1917), early settler and businessman in the colony of South Australia

== See also ==
- Beaglehole Glacier
