= Jane Ritchie =

New Zealand psychologist and academic (1936–2023)

Jane Ritchie OBE
- Born: Jane Beaglehole; 12 February 1936; Honolulu, Hawaii, U.S.
- Died: 21 April 2023 (aged 87)
- Education: Victoria University of Wellington
- Spouse: James Ritchie
- Scientific career
- Fields: psychology, child-raising
- Workplaces: University of Waikato
- Thesis: Maori Families: an Exploratory Study in Wellington City
- Relatives: Ernest Beaglehole (father); David Beaglehole (brother); John Beaglehole (uncle); Tim Beaglehole (cousin); Ruth Beaglehole (sister)

Jane Ritchie OBE (née Beaglehole; 12 February 1936 – 21 April 2023) was a New Zealand psychology academic and expert of child-raising. She was an emeritus professor at the University of Waikato. She was the first woman to graduate with a PhD in psychology from a New Zealand university.

== Biography ==
Ritchie was born on 12 February 1936 in Honolulu as Jane Beaglehole, the daughter of psychologist and ethnologist Ernest Beaglehole. The family lived in New Zealand from 1937. She received her education at Karori School and Wellington Girls' College. She then studied at Victoria University and obtained a Bachelor of Arts in 1956, a Master of Arts in 1957, and a PhD in 1963. Her 1957 master thesis was titled Childhood in Rakau: A Study of the First Five Years of Life and the PhD, submitted in 1962, had the title Maori Families: an Exploratory Study in Wellington City. While at Victoria, she met and married James Ritchie, and the two collaborated on almost all their future research, just as her parents had done.

They both moved to the University of Waikato, and both rose to full professor. She was a postdoctoral research fellow from 1973 to 1975, a lecturer from 1976 to 1979 and a senior lecturer from 1980 to 1984. She was promoted to associate professor in 1985, and in 1995 was appointed a professor.

James Ritchie died in 2009 and Jane retired in 2010. Two younger brothers have achieved notability. David Beaglehole (1938–2014) was a physicist at Victoria University. Robert Beaglehole (born 1945) is an emeritus professor in epidemiology at the University of Auckland. Jane Ritchie died on April 21, 2023, at the age of 87.

== Awards and honours ==
In the 1989 New Year Honours, Ritchie was appointed an Officer of the Order of the British Empire, for services to women, education and the community. In 2017, she was selected as one of the Royal Society of New Zealand's "150 women in 150 words".

== Selected works ==
- Ritchie, Jane. Childhood in Rakau: the first five years of life. No. 10. Victoria Univ., 1957.
- Ritchie, Jane, and James E. Ritchie. Child rearing patterns in New Zealand. AH & AW Reed, 1970.
- Ritchie, Jane. Chance to be equal. Cape Catley, 1978
- Ritchie, Jane, and James E. Ritchie. Spare the Rod, Allen and Unwin, 1981
- Ritchie, Jane, and James E. Ritchie. Violence in New Zealand. Huia Publishers, 1993.
- Ritchie, Jane, and James E. Ritchie. The next generation: Child rearing in New Zealand. Penguin Books, 1997.
