= 2006 New Year Honours (New Zealand) =

Annual awards for New Zealanders

- Previous: 2005 Queen's Birthday Honours; Next: 2006 Queen's Birthday Honours
- Type: New Zealand royal honours: New Zealand Order of Merit; Queen's Service Order; Queen's Service Medal
- Date: 31 December 2005
- Country: New Zealand
- Total recipients: 204

The 2006 New Year Honours in New Zealand were appointments by Elizabeth II in her right as Queen of New Zealand, on the advice of the New Zealand government, to various orders and honours to reward and highlight good works by New Zealanders, and to celebrate the passing of 2005 and the beginning of 2006. They were announced on 31 December 2005.

The recipients of honours are listed here as they were styled before their new honour.

== New Zealand Order of Merit ==
=== Principal Companion (PCNZM) ===
- Professor Paul Terence Callaghan – of Wellington. For services to science.
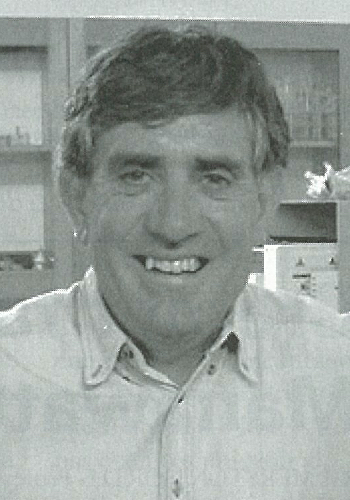
Paul Callaghan

=== Distinguished Companion (DCNZM) ===
- Emeritus Professor Judith Mary Caroline Binney CNZM – of Auckland. For services to historical research.
- David Rendel Kingston Gascoigne CBE – of Wellington. For services to the arts and business.
- Ralph James Norris – of Sydney, Australia. For services to business.
- The Right Honourable Andrew Patrick Charles Tipping – of Wellington. For services as a judge of the Supreme Court and Court of Appeal of New Zealand.
Judith Binney

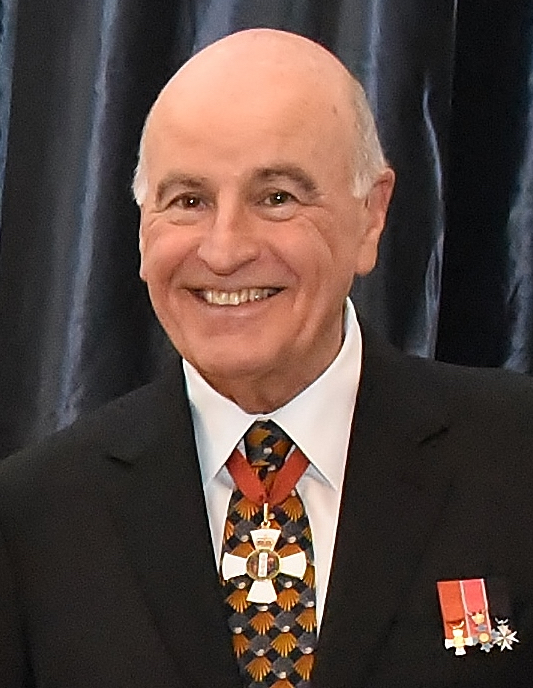
David Gascoigne

=== Companion (CNZM) ===
- Professor Atholl John Anderson – of Picton. For services to anthropology and archaeology.
- Michael Shane Campbell ONZM – of Porirua City. For services to golf.
- The Most Reverend Peter James Cullinane – of Palmerston North. For services to the community.
- Thomas George Goddard – of Wellington. For services to the Employment Court.
- Dr Ruth Elizabeth Harley OBE – of Wellington. For services to the New Zealand film industry.
- Mabel June Hinekahukura Mariu QSM JP – of Waitakere (West Auckland). For services to Māori and the community.
- Jonathan Irving Mayson – of Mount Maunganui. For services to the shipping industry and to export.
- Jennifer Ann Morel – of Wellington. For services to business.
- Bruce Craig Munro – of North Shore City. For services to the wool industry and science innovation.
- Professor Edward David Penny – of Palmerston North. For services to science.
- Robert James Robinson – of Wellington, lately Commissioner of Police. For services to the New Zealand Police.
- Melwyn Purefoy Smith – of Raumati Beach. For public services, lately as an ombudsman.
- Associate Professor Clifford Tasman-Jones – of Auckland. For services to public health.
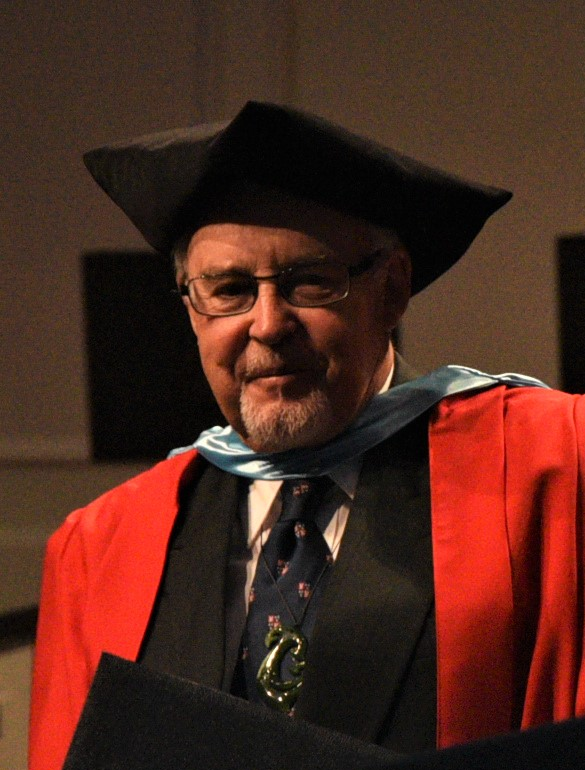
Atholl Anderson

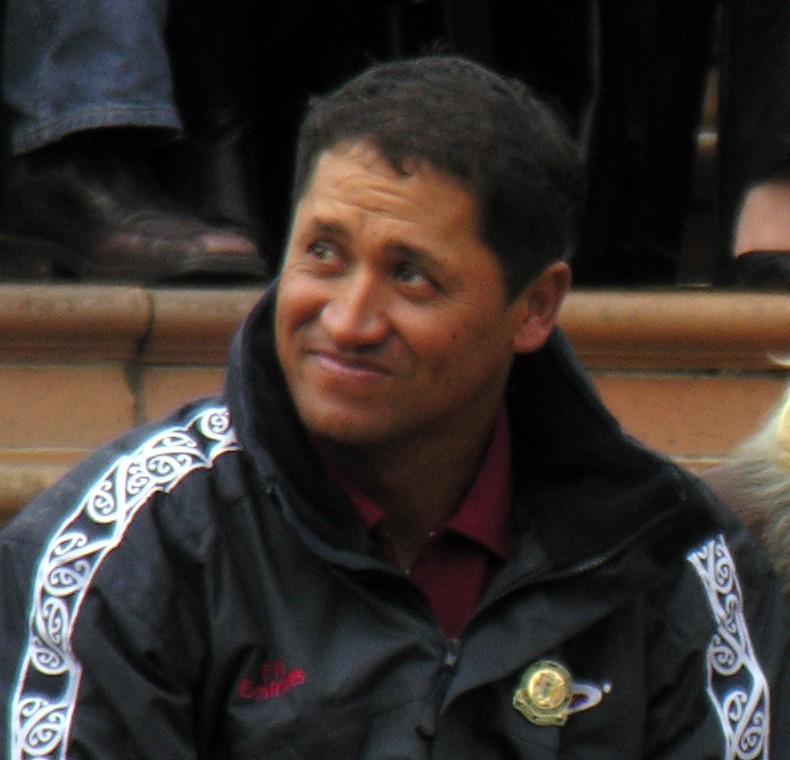
Michael Campbell

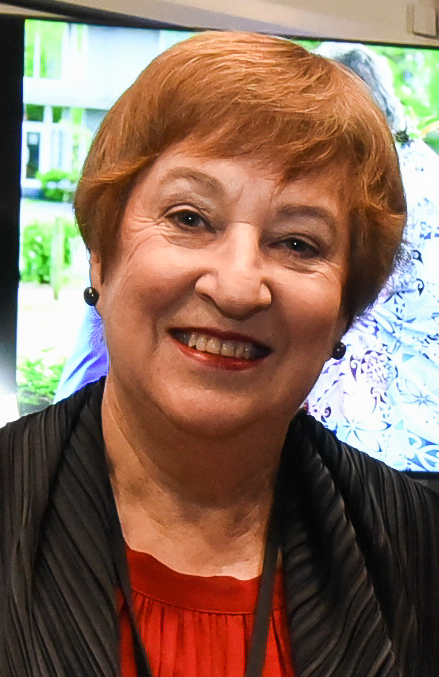
Ruth Harley

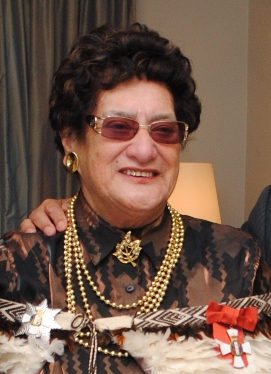
June Mariu

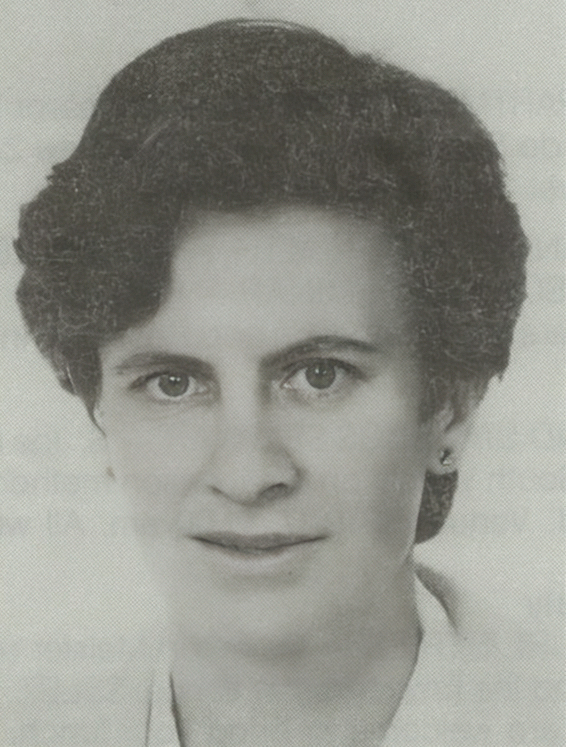
Jenny Morel

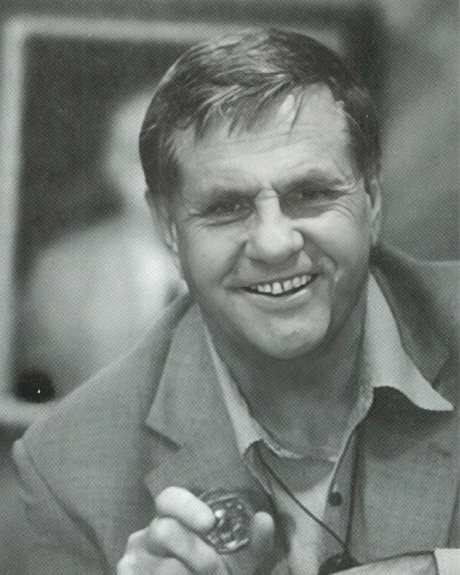
David Penny

=== Officer (ONZM) ===
- Dr Christopher John Baker – of Feilding. For services to agriculture.
- Dr Robert Beaglehole – of Vesancy, France. For services to medicine.
- Dr Ruth Bonita Beaglehole – of Vesancy, France. For services to medicine.
- Emeritus Professor Arthur Neil Bruḕre – of Palmerston North. For services to veterinary science.
- Bruce George Cameron – of North Shore City. For services to sport.
- Dr Roger David John Collins – of Dunedin. For services to art history.
- Dr Carrick Erskine Devine – of Hamilton. For services to meat science.
- Emeritus Professor Robin Fraser – of Christchurch. For services to medical research.
- Clive Andre Jermy – of Otago. For services to the deer industry.
- Stacey William Jones – of Auckland. For services to rugby league.
- Dr Anne Kolbe – of Auckland. For services to medicine.
- Dr Matthew Balmano Marshall – of Whangārei. For services to sports medicine.
- Alan Douglas Martin – of Wellington. For services to business.
- Dr Pamela Susan Melding – of North Shore City. For services to the psychiatry profession.
- Professor Anthony Christopher Bernard Molteno – of Dunedin. For services to ophthalmology and people with glaucoma.
- James Harray Richards DSC – of North Shore City. For services to publishing.
- Elspeth Somerville Sandys – of Stratford-upon-Avon, United Kingdom. For services to literature.
- Thomas Joseph Scott – of Wellington. For services as a writer, journalist and illustrator.
- The Reverend Harry Ivan Shaw – of Hamilton. For services to the Boys' Brigade of New Zealand and the community.
- Ellen Adrienne, Lady Stewart QSM – of Christchurch. For services to the community.
- Professor Joyce Mary Waters (Lady Waters) – of Auckland. For services to chemistry.

Additional

- Lieutenant Colonel Philip John Morrison – The Corps of Royal New Zealand Engineers.
- Major Charmaine Puteruha Pene – Royal New Zealand Army Medical Corps. For Asian tsunami relief operations.
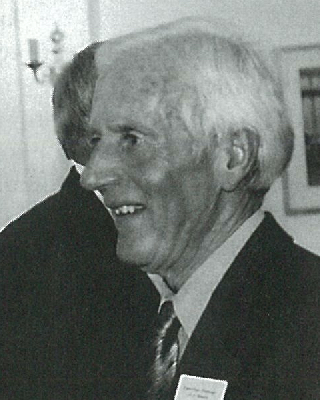
Neil Bruere

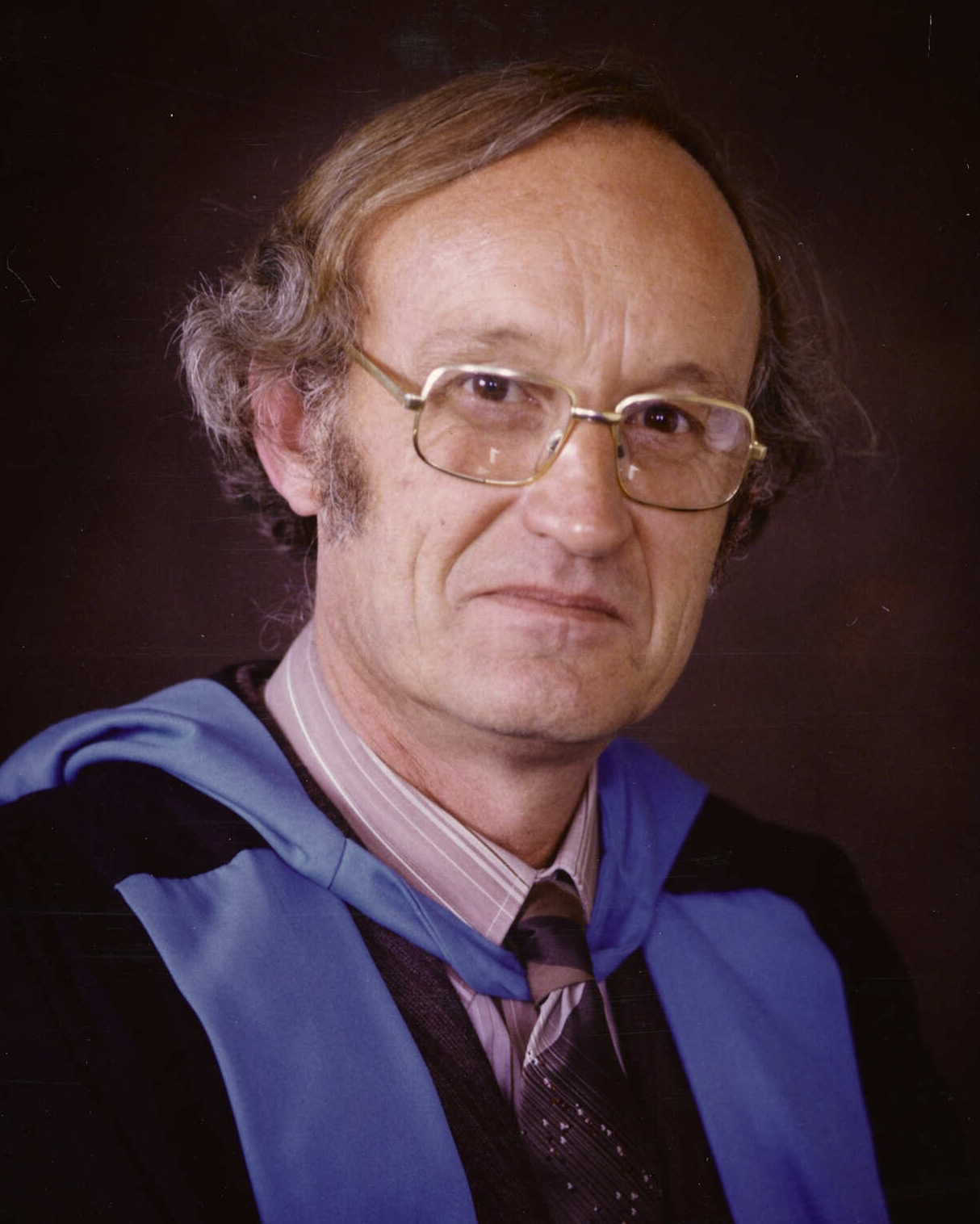
Robin Fraser

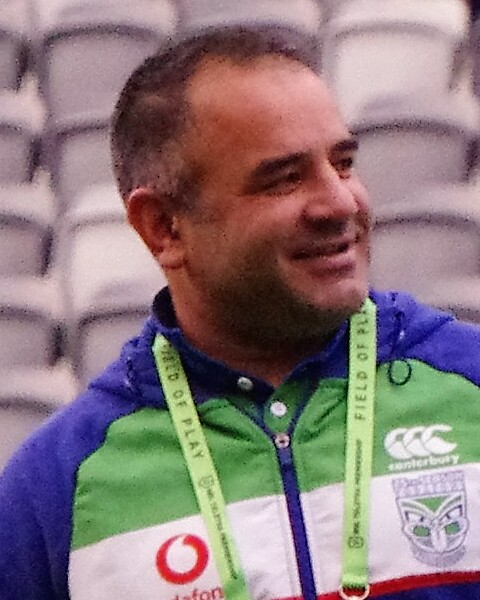
Stacey Jones

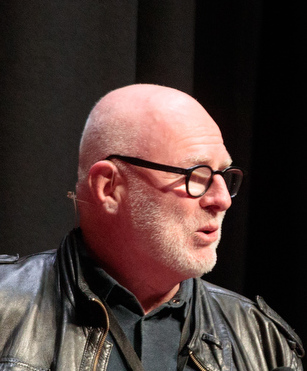
Tom Scott

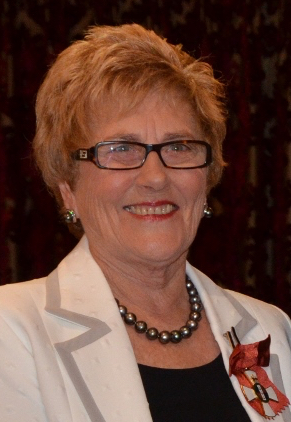
Adrienne Stewart

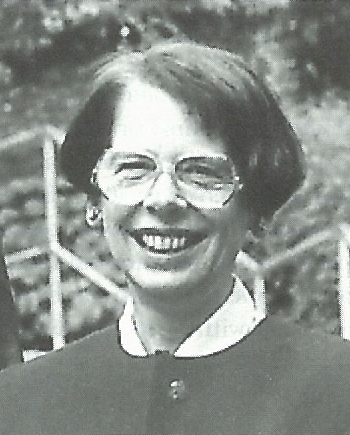
Joyce Waters

=== Member (MNZM) ===
- Neil Carmichael Anderson – of Fairlie. For services to local-body affairs and the community.
- Emeritus Professor Josu Arrillaga – of Christchurch. For services to electrical engineering.
- Mohammed Daud Azimullah – of Auckland. For services to the Muslim community.
- Walter Francis Bayliss – of Te Puke. For services to the kiwifruit industry.
- Grant Richard Beck – of North Shore City. For services to yachting and board sailing.
- Judith Lesley Berryman – of Wellington. For services to choral music.
- Barbara Whirimako Black – of North Shore City. For services to Māori music.
- Ian Bell Blair – of Otago. For services to ploughing.
- Kenneth John Bowen – of Palmerston North. For services to the environment.
- Gael Patricia Brooks – of Auckland. For services to child safety.
- Patrick Gerard Brosnan JP – of Lower Hutt. For services to local-body and community affairs.
- Raymond Wilton Burrell – of Wellington. For services to mountain safety.
- Roger George Carson – of North Shore City, superintendent of New Zealand Police. For services to the New Zealand Police.
- Gordon Dennis Chesterman – of Hamilton. For services to the community.
- Dr Grant Watson Christie – of Auckland. For services to astronomy.
- Beverley Janice Cooper – of Papakura. For services to roller skating.
- Matthew James Andrew Cooper – of Hamilton. For services to rugby and sports administration.
- Audrey Frances Cox – of Wanganui. For services to the community.
- Emily Cecilia Drumm – of Auckland. For services to women's cricket.
- Dr Roderick Boyd Ellis-Pegler – of Auckland. For services to medicine.
- Helen Elizabeth Eskett – of Christchurch. For services to family planning.
- Joan Elizabeth Fear – of Hamilton. For services to the arts.
- Leslie Arthur Gilmore – of the West Coast. For services to the community.
- Jennifer Ann Hair – of Blenheim. For services to hockey.
- Judith Rangimarie Hawkin – of Hastings. For services to horticulture and the community.
- Patricia Rongomaitara (Ramai) Hayward – of Auckland. For services to film and television.
- Carole Hicks – of Porirua City. For services to archery.
- John David Jordan – of Inglewood. For services to search and rescue.
- Meri Eileen Leask – of Bluff. For services to the fishing industry.
- Barbara Louisa Isabel Lim – of Te Awamutu. For services to the Chinese community.
- Keith Douglas (Midge) Marsden – of Auckland. For services to music.
- Peter Alexander McNeill – of Te Horo. For services to civil aviation.
- Andrew Philip Mehrtens – of Richmond, United Kingdom (lately of Christchurch). For services to rugby.
- Annabel Claire Norman – of Nelson. For services to the arts and tourism.
- Rangitane Will (Tane) Norton – of Christchurch. For services to rugby.
- Briolette Kah Bic Runga – of Auckland. For services to music.
- Eric John Tupai Ruru – of Gisborne. For services to forestry.
- Marilyn Claire Sainty – of Auckland. For services to the fashion industry.
- Raylene Pamela Sommervile – of Tokoroa. For services to international student exchange and the community.
- Matthew John Te Pou MBE BEM – of Whakatāne. For services to rugby.
- Graeme William Thomson – of Eastbourne. For services to broadcasting.
- Rodney James Titcombe JP – of Feilding. For services to local-body affairs.
- Paul John Van Den Munckhof – of Auckland. For services to sport.
- Robert Geoffrey Veale – of Wellington, inspector of New Zealand Police. For services to the New Zealand Police.
- Peter Northe Wells – of Auckland. For services to literature and film.
- Colin Willis – of Christchurch. For services to sport.
- Lieutenant Commander John William Butcher – Royal New Zealand Navy.
- Lieutenant Colonel Terry John Kinloch – Royal New Zealand Armoured Corps.
- Lieutenant Colonel Robert William Bradford Mackie – Royal New Zealand Infantry Regiment.
- Wing Commander Andrew Jack Woods – Royal New Zealand Air Force.

Additional

- Lieutenant Colonel Gregory Carl Allnutt – Royal New Zealand Infantry Regiment.
- Major David Michael Boyd – Royal New Zealand Infantry Regiment.
- Michael Dennis Bush – of Bangkok, Thailand, detective inspector, New Zealand Police. For Asian tsunami relief operations.
- Major Roger Earp – Royal New Zealand Infantry Regiment (Territorial Force).
- Captain Andrew James Fortune – Royal Regiment of New Zealand Artillery.
- Warrant Officer Mark MacDonald Harwood BEM – Royal New Zealand Air Force, Waitakere City. For Asian tsunami relief operations.
- Major Jeremy David Holmes – New Zealand Intelligence Corps.
- Corporal Gabrielle Anne Knight – Royal New Zealand Air Force, Waitakere City. For Asian tsunami relief operations.
- Private Kueni (Sole) Matautia – Royal New Zealand Infantry Regiment.
- Captain Georgina Rangiauraki Angela Parata-Turvey – Royal New Zealand Nursing Corps, Palmerston North. For Asian tsunami relief operations.
- Major Mark William Taylor – Royal New Zealand Corps of Signals.
- Major Richard John Weston – Royal New Zealand Army Logistic Regiment, Palmerston North. For Asian tsunami relief operations.
- Michael James Wright – of Napier, senior sergeant, New Zealand Police. For Asian tsunami relief operations.

Honorary

- Sonia Sooknyu Hong – of Seoul, Republic of Korea. For services to tourism.
- Seiichi Kinoshita – of Kakogawa-shi, Japan. For services to New Zealand–Japan relations.
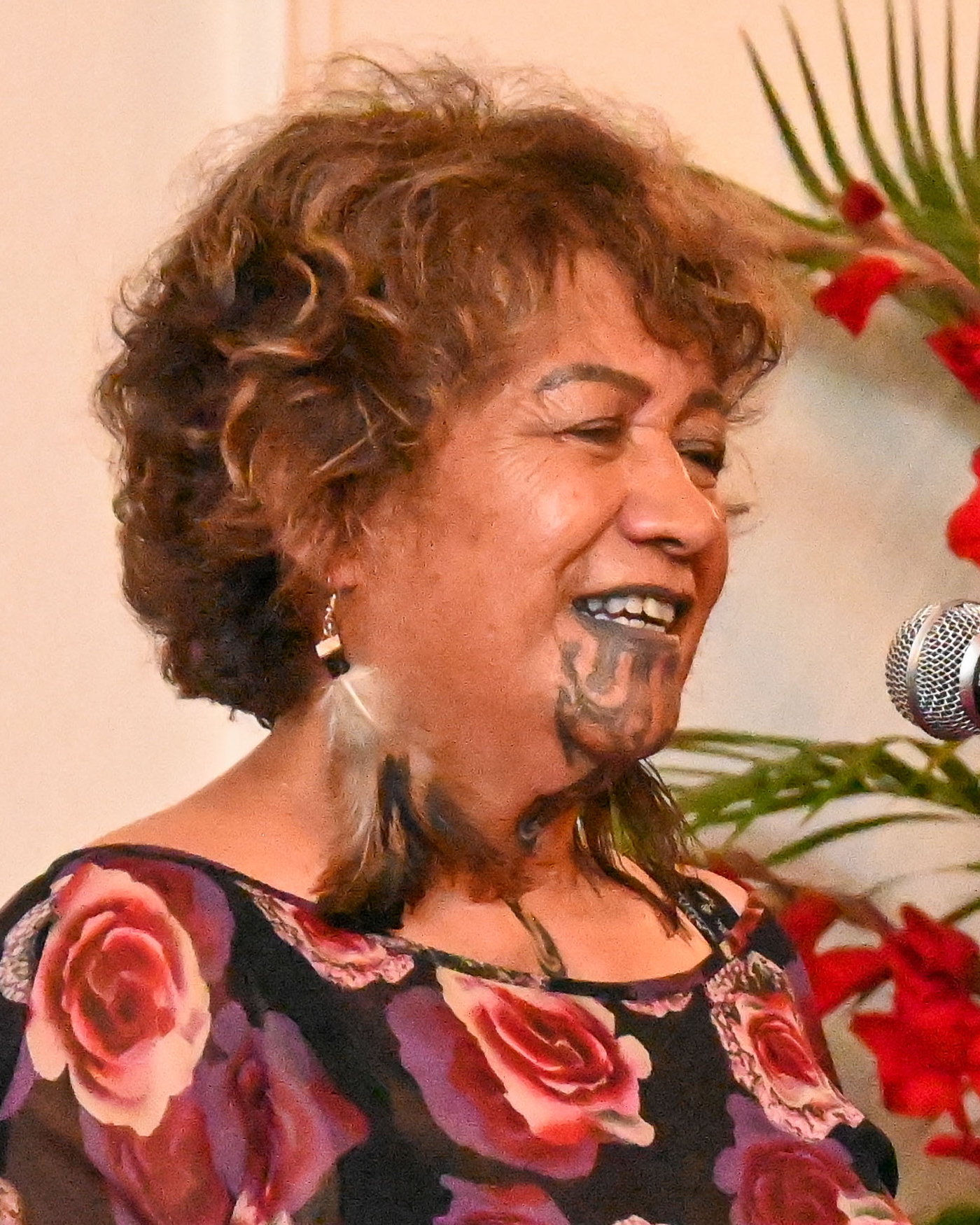
Whirimako Black

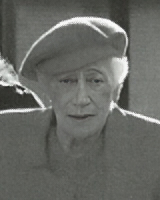
Ramai Hayward

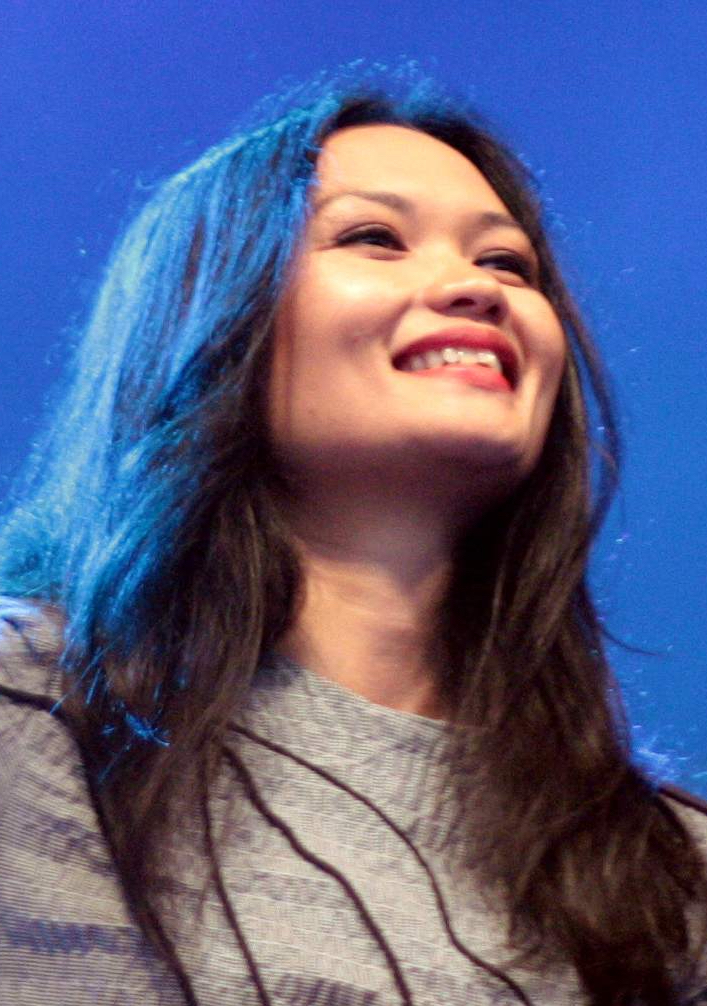
Bic Runga

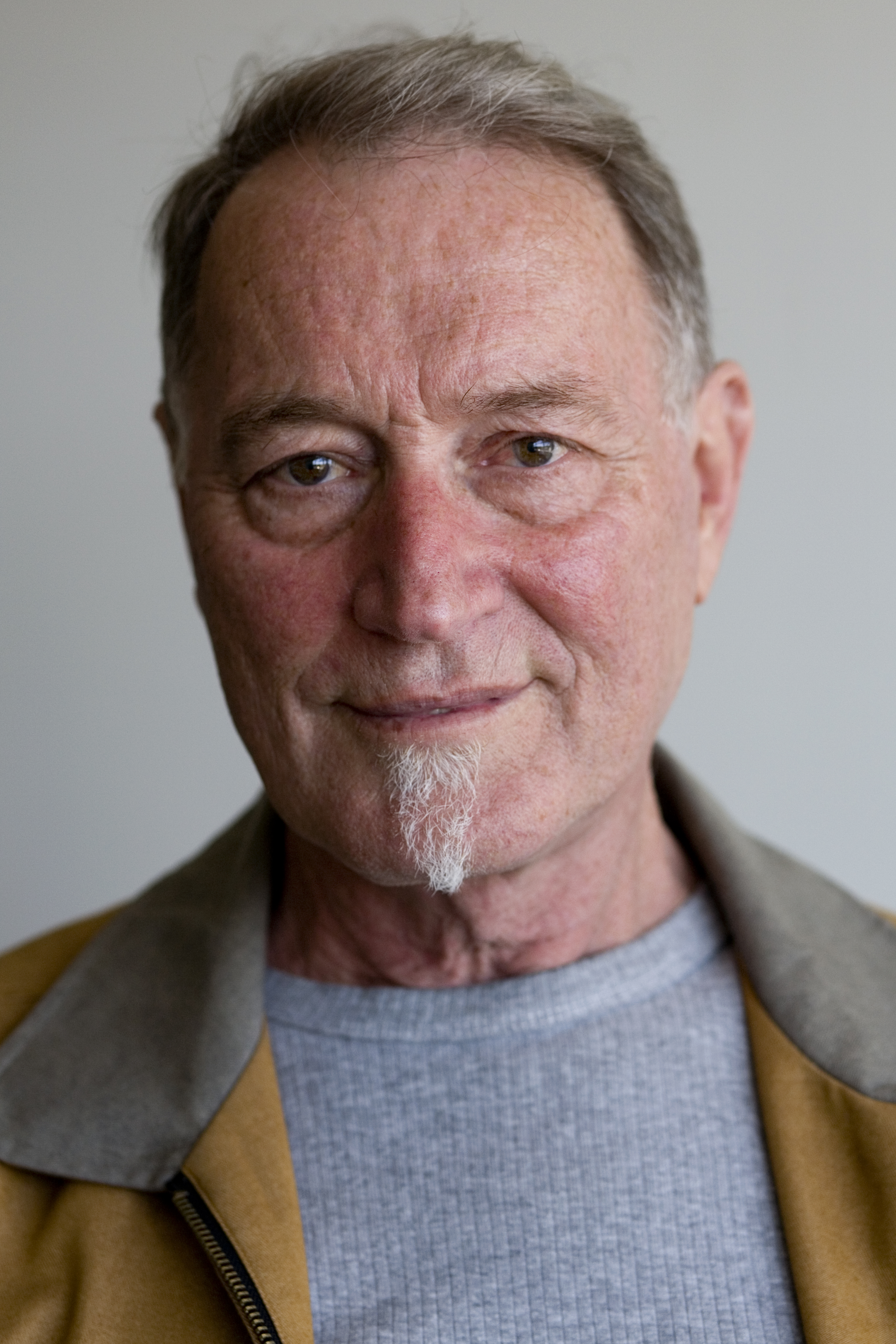
Peter Wells

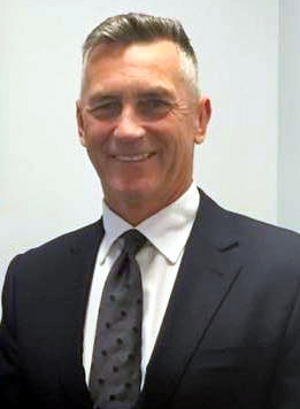
Mike Bush

== Companion of the Queen's Service Order (QSO) ==
=== For community service ===
- Harish Kumar Bajaj JP – of Auckland.
- Rosemary Ann Carruthers – of Timaru.
- Dr Joan Chappell-Mathias – of Tauranga.
- Diana Ramsay Fenwick – of Auckland.
- Dr John Maxwell Raeburn – of North Shore City.

=== For public services ===
- John Duncan Andrew Hercus – of Christchurch.
- Dr Lance Cordner Jennings – of Christchurch.
- Dail Michael John Jones – of North Shore City.
- Peter William Ernest Nicholl – of Sarajevo, Bosnia and Herzegovina.
- Colonel Andrew Peter Renton-Green – of Wellington.
- Stuart Rothwell Strachan – of Dunedin.
- Ian Tulloch JP – of Southland.
- Catherine Ceinwen Wallace – of Wellington.
- Ian Andrew Wilson – of Palmerston North.

== Queen's Service Medal (QSM) ==
=== For community service ===
- Ashley Kingsford Booth – of Hamilton.
- Charles Stanley Butcher – of Lower Hutt.
- Rewa Yolande Crawley – of Blenheim.
- Alwynne Irene Crowsen – of Waitakere City.
- Eric Gilbert – of Waihi.
- Leslie John Hall – of Wellington.
- Sabina Hardiman (Sister Mary Chanel) – of Dunedin.
- Lindsay Rangi Makawe Henare – of Wellington.
- Anthony James Hughes – of Waitakere City.
- Vivian Hutchinson – of New Plymouth.
- Ian William Jones – of Canterbury.
- Patricia Joan Leckie – of Levin.
- Douglas John Lovell – of Dunedin.
- Katherine Faith (Willow) Macky – of Auckland.
- Dean Joe Marsters JP – of Manukau City.
- Francis Joseph Martin – of Wairoa.
- Therese Monica Maxwell JP – of Waitakere City.
- Violet Jessie McCowatt – of Papakura.
- Elizabeth Clayton Morgan JP – of Whangārei.
- Roy Lloyd Munn – of Greymouth.
- Barry John O'Neill JP – of South Canterbury.
- William Gerald Overton – of Dunedin.
- Tai Woon (Lynda) Park – of Auckland.
- Josephine Parsons – of Christchurch.
- The Reverend Makere Rangitere Paul-Hoetawa – of Napier.
- James Craig Peterson – of Dunedin.
- Robert John Pollock – of Cambridge.
- Wallace Craig Pollock – of Cambridge.
- Michael Bernard Pope – of Ashburton.
- Gerald Ernest Robert Rangi – of Motueka.
- Maxine Waiti Rennie – of Rotorua.
- Josephine Thora Roberts JP – of Auckland.
- Marion Eleanor Smith – of Paeroa.
- Sylvia Stewart – of Hamilton.
- Susau Etika Jane Strickland – of Auckland.
- Bernice Irene Tainui JP – of Christchurch.
- Joseph Hilton Taylor – of Masterton.
- Rakauoteora Donald Te Maipi – of Raumati South.
- Jane Ngarupa Topi-Burke – of Christchurch.
- Dorothy Ann Tortell – of Paekākāriki.
- Robin Dale Waghorn – of Akaroa.
- The Reverend Kura Kakerangi Walker – of Gisborne.
- Howard Walter Williams – of Westport.

Honorary

- Eelco Boswijk – of Nelson.
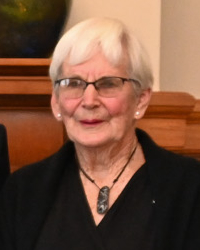
Joan Leckie

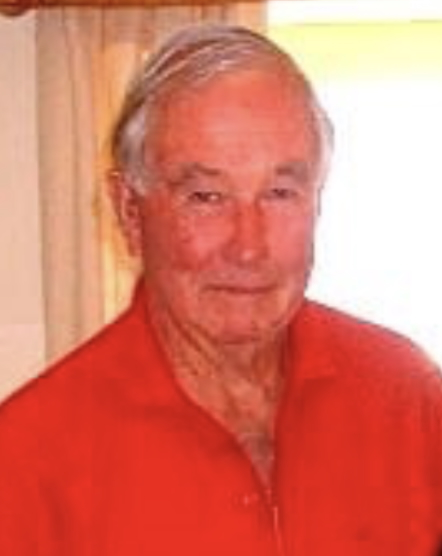
Joe Taylor

=== For public services ===
- Epafala Auimatagi JP – of Waitakere City.
- Allen Bruford – of Washington, D.C., United States of America.
- Gordon Prothero Talbot Cooksley – of Raumati.
- Erle Fraser Dale – of Invercargill.
- Roy William Dench – of Ōhaupō.
- Jacqueline Ellen Dromgool – of Wellington.
- Gilbert Alexander Glausiuss – of Christchurch.
- Paul Montague Green – of Tūrangi.
- Richmond James Harding – of Wanganui.
- David Clark Harre – of Waitakere City.
- Murray James Haxton – of Te Puke.
- Huia Mere Arihi Henere JP – of Wanganui.
- Terence Houghton – of Kaitaia, chief fire officer, Kaitaia Volunteer Fire Brigade, New Zealand Fire Service.
- Brian Leslie Hunter – of Matamata, chief fire officer, Matamata Volunteer Fire Brigade, New Zealand Fire Service.
- David John Hyde – of Greymouth, Volunteer Support Officer, New Zealand Fire Service.
- Alan Lester Jermaine ED – of North Shore City.
- David Rhydderch Jones – of Ruakākā.
- Song Lam – of Auckland.
- Mary Lean – of Rotorua.
- Norman Malcolm McKelvey – of Waitakere City.
- Richard Noel McMillan JP – of Huntly.
- John Douglas Murdoch – of Christchurch.
- Eileen O'Callaghan – of Wainuiomata.
- Norma Te Aohau Ordish – of New Plymouth.
- Allen Ernest Pidwel – of New Plymouth, lately chief fire officer, New Plymouth Fire District, New Zealand Fire Service.
- Dr Shane Raymond Reti – of Whangārei.
- Anne-Marie Reynolds – of Christchurch.
- Aorere (Awi) Riddell JP – of Auckland.
- Margaret Gwendoline Robins – of Levin.
- William Don Ross – of Christchurch.
- Graham George Sampson – of North Shore City.
- Owen Francis Spotswood – of Waipukurau, Deputy chief fire officer, Waipukurau Volunteer Fire Brigade, New Zealand Fire Service.
- Leo James Steel – of Christchurch.
- Squadron Leader Sandra Lee Stonell – of Rotorua.
- Donald Ford Waugh – of Balclutha.
- Peter Francis Williams – of Napier.
- Colin Thomas McCord Winter JP – of Invercargill.
- Brian Elvin Wright – of Tauranga.

Additional, for Asian tsunami relief operations

- Douglas Fua Alo – of Bangkok, Thailand, New Zealand Customs Service.
- Peter Gregory Summerfield – of Christchurch, sergeant of the New Zealand Police.

Honorary

- Robert Lateef Khan – of Palmerston North.
