= Casual employment (contract) =

Employment that is not ongoing or fulltime

Casual employment or contract employment is an employment classification under employment law.

== Australia ==
In Australian workplace law, there has been a statutory definition of casual employment since 2021 (which is retrospective). Under the Fair Work Act 2009, a person is a casual employee if:

- they are offered a job
- the offer does not include a "firm advance commitment" that the work will continue indefinitely with an agreed pattern of work
- they accept the offer knowing there is no firm advance commitment and become an employee.

The only four factors that can be considered in whether an employer's offer does not include a "firm advance commitment" are:

- whether the employer can choose to offer the employee work and whether the employee has the choice to work or not
- whether the employee will be offered work when the business needs them to work
- if the employment is described as casual
- if the employee is paid a casual loading (a higher pay rate for being a casual employee), or a specific pay rate for casual employees.

Under the National Employment Standards, certain casual employees (who have worked for at least 12 months and worked a regular pattern of hours for the last six months) have a right to be offered or request their employer to convert to permanent employment. There are some exceptions, for example for small businesses.

Approximately 28% of all Australian workers were employed on a casual basis in 2003. Employers often contact casual employees regularly from week to week to supplement their normal workforce as needed.

== New Zealand ==
In New Zealand, casual employees are guaranteed either annual leave pro-rata, or 8% holiday pay on top of earnings. Casual employment contracts lack sick leave and guaranteed work hours.

In Jinkinson v Oceana Gold (NZ) Ltd, the Employment Court of New Zealand ruled that:

The distinction between casual employment and ongoing employment lies in the extent to which the parties have mutual employment related obligations between periods of work. If those obligations only exist during periods of work, the employment will be regarded as casual. If there are mutual obligations which continue between periods of work, there will be an ongoing employment relationship"

Under Lee v Minor Developments Ltd t/a Before Six Childcare Centre (2008), the Employment Court outlined the following characteristics as those the courts use to assess whether employment is casual:

- Engagement for short periods of time for specific purposes;
- A lack of regular work pattern or expectation of ongoing employment;
- Employment is dependent on the availability of work demands;
- No guarantee of work from one week to the next;
- Employment as and when needed;
- The lack of an obligation on the employer to offer employment, or on the employee to accept any other engagement; and
- Employees are only engaged for the specific term of each period of employment.

In 2008, the Fourth Labour Government proposed the strengthening of casual employment rights. However, they were voted out of office later during the year.

== United Kingdom ==
The UK Government defines casual employment as the following:

- Employees occasionally do work for a specific business
- The business does not have to offer employees work and employees do not have to accept it – employees only work when they want to
- The contract with the business uses terms like 'casual', 'freelance', 'zero hours', 'as required' or something similar
- Employees had to agree with the business's terms and conditions to get work – either verbally or in writing
- Employees are under the supervision or control of a manager or director
- Employees cannot send someone else to do their work
- The business deducts tax and National Insurance contributions from their wages
- The business provides materials, tools or equipment they need to do the work

== See also ==
- Contingent work
- Employment
- Informal sector
- Zero-hour contract
