= John Sainty =

John Sainty may refer to:

- John Sainty (parliamentary official) (1934–2025), British clerk in the House of Lords
- John Sainty (footballer) (1946–2023), English footballer

== See also ==
- Sainty, a surname
