= Robert Beaglehole =

New Zealand public health physician and epidemiologist (born 1945)

- Born: 1945 (age 80–81); Wellington, New Zealand
- Education: University of Otago (M.B., B.Chir); London School of Hygiene and Tropical Medicine (MSc); University of North Carolina at Chapel Hill (PhD/M.P.H.)
- Occupations: Public health physician; Epidemiologist; Academic
- Employer(s): University of Auckland; World Health Organization
- Notable work: Basic Epidemiology; Public Health at the Crossroads; Global Public Health: A New Era
- Title: Professor Emeritus of Community Health; University of Auckland
- Spouse: Ruth Bonita (m. 1967)
- Children: Anna Lucy Beaglehole; Robert Harvey Beaglehole
- Relatives: Ernest Beaglehole (father); Jane Ritchie, Ruth Beaglehole, and David Beaglehole (siblings)

Robert Beaglehole (born 1945) is a New Zealand public health physician, epidemiologist, and former director at the World Health Organization (WHO). His work has focused on cardiovascular disease (CVD) epidemiology, the prevention and control of noncommunicable diseases (NCDs), and global public health policy. He is Professor Emeritus at the University of Auckland and has authored scientific papers and books on epidemiology and public health.

== Early life and education ==
Beaglehole was born in New Zealand in 1945. He initially trained in medicine at the University of Otago and later pursued postgraduate education in cardiology at Guy’s Hospital in London. He subsequently earned advanced degrees in epidemiology and public health at the London School of Hygiene and Tropical Medicine and the University of North Carolina at Chapel Hill.

== Career ==
From 1988 to 1999, Beaglehole was Professor of Community Health at the University of Auckland. His academic work focused on chronic disease prevention, CVD risk factors, and population-based public health strategies. His work included the development of stroke registries in New Zealand as part of the WHO MONICA project.

Beaglehole joined the World Health Organization in 2000 and held a series of leadership roles. In 2003, he was invited by then Director-General Dr. Lee Jong-wook to join the transition team. He later became Director of the Department of Chronic Diseases and Health Promotion (2004–2007). During this period, he edited the 2003 and 2004 World Health Reports, directed the first Lancet series on chronic diseases, and advocated for the Bangkok Charter for Health Promotion.

He supported various global strategies such as the 25 by 25 goal, which aimed to reduce premature NCD mortality by 25% by the year 2025.

After returning to New Zealand in 2007, Beaglehole continued his work on NCD prevention, particularly in the western Pacific region. He has criticized existing global tobacco-control policies and has argued that harm reduction measures should form part of tobacco control policy. In 2022, he and Ruth Bonita called for a reassessment of the WHO Framework Convention on Tobacco Control. They argued for including lower-risk nicotine products such as e-cigarettes and nicotine pouches. He has also advocated for reducing dietary sodium, he has criticized the widespread availability of junk food, and he has written and spoken about the negative effects of poverty on diet and health.

== Publications and recognition ==
Beaglehole has published over 200 scientific articles and several books, including:

- Basic Epidemiology (World Health Organization, 2006)
- Public Health at the Crossroads (Cambridge University Press, 2004)
- Global Public Health: A New Era (Oxford University Press, 2009)

He is the founding chair of Action on Smoking and Health (ASH) in New Zealand, which supports the Smokefree Aotearoa 2025 goal, and co-directs International Public Health Consultants. He chairs the Lancet NCD Action Group.

== Personal life ==
Robert Beaglehole met Australian teacher and fellow public health professional Ruth Bonita in 1966, and they married in 1967. Beaglehole is the son of anthropologist Ernest Beaglehole, the brother of psychologist Jane Ritchie, the brother of physicist David Beaglehole, and the brother of community activist and teacher Ruth Beaglehole.
