= Thomas Goddard (jurist) =

New Zealand jurist (1937–2019)

Thomas Goddard CNZM

1st Chief Employment Court Judge
- In office September 1989 – 19 May 2005
- Succeeded by: Graeme Colgan

Personal details
- Born: Tomasz Goldwag; 20 May 1937 Warsaw, Poland
- Died: 14 March 2019 (aged 81) Wellington, New Zealand
- Citizenship: New Zealander
- Education: Victoria University College
- Profession: Barrister and solicitor

Thomas George Goddard CNZM (born Tomasz Goldwag, 20 May 1937 – 14 March 2019) was a New Zealand jurist. He served as chief judge of the Employment Court of New Zealand from 1989 to 2005.

== Early life and family ==
Goddard was born Tomasz Goldwag in Warsaw, Poland, on 20 May 1937, the son of Naum Goldwag and Estera Goldwag (née Kryńska). They survived The Holocaust and came to New Zealand in 1947, changing their surname to Goddard. Thomas Goddard became a naturalised New Zealand citizen in 1952. He was educated at Wellington College, and went on to study at Victoria University College, graduating with a Bachelor of Arts majoring in French and Latin in 1958, a Master of Arts in French the following year, and a Bachelor of Laws in 1962.

== Career ==
Goddard was called to the bar as a barrister and solicitor of the Supreme Court in 1962, and specialised in employment law, equity law, administrative law, the law of torts, contract law, and jurisprudence. He practised either in partnership or in sole practice until 1989, and in 1982 acted as counsel for the successful plaintiff in a cited case regarding exemplary damages in tort, Taylor v Beere. In 1989, he was appointed chief judge of the Labour Court, and when that court became the Employment Court in 1991, he continued as chief judge, retiring from that role in 2005.

== Later life and death ==
Not long after his retirement, Goddard was appointed by the Tongan government in August 2005 to review the pay claims of Tongan public servants who were on strike. When the District Court judge Ian Borrin died in 2016, he left a $30 million legacy for the establishment of a charitable trust, the Michael and Suzanne Borrin Foundation, in memory of his parents, and Goddard was appointed as a member of its grants and scholarship committee.

Goddard died at his home in Wellington on 14 March 2019.

== Honours ==
In 1990, Goddard was awarded the New Zealand 1990 Commemoration Medal. He was appointed a Companion of the New Zealand Order of Merit, for services to the Employment Court, in the 2006 New Year Honours.
