= Sister Loyola Galvin =

New Zealand religious sister (1922–2021)

Sister Loyola Galvin MNZM QSM
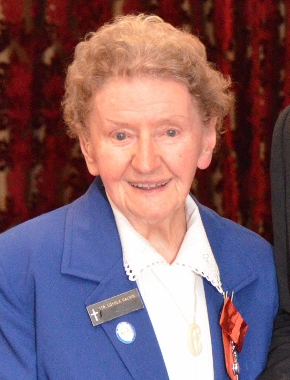
- Born: Johanna Mary Frances Galvin; 12 May 1922; Hāwera, New Zealand
- Died: 22 May 2021 (aged 99); Upper Hutt, New Zealand
- Occupation: Religious sister

Johanna Mary Frances Galvin MNZM QSM (12 May 1922 – 22 May 2021), better known as Sister Loyola Galvin, was a New Zealand religious sister.

Galvin was born in Hāwera in 1922, and became a nun who served the Wellington community. She became known after the release of the award-winning documentary, Gardening with Soul. In the 1996 New Year Honours, she was awarded the Queen's Service Medal for community service, and she was appointed a Member of the New Zealand Order of Merit, for services to gardening, in the 2014 New Year Honours.

Galvin died at the St Joseph's Home of Compassion in Upper Hutt on 22 May 2021, aged 99.
