= Ruth Harley =

New Zealand theatre, film and television executive and administrator

Ruth Harley CNZM OBE
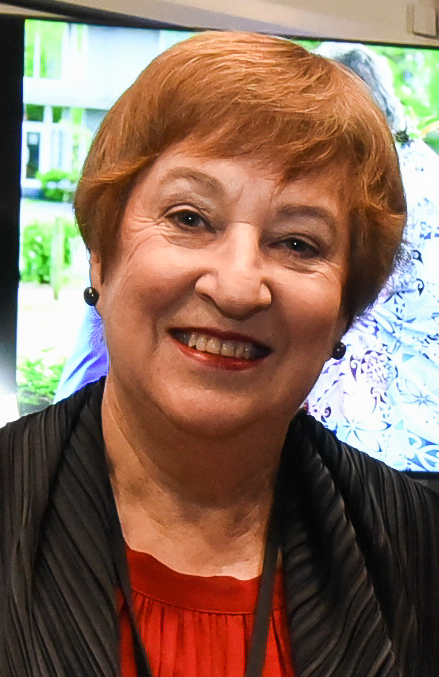
- Harley in 2019
- Born: Nelson, New Zealand
- Education: University of Canterbury (BA); University of Auckland (PhD)
- Occupations: Theatre, film and television executive
- Employer(s): QEII Arts Council TVNZ; NZ Film Commission; Screen Australia NZ On Air Irirangi Te Motu

Ruth Elizabeth Harley CNZM OBE is a New Zealand theatre, film and television executive.

== Early life and education ==
Harley was born in Nelson, New Zealand, and completed her secondary education at Nelson College for Girls. She graduated from the University of Canterbury with a BA and then moved to the University of Auckland for her PhD.

== Career ==
Harley worked for the QEII Arts Council, where she was responsible for theatre funding and worked in a liaison role.

She moved to TVNZ in 1986 as commissioning editor of projects including the film, An Angel at My Table, and television series, such as Public Eye and That’s Fairly Interesting.

Harley was appointed chief executive officer of the New Zealand Film Commission in 1997. Films funded during her tenure included Whale Rider, starring Academy Award nominated, Keisha Castle-Hughes and The World's Fastest Indian, starring Anthony Hopkins.

From 2008 to 2013 Harley served as the inaugural chief executive officer of Screen Australia. In this role she oversaw the amalgamation of three film agencies to become Screen Australia. Projects funded under her leadership included films such as The Sapphires and the television series Redfern Now.

Harley was appointed chair of NZ On Air Irirangi Te Motu in 2018 and reappointed for a further three years in 2021.

== Awards and recognition ==
Harley was awarded the New Zealand Suffrage Centennial Medal in 1993.

She was appointed an Officer of the Order of the British Empire in the 1996 New Year Honours for her work in broadcasting and in the 2006 New Year Honours, she was made a Companion of the New Zealand Order of Merit in recognition for her service to the film industry in New Zealand.
