= Eunice Eichler =

New Zealand Salvation Army officer, nurse and midwife

Eunice Eichler CBE
- Born: Eunice Mary Eichler; 6 January 1932; Milton, New Zealand
- Died: 12 March 2017 (aged 85)
- Occupations: Salvation Army officer; nurse; midwife
- Known for: Advocating for open adoption in New Zealand

Eunice Mary Eichler CBE (6 January 1932 – 12 March 2017) was a New Zealand Salvation Army officer, nurse and midwife. She established New Zealand's first school for pregnant teenagers in 1973, and was an advocate for open adoption.

== Early life, family and education ==
Eichler was born in Milton on 6 January 1932. Both of her parents, Paul Allen Eichler and Alice Eichler (née Hart), were Salvation Army officers. She was educated at Thames High School and Otahuhu College. She went on to study nursing at New Plymouth Hospital, becoming a registered nurse in 1954, and continued her training at the Avon Maternity Hospital in Stratford, qualifying as a registered maternity nurse in 1955. She became a midwife in 1959 after training at St Helen's Hospital, Christchurch, and undertook further study at the Postgraduate School of Nursing in Wellington, where she was awarded a Diploma of Nursing in 1962. She attended Salvation Army Officer Training College in 1956, becoming a Salvation Army officer the following year.

== Career ==
Eichler spent her career working at maternity hospitals around New Zealand. She was the assistant matron at Bethany Hospital in Auckland from 1957 to 1959, and at Edward Murphy Hospital in Gisborne from 1960 to 1962. Between 1963 and 1970, she was matron at Redroofs Hospital in Dunedin. Eichler represented New Zealand at the International Conference on Social Welfare at Helsinki in 1968.

In 1970, Eichler moved back to the Bethany Centre in Auckland as matron-manager, where she remained until her retirement in 1992. In 1973, Eichler established New Zealand's first school for pregnant teenagers at the Bethany Centre. She advocated for reform of adoption practice, and was a pioneer of open adoption in New Zealand. From 1973, women giving birth at Bethany opting to put their child up for adoption were encouraged to choose open adoption. Eichler believed that this approach, which allows birth and prospective adoptive parents to meet, reassured birth parents that their baby was being given to a loving and supportive family.

== Death ==
Eichler died on 12 March 2017.

== Honours and awards ==
In 1978, Eichler received a notable vocation service award from the Auckland Rotary Club, and in 1990 she was awarded the New Zealand 1990 Commemoration Medal. In the 1996 New Year Honours, she was appointed a Commander of the Order of the British Empire, for services to welfare work.
