= Margaret Loutit =

New Zealand microbiologist (1929–2020)

Margaret Loutit CBE
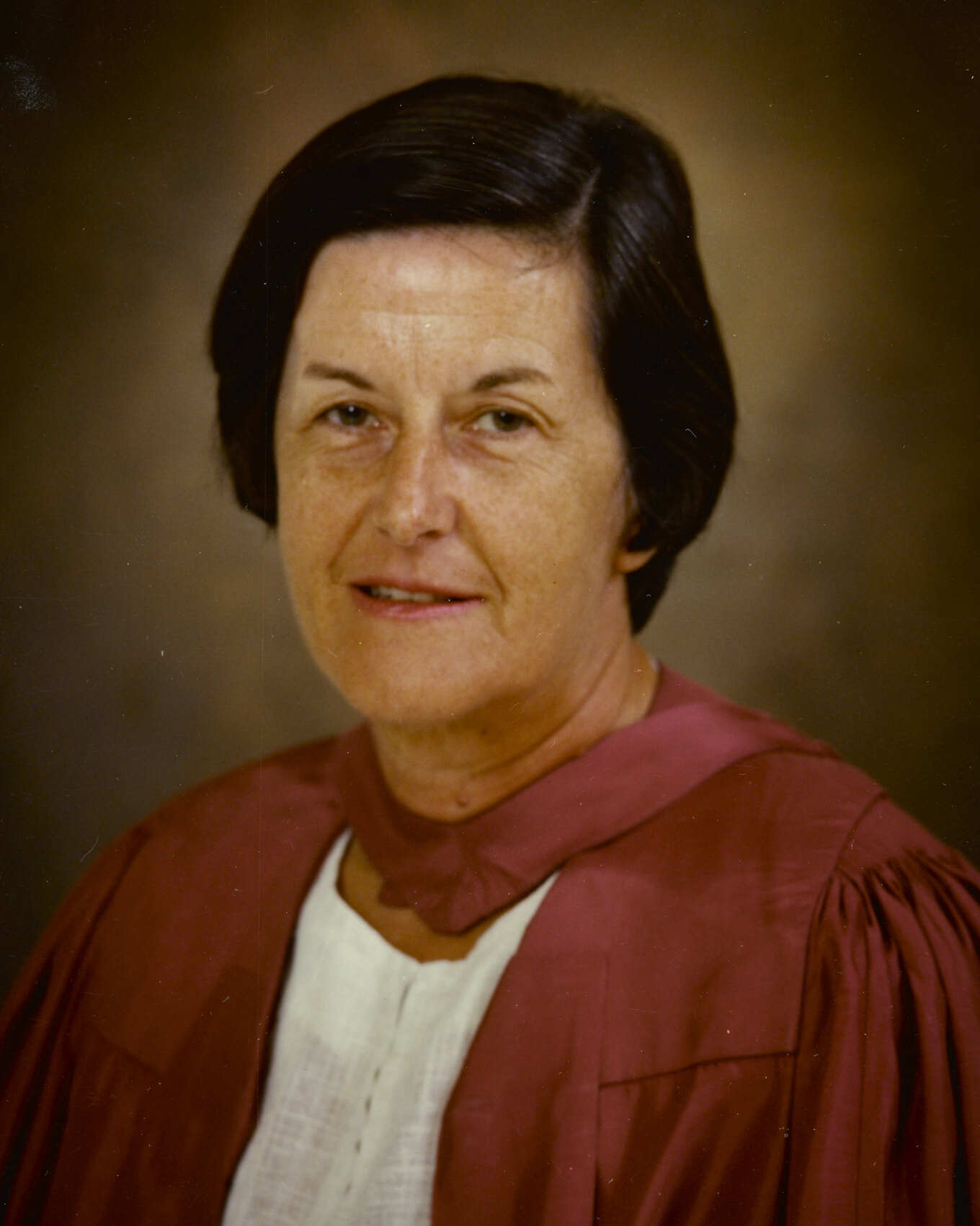
- Loutit in 1981
- Born: Margaret Wyn Jeffery; 5 September 1929; Burra, South Australia, Australia
- Died: 7 May 2020 (aged 90); Auckland, New Zealand
- Education: University of Adelaide; University of Otago
- Spouse: John Stuart Loutit (m. 1952; died 2012)
- Children: 3
- Scientific career
- Fields: Microbiology
- Workplaces: University of Otago
- Thesis: The effect of microorganisms on the availability of trace elements to plants (1966)

Margaret Wyn Loutit CBE (née Jeffery; 5 September 1929 – 7 May 2020) was a New Zealand microbiologist. She was a full professor at the University of Otago from 1981, and was the inaugural director of the university's Research Office from 1988 to 1995

== Early life and family ==
Born in the rural South Australian town of Burra on 5 September 1929, Loutit was the daughter of Marjorie Oliver Jeffery (née River) and Roy Joseph Jeffery. She was educated at Burra High School and Methodist Ladies' College, Adelaide, and went on to study at the University of Adelaide, graduating BSc (Hons) in 1951 and MSc in 1954.

In 1952, she married John Stuart Loutit, also a microbiologist, and the couple went on to have three children.

== Research and academic career ==
Loutit and her family moved to Dunedin in New Zealand in 1956 when her husband was appointed as a lecturer in microbiology at the University of Otago. After some years as a homemaker, Margaret Loutit became a part-time lecturer in microbiology at the University of Otago in 1959, and began doctoral studies in 1962. Her PhD thesis, completed in 1966, was titled The effect of microorganisms on the availability of trace elements to plants.

The following year, Loutit was appointed as a lecturer in microbiology at Otago, rising to become a full professor in 1981. Her research was mainly concerned with water and soil microbiology, initially concentrating on the effects of bacteria on the uptake of metals by plants, and then in the related area of the role of bacteria transferring metals through the food chain. She later investigated the survival of microorganisms in aquatic environments and significance of microorganisms in the assessment of water quality and public health. Upon her retirement from the Department of Microbiology in 1991, Loutit was conferred with the title of professor emeritus.

Loutit played a key role in the establishment of the University of Otago's Research and Development Office, and served as its inaugural director, from 1988 until 1995. She was also director of the university's Aquaculture Research Centre from 1986 to 1990, and was president of the Bacteriology Division of the International Union of Microbiological Societies between 1989 and 1990.

== Honours and awards ==
In the 1996 New Year Honours, Loutit was appointed a Commander of the Order of the British Empire, for services to science.

== Later life and death ==
Loutit was predeceased by her husband, John, in 2012. She died in Auckland on 7 May 2020.
