= Manu v Steelink Contracting Services Ltd =

- Court: Wellington Employment Court
- Full case name: James Manu v Steelink Contracting Services Limited
- Decided: 18 February 1998
- Citation: WEC2/98
- Transcript: copy of judgment

Court membership
- Judge sitting: Goddard CJ

Keywords
- casual employee, wrongful dismissal

Manu v Steelink Contracting Services Ltd WEC2/98, often referred to as "Steelink", was an important employment case in New Zealand, where an employer tried to dismiss a worker through the back door on the basis that the employee was merely a casual employee, meaning that the employer did not have to go through the dismissal process to dismiss an employee.

== Background ==
Mr Manu worked as a scaffolder in the oil and gas industry in Taranaki for Steelink, and at first in 1990, he was clearly hired as a casual employee, but in 1993 management informed him he was now a permanent employee.

In September 1995, Steelink provided its employees with individual contracts to replace their collective agreement, which had the following contentious clause:

5. TERMS OF EMPLOYMENT

(b) ….

(ii) The parties agree that due to the nature of the work, demand may fluctuate and the employee may from time to time be stood down without his contract terminating. The employee shall endeavour to give two paid days' notice of any such stand-down. During any stand-down periods no remuneration shall be payable. The employee may resume work when required by the employer under the same terms and conditions as in this contract.

While Manu objected to this clause, he nonetheless signed the agreement anyway. Other employees challenged the agreement and had the agreement changed.

Not happy with what had happened, Manu raised his concerns with the union and also went on strike in support, resulting in the employer resorting back to collective agreements.

Two months later on 13 November 2005 out of the blue, Steelink notified Manu that they were going to put him on indefinite leave. During the 2-day notice period, Manu did not unload a truck as he claimed he was unaware it had arrived. His employer's response was "Well, you can just fuck off now then—and I am not paying you for the rest of the day because you haven't done anything".

Manu left work and never returned, and immediately lodged a person grievance for wrongful dismissal. Steelinks lawyers replied that he was not dismissed, and made the laughable claim that "further employment may be offered to him", which ultimately never happened.

In February 2006, upon learning that Manu was now working for another firm, Steelink wrote to him saying they had outstanding monies owing to him, namely holiday pay, and asked how he would like to collect it.

Not surprisingly, Steelink never offered Manu any more work, and many months later admitted it could have hired him at the Kapuni site, but claimed Manu had acted "threatening" towards a fellow employee, and that it would be a "health and safety" issue to employ him there.

Manu ultimately claimed he was a permanent employee, that he was dismissed, as well as wrongfully dismissed at that. His main argument was that the casual clause was "harsh and oppressive", asking the court to set aside this clause.

Steelink then applied unsuccessfully to the High Court for Manu's action to be struck out claiming it was without merit and was frivolous or vexatious.

== Decision ==
The Employment Court ruled that while the circumstances regarding Manu signing the individual agreement was not harsh or oppressive, it did rule that the casual clause should be set aside because it was harsh; namely it made him a casual employee, with no compensation for this inferior status.

The short answer is that the employer has some scope, however limited in practice, for passing on its price structure while the employee has no such ability and has received no benefit in exchange for the introduction of the provision. It is far too severe and, however desirable it may be from the employer's point of view, it is, in its contractual and industrial context, so one-side that it cannot survive scrutiny. It is harsh and oppressive and must be set aside. Clause 5(b)(ii) is therefore deleted from the collective employment contract.

The Court also ruled that Manu was not dismissed in November 1995, but the decision in February to pay out his holiday pay was ruled as a dismissal, so the court awarded Manu $8,644 in damages. The court did not give any credence to Steelink's claim that Manu acted aggressively because the first they mentioned it was several months after it claimed it had happened.

As a footnote, the judge said that Steelink also had a redundancy clause, where they could have arguably instead made Manu redundant with only having to pay only one week's pay in redundancy.
