= Sainty =

Sainty is a surname. Notable people with the surname include:

- Guy Stair Sainty (born 1950), art dealer and author on royal genealogy and heraldry
- Sir John Sainty (1934–2025), English civil servant
- John Sainty (footballer) (1946–2023), professional football player and manager
- Marilyn Sainty (born 1947), New Zealand fashion and furniture designer
- Russ Sainty (1936–2021), English pop singer

== See also ==
- Jiangsu Sainty F.C., Chinese football club
