= 1996 New Year Honours (New Zealand) =

Annual awards for New Zealanders

The 1996 New Year Honours in New Zealand were appointments by Elizabeth II in her right as Queen of New Zealand, on the advice of the New Zealand government, to various orders and honours to reward and highlight good works by New Zealanders, and to celebrate the passing of 1995 and the beginning of 1996. They were announced on 30 December 1995.

The recipients of honours are displayed here as they were styled before their new honour.

This was the last list to include British Honours appointed by the Monarch of New Zealand.

== Knight Bachelor ==
- Dr William Ian Axford – of Napier. For services to science.

== Order of the Bath ==
=== Companion (CB) ===
Military division

- Rear Admiral John Edwin Nugent Welch – Chief of Naval Staff, Royal New Zealand Navy.

== Order of Saint Michael and Saint George ==
=== Knight Grand Cross (GCMG) ===
- The Right Honourable (Justice) Michael Hardie Boys – of Wellington; Governor-General Designate of New Zealand.
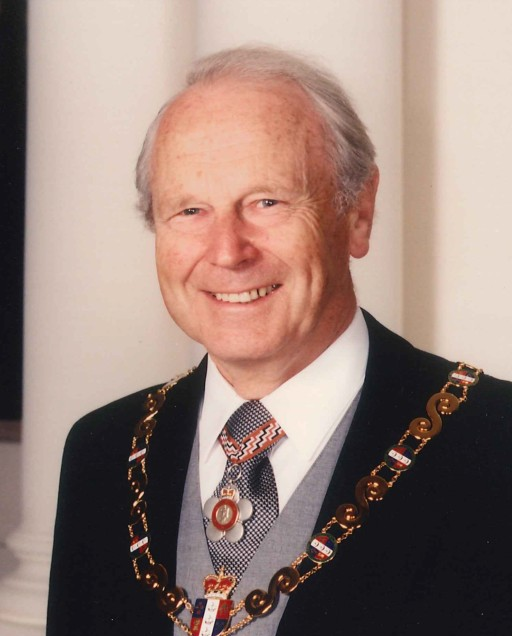
Sir Michael Hardie Boys

=== Companion (CMG) ===
- Patrick George Morrison – of Darfield. For services to the wool industry.

== Order of the British Empire ==
=== Dame Commander (DBE) ===
Civil division

- Gillian Constance Weir CBE – of Tilehurst, England. For services to music.

=== Commander (CBE) ===
Civil division

- (Jacqueline) Nancy Mary Adams QSO – of Wellington. For services to botany.
- Emeritus Professor Bruce Grandison Biggs OBE – of Auckland. For services to education and the Māori people.
- Major Eunice Mary Eichler – of Auckland. For services to welfare work.
- John Herbert Heslop – of Dunedin. For services to medicine, sport and the community.
- Emeritus Professor Margaret Wyn Loutit – of Dunedin. For services to science.
- Grant Stewart Ellis Milne – of Auckland. For services to the transport industry.
- Rose Rangimarie Turuki Lambert Pere – of Waikaremoana. For services to Māori education.
- The Honourable Koro Tainui Wētere MP – of Wellington. For services to the Māori people.
- Mona Guilford Wikaira QSO JP – of Te Awamutu. For services to the community.

Military division

- Air Commodore Graeme James Wharton Goldsmith AFC – Royal New Zealand Air Force.
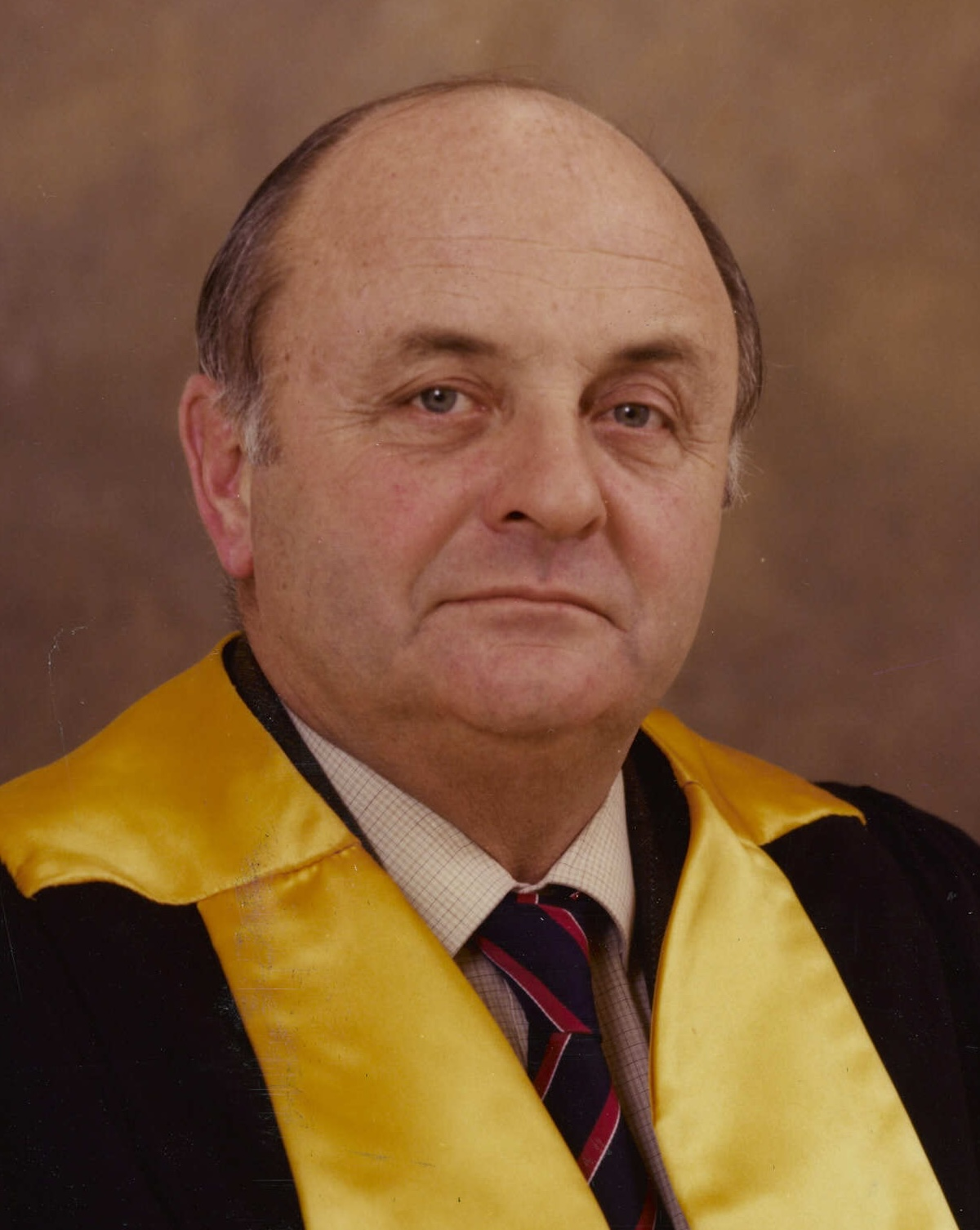
John Heslop

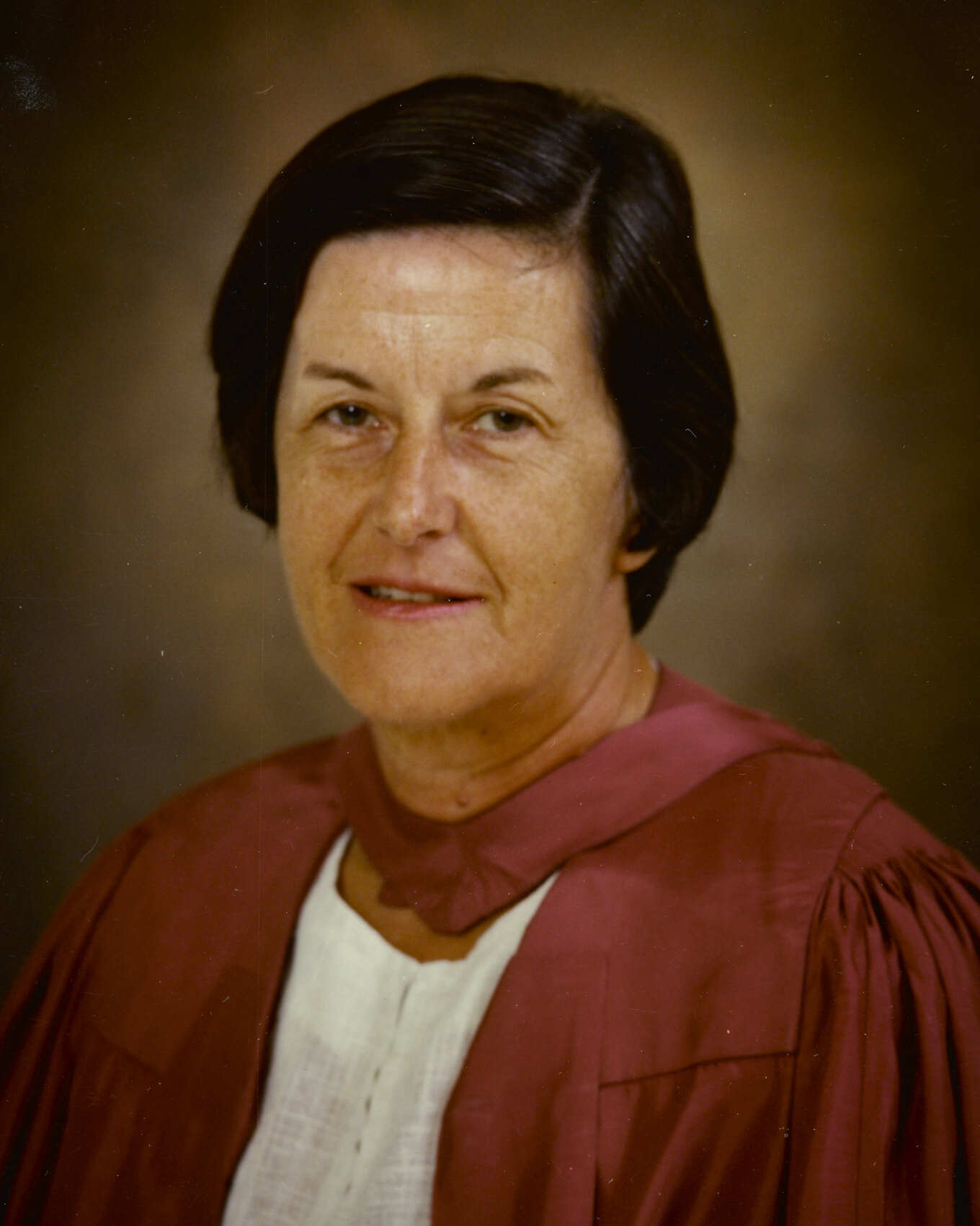
Margaret Loutit

=== Officer (OBE) ===
Civil division

- Betina Adams – of Walton. For services to bowls.
- Fleur Adcock – of Wellington. For services to literature.
- Anthony John Anselmi – of Te Kūiti. For services to manufacturing.
- Barry Edward Brill JP – of Auckland. For services to manufacturing.
- Richard John Fraser – of Auckland. For service to engineering and the community.
- Dr Ruth Elizabeth Harley – of Wellington. For services to broadcasting.
- Ieuan John Honnor – of New Plymouth. For services to the community.
- Jean Alice Horsley – of Auckland. For services to art.
- Dr Thomas Harry Marshall – of Auckland. For services to medicine and the community.
- Guilford Montgomerie-Davidson JP – of Wellington. For services to business management and the community.
- Marcia Grace Russell – of Auckland. For services to journalism.
- Dr William Stanley Simpson – of Christchurch. For services to the wool industry.
- Richard Norman Somerfield – of Tauranga. For services to the handicapped and the berryfruit industry.
- Suzanne Helen Suckling – of Christchurch. For services to business management.
- Connell Percy Thode – of Auckland. For services to yachting.
- Dawn Marie Wylie – of Greytown. For services to business development.

Military division

- Group Captain Donald Miller Hamilton – Royal New Zealand Air Force.
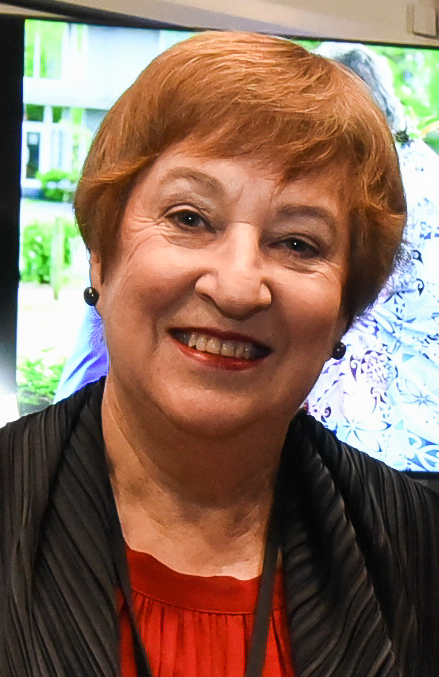
Ruth Harley

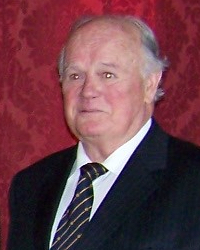
Giff Davidson

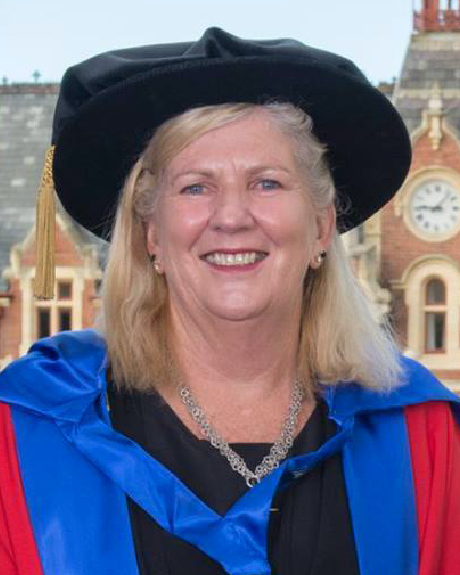
Sue Suckling

=== Member (MBE) ===
Civil division

- William George Auld JP – of Mosgiel. For services to rugby and the community.
- David Bay JP – of Te Aroha. For services to the dairy industry and the community.
- Helen Brew – of Wellington. For services to the community.
- Barbara Douglas Cox – of Auckland. For services to soccer.
- Kenneth Ewen Stanley Fenwick ED – of Hamilton. For services to aviation.
- Graham Scott Fuller JP – of Blenheim. For services to the community.
- George Alexander Harford – of Tauranga. For services to agriculture and tourism.
- Stanley Frank Hill – of Christchurch. For services to rugby.
- William James Kelso – of Wellington. For services to the community.
- Thomas George Alan Kiely – of Auckland. For services to tennis and the community.
- Malcolm Edward Law JP – of Whakatāne. For services to farming and the community.
- Dr Gam Poy Lee JP – of Auckland. For services to medicine and the community.
- Jeanette Maud McIntyre – of Gore. For services to the community.
- Bronwyn Anne Monopoli – of Nelson. For services to business management.
- Mary Margaret Mourant – of Auckland. For services to the community.
- John Rodney Nimon – of Havelock North. For services to business management and the community.
- Dr Dorothy Pauline Page – of Dunedin. For services to the community.
- Captain Leslie Malcolm Page – of Christchurch. For services to aviation.
- Lynette Therese Pivac – of Auckland. For services to the deaf.
- June Elaine Read – of Wellington. For services to mental health.
- Ronald Jack Scarlett – of Christchurch. For services to science.
- Tuerei O Arera Taramai JP – of Lower Hutt. For services to the community.
- Bridget Rosamund Williams – of Wellington. For services to book publishing.
- Helen Elizabeth Winter – of Blenheim. For services to the girl guides.

Military division

- Lieutenant Commander Edward David James Isaac – Royal New Zealand Navy.
- Warrant Officer Terrence Lund Whimp – Royal New Zealand Navy.
- Major Jonathan Peter Broadley – Royal New Zealand Corps of Transport.
- Major Arthur David Gawn – Royal New Zealand Infantry Regiment.
- Warrant Officer Robert Joseph Cox – Royal New Zealand Air Force.
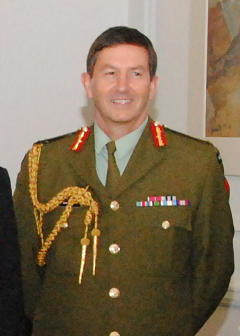
Dave Gawn

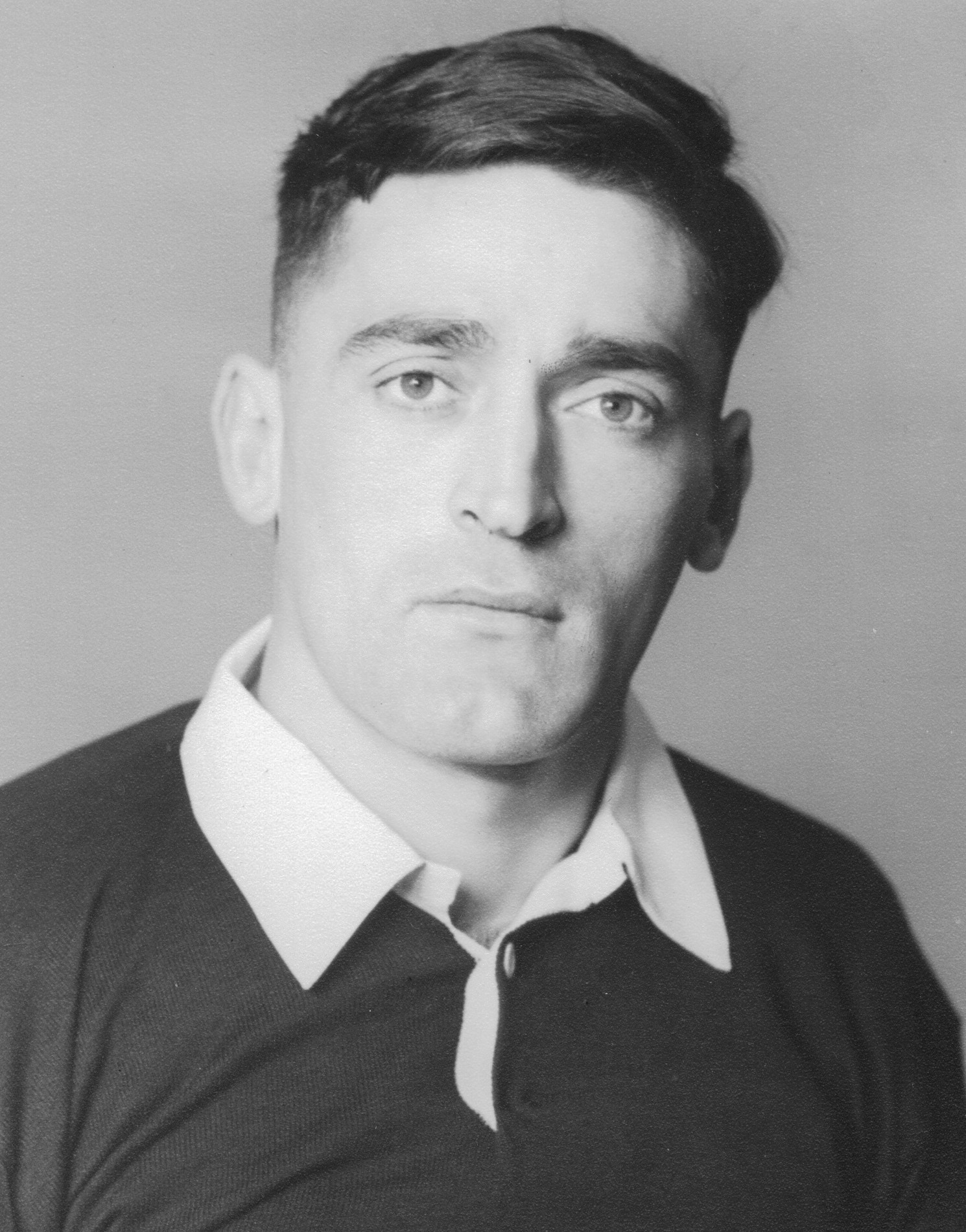
Tiny Hill

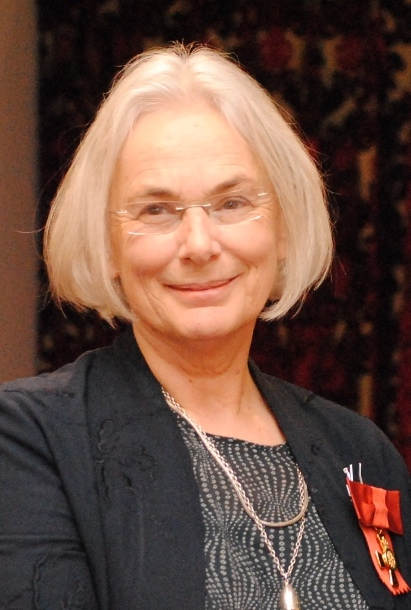
Bridget Williams

== Companion of the Queen's Service Order (QSO) ==
=== For community service ===
- Wilfred Henry Colley – of Christchurch.
- Arthur Richard Paton Eustace – of Ōtaki.
- Alexia Helen Pickering JP – of Hamilton.
- Alan McKenzie Smith JP – of Invercargill.
- Elizabeth Mary Tait – of Napier.
- The Reverend Arthur John Templeton – of Dunedin.

=== For public services ===
- Maxine Arnold – of Porirua.
- Irene Ann Crawford JP – of Ngongotahā.
- Carole Joyce Evans JP – of Christchurch.
- Margaret Alice Fitzgerald – of Lower Hutt.
- Dr John Peter Larkindale – of Wellington.
- Dr Edward Colin Selby Little MBE – of Auckland.
- Winifred Potter JP – of Pukekohe.
- The Honourable Frances Helen Wilde – of Wellington.
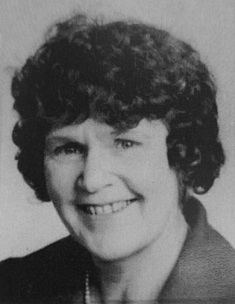
Maxine Arnold

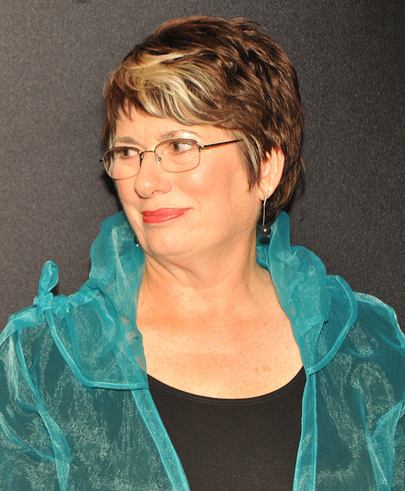
Fran Wilde

== Queen's Service Medal (QSM) ==
=== For community service ===
- Joan Bullock-Morrell – of Wanganui.
- Phyllis Kathleen Chapman – of Pleasant Point.
- Myra Ella Chase – of Oamaru.
- Yeraleena Mary Chick – of Dargaville.
- Majorie Joan Codlin – of Auckland.
- Emma Alice Birdie Cowsill – of Pukekohe.
- Trevor Darcy Down JP – of Auckland.
- Patricia Kathleen Duncan – of Rakaia.
- Vera Fenton – of Auckland.
- Johanna Mary Frances Galvin (Sister Loyola Galvin) – of Wellington.
- Aubrey George Harris JP – of Te Kūiti.
- Mary Ellen Carmel Horan (Sister Mary Carmel) – of Hamilton.
- Ngaire Lee – of Rotorua.
- Susan Moya Lytollis – of Auckland.
- Nicholas Graham Metzger – of Bluff.
- James Patrick Moriarty – of Wellington.
- Elizabeth Morrison – of Auckland.
- Shirley Margaret Mary Murphy – of New Plymouth.
- Amiria Jaro Ngairo – of Greytown.
- Phyllis Emily Nuttall – of Auckland.
- Raymond John Peek – of Mataura.
- Ormond Poppleton JP – of Palmerston North.
- Grant Wayne Quinn – of Lower Hutt.
- Atawua Robati – of Auckland.
- Leslie Percy Robert – of Palmerston North.
- John Alexander Robinson – of Auckland.
- Susan Jane Ruffell – of Blenheim.
- Angela Joan Scott – of Tauranga.
- Nola Mary Simpson – of Palmerston North.
- Norman Leslie Skilton – of Auckland.
- Jo-Anne Sopoaga – of Pukerua Bay.
- Denni Dionysios Soulis – of Wellington.
- Violet Orleen Stephens – of Upper Hutt.
- Beryl Eileen Stewart JP – of Whangārei.
- Mary (Mollie) Eliza Courtenay Townshend – of Darfield.
- Frank Vilich – of Auckland.
- Tepara Mabel Waititi – of Kawakawa.
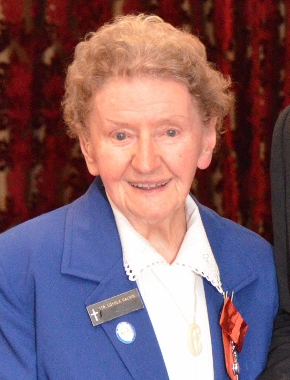
Sister Loyola Galvin

=== For public services ===
- Ernest Kenyon Alexander – of Pukekohe.
- Beverley Ratene Anaru – of Rotorua.
- Wilfred Canning JP – of Waiheke Island.
- Rosemary Ruth Carr – of Christchurch.
- William Alan Cleghorn JP – of Rotorua.
- Pansy Nell Cogger – of Greymouth.
- Florence Joya Wynne Costley – of Wanganui.
- Elsie Elizabeth Davison – of Wellington.
- Grace Emilee Evans – of Napier.
- Alexander Topham Fletcher – of Levin.
- Gerald Carolan Grace JP – of Stratford.
- Jack Lawson Inglis – of Motueka.
- Laurie Desmond King – of Christchurch.
- June Levet – of Wellsford.
- Leonard Stanly Lulich JP – of Dargaville.
- Gerald Allister John McDonald – of Masterton.
- John Howard McGhie – of Mosgiel.
- Robert Ewan Miln MM – of Te Kūiti.
- Neville John Carl Moller – of Auckland.
- Alan John Monk – sergeant, New Zealand Police.
- Eric James Murtagh – of Auckland.
- William James Noster – senior chief traffic sergeant, New Zealand Police.
- Ivan Raymond Oakley – of Ashburton
- Jack William Paraha – of Rotorua.
- Bernard Francis Ross – of Auckland.
- Edward Robert Stewart – of Woodville.
- Elizabeth Valante Stewart JP – of Nelson.
- John Frederick Thomson – of Wellington.
- Francis Arthur John Timblick – of Geraldine.
Jack Inglis

== British Empire Medal (BEM) ==
Military division

- Lance Corporal Awanui-a-Rangi Melbourne – Royal New Zealand Infantry Regiment.
- Sergeant Abraham Paul Pourau – Royal New Zealand Corps of Transport.
- Flight Sergeant James Ross Connochie – Royal New Zealand Air Force.

== Air Force Cross (AFC) ==
- Wing Commander Gavin John Howse – Royal New Zealand Air Force.

== Queen's Fire Services Medal (QFSM) ==
- Chief Fire Commander Trevor James Bean – Auckland Fire Brigade, New Zealand Fire Service.
- Chief Fire Officer Alan Stuart Cockburn – New Brighton Volunteer Fire Brigade, New Zealand Fire Service.
- Station Officer Arthur Donald Drower – Tokoroa Volunteer Fire Brigade, New Zealand Fire Service.

== Queen's Police Medal (QPM) ==
- Detective Inspector Anthony John Manning – of Auckland; New Zealand Police.
