= Lee v Minor Developments Ltd =

New Zealand Employment Court decision

Lee v Minor Developments Ltd t/a Before Six Childcare Centre
- Court: Employment Court of New Zealand
- Full case name: Sharon Lee v Minor Developments Ltd t/a Before Six Childcare Centre
- Decided: 23 December 2008
- Citation: AC 52/08 ARC 16/08
- Transcript: Judgement of Judge C M Shaw

Court membership
- Judges sitting: Shaw, C M

Case opinions
- Couch, A A

Keywords
- Employment relations, casual employee

Lee v Minor Developments Ltd t/a Before Six Childcare Centre was a decision of the Employment Court of New Zealand regarding the real status of a worker as either a permanent employee or a casual employee. The case concerned whether or not the Employment Relations Authority had erred in law by determining that Sharon Lee was a casual employee of Oceana Gold (NZ) Ltd.

== Judgment ==
Judge C M Shaw delivered the Employment Court's decision allowing Lee's appeal and overturning the decision of the Employment Relations Authority.

Judge Shaw outlined the following characteristics as being those which the courts have used to assess whether employment is casual:

- Engagement for short periods of time for specific purposes;
- A lack of regular work pattern or expectation of ongoing employment;
- Employment is dependent on the availability of work demands;
- No guarantee of work from one week to the next;
- Employment as and when needed;
- The lack of an obligation on the employer to offer employment, or on the employee to accept any other engagement; and
- Employees are only engaged for the specific term of each period of employment.

== See also ==
- Jinkinson v Oceana Gold (NZ) Ltd
