= Jinkinson v Oceana Gold (NZ) Ltd =

- Court: Employment Court of New Zealand
- Full case name: Tracey Jinkinson v Oceana Gold (NZ) Ltd
- Decided: 13 August 2009
- Citation: [2009] CC 9/09 CRC 4/08
- Transcript: Judgement of Judge A A Couch

Court membership
- Judges sitting: Couch, A A

Case opinions
- Couch, A A

Keywords
- Employment relations, casual employee

Jinkinson v Oceana Gold (NZ) Ltd was a 2009 decision of the Employment Court of New Zealand regarding the real status of a worker as either a permanent employee or a casual employee. The case concerned whether or not the Employment Relations Authority had erred in law by determining that Jinkinson was a casual employee of Oceana Gold (NZ) Ltd.

== Judgment ==
Judge AA Couch delivered the Employment Court's decision allowing Jinkinson's challenge and overturning the decision of the Employment Relations Authority.

The essence of casual employment is that an employment relationship exists only during periods of work or engagement to work and the parties have no obligations to each other in between such periods. Where the employment relationship is ongoing, a wide range of statutory rights and duties, together with some derived from the common law, apply continuously until the relationship is terminated. Those rights include access to the personal grievance process”

Whatever the nature of the employment relationship, the parties will have mutual obligations during periods of actual work or engagement. The distinction between casual employment and ongoing employment lies in the extent to which the parties have mutual employment related obligations between periods of work. If those obligations only exist during periods of work, the employment will be regarded as casual. If there are mutual obligations which continue between periods of work, there will be an ongoing employment relationship"

== See also ==
- Lee v Minor Developments Ltd
