= Sue Suckling =

New Zealand businesswoman and commercial director

Sue Suckling OBE
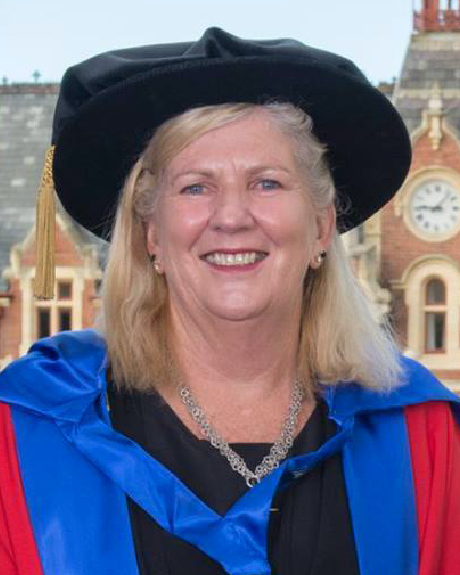
- Suckling in 2015
- Born: 1957 or 1958
- Citizenship: New Zealander
- Occupations: Businesswoman, commercial director
- Awards: Officer of the Order of the British Empire (OBE), Distinguished Fellow of the Institute of Directors (DistFInstD)

Suzanne Helen Suckling OBE (born 1957 or 1958) is a businesswoman and commercial director from New Zealand.

Suckling was raised in Hamilton, in the North Island of New Zealand, and studied at Massey University in Palmerston North. She then moved to Christchurch to lecture at Lincoln University for two years. Following this she worked as a food technologist in the meat industry and became chief executive at Pacific Foods, a joint venture between Waitaki Refrigerated and a German company. She then worked at a merchant bank, and was later appointed to the Trade Development Board.

Suckling has held a number of positions in governance, including chair of ECL Group Ltd, Jacobsen Pacific Ltd, New Zealand Qualifications Authority, Jade Software, Lincoln Agritech Hub and founding chair of Callaghan Innovation. She is also a director of Sky City Entertainment Group and a former director of NIWA, AgriQuality Limited, Westpac and the New Zealand Dairy Board.

In 2018 Suckling was appointed chair of the Insurance & Financial Services Ombudsman Scheme Commission.

== Recognition ==
Suckling was named the inaugural New Zealand Business Woman of the Year in 1985, at the age of 27. In the 1996 New Year Honours, she was appointed an Officer of the Order of the British Empire, for services to business management. In 2015, Suckling was awarded an honorary doctorate in science by Lincoln University. She is a Companion of the Royal Society of New Zealand.
