= Taylor v Beere =

- Court: Court of Appeal of New Zealand
- Full case name: Alister Taylor v Margaret Lorraine Beere
- Decided: 19 March 1982
- Citation: [1982] 1 NZLR 81
- Transcript: High Court judgment

Court membership
- Judges sitting: Cooke P, Richardson J, Somers J

Keywords
- negligence, defamation, exemplary damages

Taylor v Beere [1982] 1 NZLR 81 is a cited case in New Zealand regarding exemplary damages in tort

== Background ==
Mrs Beere had one of her friends who was an amateur photographer take a photograph of her and her granddaughter in their home.

In 1972, Beere discovered that another friend, controversial publisher Alister Taylor, had obtained the negative, and was planning to print a guidebook for teenagers called "Down under the Plum Trees" about sex, alcohol and drug use featuring this photo.

Beere wrote to Taylor, demanding that her photo not be used in his book, but Taylor included this photo in the first 10,000 books.

Her photo featuring in such a book caused Beere embarrassment, as people thought she had agreed to be in the book.

As a result, Beere sued for defamation.

== Held ==
Beere was awarded $12,500 in damages, which included an award for exemplary damages.
