= Helen Beaglehole =

New Zealand writer and historian

- Born: Helen Elizabeth Bisley; 27 November 1946 (age 78) Hamilton, New Zealand
- Occupation: Writer; editor; historian
- Education: Victoria University of Wellington; Wellington Teachers' College
- Period: 1993–present
- Genre: Children's literature; historical non-fiction
- Spouse: Tim Beaglehole (m. 1966; died 2015)
- Children: 3

Helen Elizabeth Beaglehole (née Bisley; born 27 November 1946) is a New Zealand writer, editor and historian. She is known for her children's books including Two Tigers (1993) and War Zones (2005), and her historical books about New Zealand's lighthouses and rural fire-fighting.

== Biography ==
Beaglehole was born in Hamilton on 27 November 1946. She attended Victoria University of Wellington, obtaining a Bachelor of Arts degree in 1968. She subsequently obtained a teaching diploma in 1978 from Wellington Teachers' College and worked as a teacher until 1980. From 1980 to 1994, she held various policy analyst positions for the New Zealand government, including working as a senior policy analyst for the Ministry of Commerce and the Ministry of Women's Affairs.

In 1991, Beaglehole studied creative writing under Bill Manhire at the International Institute of Modern Letters. She became a freelance editor and writer after leaving government. She chaired the Wellington branch of the New Zealand Society of Authors from 1995 to 1997. She is a contributor to Te Ara: The Encyclopedia of New Zealand and the Dictionary of New Zealand Biography.

Beaglehole has written a number of books for children and young adults. Notably, the best-selling children's picture book Two Tigers (1993) was shortlisted for the Picture Book Award at the AIM Children's Book Awards in 1994 and for the Russell Clark Award for illustration. Her young-adult novel War Zones (2005) was shortlisted for the Esther Glen Award in 2006.

Beaglehole spent five years researching and writing Lighting the Coast: A History of New Zealand's Coastal Lighthouse System, which was published in 2006. It was the first complete history of New Zealand's lighthouse system. The work was inspired by her love for the New Zealand coast and sailing. Her research was made more difficult by the fact that many of New Zealand's maritime records were lost in the 1907 Parliament House fire and the 1952 Hope Gibbons building fire. In 2004 she received an Award in Oral History from the Department of Internal Affairs about her work interviewing lighthouse keepers. In 2009, she published a sequel to the work, Always the Sound of the Sea: The Daily Lives of New Zealand's Lighthouse Keepers.

Beaglehole's third historical book, Fire in the Hills: A History of Rural Firefighting in New Zealand (2012), was described by the Otago Daily Times as "an impressively wide-ranging, scholarly history".

== Personal life ==
Beaglehole has a twin sister called Anne. On 4 June 1966, she married academic Tim Beaglehole, who died in July 2015. They had two sons and a daughter, and shared a passion for sailing.

== Selected works ==
=== Children's books ===
- — (1993). Two Tigers. Illustrated by Lesley Moyes. Wellington, NZ: Shearwater Books. ISBN 090886406X.
- — (1996). Strange Company. Whatamango Bay, NZ: Cape Catley. ISBN 0908561482.
- — (1999). Plum Stones. Illustrated by Craig Smith. Port Melbourne, Australia: Roland Harvey Books. ISBN 0949714631.
- — (1999). John's Remarkable Day. Illustrated by Craig Smith. Port Melbourne, Australia: Roland Harvey Books. ISBN 094971464X.

=== Young-adult fiction ===
- — (1997). The Family Album. Whatamango Bay, N.Z: Cape Catley. ISBN 9780908561582.
- — (1998). Because He's My Brother. Wellington, NZ: Mallinson Rendel. ISBN 9780908783311.
- — (1999). Hanging On Letting Go. Wellington, NZ: Mallinson Rendel. ISBN 0908783477.
- — (2005). War Zones: a novel. Wellington, NZ: Steele Roberts. ISBN 187733880X.

=== Non-fiction ===
- — (2006). Lighting the Coast: a history of New Zealand's coastal lighthouse system. Christchurch, NZ: University of Canterbury Press. ISBN 9781877257438.
- — (2009). Always the Sound of the Sea: the daily lives of New Zealand's lighthouse keepers. Nelson, NZ: Craig Potton Publishing. ISBN 9781877333996.
- — (2012). Fire in the Hills: a history of rural fire-fighting in New Zealand. Christchurch, NZ: Canterbury University Press. ISBN 9781927145357.
- — (2022). One Hundred Havens: the settlement of the Marlborough Sounds. Auckland, NZ: Massey University Press. ISBN 9780995143197.
- — (2023). Light and Reflections: the house and the art in our lives. With photos by Matthew O'Reilly. Wellington, NZ: The Cuba Press. ISBN 9781988595719.
