= Ann Beaglehole =

New Zealand writer and historian

- Born: Szegoe Aniko; 1948 (age 77–78); Siklós, Hungary
- Education: Victoria University of Wellington (PhD in history)
- Occupations: Historian; novelist
- Spouse: David Beaglehole (divorced)
- Children: 3

Academic background
- Thesis: Facing the Past: Looking Back at Refugee Childhood in New Zealand (1990)
- Doctoral advisor: Malcolm McKinnon

Ann Beaglehole (née Szegoe; born 1948) is a New Zealand writer and historian. In the 1950s, her family emigrated from Hungary to New Zealand as refugees following the Hungarian Revolution. She earned a PhD in history and a master's degree in creative writing from Victoria University of Wellington, and has written extensively on the history of immigration to New Zealand, including the history of Jewish immigrants and refugees. In addition to a number of non-fiction history works, she has also written a semi-autobiographical novel about the experiences of a Hungarian Jewish refugee in New Zealand and a memoir.

She is a recipient of New Zealand Founders' Society Annual Research Award and New Zealand History Research Trust Fund Award.

== Life and career ==
Beaglehole was born in Siklós, Hungary, in 1948. Her family left Hungary in 1956 and moved to Wellington, New Zealand, in 1957, when Ann was eight, as refugees following the Hungarian Revolution. Her family and background are Jewish. During World War II her mother pretended to be non-Jewish and her father had to work as a slave labourer. She has written: "While I have discarded most aspects of Jewishness, my feelings about the Jewish past—about the experiences of persecution, loss, displacement associated with it—remain strong." She obtained a master's degree in history with distinction from Victoria University of Wellington, followed by a PhD in history and a master's degree in creative writing (studying under Bill Manhire). She had three children through her marriage to David Beaglehole, which ended in divorce.

She has written a number of historical books and essays, many of which are focussed on the experiences of refugees during World War II or refugees in New Zealand, particularly Jewish refugees. In Far from the Promised Land? Being Jewish in New Zealand (1995), co-authored with Hal Levine, she wrote about what it means to be Jewish in New Zealand. Reviewer Jack Shallcrass found it "informative" and "touching", with "the vivid immediacy of informed individual opinion and reaction". Her semi-autobiographical novel, Replacement Girl (2002), tells the story of a young Jewish woman emigrating from Hungary to New Zealand as a refugee in the 1950s. A review in The Nelson Mail said Beaglehole "writes with sensitivity towards her characters and her readers, and with honest humour".

She was a contributor to the Dictionary of New Zealand Biography and to Te Ara: The Encyclopedia of New Zealand. In addition to her writing and work as a historian, she has worked as a policy analyst for Te Puni Kōkiri and the Department of Internal Affairs, and as a researcher for the Waitangi Tribunal. In 2016 she spoke at the National Library of New Zealand on the 60th anniversary of the Hungarian Revolution, and questioned why New Zealand is less open today to refugees than it was in the 1950s. In 2017 she criticised New Zealand's stance on refugees in an article for Stuff, observing that since 2001 the country had "focused on improving border security and making provisions to detain asylum seekers".

In 2025, Beaglehole published her memoir, How to Be an Alien. It covers her family's life under the Nazi and Communist regimes in Hungary, their escape as refugees in 1956 and their resettlement in New Zealand. A review in The Post described it as an "engrossing and fascinating read".

== Awards ==
Beaglehole has received a number of awards and fellowships, including:

- The F.P. Wilson Prize for New Zealand History (1986)
- The Claude McCarthy Fellow, Victoria University of Wellington (1992–1993)
- New Zealand History Research Trust Fund Award in History (1993)
- New Zealand Founders' Society Annual Research Award for historical research (1998)
- Goethe-Institut Scholarship as Cultural Ambassador in Berlin (2001)
- International Writers Residency at Ledig House, New York (2006)
- Research Fellowship at Swinburne University of Technology in Melbourne (2006–2007)
- Residency at the Michael King Writers Centre (2009)

== Selected works ==
In addition to journal articles and chapters in other published works, Beaglehole has written the following books:

=== History books ===
- A Small Price to Pay: Refugees from Hitler in New Zealand, 1936-1946 (1988)
- Facing the Past: Looking Back at Refugee Childhood in New Zealand (1990)
- Far from the Promised Land? Being Jewish in New Zealand (1995) (with Hal Levine)
- The History of the Eastern Bays of Wellington Harbour (2001)
- Refuge New Zealand: a nation's response to refugees and asylum seekers (2013)

=== Other work ===
- Replacement Girl (novel, 2002)
- How to Be an Alien: A sort of memoir (memoir, 2026)
