= Ruth Beaglehole =

New Zealand-born American educator (1943–2025)

- Born: 30 August 1943; Wellington, New Zealand
- Died: April 21, 2025 (aged 81); Los Angeles, California, U.S.
- Education: Trained preschool teacher (New Zealand)
- Occupation: Educator · Child development specialist · Parenting advocate
- Years active: c. 1960s–2025
- Employer(s): LAUSD; Center for Nonviolent Education and Parenting/Echo Parenting & Education
- Known for: Founder of Echo Park‑Silver Lake People’s Playgroup; advocate for nonviolent parenting education
- Spouse: Art Goldberg (m. – ?)
- Children: 3 (including Rabbi Susan Goldberg)
- Relatives: Sister‑in‑law of epidemiologist Ruth Bonita Beaglehole and politician Jackie Goldberg
- Awards: Emmy‑featured documentary Power to the Playgroup; numerous children’s services/community awards

Ruth Beaglehole (August 30, 1943 – April 21, 2025) was a New Zealand-born American educator and child development specialist based in Los Angeles, California. She advocated for nonviolent parenting and worked in early childhood education and parent education in Los Angeles for more than fifty years.

== Early life and immigration ==
Beaglehole was born at Alexandra Maternity Hospital in Wellington, New Zealand on August 30, 1943. Her parents were New Zealander Ernest Beaglehole and his American wife Pearl (née Malsin). She trained as a preschool teacher before immigrating to the United States in the 1960s at the age of 25. She settled in Los Angeles and helped organize a food cooperative in Echo Park known as the Food Conspiracy.

== Community-based childcare ==
Beaglehole founded a childcare center in the garage of her Echo Park apartment complex in 1970. The center, called the Silver Lake People’s Playgroup, offered early childhood education for $20 per month and emphasized parental involvement and social justice education. Children in the program sang songs like We Shall Not Be Moved alongside traditional children’s songs. The center later changed its name to the Echo Park-Silver Lake People's Child Care Center, and was featured in the short documentary Power to the Playgroup, which received an Emmy Award.

Due to zoning regulations, the garage-based center faced closure. Beaglehole and other parents appealed to the Los Angeles City Council. The city later changed its regulations to allow preschools in residential areas.

== Work with teen parents ==
In the 1980s, Beaglehole founded the Teen Parenting and Childcare Program at the Business Industry School (later the Los Angeles Technology Center), part of the Los Angeles Unified School District (LAUSD). The program offered parenting classes to pregnant and parenting students alongside their academic curriculum. Her classes used storytelling and role-play in teaching parenting skills.

== Center for Nonviolent Education and Parenting ==
In 1999, Beaglehole founded the Center for Nonviolent Education and Parenting, which focused on educating adults to treat children with dignity and respect. She opposed reward-and-punishment approaches to parenting and advocated nonviolent methods of discipline. Participants included both court-mandated and voluntary attendees. It later changed its name to Echo Parenting and Education.

== Personal life and death ==
Beaglehole was married for several years to Art Goldberg, an attorney, and had three children, including Rabbi Susan Goldberg. Her sister-in-law was the politician Jackie Goldberg. Another sister-in-law was the epidemiologist Ruth Bonita. Beaglehole died on April 21, 2025, at the age of 81.

== Legacy ==
Beaglehole was an early advocate for nonviolent parenting education in Los Angeles. She was frequently interviewed by journalists on early childhood education and parenting. In her later years she traveled to India, Japan, Africa, and New Zealand to lead trainings on nonviolent parenting and domestic violence.

== Publications ==
- Mama Listen! Raising a Child Without Violence: A Handbook for Teen Parents (1998).
- A Compassionate Guide to Parenting with Nonviolence (2024).
