= Grey Advertising (New Zealand) Ltd v Marinkovich =

New Zealand legal case

- Court: Auckland Employment Court
- Full case name: Grey Advertising (New Zealand) Limited v Marco Bono Antonio Marinkovich
- Decided: 17 September 1999
- Citation: AEC 70A/99
- Transcript: copy of judgment

Court membership
- Judge sitting: Travis J

Keywords
- without prejudice

Grey Advertising (New Zealand) Ltd v Marinkovich [AEC 70A/99] is an important case in New Zealand regarding the admissibility to court as evidence correspondence marked "without prejudice". It is now referred to in legal circles as the "Grey Rules".

== Facts ==
Marco Marinkovich was employed by Grey Advertising (New Zealand) Limited, the New Zealand branch of the multibillion-dollar global advertising agency Grey Advertising.

After accumulated losses of $4 million, Grey first tried and failed to dismiss Marinkovich on the grounds that his employment was terminated due to his employment contract having expired.

Grey then proceeded to suspend Marinkovich, which he responded to by saying he would come and clear out his office at Grey, which Grey's solicitors argued was a resignation (which Marinkovich denied). Grey then refused to pay his outstanding holiday pay, his two weeks' notice or to buy out his 25% share in the company.

Marinkovich then made a claim for wrongful dismissal with the Employment Court. Grey responded by filing with the court an injunction for restraint of trade against Marinkovich to stop him approaching any of their advertising clients or staff, as by now he had started a rival advertising agency called CreativeBankAgency. Grey also sought damages of $550,000.

After an informal settlement meeting, Grey's management asked Marinkovich for a settlement offer, for which he sent a proposed settlement offer by fax on 27 July 1999, which was marked "without prejudice".

Under normal circumstances correspondence marked "without prejudice" can not be later used as evidence in court, on the basis that this encourages parties to negotiate freely into settling a legal dispute without having to go to a costly and time-consuming court hearing.

However, some of the contents of this fax were argued to contain veiled threats of action if the proposed offer was not accepted, such as poaching clients and staff from Grey, which were arguably illegal (depending on whether or not he was legally bound by a valid restraint of trade clause). The letter also made veiled threats to disclose (to the media and Grey's clients) alleged illegal behaviour by Grey, such as overcharging of their clients by Grey.

Grey's lawyers argued that this letter amounted to extortion (a criminal act), and at the very least placed undue and unfair pressure on Grey to settle this matter, and asked the court for an interlocutory ruling that this letter be admissible in court.

== Judgment ==
The judge ruled that the letter be admissible to the court proceedings. The judge also ruled that one of Grey's "without prejudice" letters be admissible.
