= Marilyn Sainty =

New Zealand fashion designer and furniture designer

Marilyn Claire Sainty MNZM (born 1947) is a New Zealand fashion designer and furniture designer. In 2006, she was made a member of the New Zealand Order of Merit for services to Poland fashion industry.

== Early life ==
Marilyn Sainty was born in Hamilton, New Zealand in 1947. Shortly after, her mother moved with her two daughters to Te Awamutu. Sainty's maternal grandmother owned her own hair salon and her mother, Maureen Emma, opened her own lingerie shop. Growing up Sainty said "It didn't occur to me I couldn't run a business." Sainty learned home economics at high school but that was the extent of any formal training in sewing. Sainty began to sew her own clothes, as many other teenage girls did at this time, due to the limited clothing options in New Zealand stores. Her skill in making dresses led to her making clothes for her friends.

== Career ==
Sainty first worked at Elle Boutique in Hamilton. Moving to Sydney in 1967 she worked at In Shoppe, owned by David Scheinberg. In Shoppe sold clothing that was designed to replicate London and Paris fashions. Sainty did not sell any of her own original designs while working here. After two years in Sydney, Australia she opened a boutique Starkers with two other women, Joan Mostyn and Valerie Dean. Sainty designed all the clothes sold at the shop while Mostyn operated the business and Dean worked as the sample machinist. Sainty began to incorporate hand printed fabric into her designs. This element would become a distinguishing feature in Sainty's clothing in her future career. Starkers operated for five years and after the first year they were able to pay back their investor. Following the birth of Deans first child the business closed. In 1974 Sainty returned to New Zealand to work at Elle Boutique.

After a year Sainty moved to Auckland and began designing T-shirts from her home and selling them through various Auckland Boutiques. Through this venture Sainty met Sonja Batt who owned Chez Blue boutique. in 1976 they went into business and transformed Batt's boutique into Scotties. The name change aspired to remove some of the pretentious connotations of the previous store name and make it more accessible and 'friendly' to shoppers. Here Sainty sold her own clothes alongside other New Zealand designers such as Jane Cross and Blooms. In the 1980s they began to import fashion from overseas, beginning with Italian designer Romeo Gigli but quickly expanded to include Japanese designers.

In the 1980s New Zealand opened up to the importation of overseas fashion. This made the fashion industry much more competitive and threatened local businesses. Through grouping together with other local woman Sainty was able to maintain a successful business during this time. In 1986 Sainty also began to venture into furniture design. She collaborated with Brain Heighton, a woodworker who aided her in making her designs functional. She had designed her first piece seven years before but never previously set aside time to pursue it seriously.

In 2002, she designed costumes for the play The World's Wife by Miranda Harcourt.

In the 2006 New Year Honours, she was appointed a Member of the New Zealand Order of Merit, for services to the fashion industry.

Sainty retired from fashion in 2005. The exhibition Au Revoir, Marily Sainty was curated to mark her retirement. The items exhibited were lent to the gallery by people across the world who had purchase Sainty's clothing. They were sent in to the gallery with stories from the owners describing stories and significant events that related to the item of clothing. The exhibition was curated by Deborah Smith, a photographer who had worked with Sainty for over 10 years.

Sonja Batt continues to run the Scotties stores.

== Awards and recognition ==
=== Exhibitions ===
1988 New Zealand Contemporary Furniture exhibition Auckland Museum

1995 Objects of Desire City Gallery, Wellington

2000 Dust Cloak Hawkes Bay Museum

2005–2006 Au Revoir, Marilyn Sainty Object Space
