= Tim Beaglehole =

New Zealand historian (1933–2015)

Timothy Holmes Beaglehole (28 April 1933 – 18 July 2015) was a New Zealand academic and Chancellor of Victoria University of Wellington.

Born in Lower Hutt, Wellington, he was the son of the renowned historian John Beaglehole. He gained a MA from Victoria, then receiving a MA and PhD from King's College, Cambridge. He was a Harkness Fellow at Harvard University (1965–1966) and taught at the School of Oriental and African Studies, University of London in 1978.

Beaglehole had a long association with Victoria University as a student, professor of history, warden of Weir House, dean of arts, and deputy vice-chancellor. In 1995 he was made a life member of the Victoria University of Wellington Students' Association. He went on to become chancellor from December 2004 to 2010.

Beaglehole was deputy chairman of the council of the National Art Gallery (1979–1992), and chairperson of the New Zealand Historic Places Trust (1990–1996). In June 2012, Beaglehole was appointed the New Zealand Press Council.

He married Helen Bisley and they had three children, John, Toby and Charlotte. He died of pneumonia in July 2015.
