= Ruth Bonita =

New Zealand epidemiologist

- Other name: Ruth Bonita Beaglehole
- Spouse: Robert Beaglehole
- Awards: Officer of the New Zealand Order of Merit, Honorary doctorate of Umeå University

Academic background
- Education: University of Auckland
- Thesis: The epidemiology and management of cerebrovascular disease (1985)
- Doctoral advisor: Derek North

Ruth Bonita, also known as Ruth Bonita Beaglehole, ONZM is an Australian–New Zealand academic, and is an emeritus professor at the University of Auckland, specialising in stroke. In 2006 she was appointed an Officer of the New Zealand Order of Merit for services to medicine. She is also an Honorary Doctor of Medicine at Umea University.

== Academic career ==
Bonita was born and grew up in New South Wales, where her father was the head of a mining rescue service. In 1966 she met Robert Beaglehole on a boat to China, and they married the following year. The couple went to London together in 1970, where Beaglehole trained at Guys and the London School of Hygiene and Tropical Medicine, and then to the University of North Carolina at Chapel Hill, where Bonita earned a Masters in Public Health. Bonita then joined the faculty of the University of Auckland. As a research fellow, she became interested in the causes and prevention of strokes, on which there was little research at the time. She led the Auckland Regional Coronary or Stroke (ARCOS) study, which began in 1980. The two-year ARCOS study then became part of the MONICA project (Monitoring the Trends and Determinants of Cardiovascular Disease), a longer-term international multicentre project led by the World Health Organisation. Bonita completed a PhD titled The epidemiology and management of cerebrovascular disease at the University of Auckland in 1985.

In 1999 Bonita was invited to become the director of surveillance of non-communicable diseases at WHO in Geneva. This led to an interest in global public health policies, and ways to adapt public health guidelines for lower-income countries.

Bonita retired in 2004, and was appointed professor emeritus at the University of Auckland.

== Honours and awards ==
In 2006 Bonita was appointed an Officer of the New Zealand Order of Merit for services to medicine. In 1996 she was made an Honorary Doctor of Medicine at Umea University, where she is on the Advisory Board of the Aging and Life Course Programme.

== Selected works ==
- Beaglehole, Robert; Bonita, Ruth, eds. (9 July 2009). Global Public Health: A New Era (2nd ed.). Oxford University Press. ISBN 9780191724053.
- Beaglehole, Robert H.; Bonita, Ruth; Horton, Richard; et al. (2011). "Priority actions for the non-communicable disease crisis". The Lancet. 377 (9775): 1438–1447. doi:10.1016/s0140-6736(11)60393-0. PMID 21474174. Wikidata Q34176583.
- Strong, Kathleen; Colin Mathers; Bonita, Ruth (2007). "Preventing stroke: saving lives around the world". The Lancet Neurology. 6 (2): 182–187. doi:10.1016/s1474-4422(07)70031-5. PMID 17239805. Wikidata Q50796686.
- Beaglehole, Robert H.; Bonita, Ruth; George Alleyne; et al. (2011). "UN High-Level Meeting on Non-Communicable Diseases: addressing four questions". The Lancet. 378 (9789): 449–455. doi:10.1016/s0140-6736(11)60879-9. PMID 21665266. Wikidata Q57403213.
- Bonita, Ruth; Shanthi Mendis; Thomas Truelsen; Bogousslavsky, Julien; James Toole; Frank Yatsu (2004). "The global stroke initiative". The Lancet Neurology. 3 (7): 391–393. doi:10.1016/s1474-4422(04)00800-2. PMID 15207791. Wikidata Q35811036.
- Vasilis Kontis; Mathers, Colin; Jürgen Rehm; Gretchen A. Stevens; Shield, Kevin; Bonita, Ruth; Leanne M. Riley; Vladimir Poznyak; Beaglehole, Robert H.; Majid Ezzati (2014). "Contribution of six risk factors to achieving the 25×25 non-communicable disease mortality reduction target: a modelling study". The Lancet. 384 (9941): 427–437. doi:10.1016/s0140-6736(14)60616-4. PMID 24797573. Wikidata Q43820015.
