= Ernest Beaglehole =

New Zealand psychologist and ethnologist (1906–1965)

- Born: Ernest Beaglehole; 25 August 1906; Wellington, New Zealand
- Died: 23 October 1965 (aged 59); Wellington, New Zealand
- Citizenship: New Zealand
- Education: Wellington College; Victoria University College; London School of Economics; Yale University
- Known for: Anthropology
- Awards: Commonwealth Fund Fellowship, Hector Memorial Medal
- Scientific career
- Fields: Psychology; Ethnology
- Workplaces: United States Bureau of Indian Affairs

Ernest Beaglehole (25 August 1906 – 23 October 1965) was a New Zealand psychologist and ethnologist best known for his work in establishing an anthropological baseline for numerous Pacific Island cultures.

== Early life and education ==
Beaglehole was born to David Ernest Beaglehole and his wife Jane Butler in Wellington as the youngest of four children. He attended Mount Cook School until he left for Wellington College. He continued to Victoria University College, where his abilities first began to receive some notice. There he completed his master's degree in 1928. He studied in London for his PhD work on acquisitiveness and the psychological basis of property. While in London, Beaglehole met Pearl Malsin, an American student from Wisconsin. After completing his PhD, he received the Commonwealth Fund Fellowship.

This supported his traveling to Yale University in Connecticut to conduct post-doctoral research. Pearl later joined him in New Haven, and they were married on 24 May 1933. At Yale, Beaglehole met Peter Buck, a professor who "arranged for the Beagleholes to go to Pukapuka, a remote Northern Cook Islands atoll, as part of his comprehensive Pacific island ethnographic survey".

== Research and achievements ==
From his studies of Pacific Island cultures, Beaglehole wrote many books. Following his research in Pukapuka, he published Ethnology of Pukapuka (1938). He and his wife continued this research, and a year later he published Some Modern Hawaiians (1939). Beaglehole returned to Victoria University College as a senior lecturer, where his brother John Cawte Beaglehole was a noted researcher in his own right. Ernest Beaglehole was awarded a Doctorate in Letters in 1940, and in 1948 he was appointed chair of psychology and philosophy.

His next book was Some Modern Maoris. He completed his scholarship in the field with his work Social Change in the South Pacific (1957). Throughout his works he placed a great deal of emphasis on the facts of native cultures and the fading of these cultures over time.

During the 1950s, Beaglehole was frequently consulted for his expertise. Most notably, he was one of the primary authors of UNESCO's The Race Question, an international statement by sociologists about the unscientific and immoral nature of racism and race theories. He was later called upon by the ILO in various capacities, initially as a field adviser and leader, and later as chairman of the ILO Committee of Experts on Indigenous Labor.

== Personal life ==
Beaglehole died at the age of 59 in Wellington, New Zealand, on 23 October 1965. He was survived by his wife Pearl and their four children. Three followed their parents into academia: their daughter Jane Ritchie became a full professor at the University of Waikato as an expert in child-raising. Their son David Beaglehole was a professor of physical electronics and Fellow of the Royal Society of New Zealand. Another son, Robert Beaglehole, was a professor of public health at the University of Auckland.

== Awards and honours ==
- Fellow of the Royal Society of New Zealand
- Hector Memorial Medal and Prize
- Polynesian Society
- British Psychological Society
- American Anthropological Association
