= David Beaglehole =

New Zealand physicist (1938–2014)

- Born: 8 January 1938; Wellington, New Zealand
- Died: 21 March 2014 (aged 76)
- Education: Trinity College, Cambridge
- Known for: Condensed matter physics Optical properties of materials Ellipsometry
- Spouse: Ann Beaglehole (divorced)
- Partner: Bhagee Ramanathan
- Children: 4
- Scientific career
- Fields: Physics
- Workplaces: University of Chicago; University of Maryland; Victoria University of Wellington
- Thesis: (1963)
- Doctoral advisor: Tom Faber

David Beaglehole (8 January 1938 – 21 March 2014) was a New Zealand physicist.

== Early life, family and education ==
Beaglehole was born in Wellington in 1938 into an academic family. His parents were American-born linguist Pearl Beaglehole (née Malsin) and her husband Ernest Beaglehole, a psychologist and ethnologist, who had met while they were both studying at the London School of Economics. His uncle was historian John Beaglehole.

Educated at Wellington College from 1951 to 1954, he then studied physics, chemistry and psychology at Victoria University College, graduating with a Bachelor of Science in 1958 and a Master of Science with first-class honours in 1960. He then carried out doctoral research into the optical properties of copper and gold in the far ultraviolet at Trinity College, Cambridge under Tom Faber, and was awarded his PhD in 1963.

He had three children with his wife Ann Beaglehole; after their marriage ended, he had another child with his long-term partner Bhagee Ramanathan.

== Academic career ==
After post-doctoral research at the University of Chicago from 1964 to 1966, Beaglehole was an assistant professor and then associate professor at the University of Maryland. He returned to Victoria University of Wellington in 1969 as professor of physical electronics, and began research into condensed matter physics and astronomy at the university. He also developed an improved ellipsometric method for measuring the thickness of liquid interfaces, which led to the establishment of Beaglehole Instruments in 1993.

Beaglehole was elected a Fellow of the Royal Society of New Zealand in 1992.
