= John Beaglehole =

New Zealand historian

John Beaglehole OM CMG
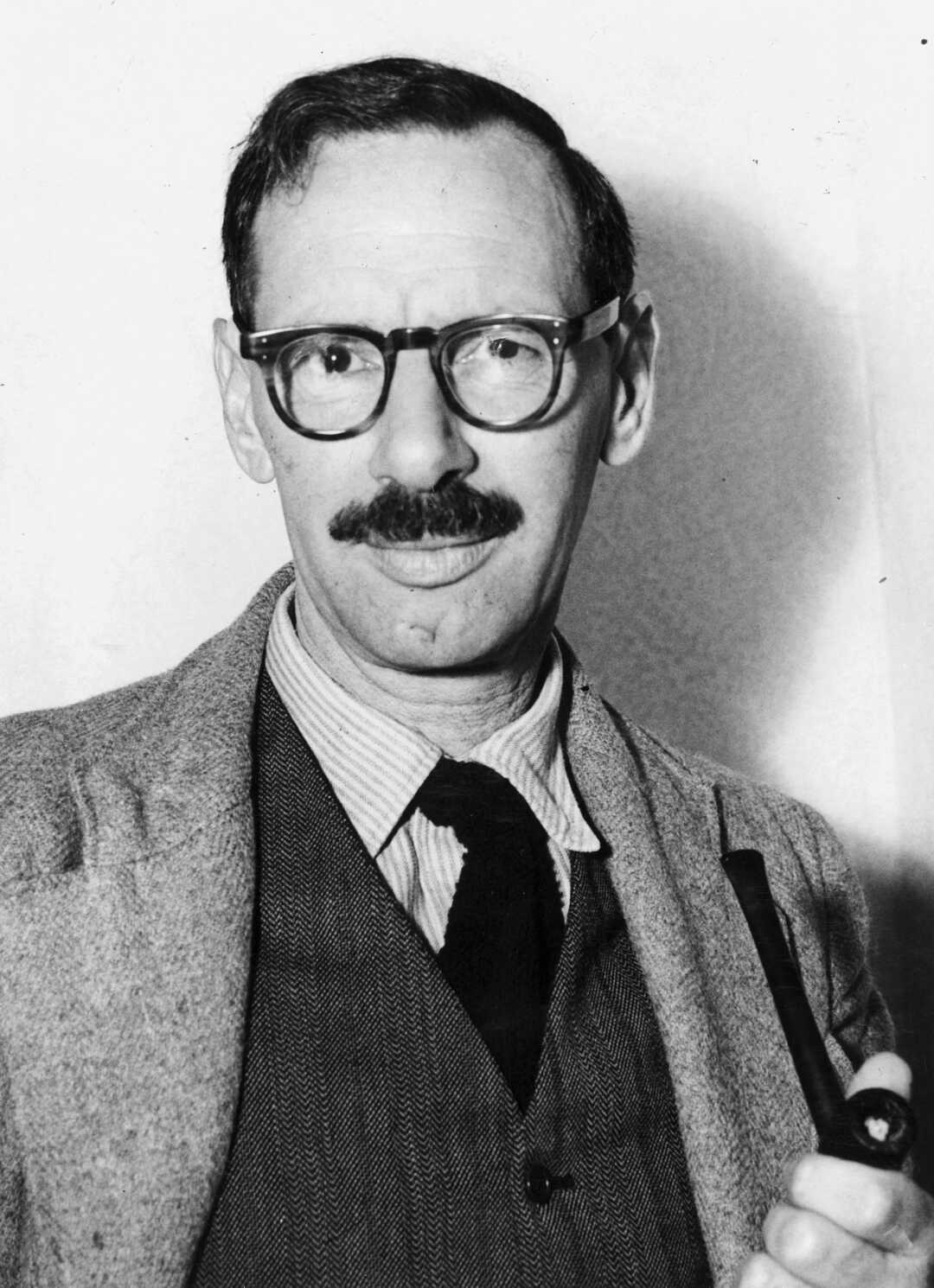
- Beaglehole in 1950
- Born: John Cawte Beaglehole; 13 June 1901; Wellington, New Zealand
- Died: 10 October 1971 (aged 70); Wellington, New Zealand
- Spouse: Elsie Mary Holmes (m. 1930)
- Children: 3, including Tim

Academic background
- Education: Victoria University of Wellington; London School of Economics

Academic work
- Discipline: History

John Cawte Beaglehole (13 June 1901 – 10 October 1971) was a New Zealand historian who is most known for the editing of James Cook's three journals of exploration, together with the writing of a widely praised biography of Cook, published posthumously.

He had a lifelong association with Victoria University College, which became Victoria University of Wellington, and after his death it named the archival collections after him.

== Early life and career ==
John Cawte Beaglehole was born on 13 June 1901, in Wellington, New Zealand, the second son of David Ernest Beaglehole, a clerk, and his wife Jane (née Butler). John had one elder brother (Geoffrey) and two younger brothers (Keith and Ernest). Ernest Beaglehole became a psychologist and ethnologist. John was educated at Mount Cook School and Wellington College before being enrolled at Victoria University College, Wellington of the University of New Zealand, which later became an independent university, and where he subsequently spent most of his academic career. After his graduation, he was awarded a scholarship to study at the London School of Economics, and left for England in 1926.

After three years of post-graduate study Beaglehole obtained his PhD with a thesis on British colonial history. At this time he was much influenced by left-wing teachers, especially R. H. Tawney and Harold Laski, and on returning to New Zealand he found it difficult to obtain an academic post owing to his radical views. For a time he had various jobs including a spell as a Workers' Educational Association lecturer, and had time to develop other enthusiasms including civil rights issues, writing poetry, and music, an interest inherited from his mother. In 1932 he took a temporary position as a lecturer in history at Auckland University College, but within months the position was abolished in a retrenchment by the college council. Many believed the decision was due more to the college's reaction to Beaglehole's reputation (albeit exaggerated) for radicalism. His academic career finally took off in 1934 after the publication of his first major book, The Exploration of the Pacific, after which he developed his specialist interest in James Cook. He became lecturer, later professor, at the Victoria University College.

He married Elsie Mary Holmes on 17 February 1930, and they had three sons.

== Editing Cook's journals ==
Beaglehole became known internationally for his work on Cook's journals, which brought out his great gifts as historian and editor. It was not all desk work among the archives – he also travelled widely in Cook's wake, from Whitby to Tahiti, to Tonga and to the New Hebrides. The four volumes of the journals that emerged between 1955 and 1967 were subsidised by the New Zealand government, which also set up a special research post for their author. The sheer size of these tomes, each of them approaching 1,000 pages, may seem disconcerting at first sight, but they are enlivened by Beaglehole's stylish and often witty introductions, intended to set the journals in their contexts.

As well as Cook's own journals Beaglehole also printed, either entire or in lengthy extracts, the journals of several of Cook's colleagues on the voyages. The introductions themselves, together with copious footnotes, reveal the breadth of his erudition. They cover many topics, ranging from the structure of Polynesian society to oceanography, navigation, cartography, and much else.

Many of the zoological and botanical notes for Beaglehole's work on James Cook's three voyages were provided by Dr Averil Margaret Lysaght.

Cook's journals themselves had never before been comprehensively and accurately presented to the public, and to do so required enormous research since copies and fragments of the journals and related material were scattered in various archives in London, Australia and New Zealand. For his edition, Beaglehole sought out the various surviving holographs in Cook's own hand in preference to copies by his clerks on board ship, and others. For the first voyage, the voyage of the Endeavour, he used mainly the manuscript journal held in the National Library of Australia at Canberra. This came to light only in 1923, when the heirs of a Teesside ironmaster, Henry Bolckow, put it up for sale. Bolckow had purchased this manuscript at an earlier auction, in 1868, but had not made his ownership widely known, and consequently it was assumed for many years that no such holograph existed. For the second voyage Beaglehole used two other partial journals in Cook's hand, both of which had the same early history as the Endeavour journal.

All three had probably once been owned by Cook's widow, and sold by a relation of hers at the 1868 auction. The difference was that the two partial journals from the second voyage were then purchased by the British Museum and not by Bolckow, and hence had long been available for public consultation. And for the third voyage Beaglehole's main source was a journal written, and much revised, by Cook up to early January 1779, a month before he died. What happened to the final month's entries, which must certainly have been made, is uncertain. This, too, is today in the British Library, the successor to the British Museum as a manuscript repository.

All students of Cook owe an enormous debt to Beaglehole for his all-encompassing editorship. So much so, in fact, that today it is difficult to view the subject of Cook except through Beaglehole's perspective. Some recent biographies of Cook have tended to be little else than abbreviated versions of Beaglehole. Nevertheless, it is also clear that Beaglehole’s work is, by and large, a continuation of the long tradition of Cook idealisation, a tradition from which post-Beaglehole scholarship has started to diverge. For Beaglehole, Cook was an heroic figure who practically could do no wrong, and he is scathing about those contemporaries of Cook who ever ventured to criticise his hero, such as Alexander Dalrymple, the geographer, and Johann Reinhold Forster, who accompanied Cook on the second voyage. Recent research has to some extent rehabilitated both Dalrymple and Forster.

== Honours and awards ==
In the 1958 Queen's Birthday Honours, Beaglehole was appointed a Companion of the Order of St Michael and St George, for services in the fields of historical research and literature. During his last decade, Beaglehole was showered with honorary degrees from universities at home and abroad and other distinctions. Perhaps the most prestigious was the award in 1970 of the British Order of Merit. He was only the second New Zealander ever to receive this award, the first being the nuclear physicist Ernest Rutherford.

In 1969 he was awarded the Mueller Medal by the Australian and New Zealand Association for the Advancement of Science.

== Later life and death ==
Just before he died in 1971 Beaglehole was in the process of revising his detailed and authoritative biography of Cook, which was subsequently prepared for publication by his son Tim, who was Chancellor and Emeritus Professor at Victoria.

== Archival collections at Victoria University ==
Beaglehole's alma mater, the Victoria University of Wellington, named its archival collections after him, in the reading room of which is displayed his portrait, by W.A. Sutton. The J.C. Beaglehole Room, as it is known, was moved into a completely new space in 2011.

== Works ==
- The Exploration of the Pacific, London, A. & C. Black, 1934.
- ed., The Endeavour Journal of Joseph Banks 1768–1771, vol 1 & vol 2., Sydney, 1962.
- ed., The Journals of Captain James Cook: The Voyage of the Endeavour, 1768–1771, Cambridge, 1955, reprinted 1968.
- ed., The Journals of Captain James Cook: The Voyage of the Resolution and Adventure, 1772–1775, Cambridge, 1961, reprinted 1969.
- ed., The Journals of Captain James Cook: The Voyage of the Resolution and Discovery, 1776–1780, 2 vols., Cambridge, 1967.
- The Life of Captain James Cook, Stanford, California, 1974.
- The Death of Captain Cook. Wellington, NZ, Alexander Turnbull Library, 1979.

== See also ==
- Beaglehole Glacier in Graham Land, Antarctica is named after him.
