= Employment Court of New Zealand =

The Employment Court of New Zealand (Māori: Te Kooti Take-a-mihi o Aotearoa) is a specialist court for employment disputes. It mainly deals with issues arising under the Employment Relations Act 2000. The Employment Court is a court of record and has equal standing to the High Court of New Zealand.

== History ==
The Court of Arbitration was a specialist employment court in New Zealand that dealt with industrial relations disputes from 1894 to 1973.

The Industrial Conciliation and Arbitration Act 1894 created a compulsory arbitration system for resolving industrial disputes. Part of this involved the creation of the Court of Arbitration. The court heard industrial disputes, made and interpreted awards, and set minimum standards of employment. The court also had the power to set and adjust wages. The court comprised a Supreme Court judge, a union representative, and an employers' representative.

These elements continued through a number of successive acts until repeal in 1973.

The Employment Contracts Act 1991 established the Employment Court to deal with employment disputes.

== Chief judge ==
The following is a list of the chief judges of the Employment Court since it was established in 1991.

	Name	Portrait	Term of office	Sources
1	Thomas Goddard		15 May 1991 – 19 May 2005	
2	Graeme Colgan		20 May 2005 – 9 July 2017	
3	Christina Inglis		10 July 2017 – present	

== Case law ==
- Manu v Steelink Contracting Services Ltd (1998) WEC2/98
- Grey Advertising (New Zealand) Ltd v Marinkovich (1999) AEC 70A/99
